= Krakowska Street, Bydgoszcz =

Street in Bydgoszcz, Poland

Coordinates: 53.1219°N 18.0215°E

Krakowska Street
Bydgoszcz
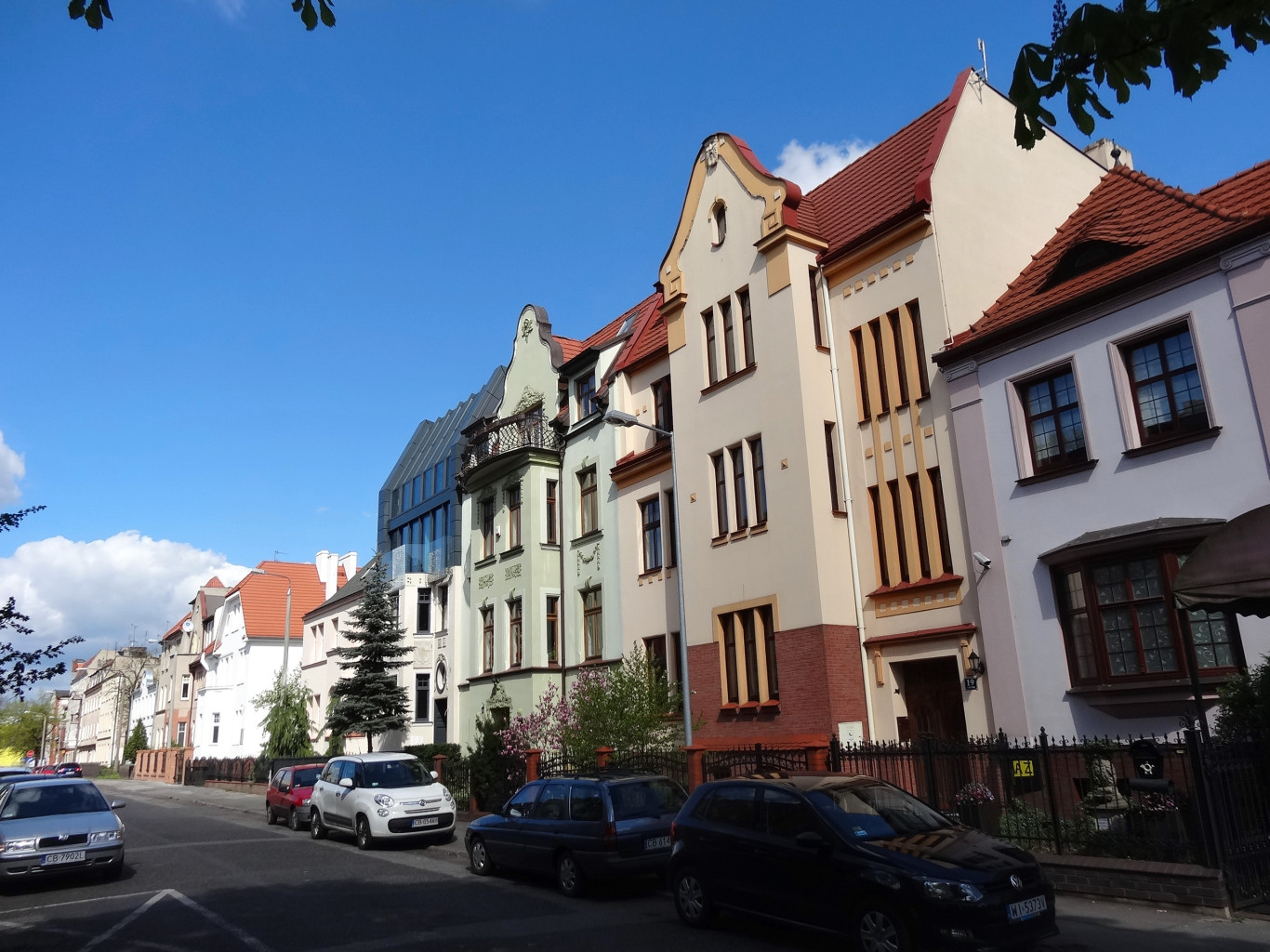
- View of the eastern frontage

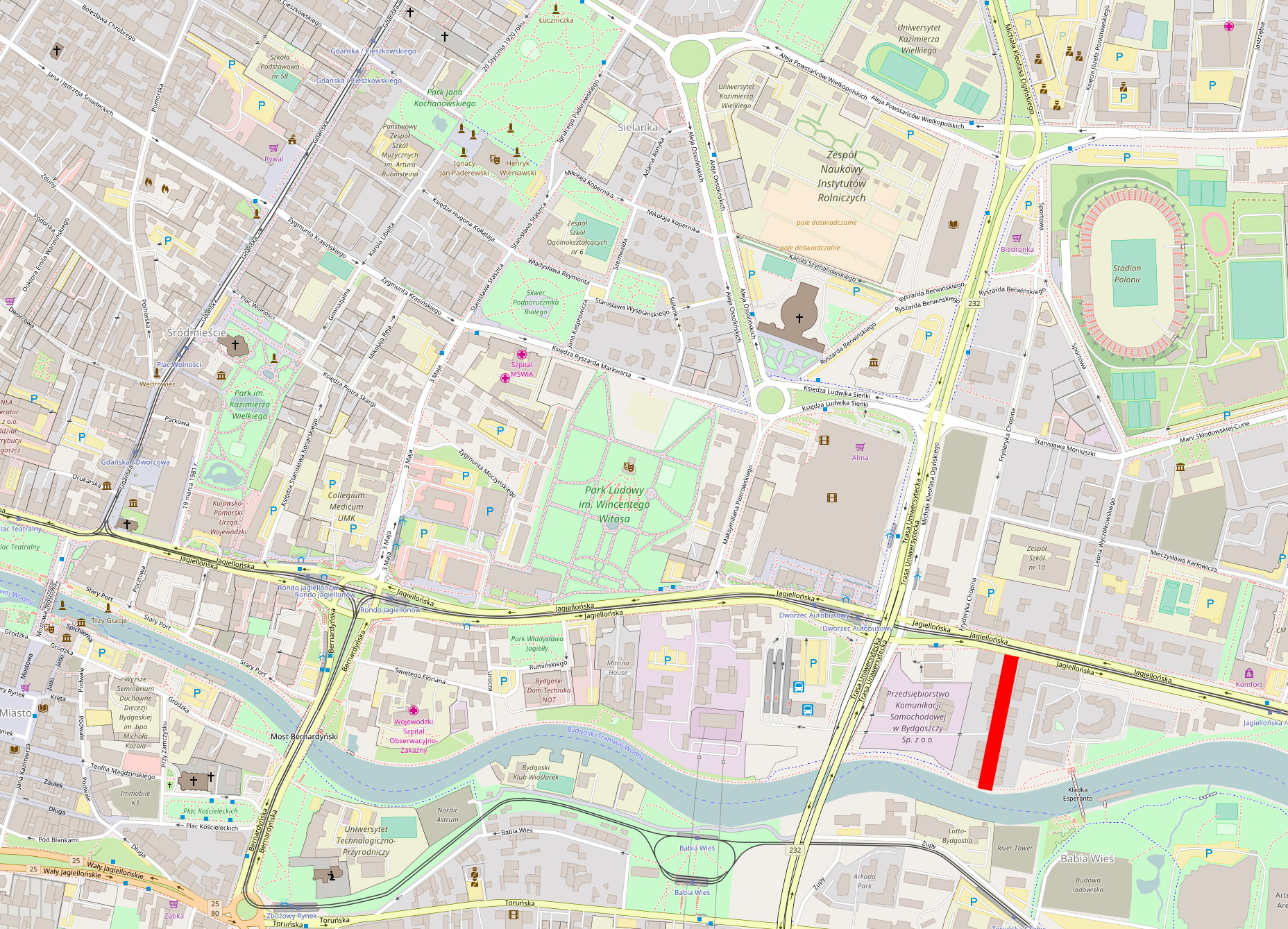
- Location of Krakowska Street in Bydgoszcz
- Native name: Ulica Krakowska (Polish)
- Former name: Hermann Bollmann Straße
- Part of: Bydgoszcz
- Namesake: Kraków
- Owner: City of Bydgoszcz
- Length: 190 m (620 ft)
- Location: Bydgoszcz, Poland

Krakowska street is a small street located in Bydgoszcz, Poland.

== Location ==
The street is located on the edge of downtown Bydgoszcz. It starts on the northern side of the Brda river, and stretches northbound to reach Jagiellońska Street.

== History ==
The street appears on the maps of the area only during the second half of the 19th century, at the same time as happened Bromberg's main expansion, thanks to the development of the Prussian Eastern Railway. The city population grew from 12,900 inhabitants in 1852 to 57,700 inhabitants in 1910.

Krakowska Street, then Bollmann Straße during Prussian period, was located on the territory of a neighbouring suburb, Schröttersdorf. It almost marked during those years (1870s to 1920) the border with Bromberg area, stretching from the Brahe river to Promenaden straße (now Jagiellońska Street).

The western side of the street witnessed in the 1860s the inception and expansion of the Bydgoszcz District Gas Plant: the complex initially covered an area of 0.8 ha, but soon grew up to 7.4 ha after World War I. In 1920, after Bydgoszcz reintegrated Polish territory, this suburban district, including Krakowska Street, has been subsumed to be part of Bydgoszcz city area.

The street was finally entirely organized and inhabited only in the late 1900s (1911).

=== Naming ===
Through history, the street bore the following names:

- 1870s–1920, Bollmann Straße, from Hermann Bollmann, an industrial pioneer;
- 1920–1939, Ulica Krakowska;
- 1939–1945, Bollmann Straße;
- Since 1945, Ulica Krakowska (Krakowska Street).

Current namesake refers to the city of Kraków.

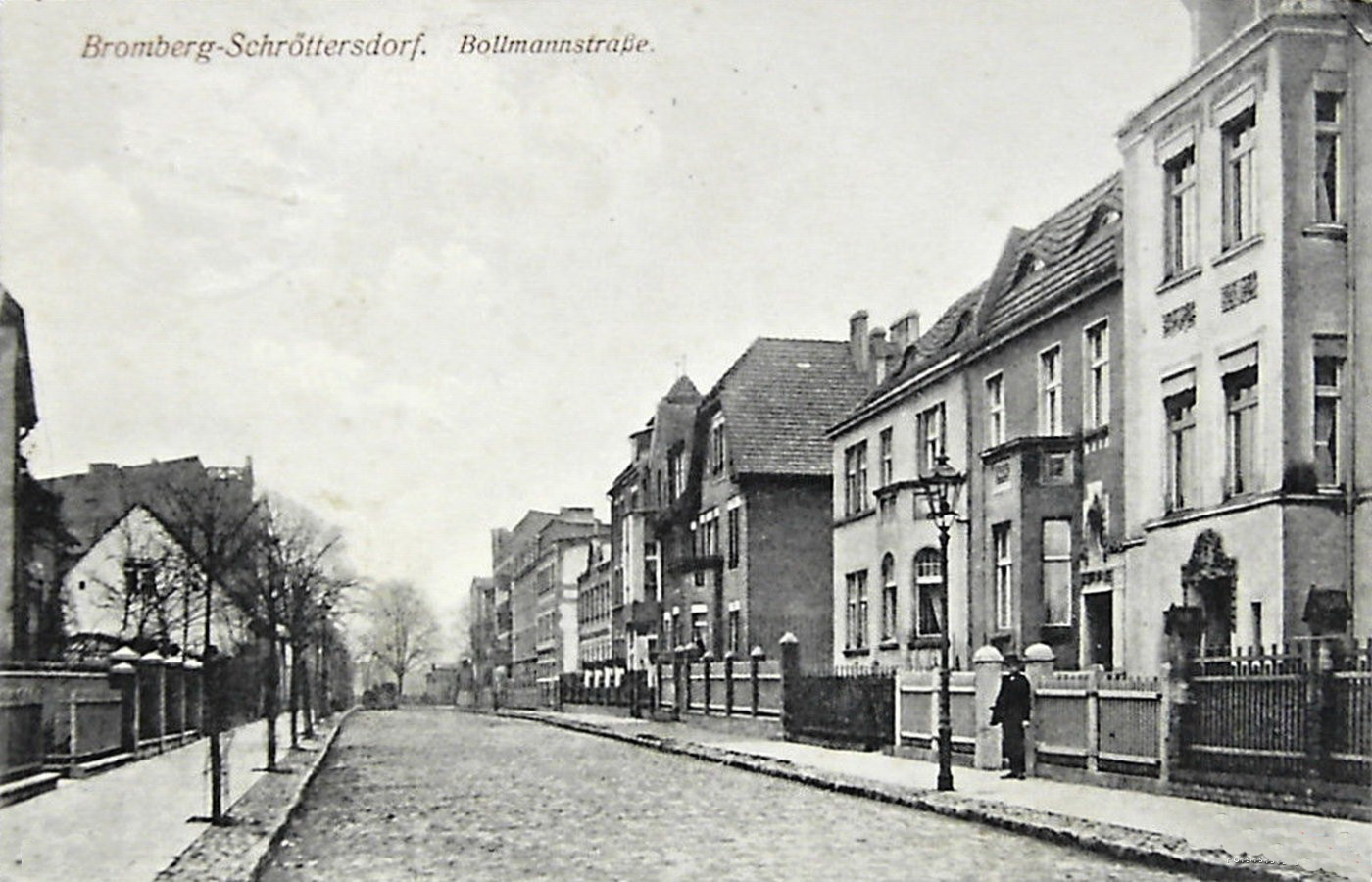
The street in c. 1914

== Main places and buildings ==
=== Villa at 62 Jagiellońska Street, corner with Krakowska Street ===
Registered on Kuyavian-Pomeranian Voivodeship heritage list, Nr.760205 Reg.A/1588 (May 10, 2011)

1907–1908

Art Nouveau

At the time of its erection, the villa was located out of the city limits, in the suburb of Schröterrsdorf, on Promenaden Straße. After 1920 and the re-creation of the Polish state, the expansion of Bydgoszcz subsumed these neighbouring cities; villa's address was then Ulica Promenada 67, then 41 (in 1926), with a landlord named Seweryn Rzymkowski, a merchant.

The villa, recently refurbished in 2014, features superb architectural details: vegetal volutes as cartouches, crying figures on top of pilasters and a corner balcony.

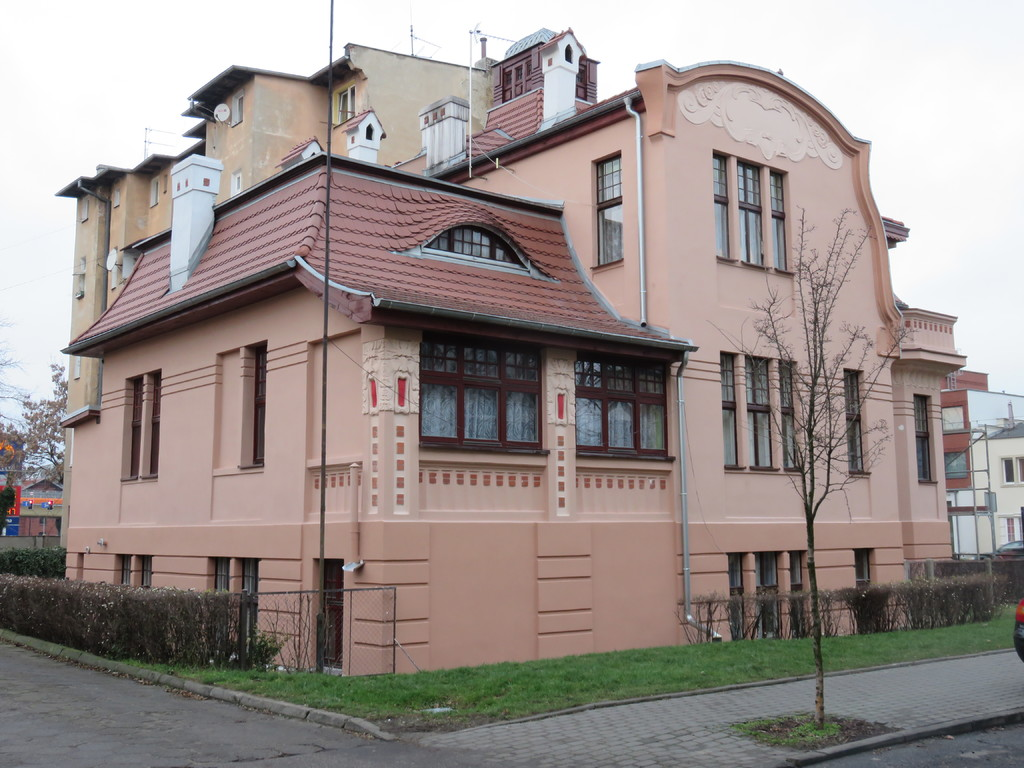
General view from the street

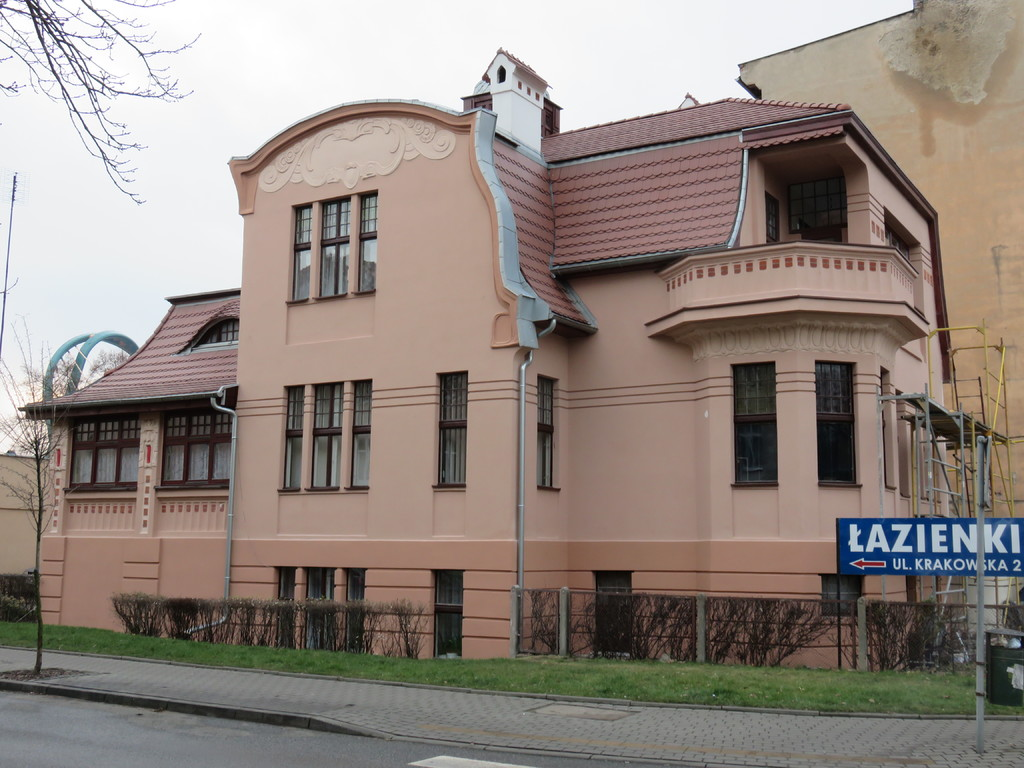
Facade on Krakowska street

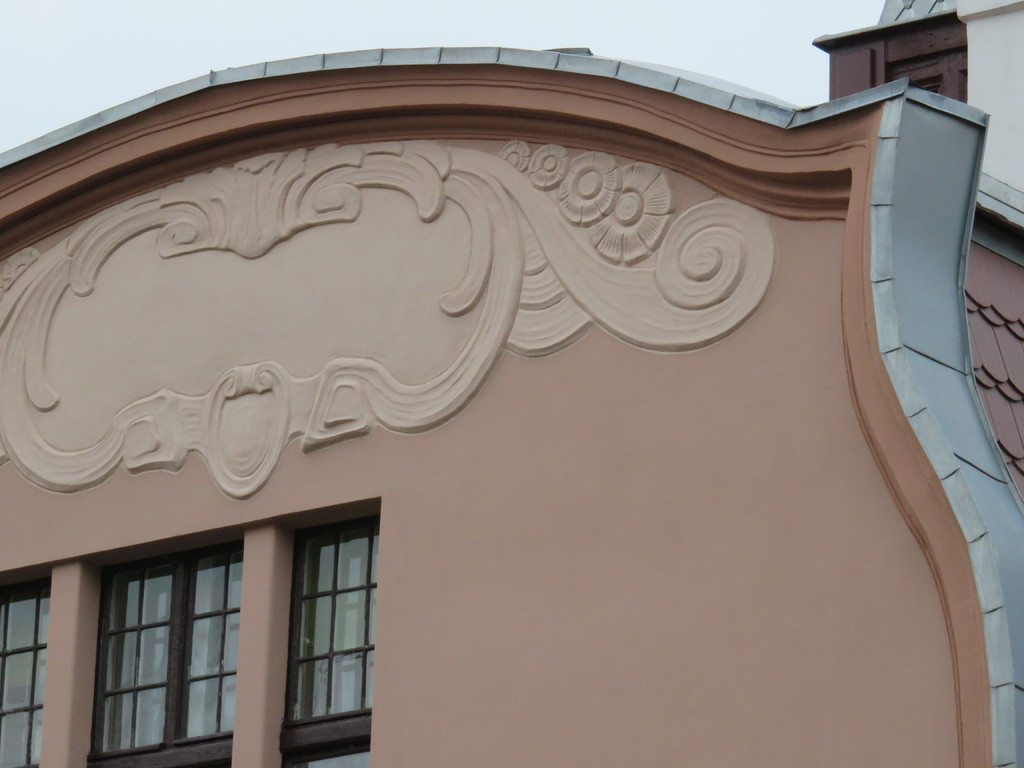
Detail of the vegetal volutes

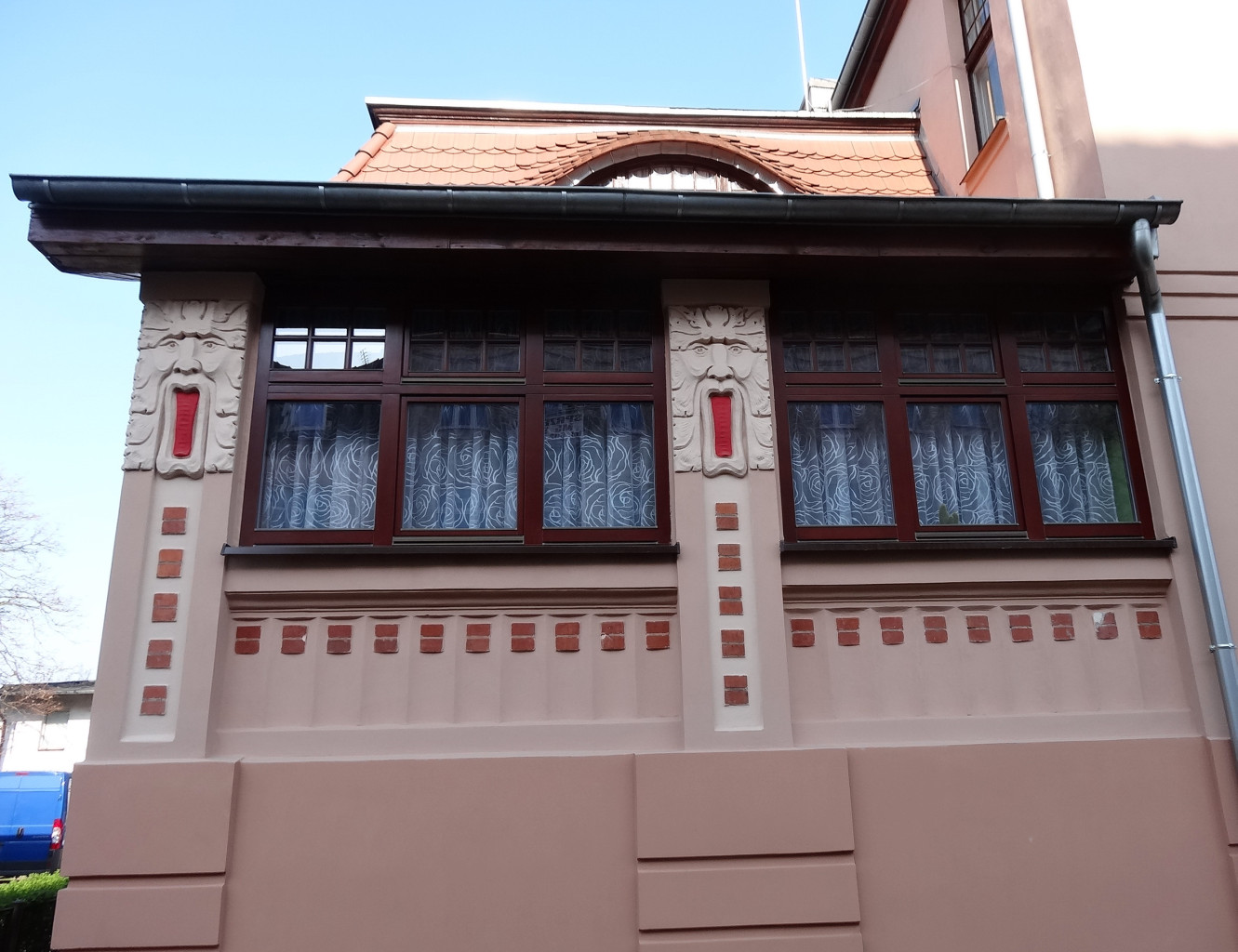
Detail of the masks flanking the windows

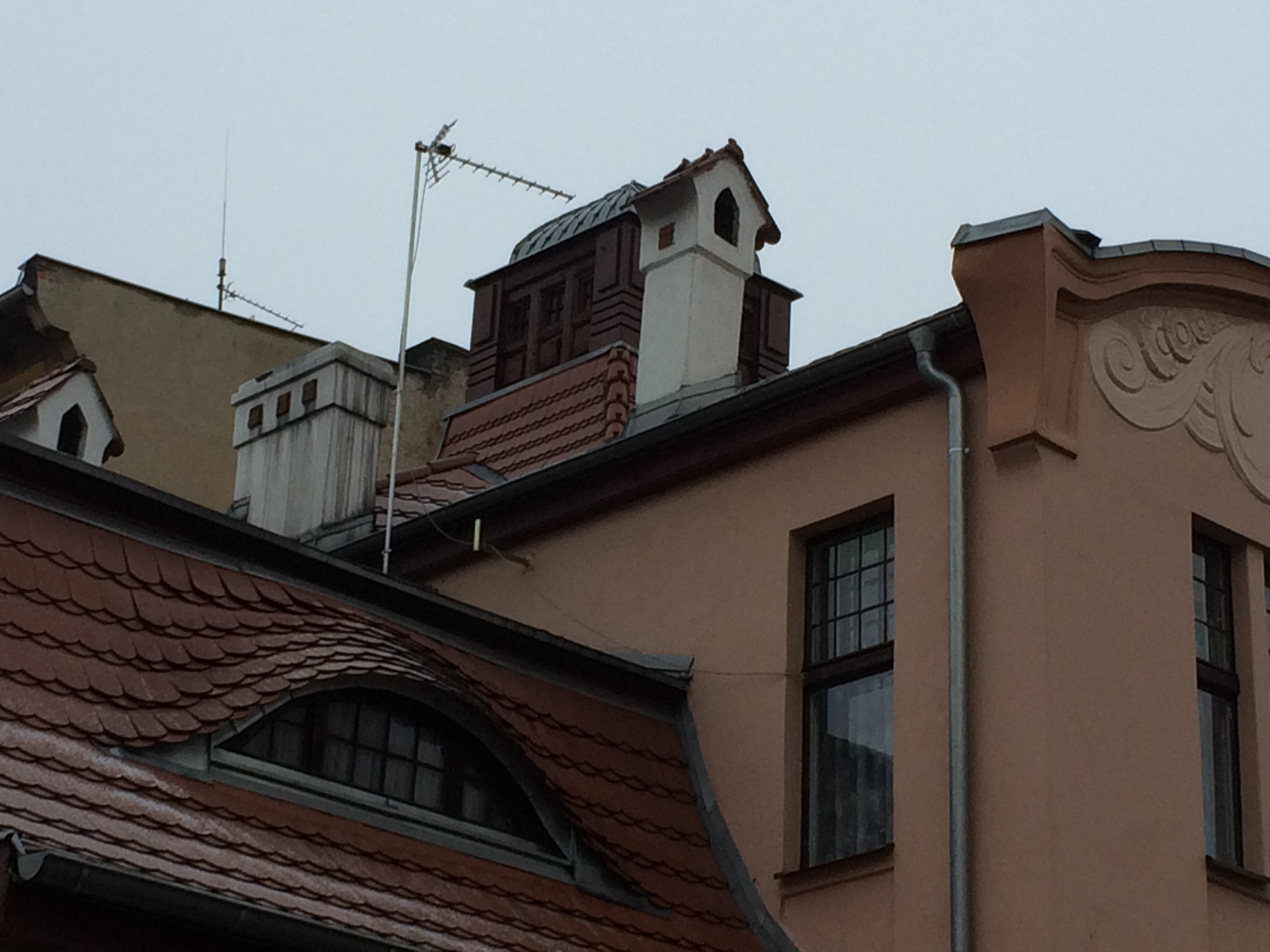
Gable detail

=== Tenement at 64 Jagiellońska Street, corner with Krakowska Street ===
1900s

Art Nouveau

Since the end of the 1890s, the tenement at then Promenadenstraße 51, was the property of Marie Fuhr, the widow of a painter. After 1920, It moved to the hands of Edward Lelito, a merchant, also owner of the tenement at today's Nr.1.

This large corner building impresses by its mass. Recently refurbished, one can notice the curved corner pediment, adorned with an ornamented frieze.

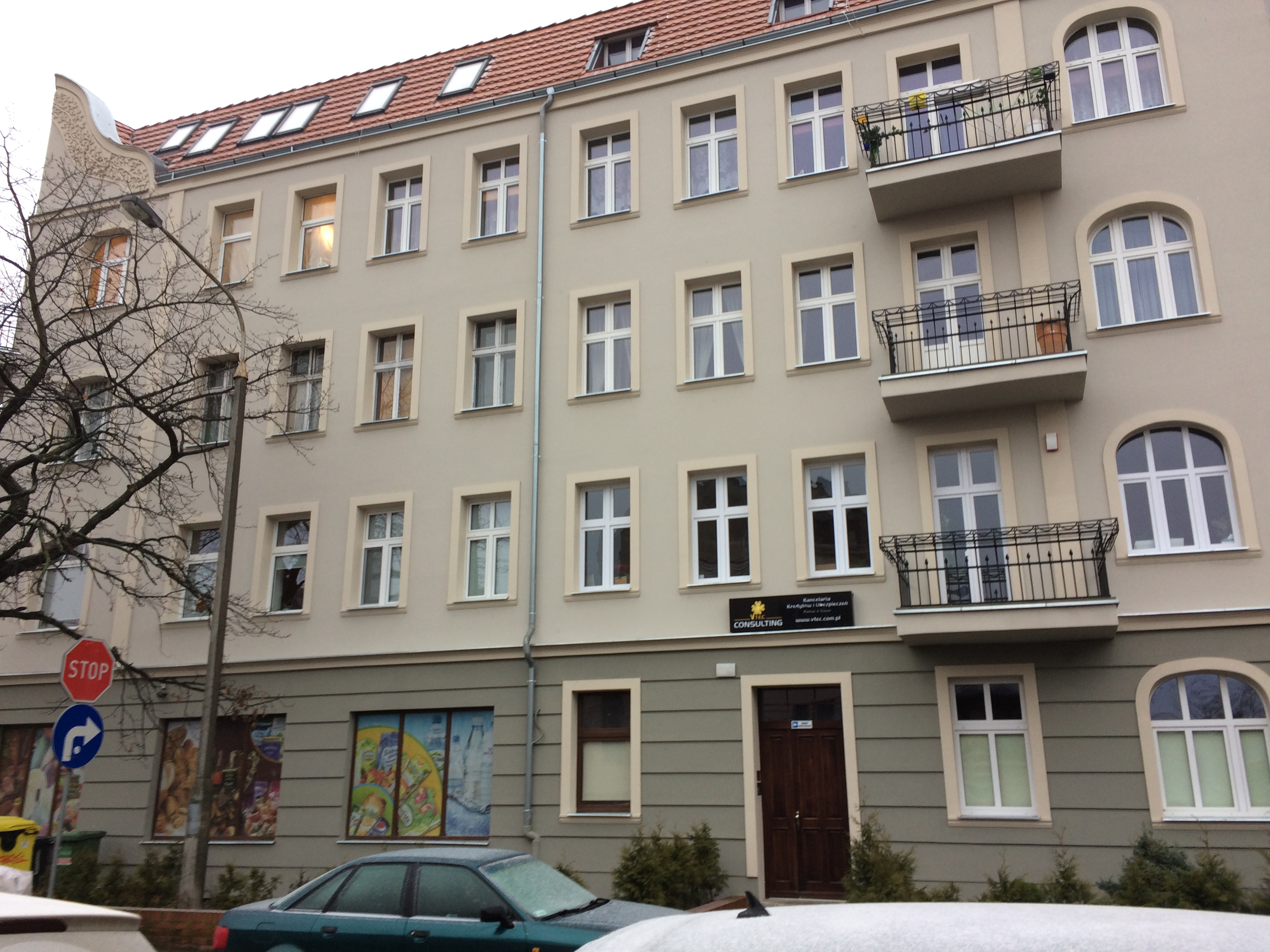
Elevation on Krakowska street

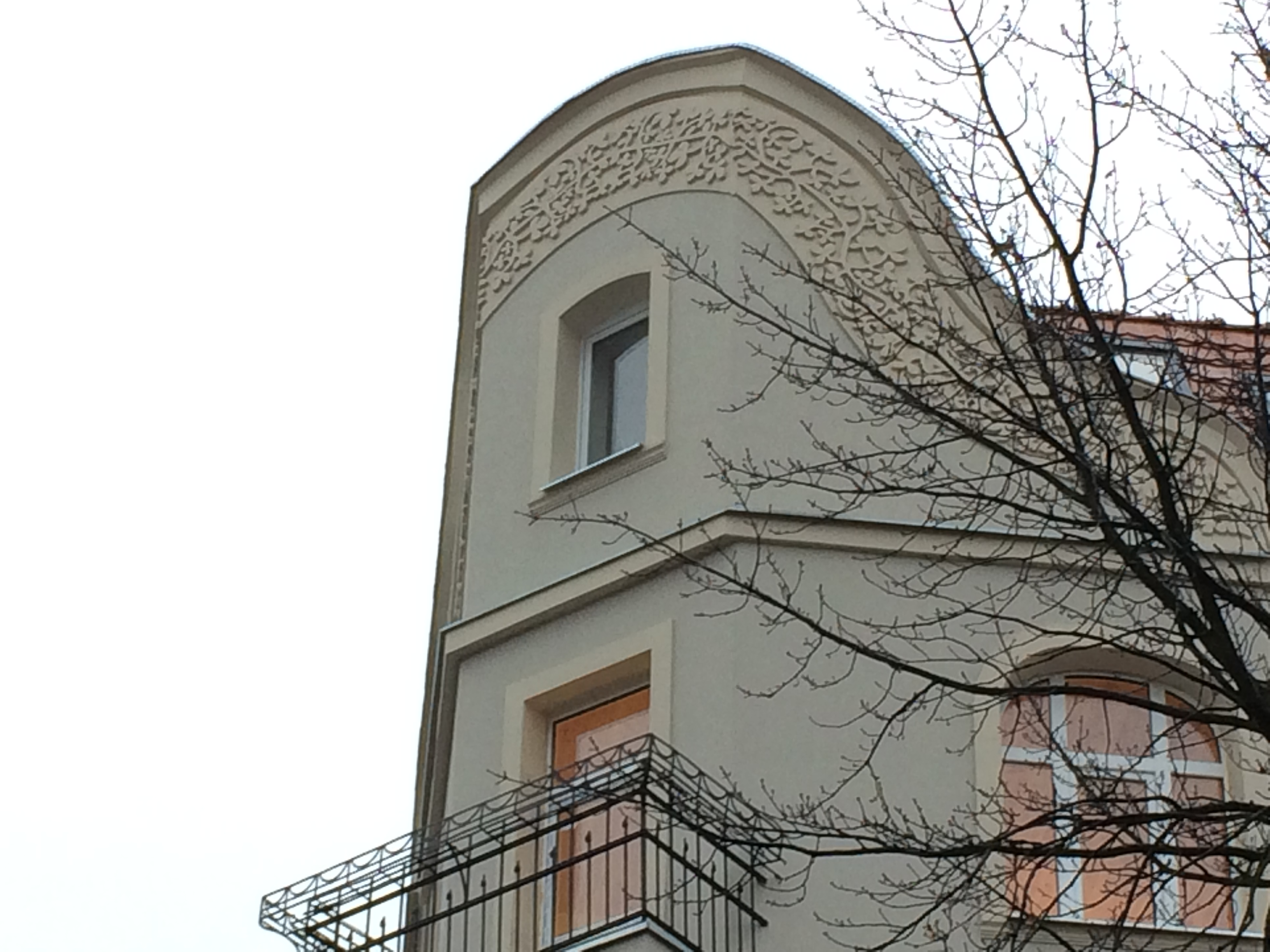
Corner top pediment

=== Tenement at 1 ===
1908

Eclecticism

The tenement at the time at Bollmann Straße 5, then 18, was the property of Paul Roedke, a contractor in a building company.

Deprived of its original decoration, the main elevation, topped by a mansard roof is noticeable by its large wooden door with a transom light, recalling the rays of the sun.

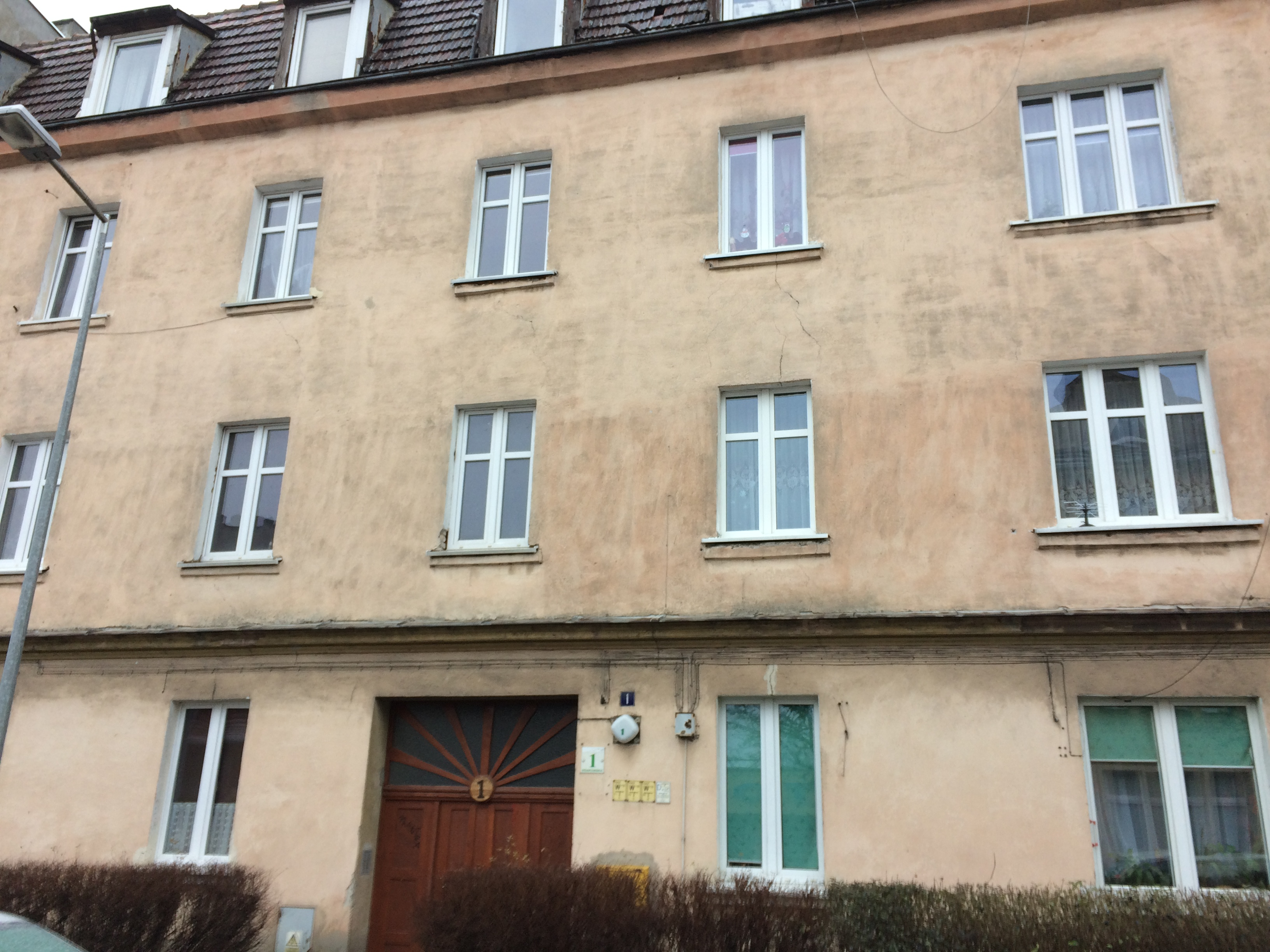
Main elevation

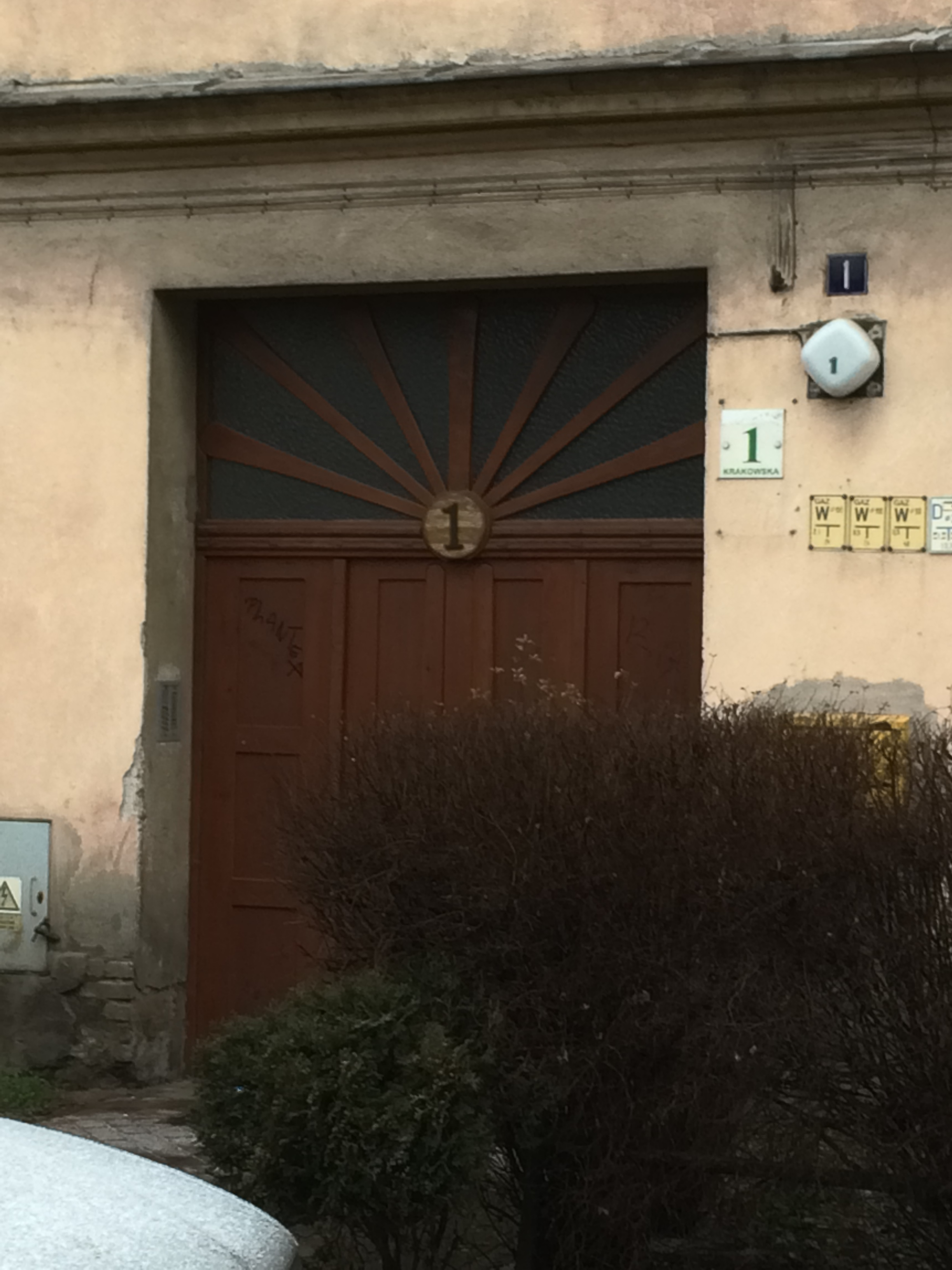
Portal detail

=== Tenement at 3 ===
1909

Eclecticism

First address was Bollmann Straße 16, then 17. The first landlord was a rentier, Julius Lüdtke.

Though renovated with a more functionalist style, the building kept its roofed wooden side entry.

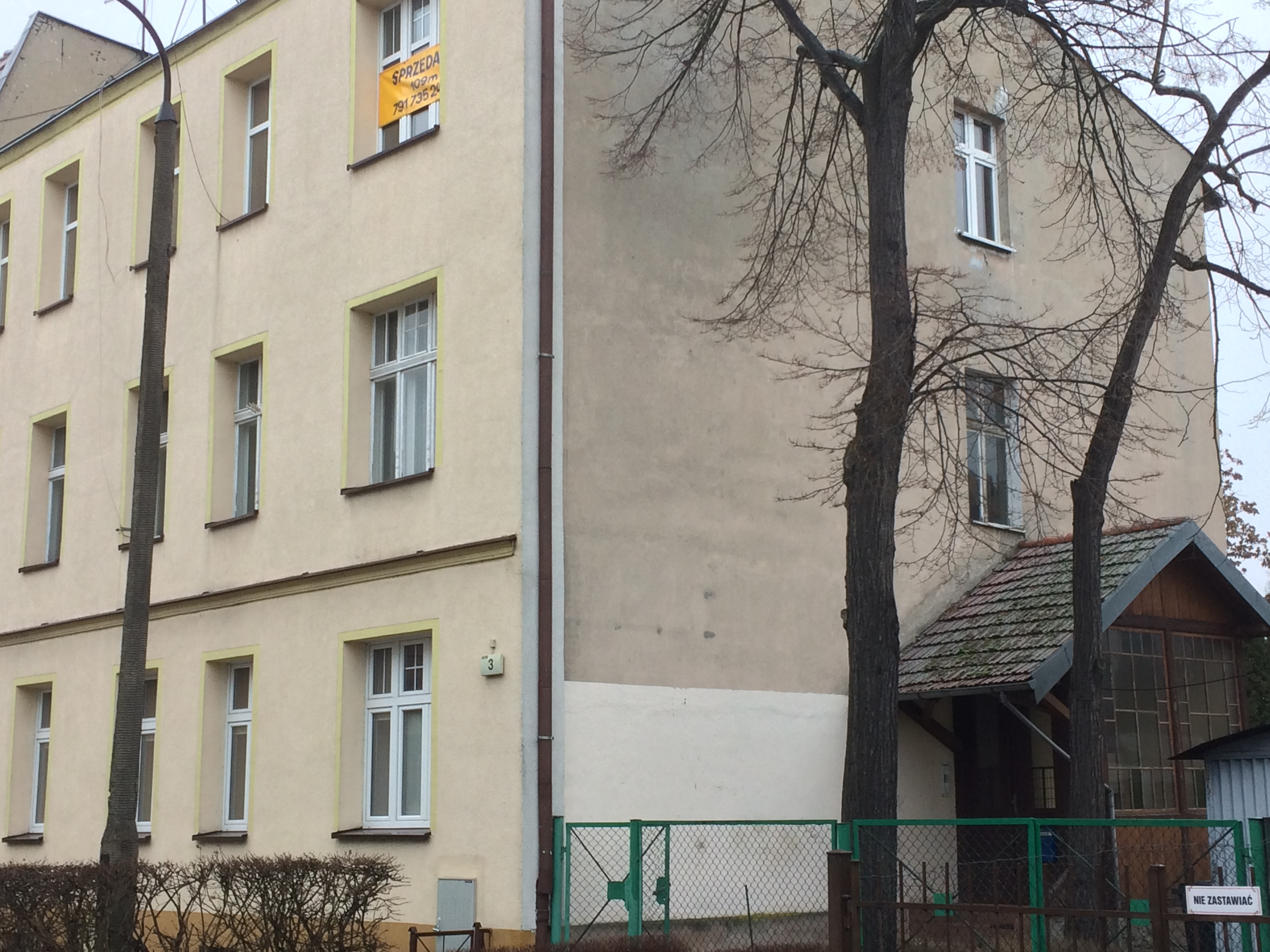
View from the street, with the side entry on the left.

=== Tenement at 4 ===
1912–1915

Art Nouveau

The first owner of then Bollmann Straße 2a, Franz Schwödler, was a supervisor assistant. In the 1920s.

The building features a round avant-corps, topped by a curved gable. The entrance door still retains a transom light. The tenement had been entirely renovated by privat owner in 2019.

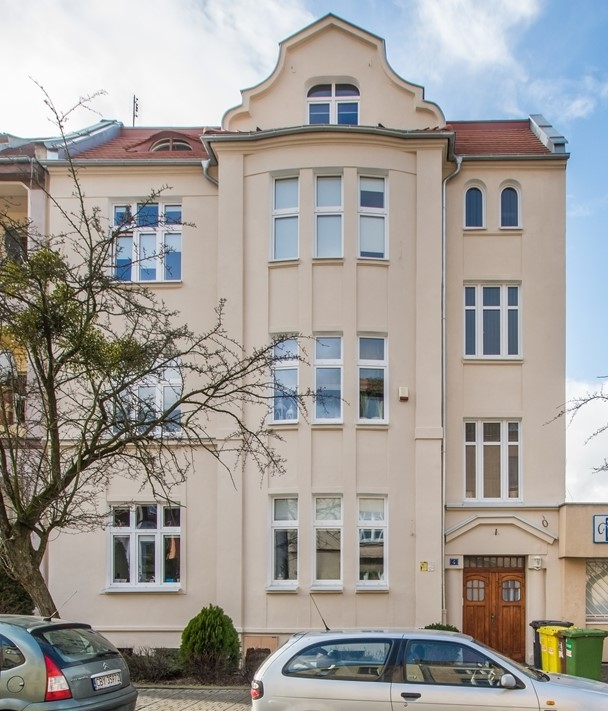
Renovated facade by privat owner.

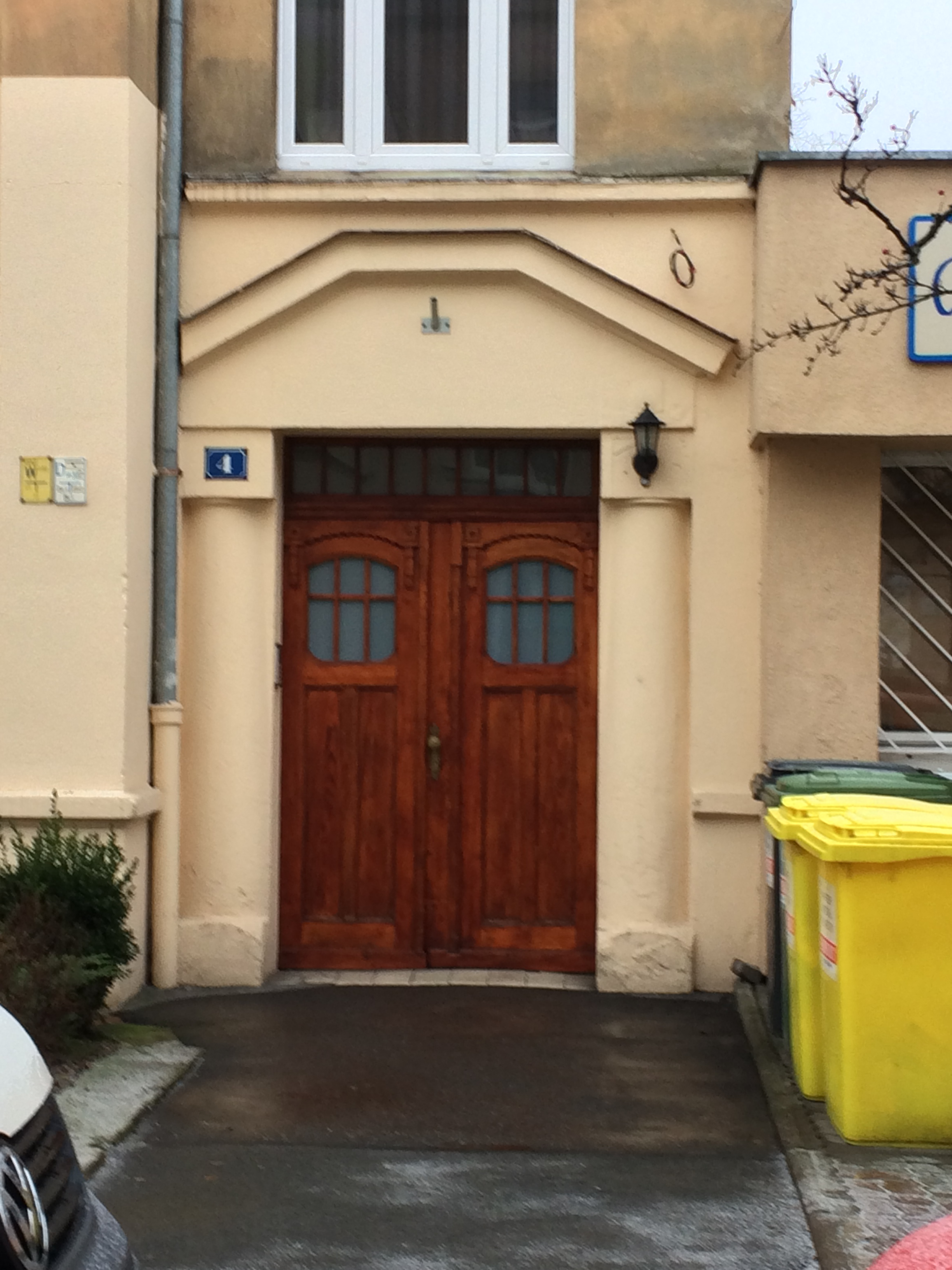
Door view

=== Tenement at 5 ===
1909

Eclecticism

This smaller tenement at then Bollmann Straße 16 was owned initially by Julie Zimmer.

The building still displays a round pediment on its gable, as well as an old wooden side entry, like at neighbouring Nr.3.

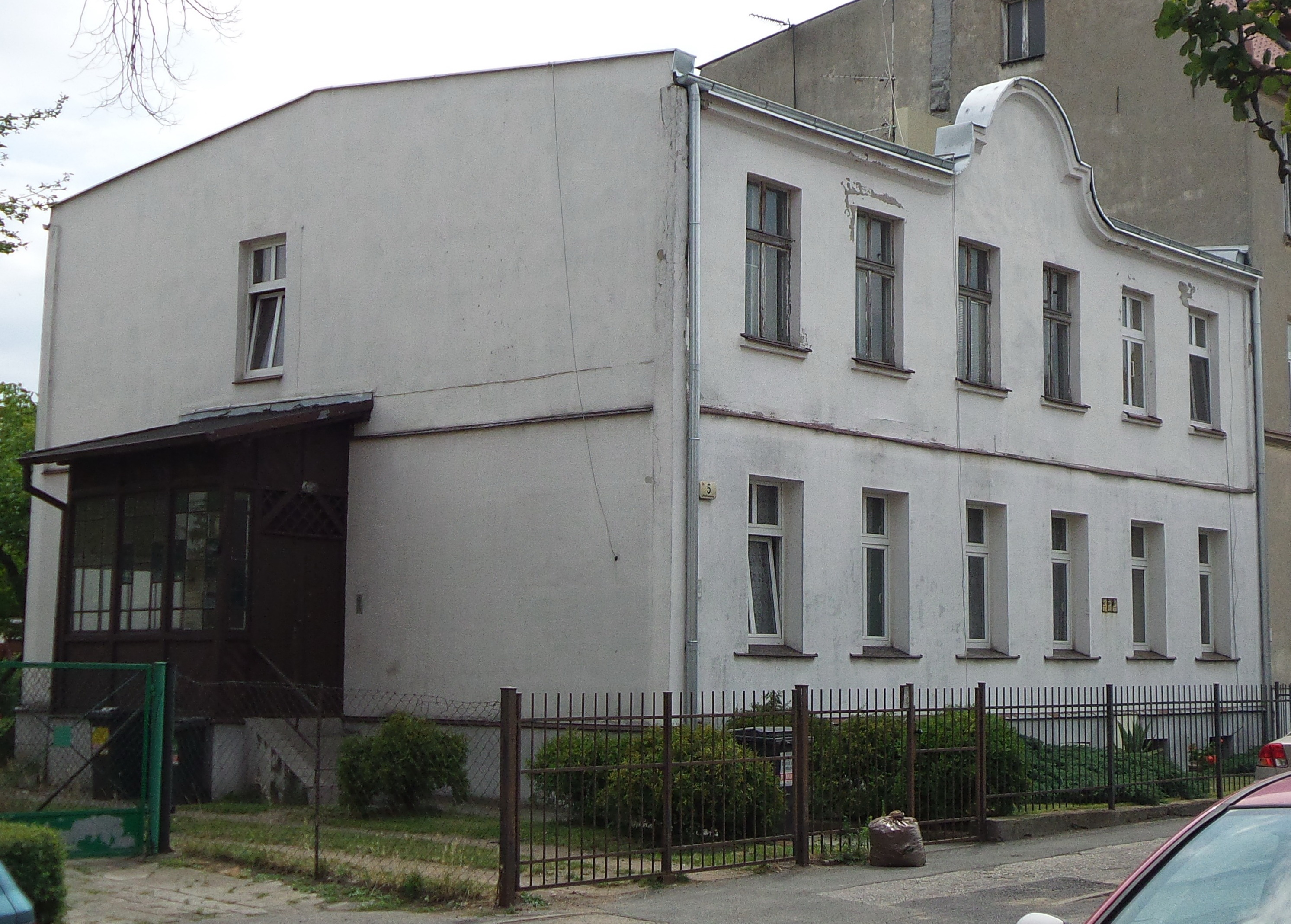
View from the street with the side entry on the right.

=== Tenement at 6 ===
1911–1915, by L. Klein

Art Nouveau

Originally at Bollmann Straße 2b, the tenement echoes Nr.4, with balconies and loggias. Nice wooden door portal, flanked by pilasters.

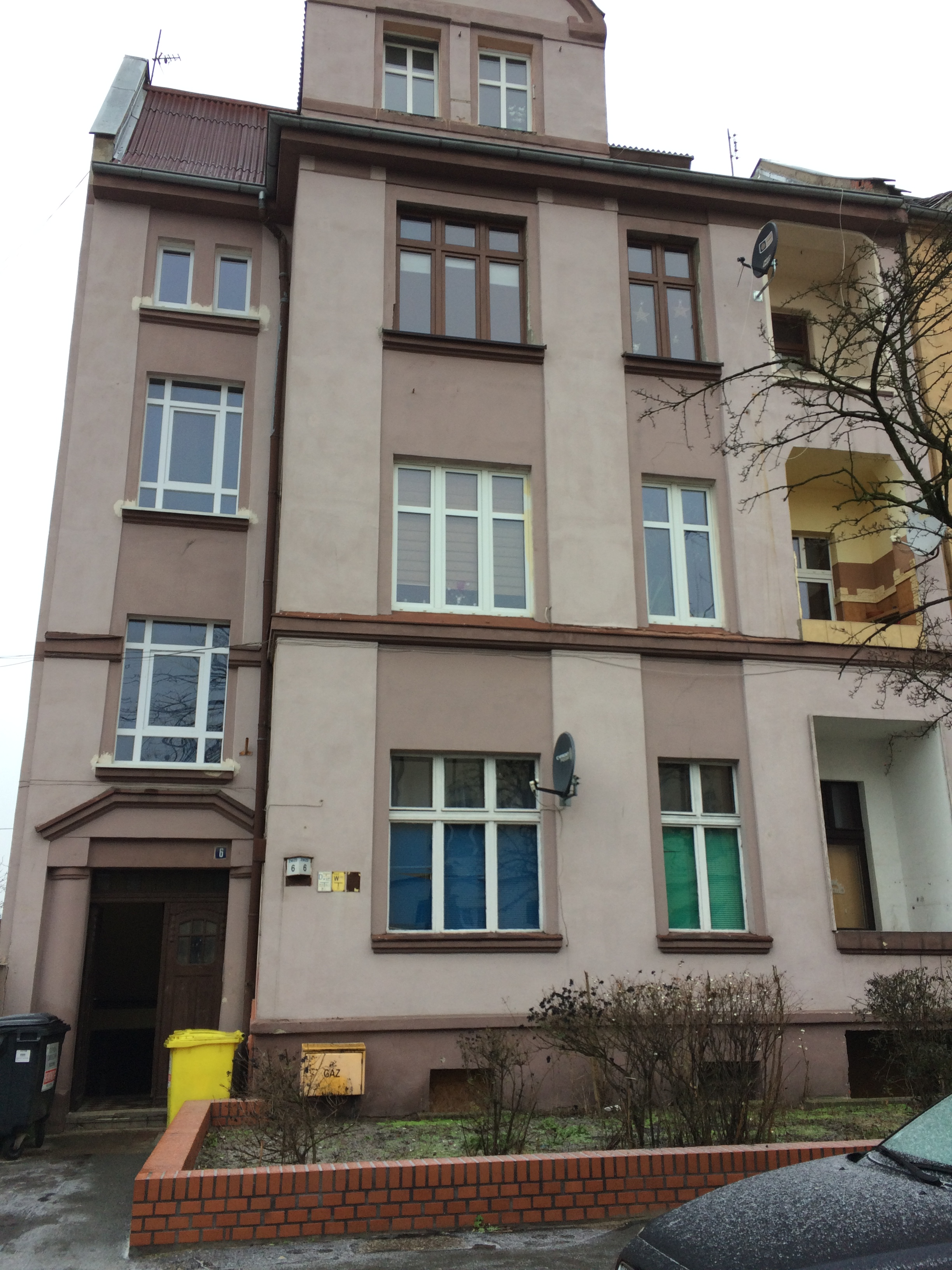
Main frontage

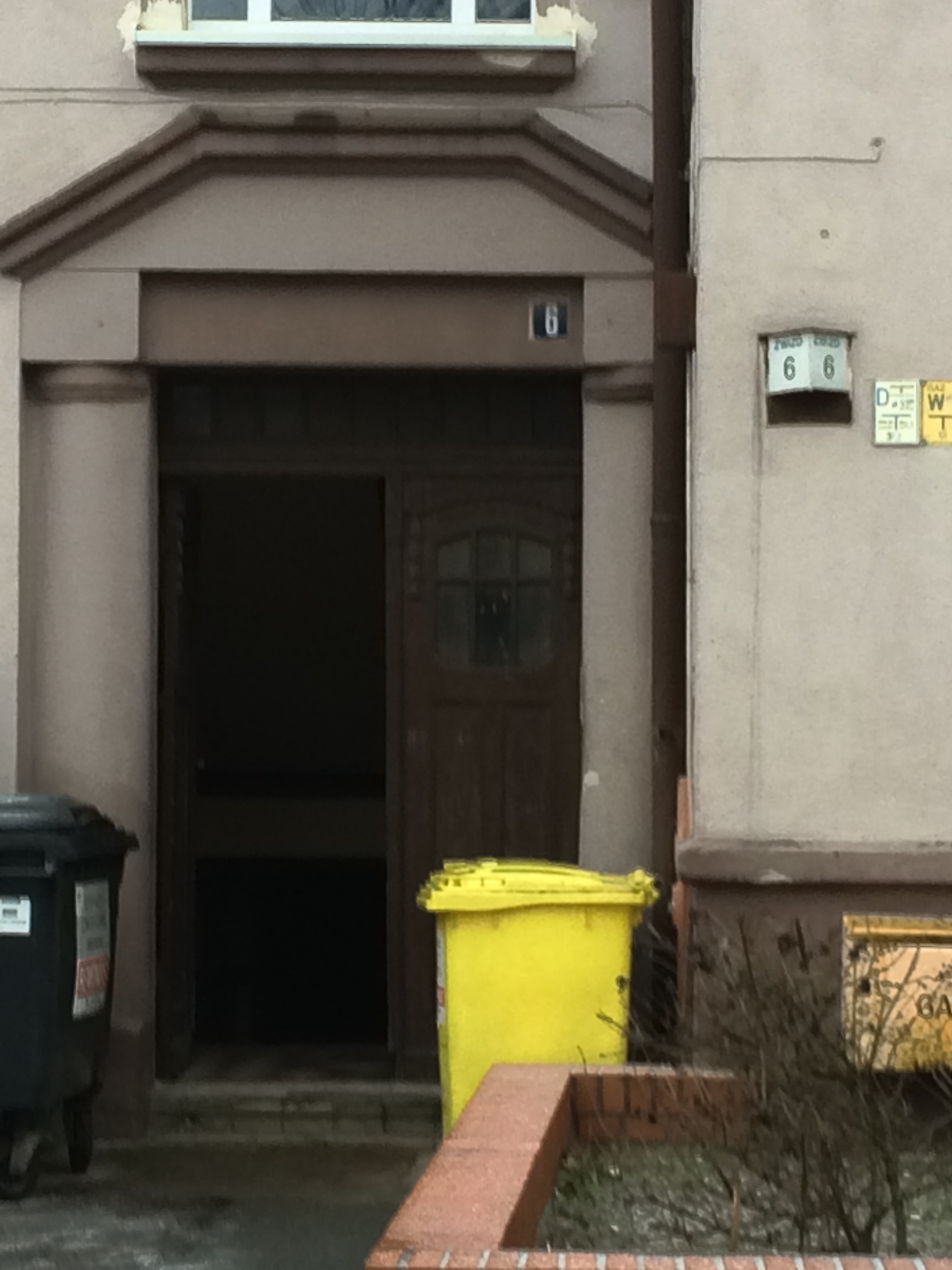
Portal detail

=== Tenement at 7 ===
1911

Art Nouveau

The building had a painter as first owner, Johannes Czaja.

Entirely renovated, the facade only kept its remarkable portal, with its wooden carved door.

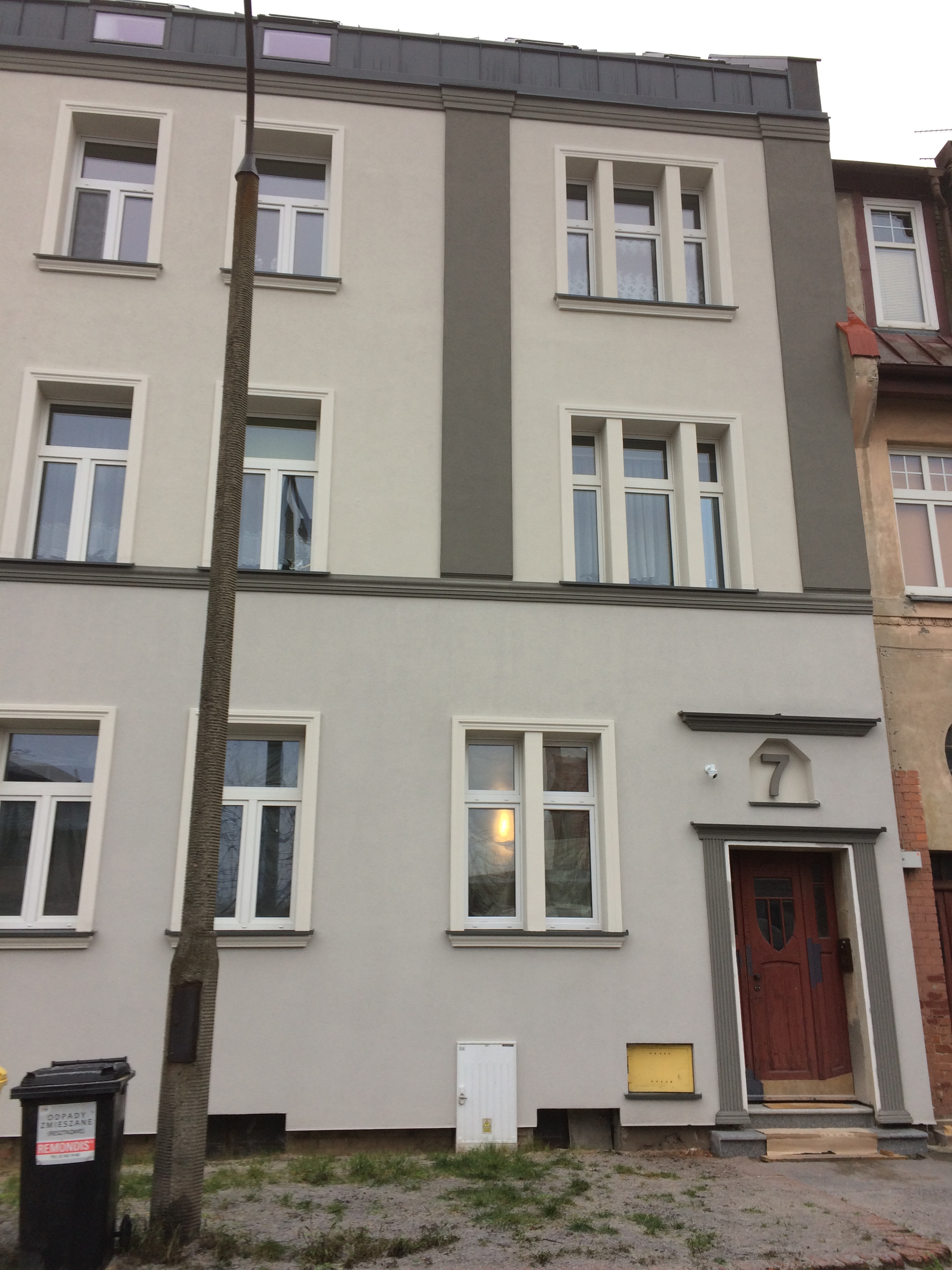
Main elevation

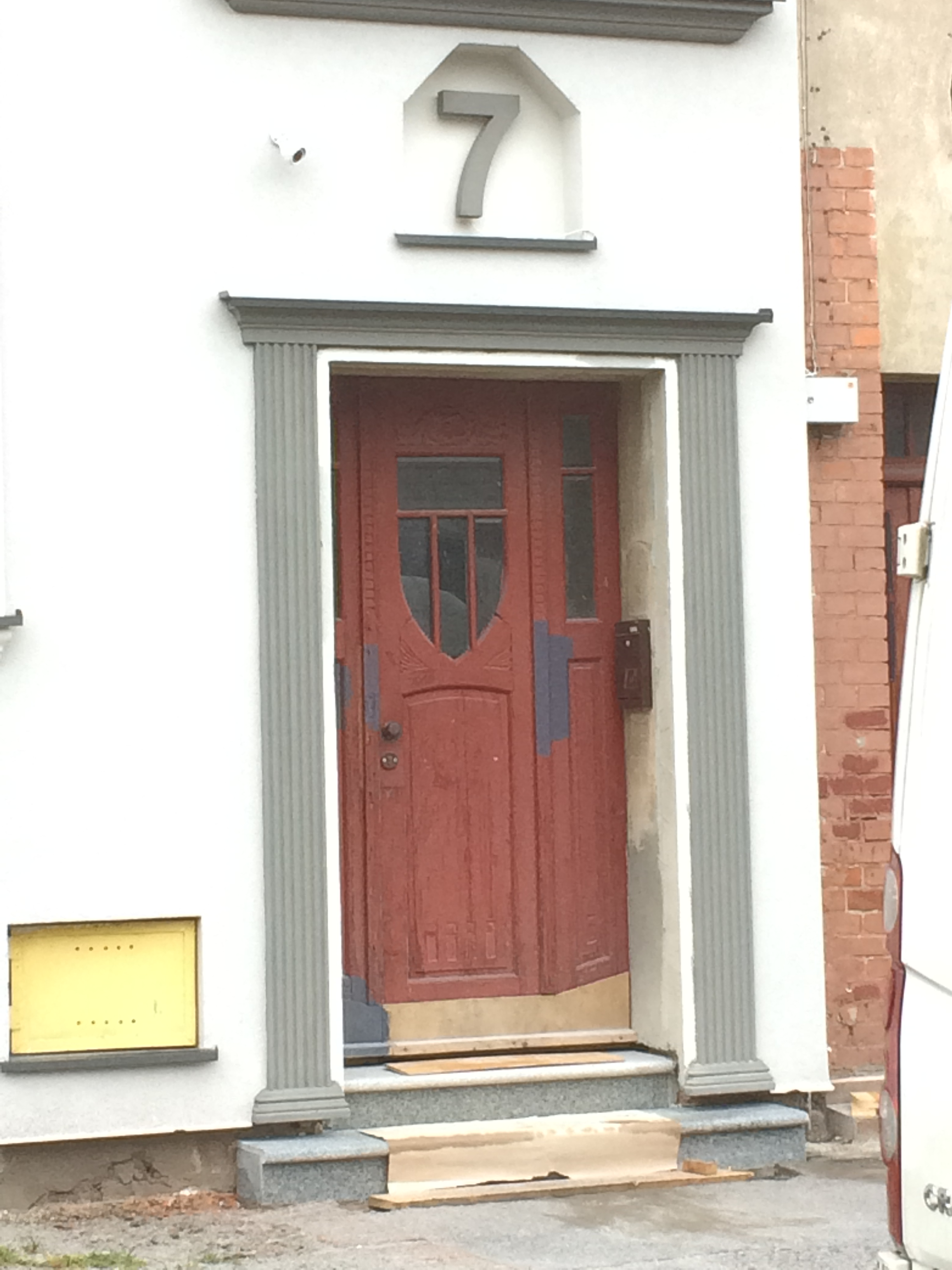
Portal detail

=== Villa at 8 ===
1887

Eclecticism

This house is one of the oldest in the street. Originally at Schröttersdorf 2, it was first owned by Willy Berndt, a teacher for deaf children giving language lessons (German: Kurse für spracheidende), as were his neighbours at Nr.10 and 12. Before moving in, Willy Berndt had been living at Elisabeth Straße 2, now 3 Śniadecki Street; he stayed in this house till the end of WWII. At the re-creation of Poland, the villa was administrated by the province of Poznań (Polish: Starostwo krajowego w Poznaniu).

The villa is one of the oldest in the area, with a nice wooden carved side entry.

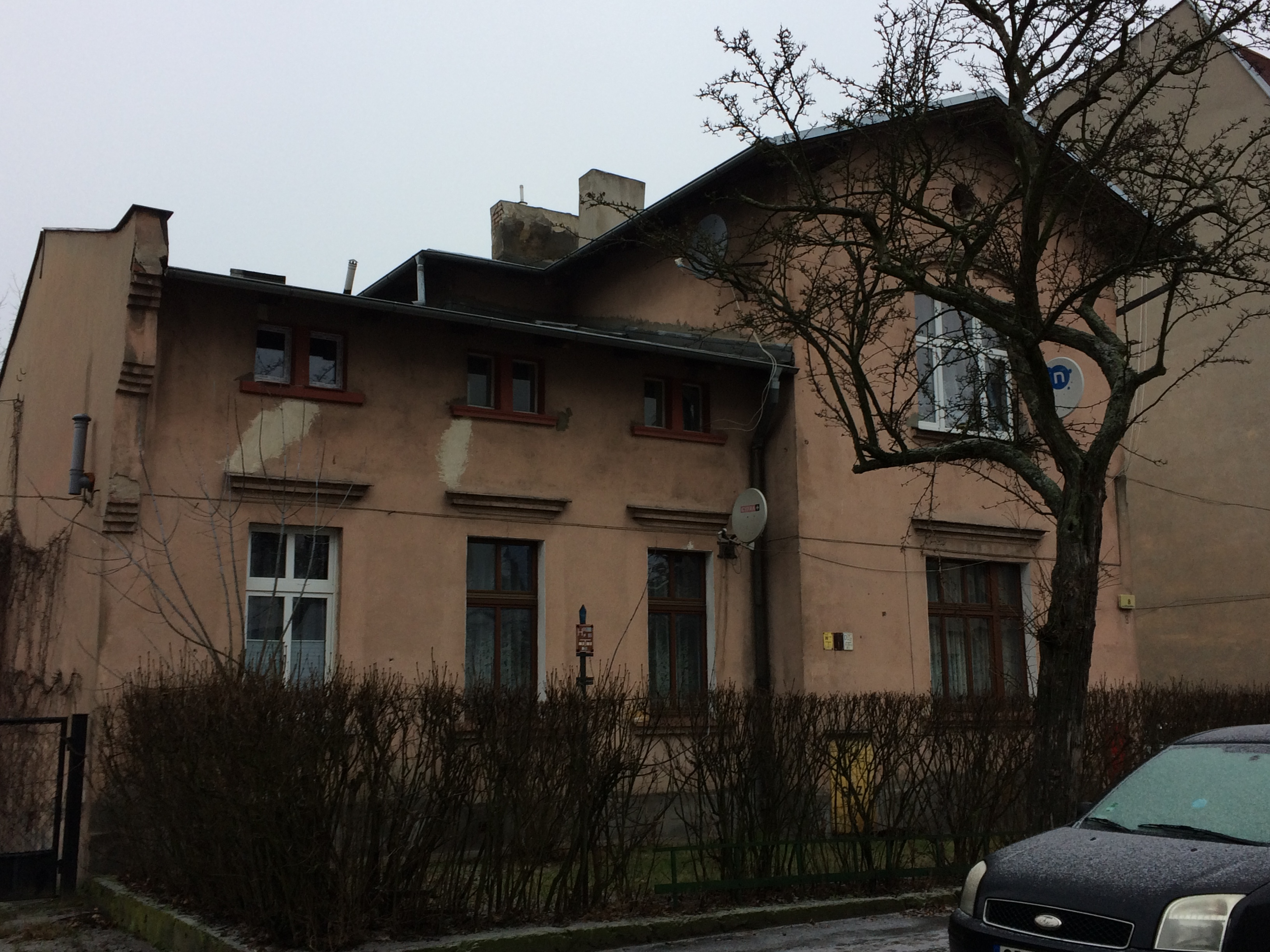
Main facade

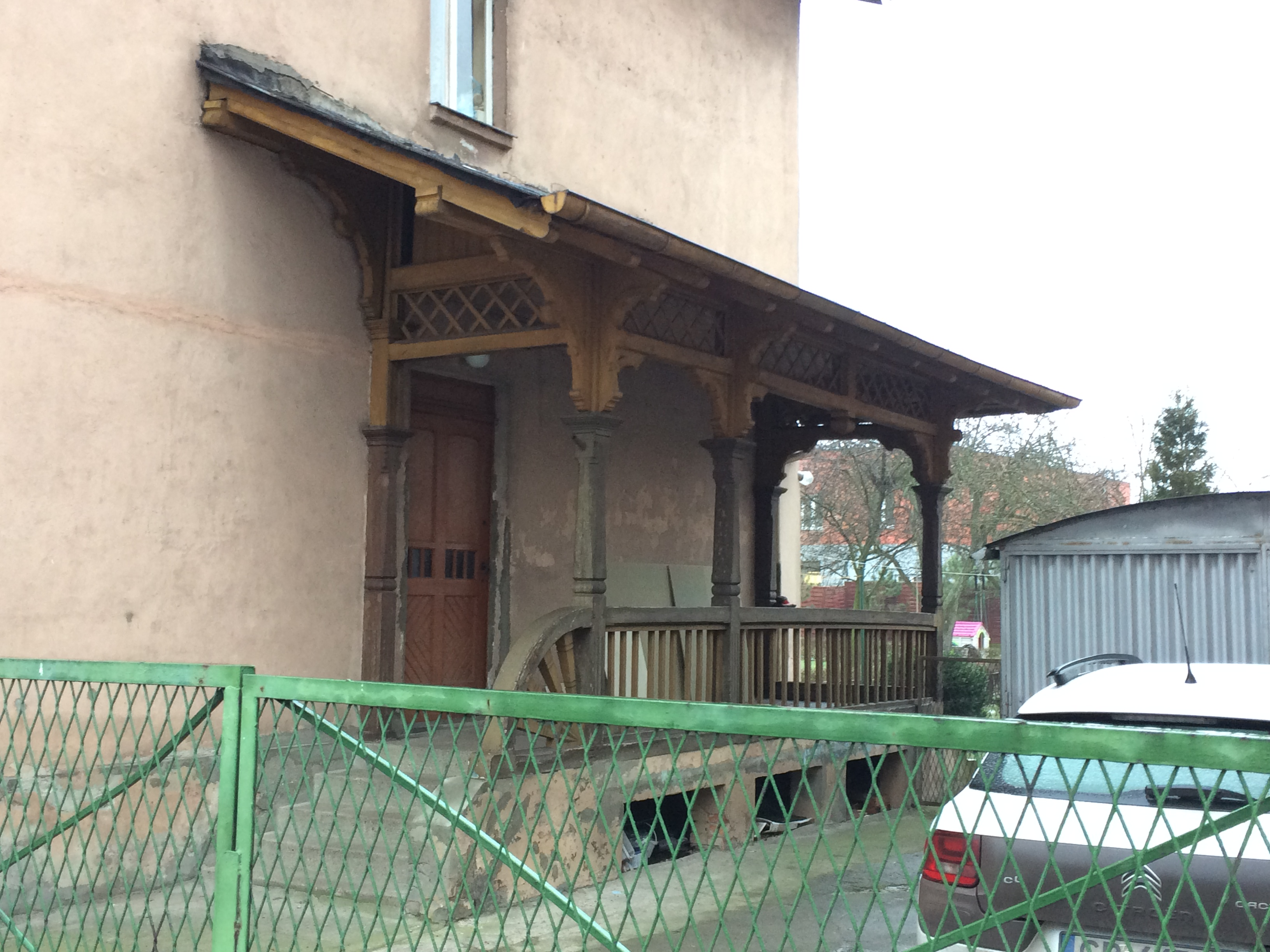
Side view

=== Tenement at 9 ===
1910

Art Nouveau

The first landlord was a telegraph assistant, who moved there after having lived at Promenaden Straße 66 (today's Jagiellońska street).

Typical Art Nouveau tenement facade, from which a part of decoration is unfortunately missing. One can still observe the avant-corps, topped by a terrace, and two oeil-de-boeuf openings.

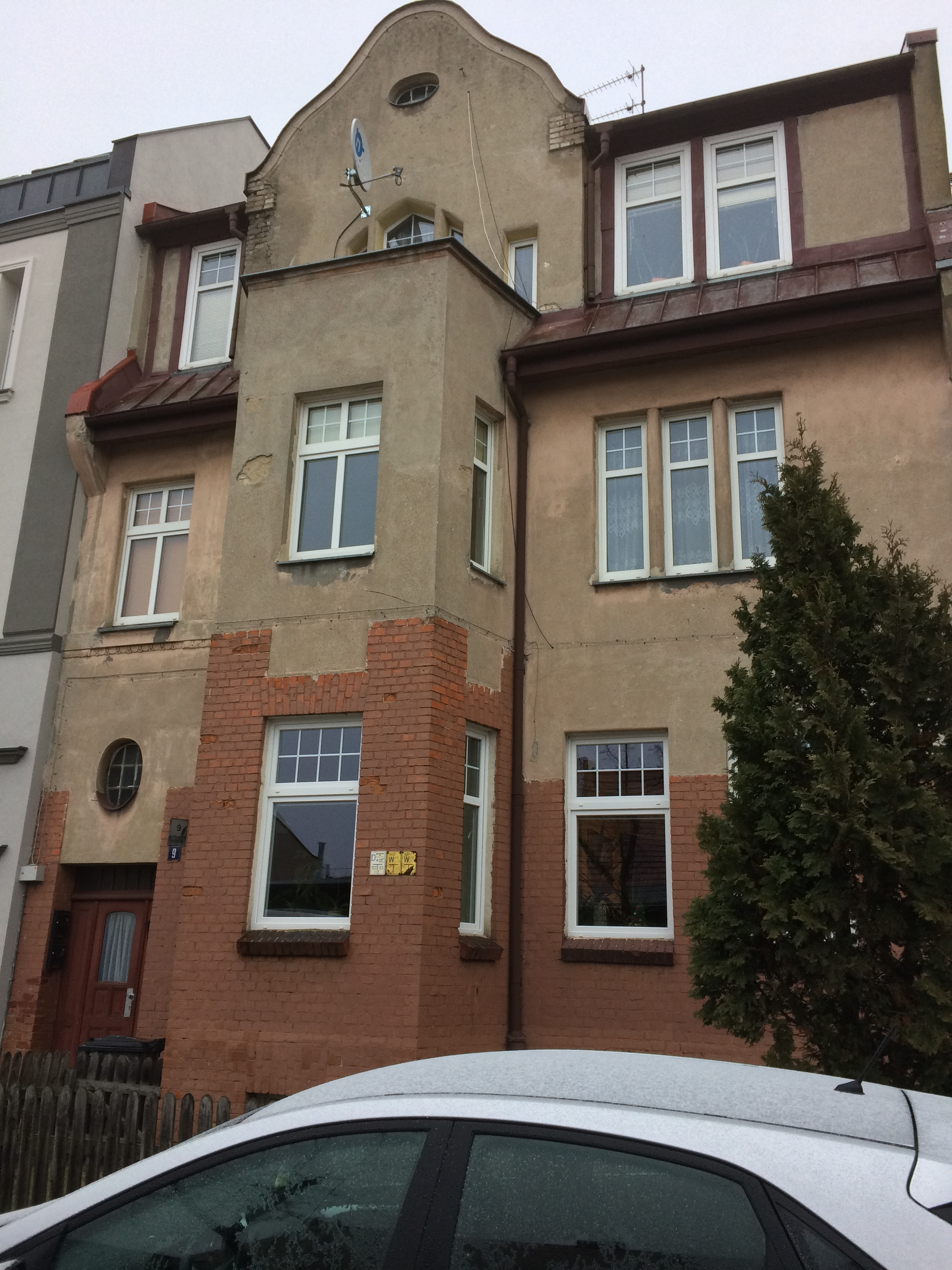
Main elevation

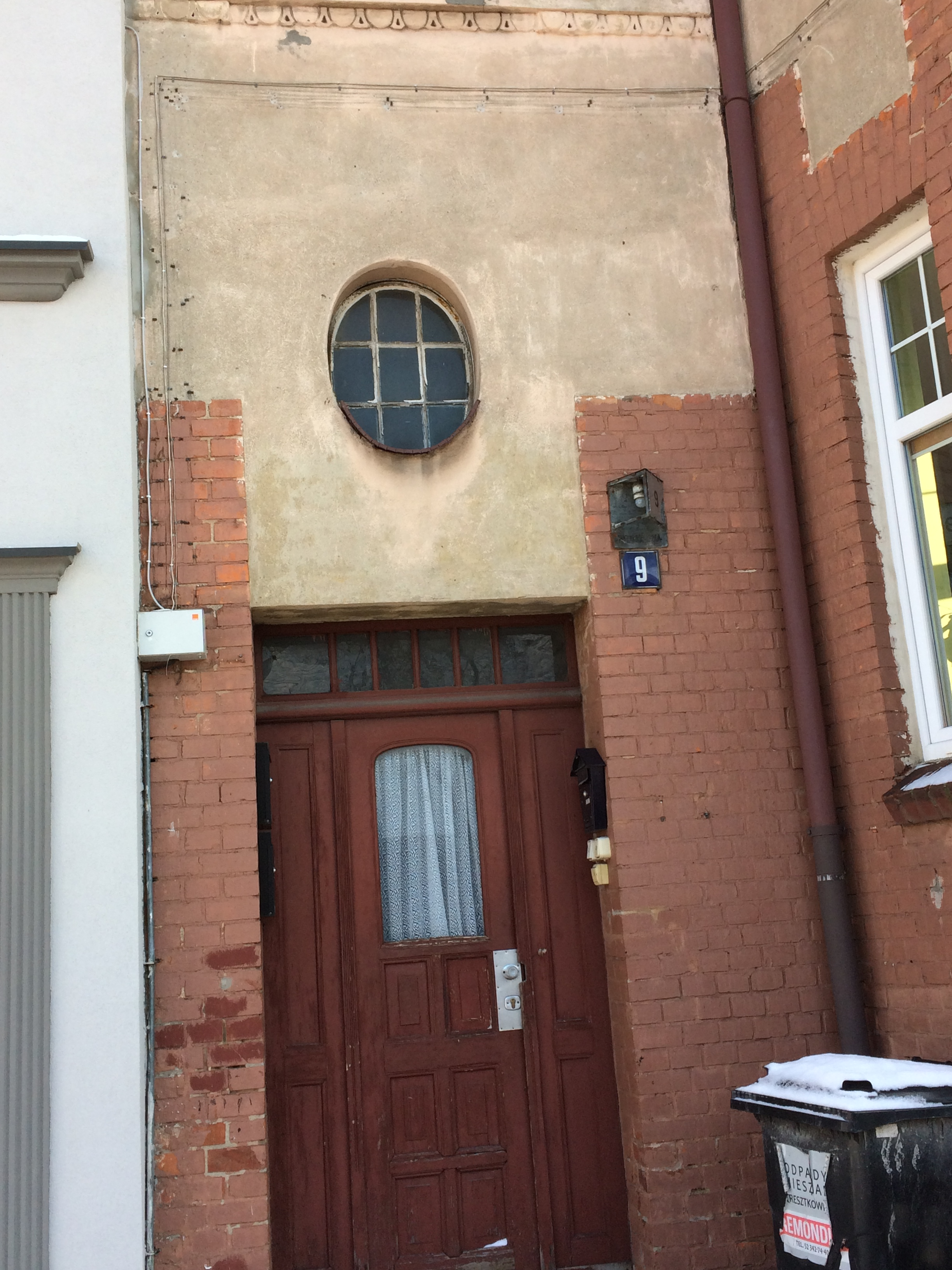
Main door

=== Tenement at 10 ===
1889

Vernacular architecture

One of the oldest house in the street, originally at Schröttersdorf 3b. It first belonged to Adalbert Biedermann, a teacher for deaf children giving language lessons (German: Kurse für spracheidende), as were his neighbours at Nr.8 and 12. Adalbert had been living previously at Hempelstraße 17 (now 3rd May street). He stayed at Krakowska 10 till the end of WWII. In the 1920s, Dr. Teodor Brandowski, working at the Municipal Library (Polish: Miejska Biblioteka), established here.

The house displays a very traditional architecture, illustrative of these old buildings in Bydgoszcz (e.g. at Gdańska Street 37, Gdańska Street 40, Focha Street 6).

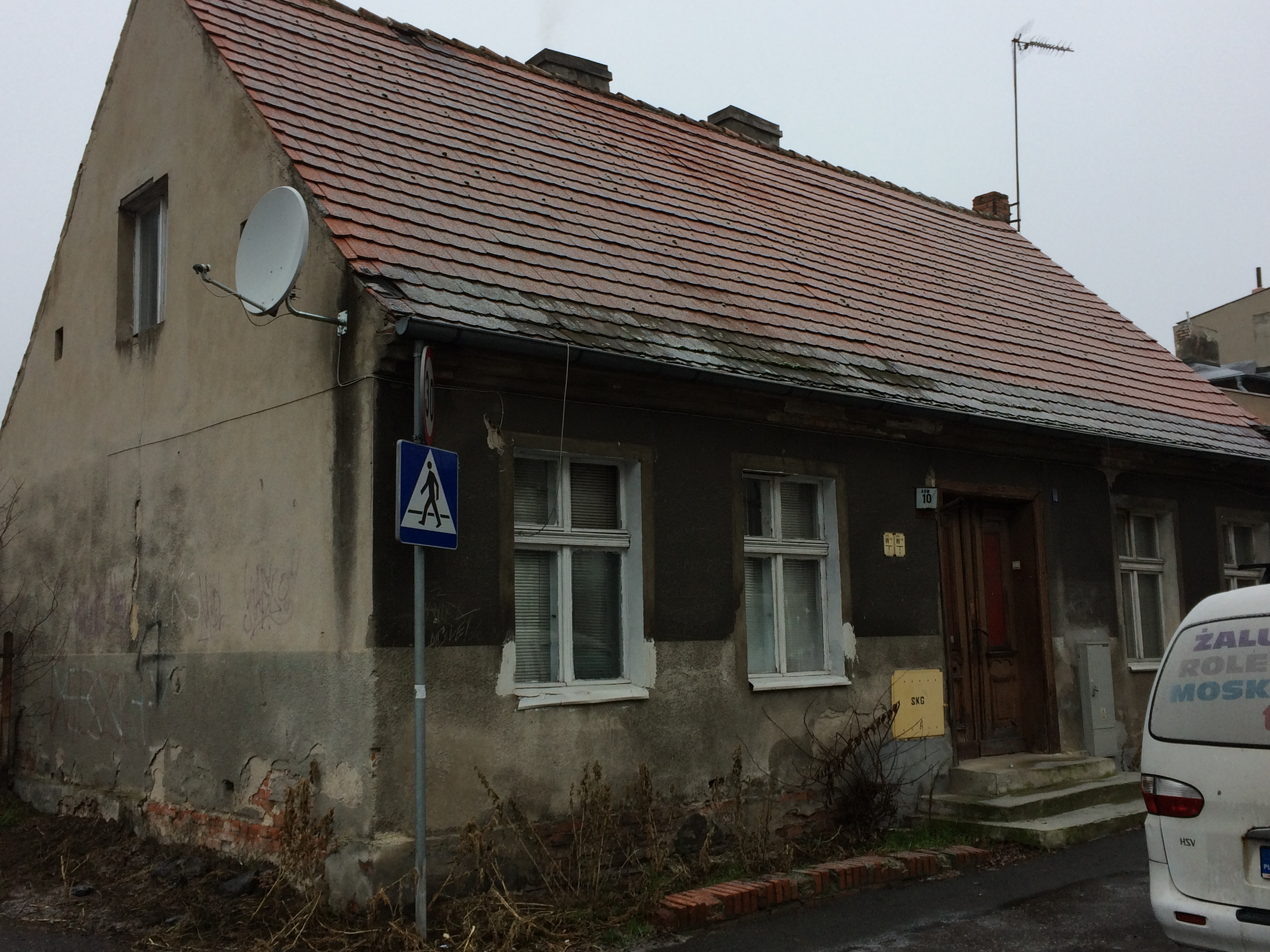
View from the street

=== Villa at 11 ===
1910

Late Art Nouveau, early Modern architecture

Julius Hillermann, a governmental administrative assistant was the first owner of this villa at then Bollmann Straße 13 then 12a. From 1923 to 1927, bishop Michał Kozal (1893–1943) lived in this house; as the patron of the Roman Catholic Diocese of Bydgoszcz, a plaque of his stay has been placed in memoriam.

This large villa displays early modern characteristics, such as long thin tall openings, an angular avant-corps, but also nice eyelid dormers.

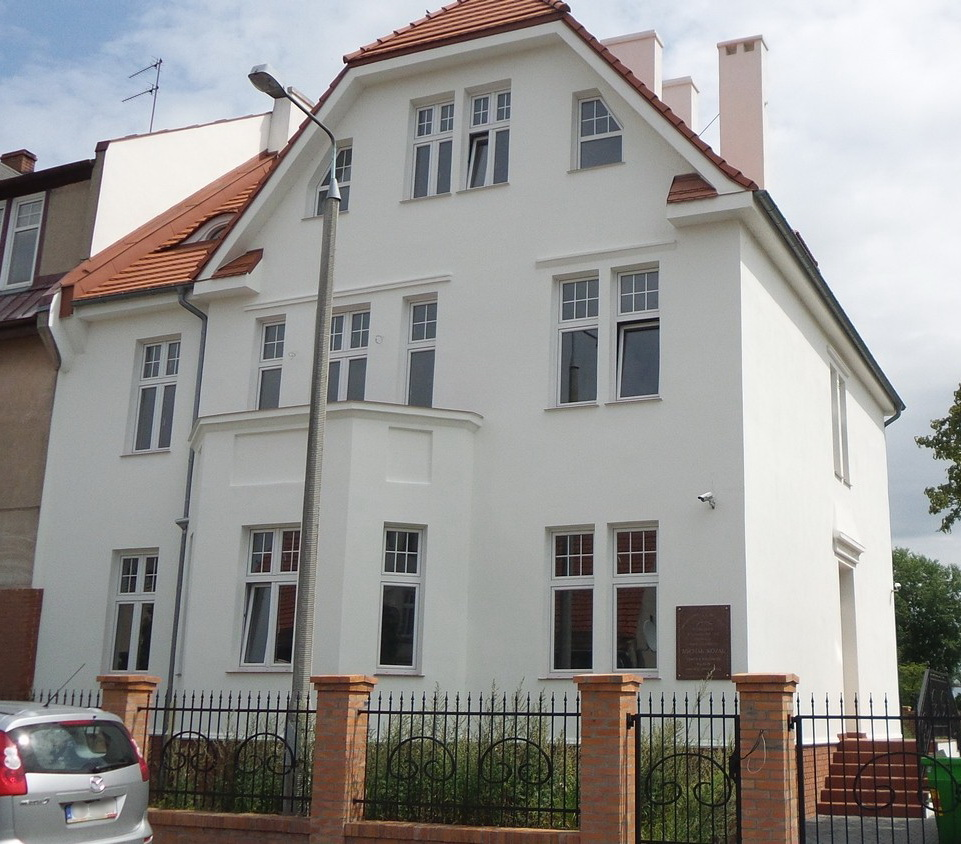
View from the street

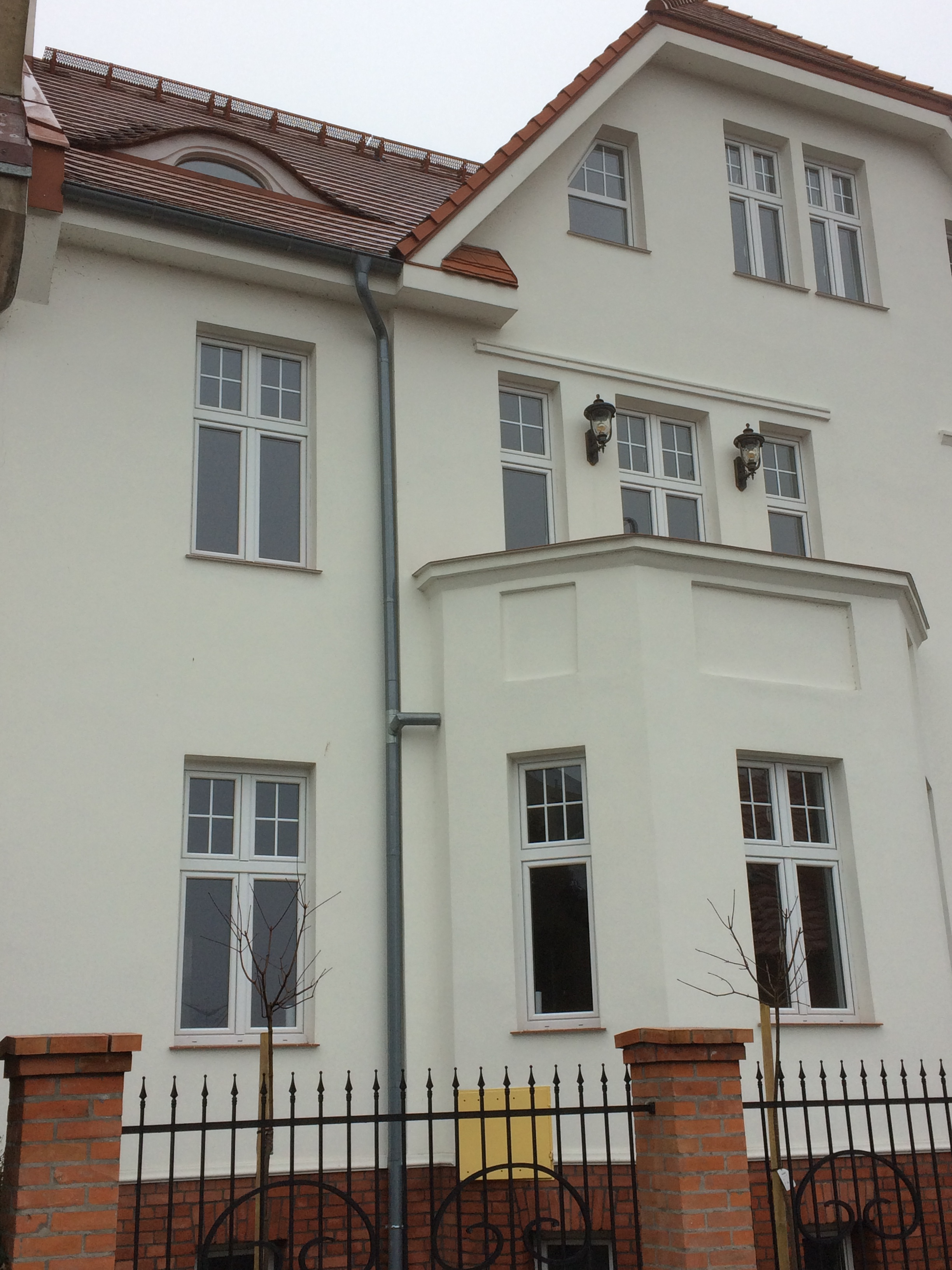
Side view

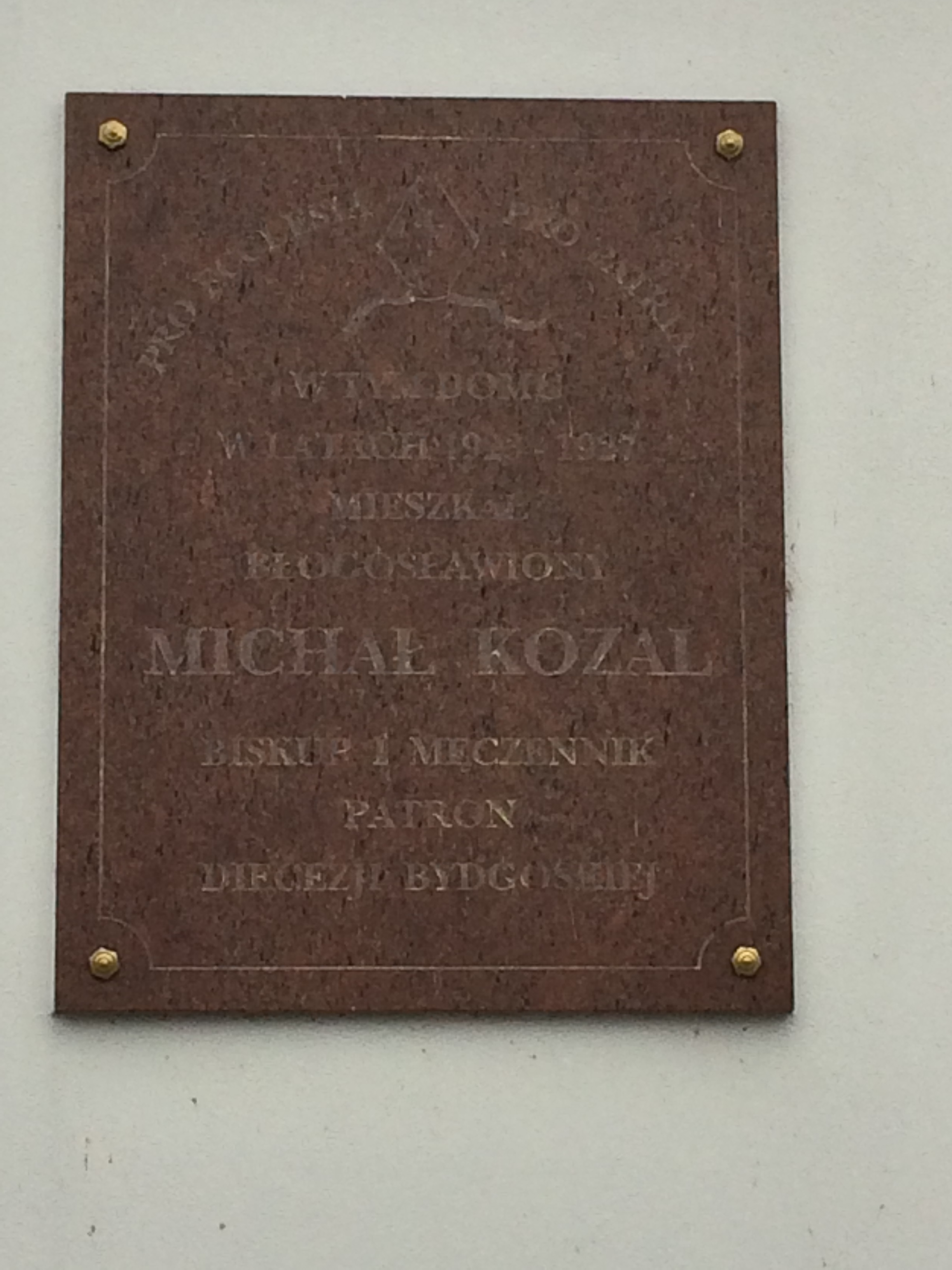
Plaque detail

=== Villa at 12 ===
ca 1905

German Historicism (art)

This villa at then Bollmann Straße 5 was owned at the beginning of the 20th century by Eduard Podolski, a teacher for deaf children, giving language lessons (German: Kurse für spracheidende), as were his neighbours at Nr.8 and 10. He stayed in this house till the end of World War II. At the re-creation of Poland, the villa was administered by the province of Poznań.

Traditional old brick house from the end of the 19th century, as mentioned by the weather vane.

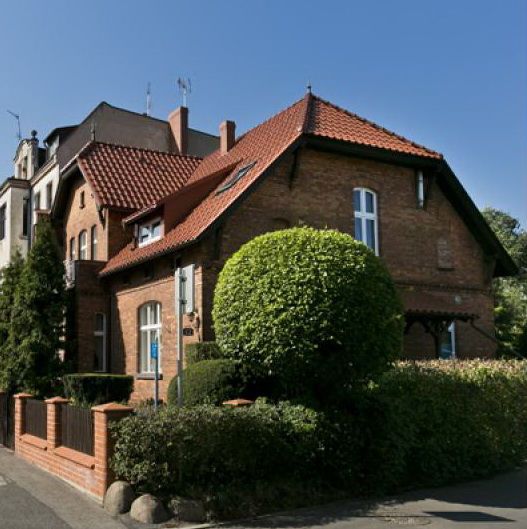
View from street intersection

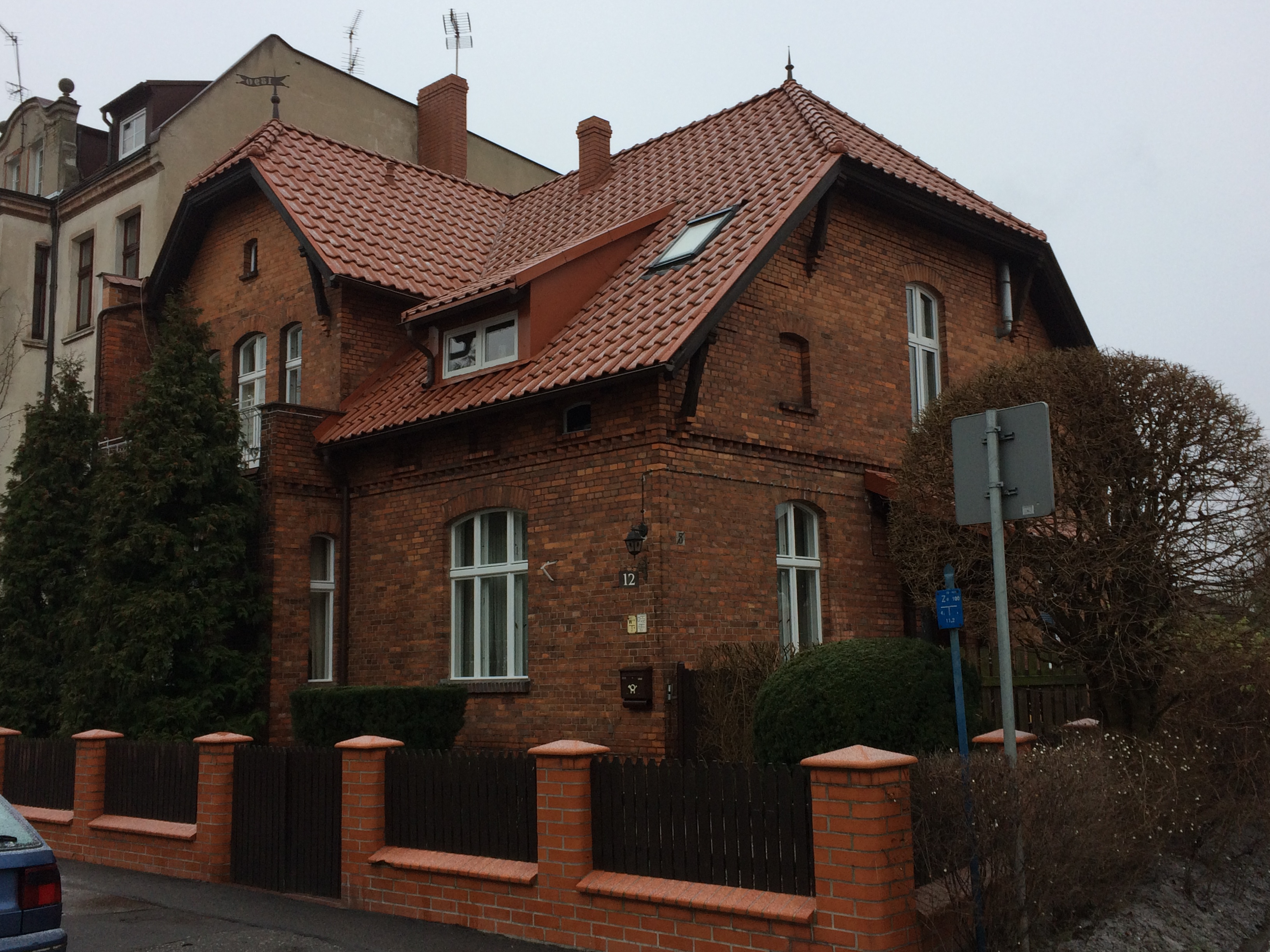
View from the street

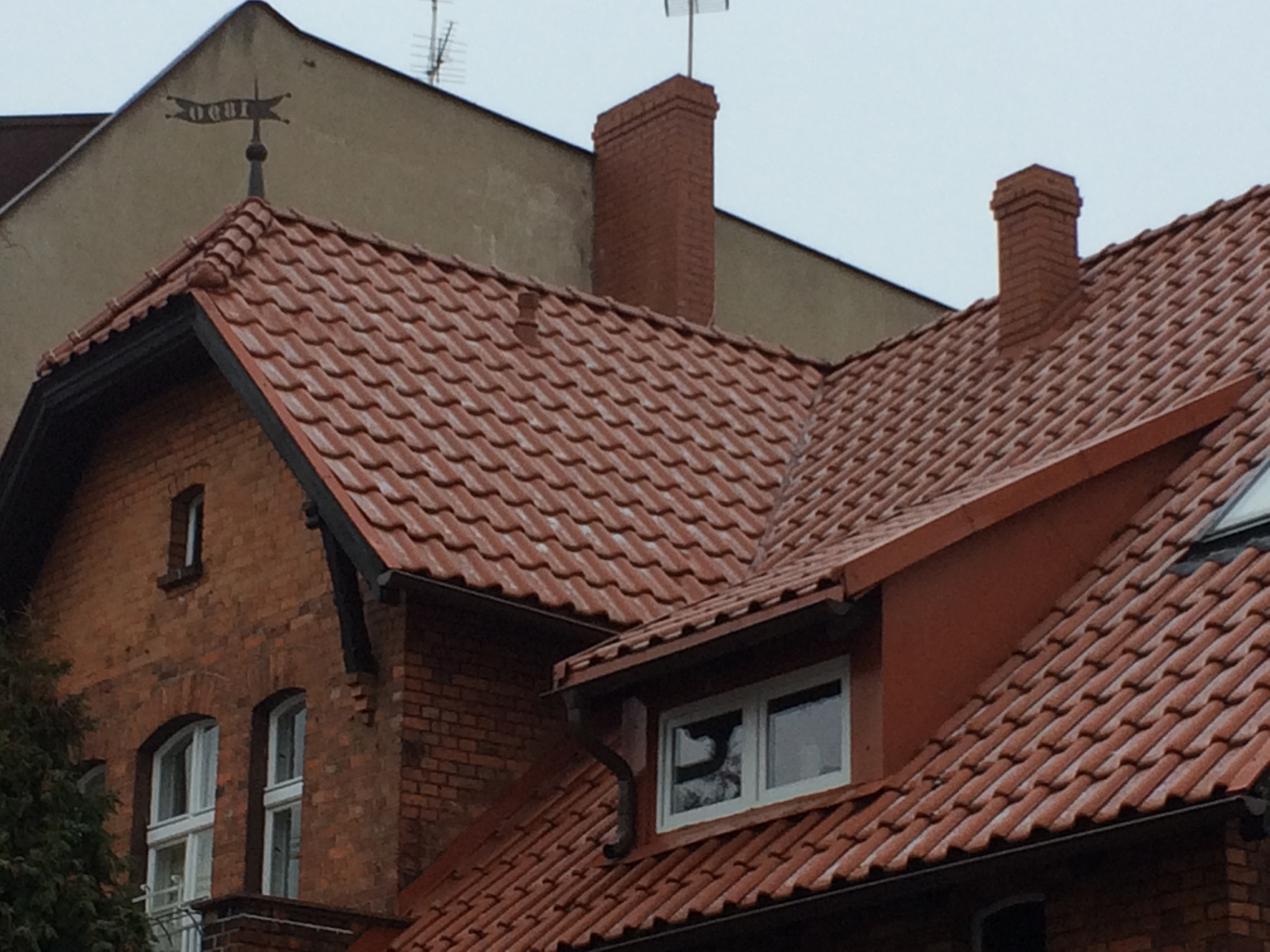
Detail of the gable and the weather vane

=== Tenement at 13 ===
1910

Early Modern architecture, elements of Art Nouveau

This semi-detached house at then Bollmann Straße 12, was commissioned by Paul Kramm, working in the telegraph business. In the 1920s, it was the property of a physician, Dr Klimkiewicz.

Massive house with a bony avant-corps. The entry facade on the side mixes Art Nouveau motifs on the door pediment and modern style openings above.

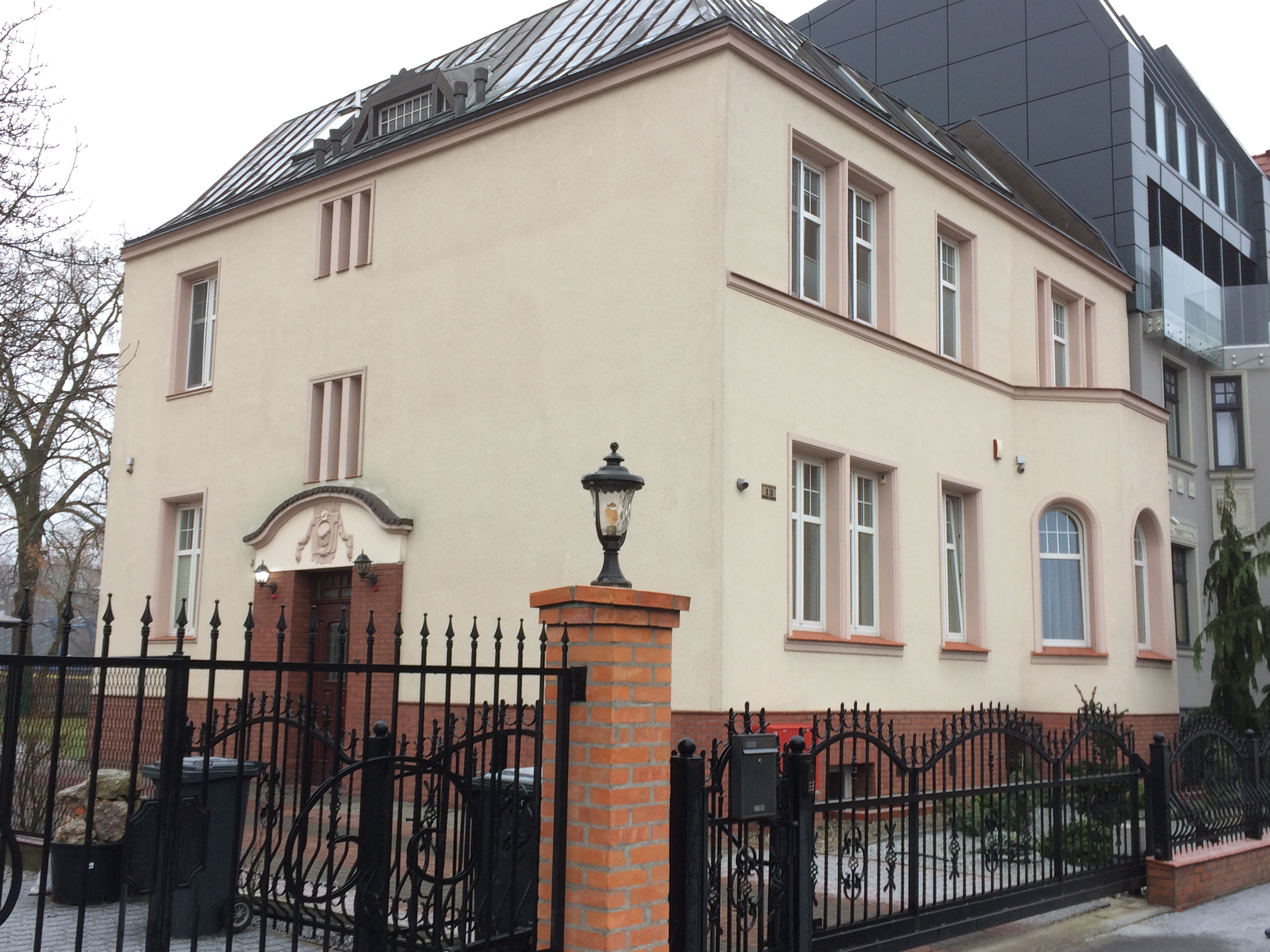
View from the street

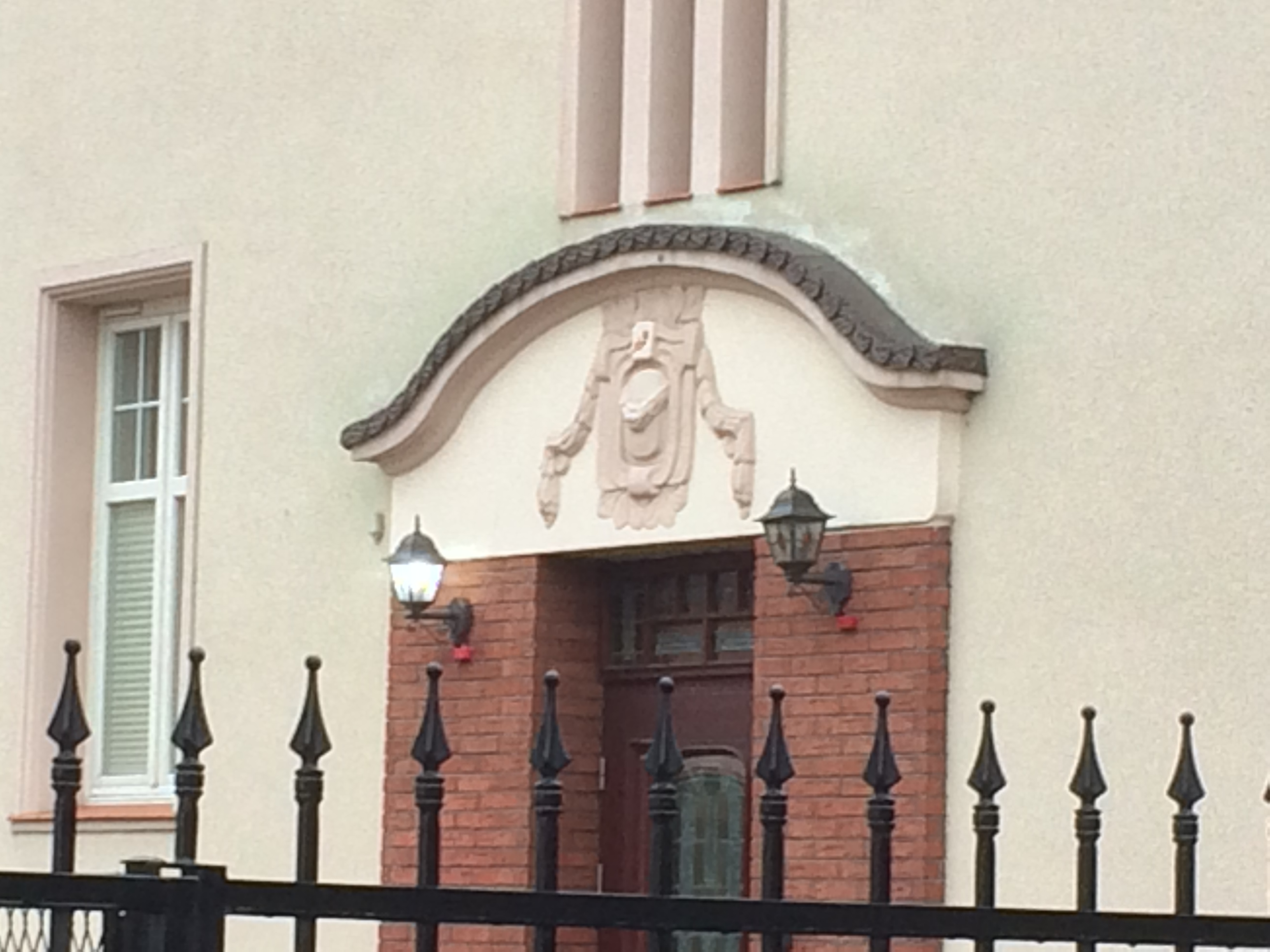
Portal decoration

=== Tenement at 14 ===
1909

Art Nouveau

This building located initially at Bollmann Straße 6 was first owned by Gustav Winter, a rentier. A few years later, another rentier, August Blumenstein, bought the tenement: he lived till the outbreak of WWII.

The main elevation echoes the other Art Nouveau buildings in the same street from this period (Nr.4 and 6), with its middle avant-corps, the curved gable and the flanking shed dormers.

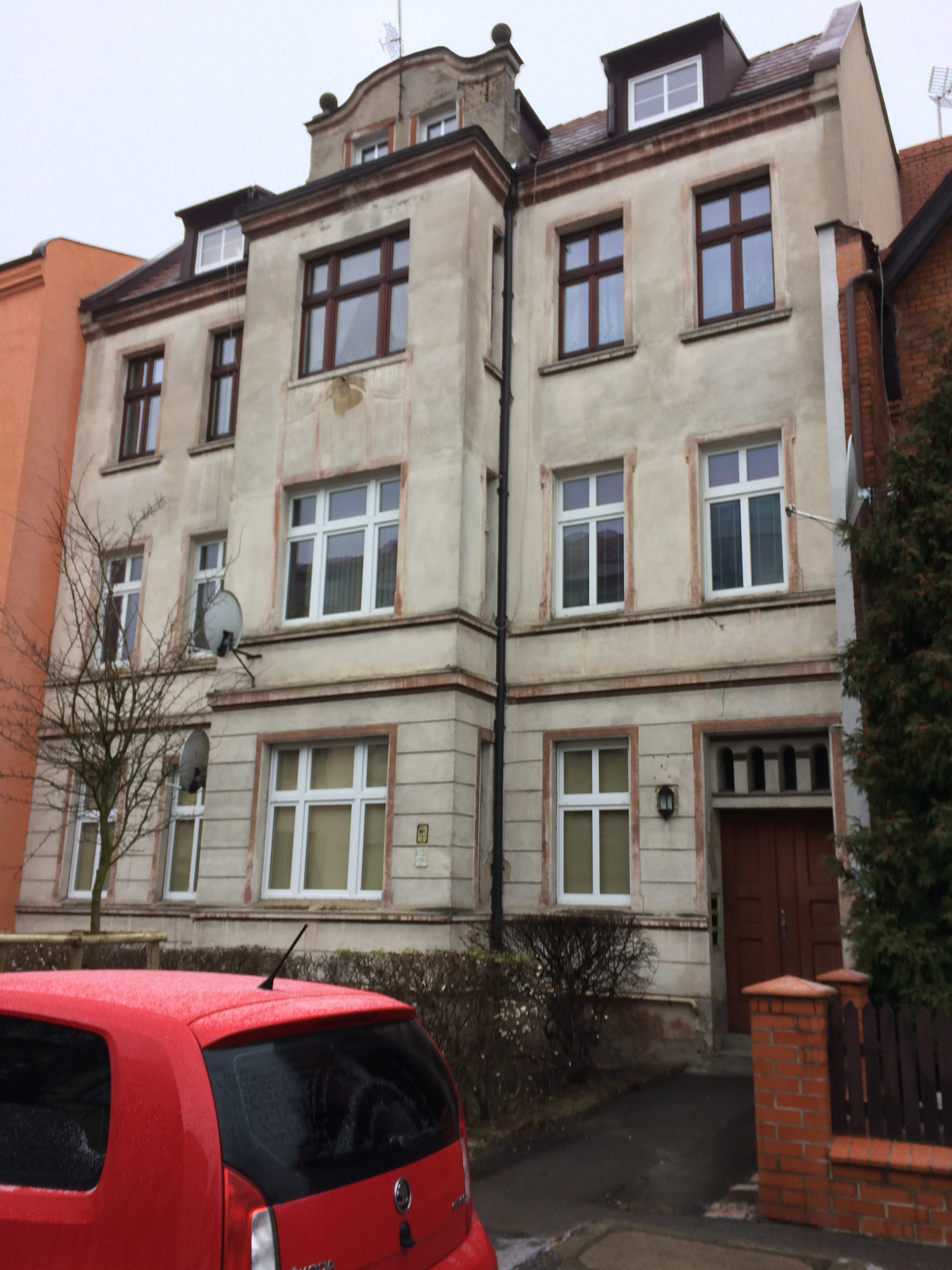
Main elevation

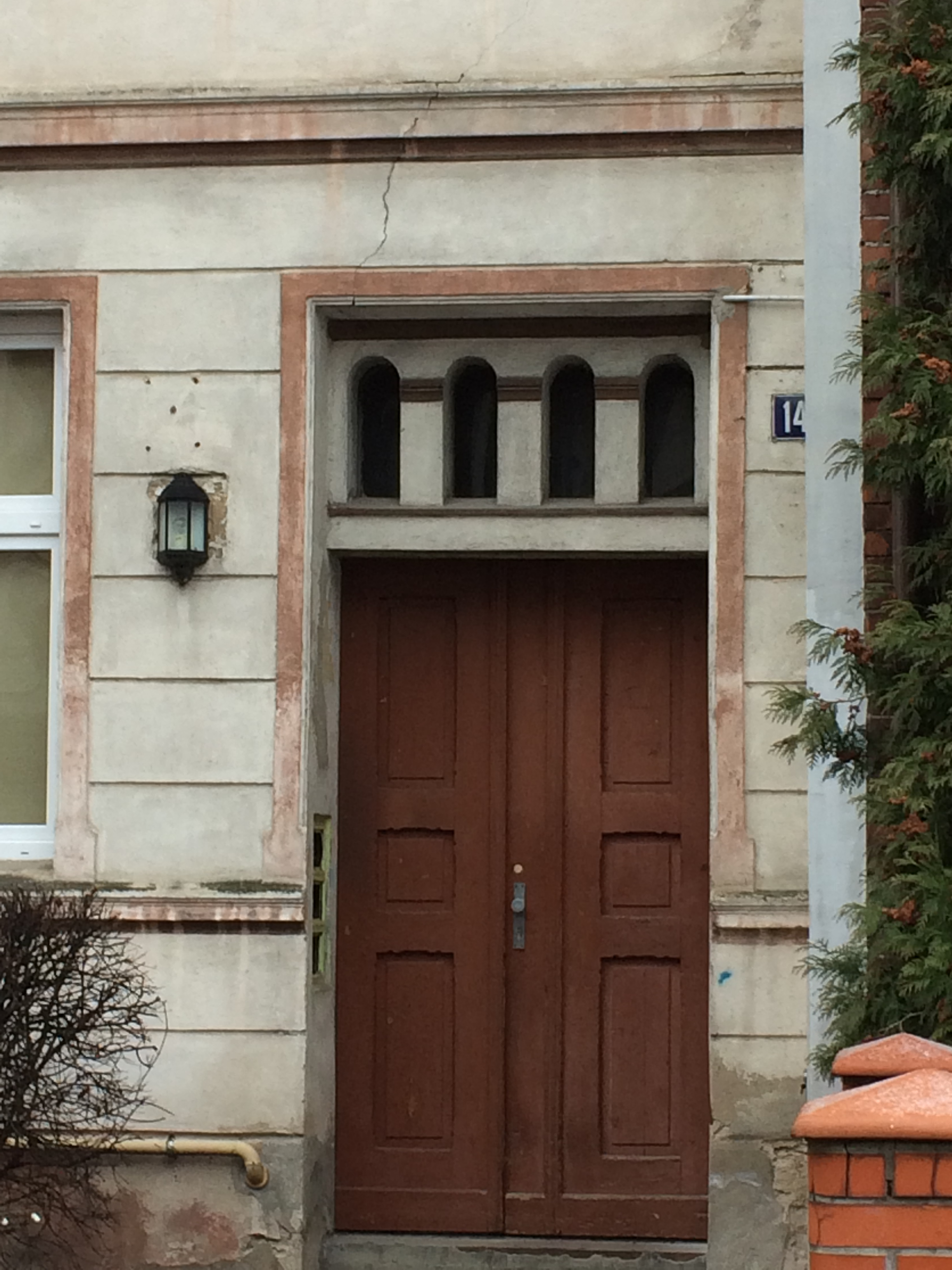
Door detail

=== Tenement at 15 ===
1910

Art Nouveau, elements of Modern architecture

Carl Schmerberg, working as assistant for the telegraph, was the first landlord of the building at then Bollmann Straße 11.

In 2016, a heavy reconstruction of the tenement has revived some nice Art Nouveau details: large cartouche, window pediment or superbly adorned oeil-de-boeuf above the main entrance.

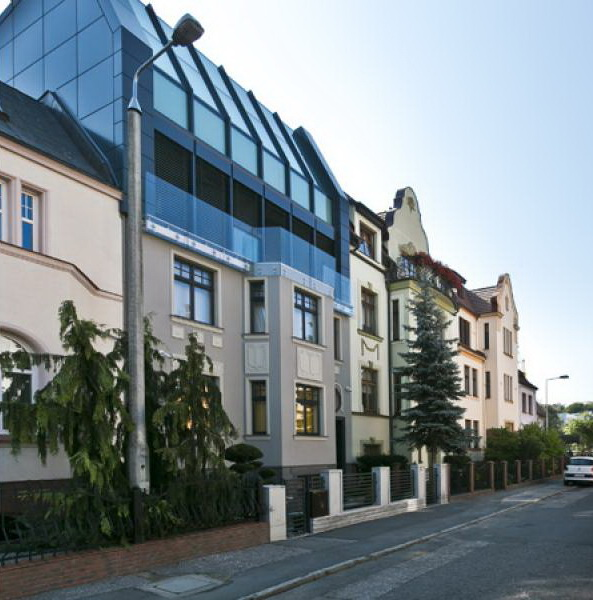
View of Nr.15, with Nr.17 & 19 in the background

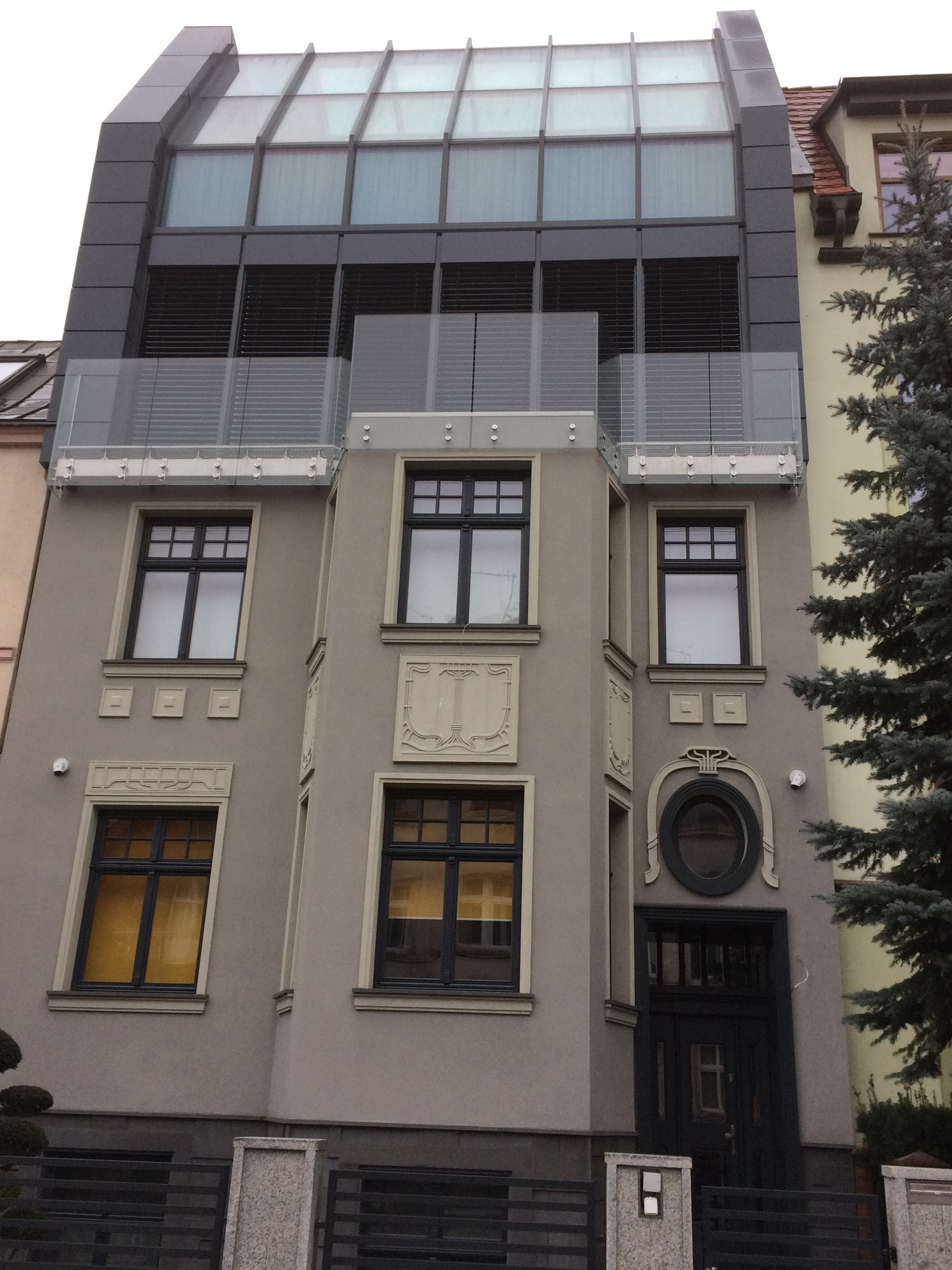
Main elevation

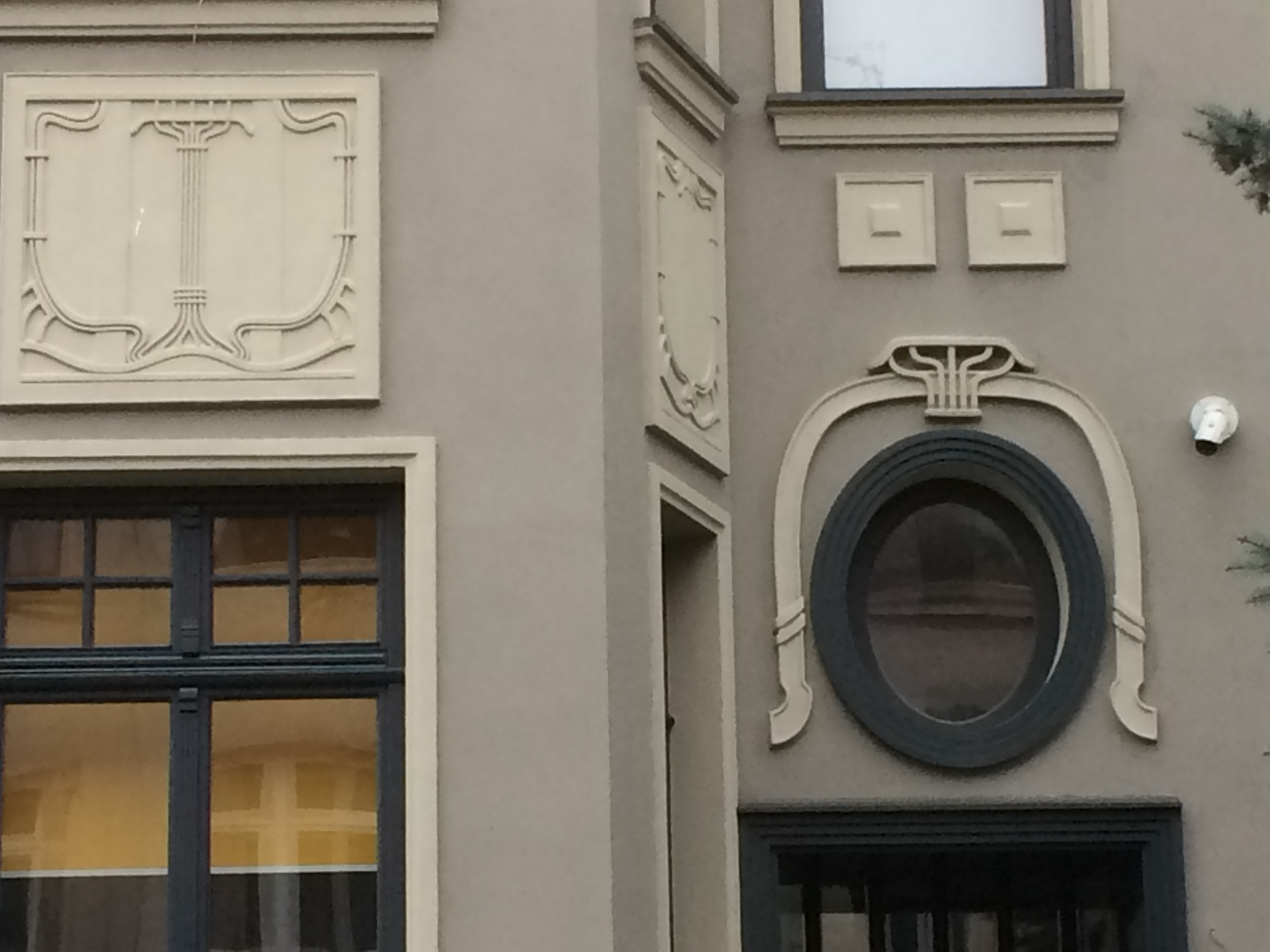
Portal decoration

=== Tenement at 16 ===
1910, Georg Winter

Functionalism

Paul Bigalke, a rentier, commissioned the building at then Bollmann Straße 7.

The building has been entirely reconstructed in the 1930s with a modern architectural style. Only the main door kept some Art Nouveau design.

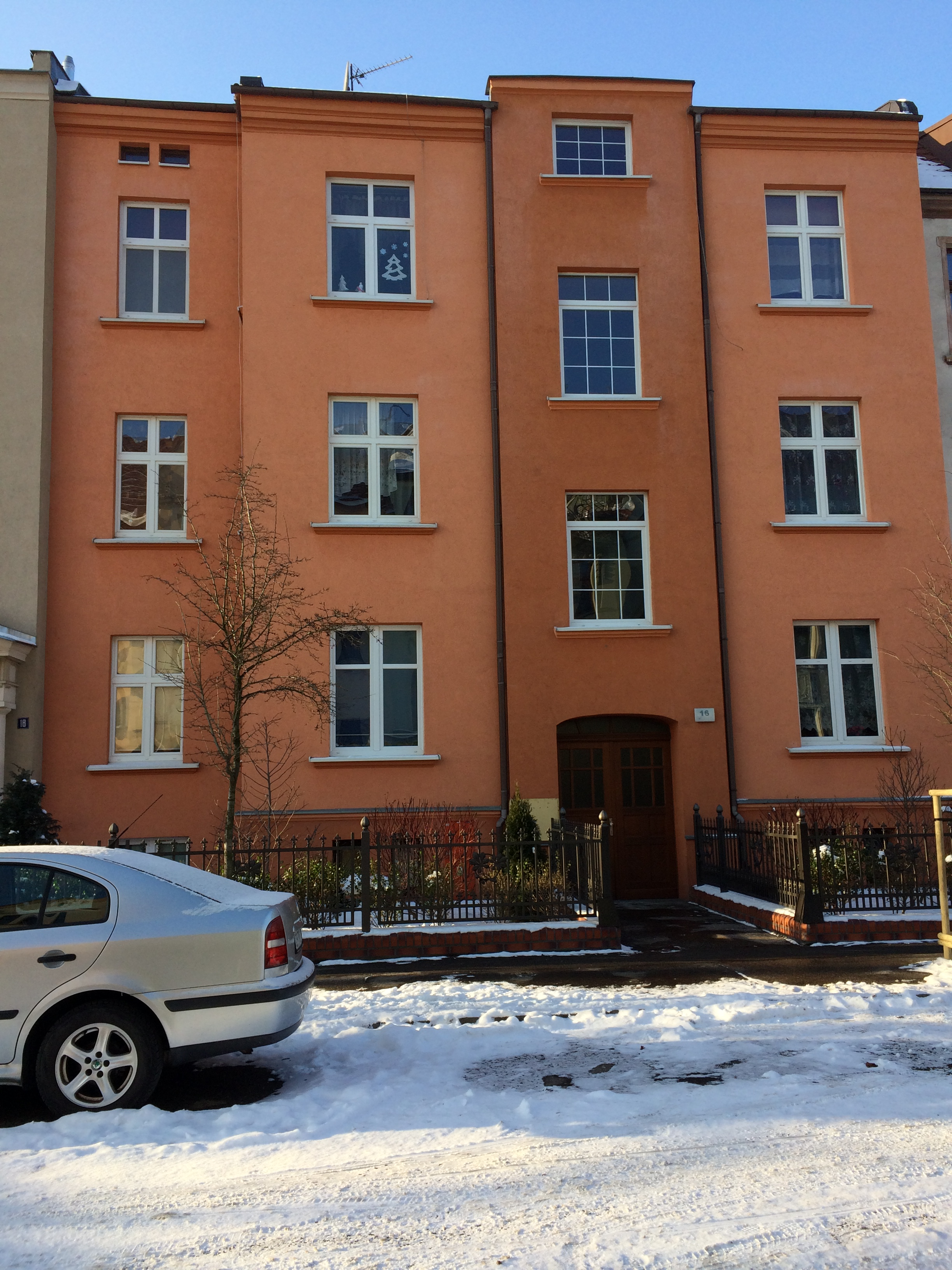
Main facade

=== Tenement at 17 ===
1906

Art Nouveau

Reinhold Krampiß, a rentier, was the first landlord of then Bollmann Straße 10. Next one was a shop assistant, Kurt ßrillwitz.

The building has a standard shape, with a middle avant-corps topped by a wrought iron balcony. The facade is highly decorated, with Art Nouveau architectural details: mainly vegetal motifs over pediment openings and women figures.

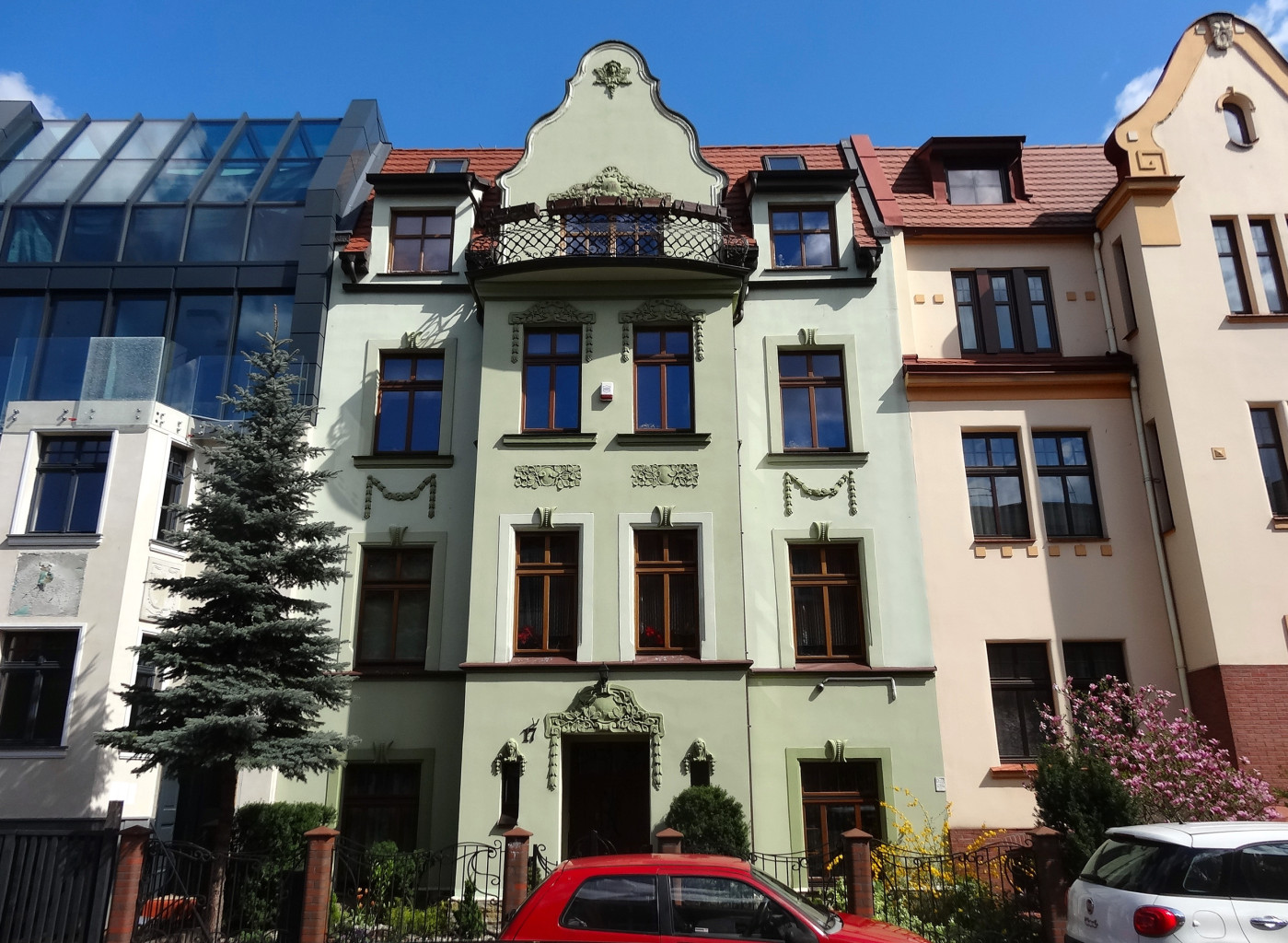
Main elevation on the street

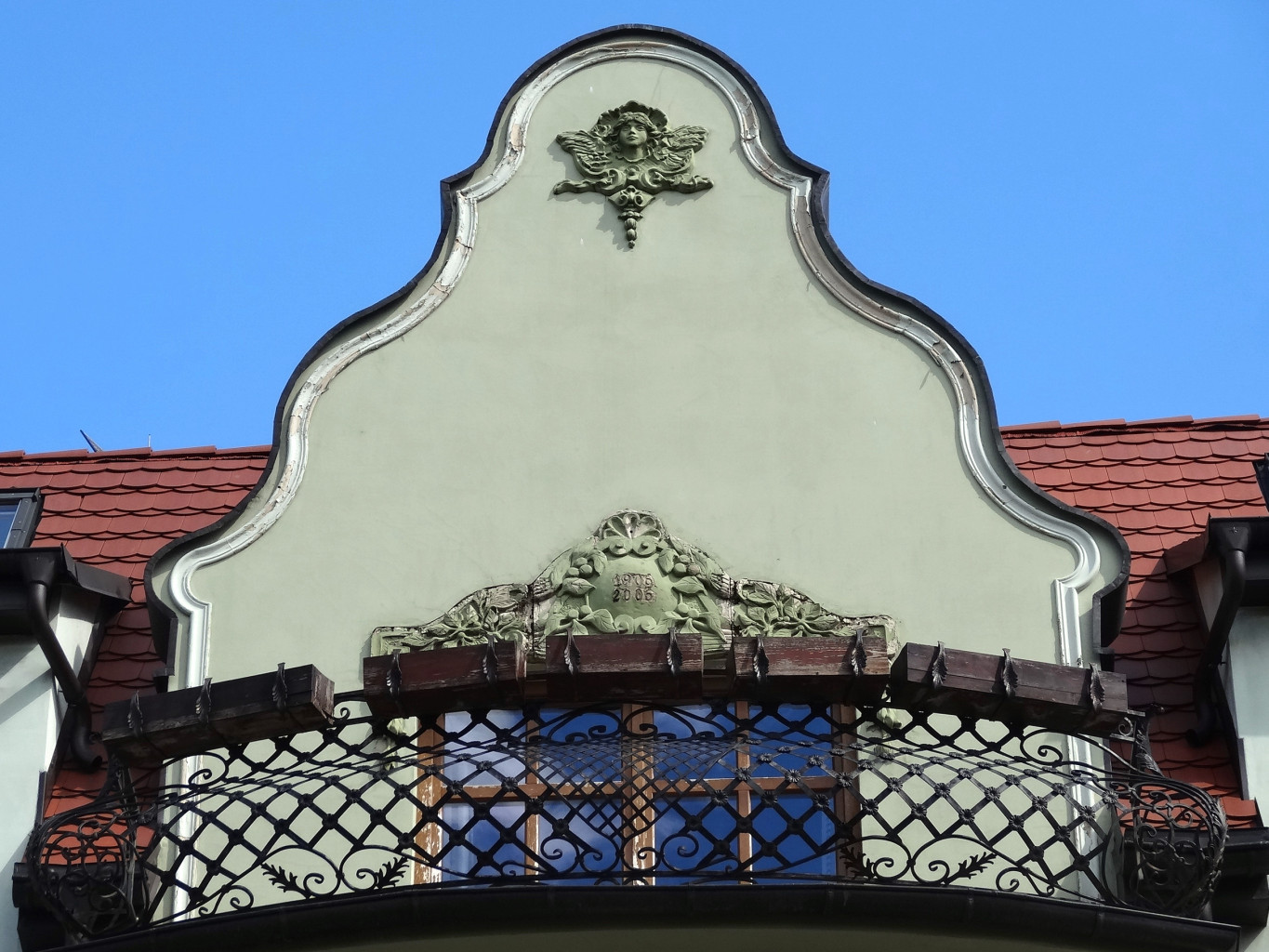
Top balcony

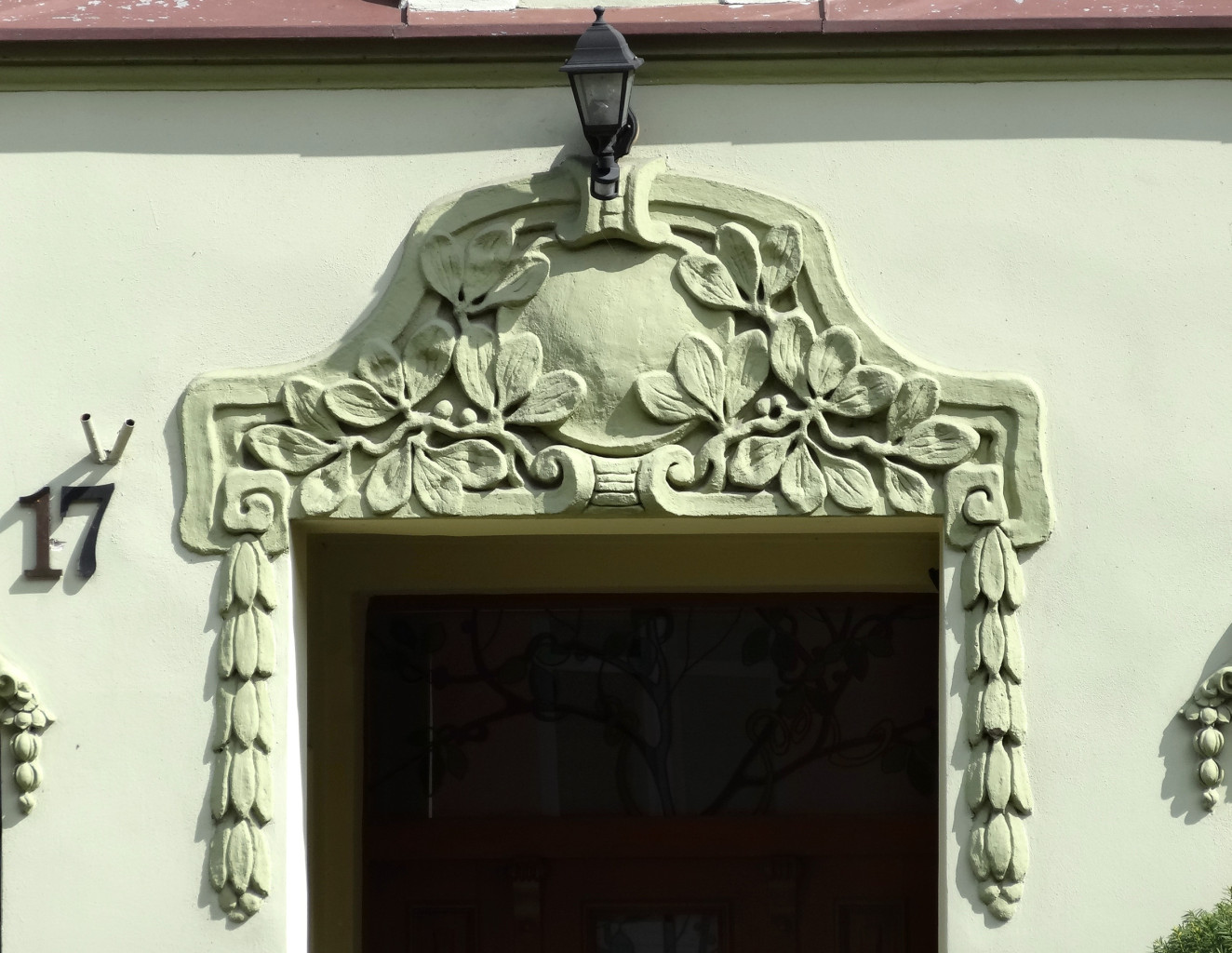
Detail of the portal

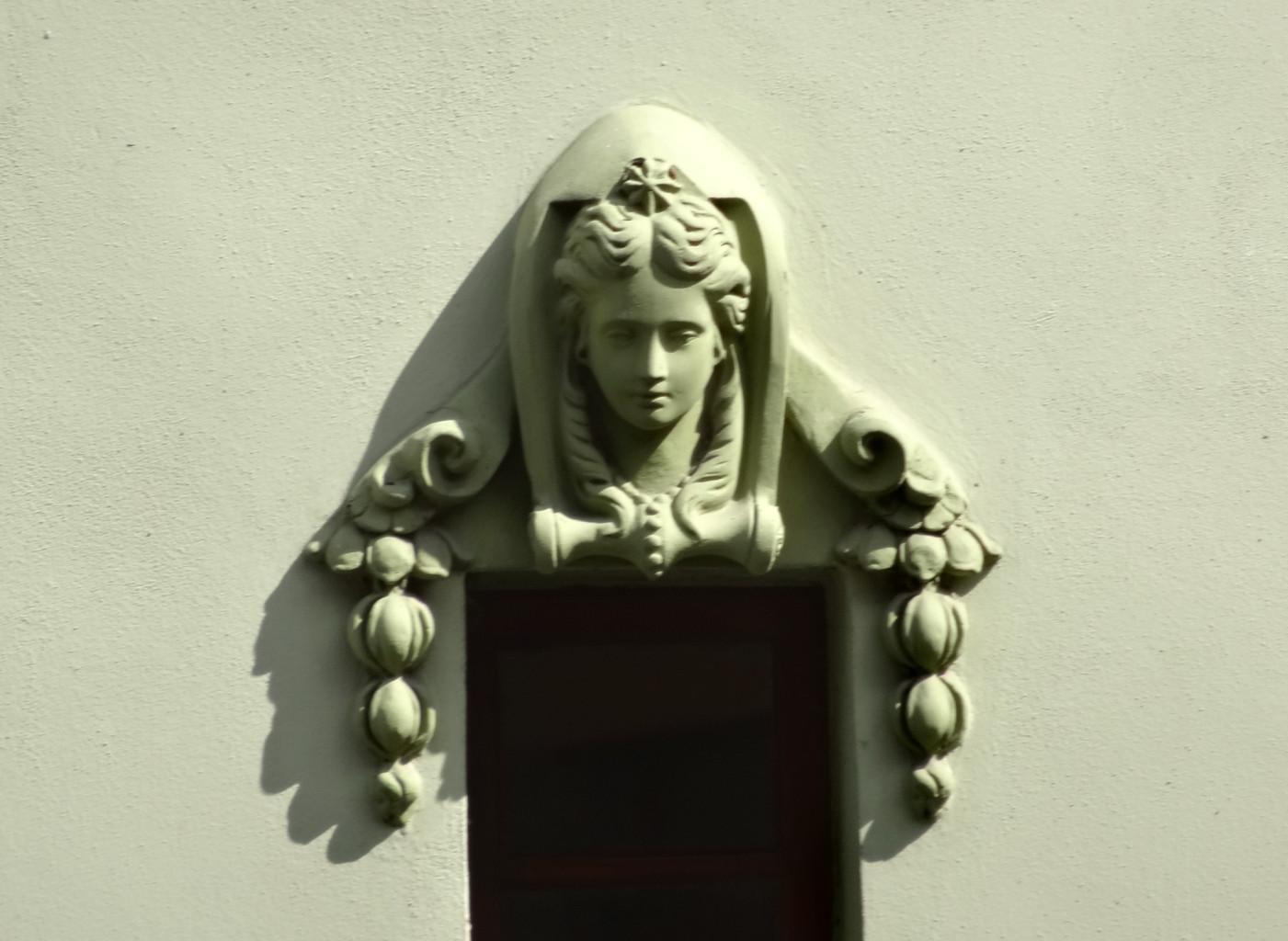
Pediment detail

=== Tenement at 18 ===
1895, by Emil Fricke

Functionalism

First landlord was Rudolf Berndt, a rentier.

The building having been re-constructed in the 1920s and today it displays a modern architectural style. One can notice the heavily decorated portal, with columns, a triangular tympanum, a large lintel and a nicely craved door with a transom light.

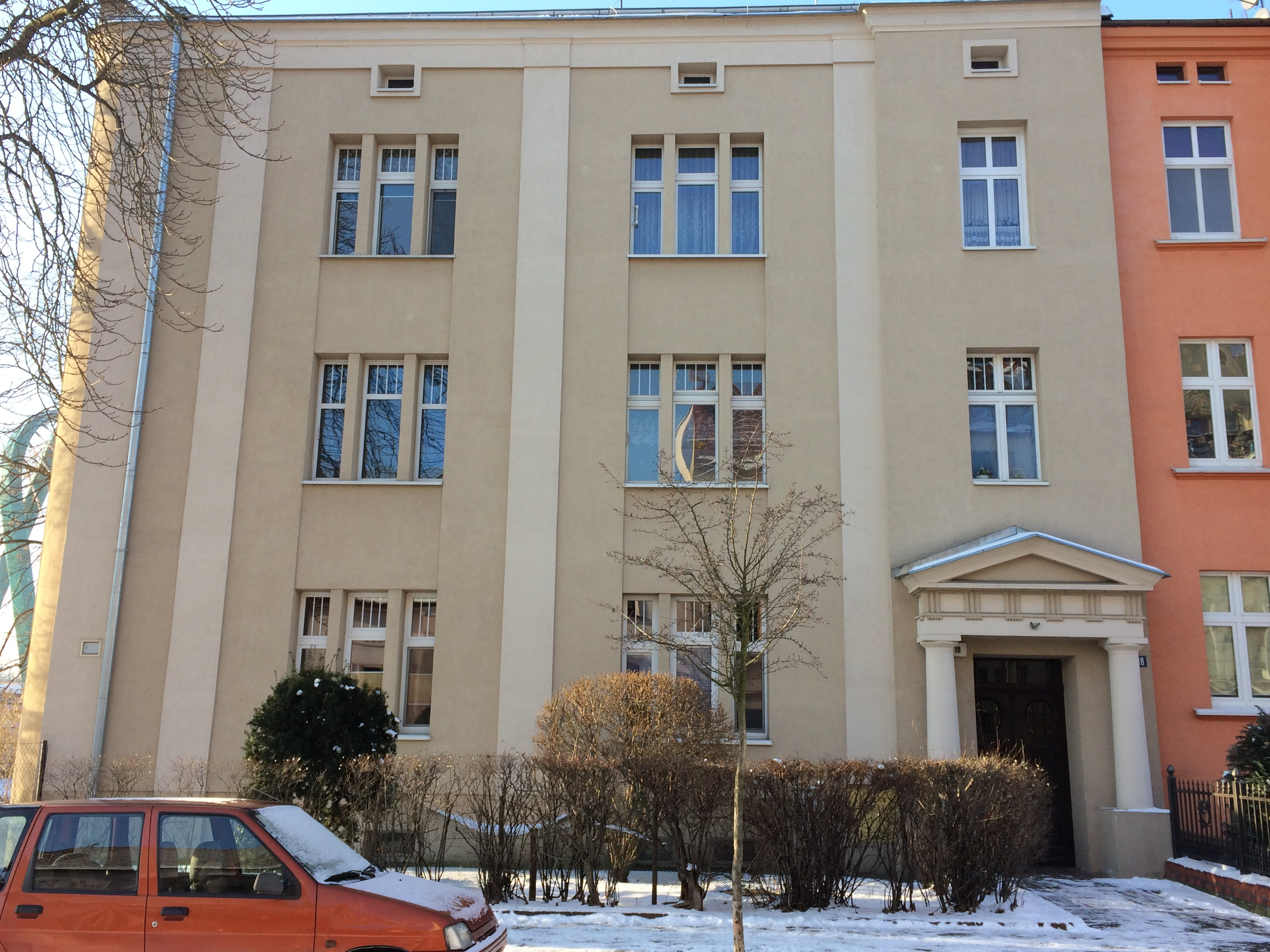
Main elevation

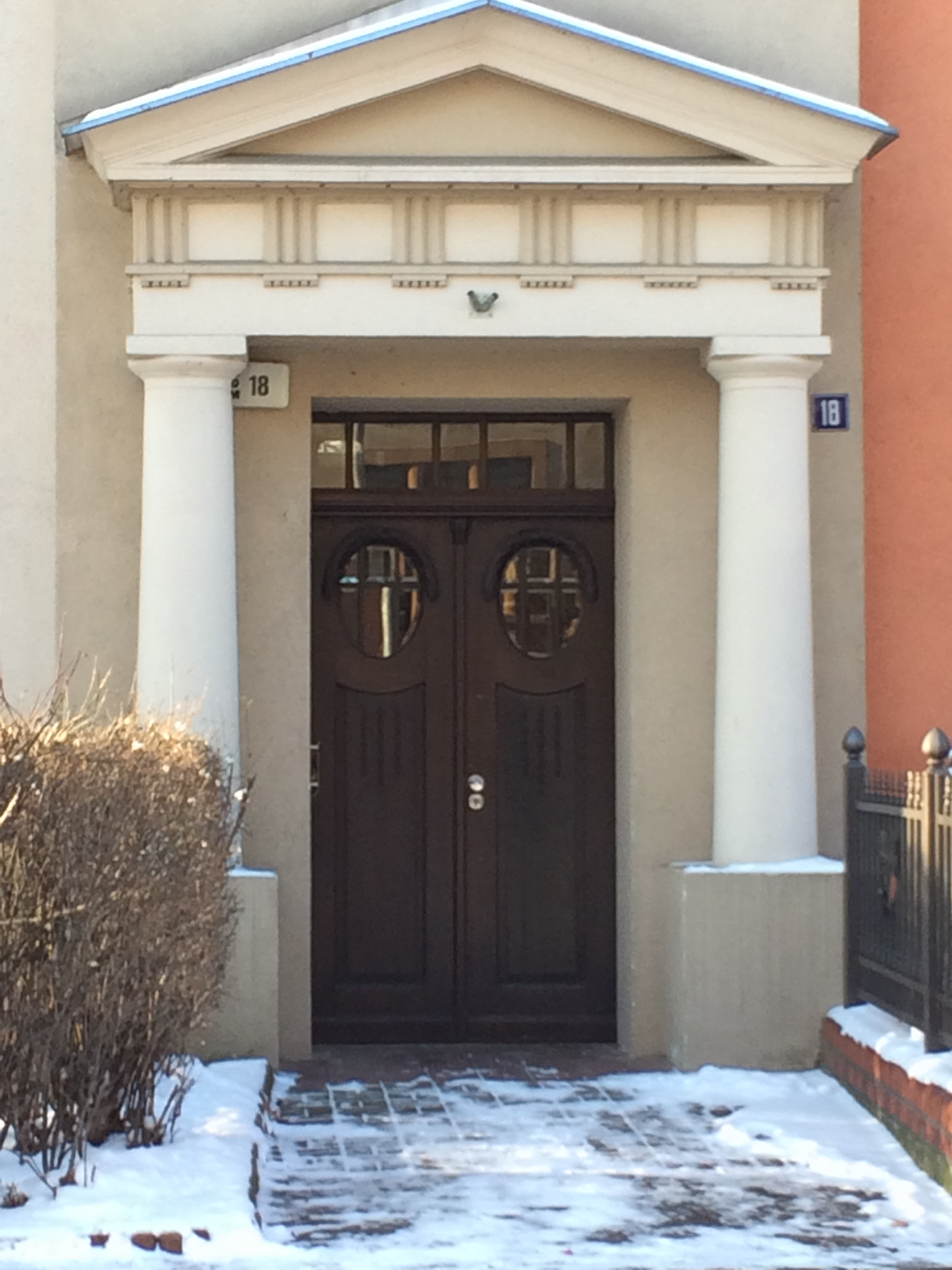
Main door

=== Tenement at 19 ===
Early 1920s

Late Art Nouveau & early Modern architecture

Although the building has been erected in the 1920s and boasts elements of this period, it also displays some late Art Nouveau details (ogee gable, lintel and portal).

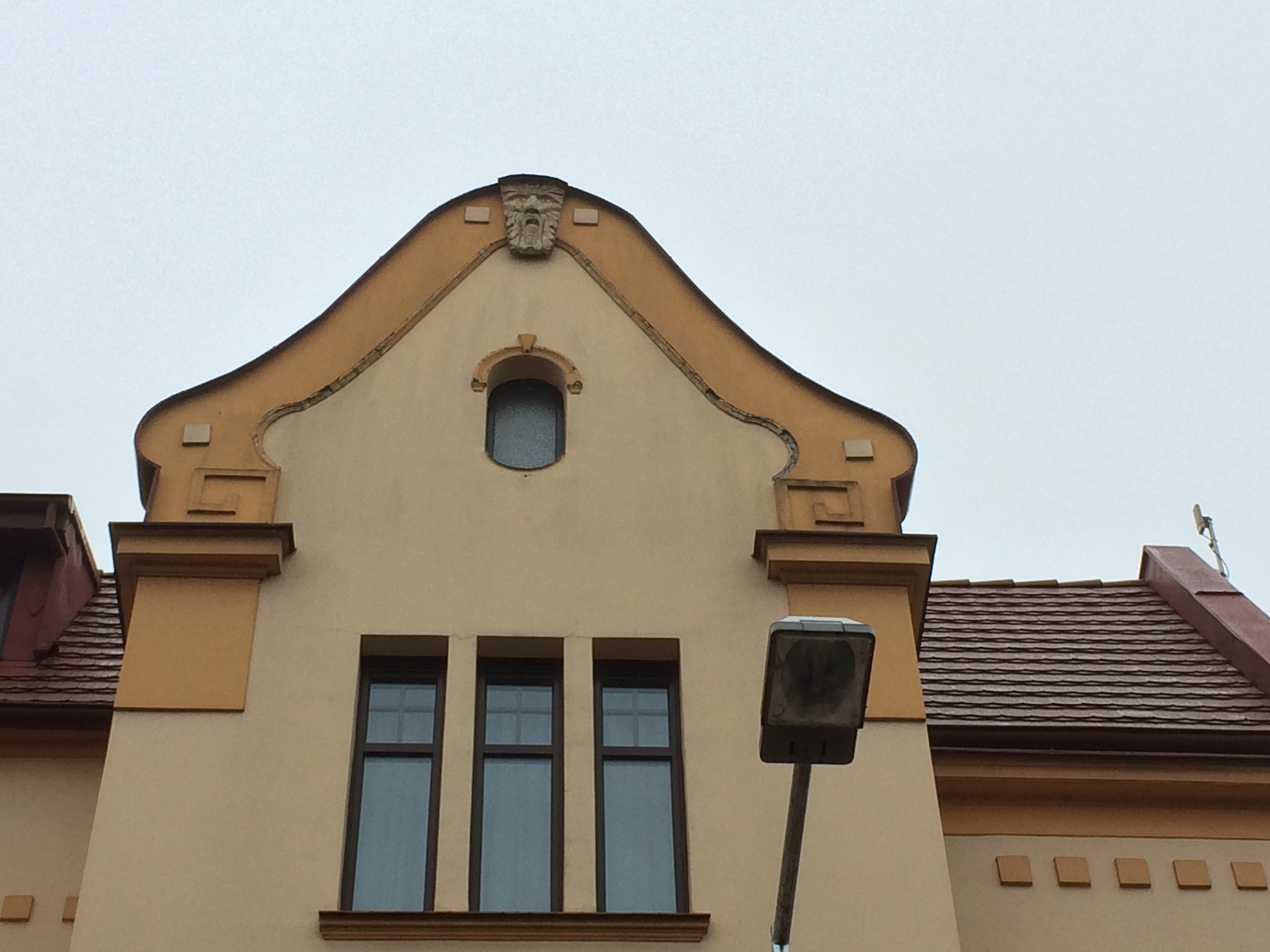
Gable decoration

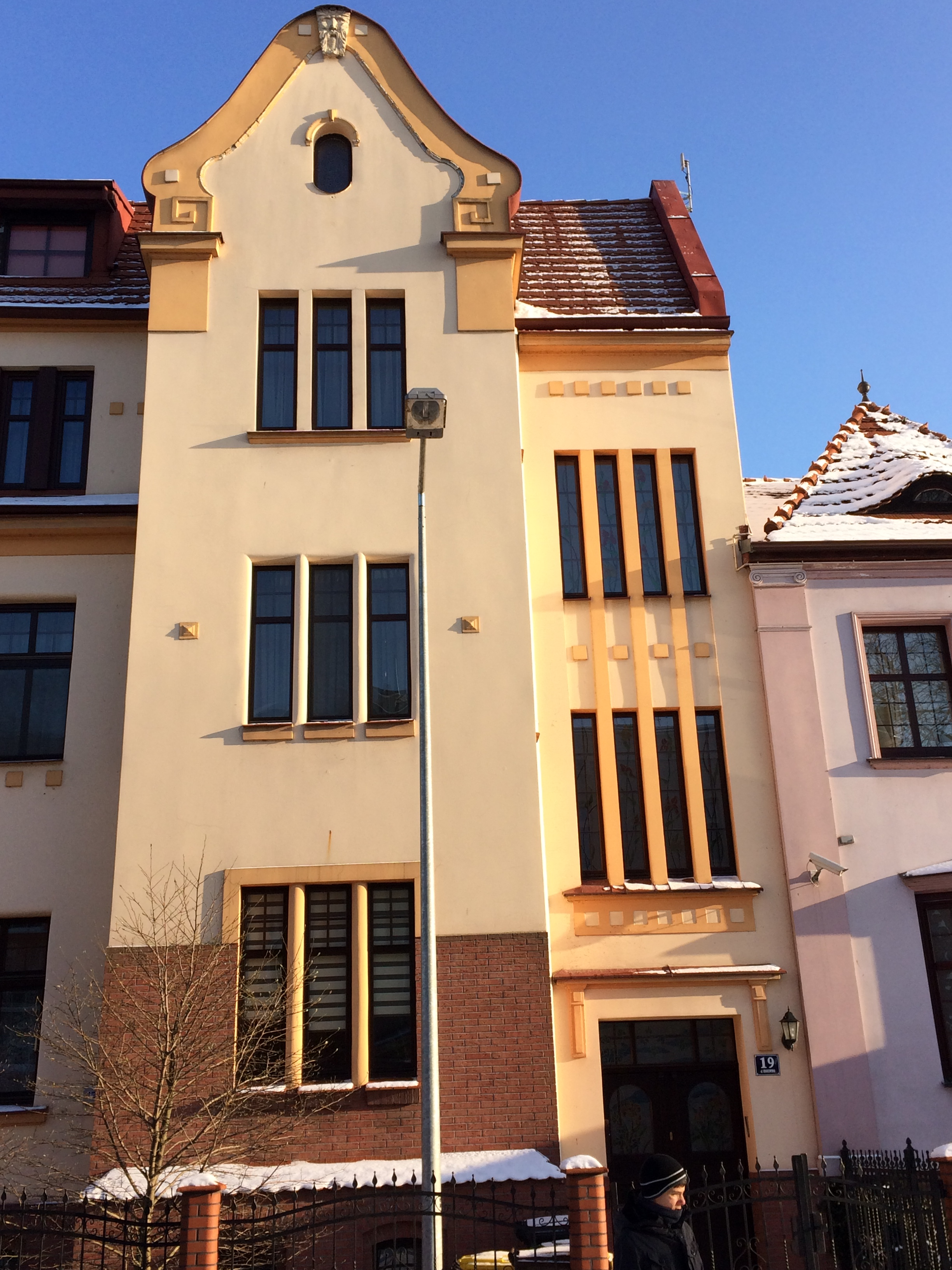
Main elevation

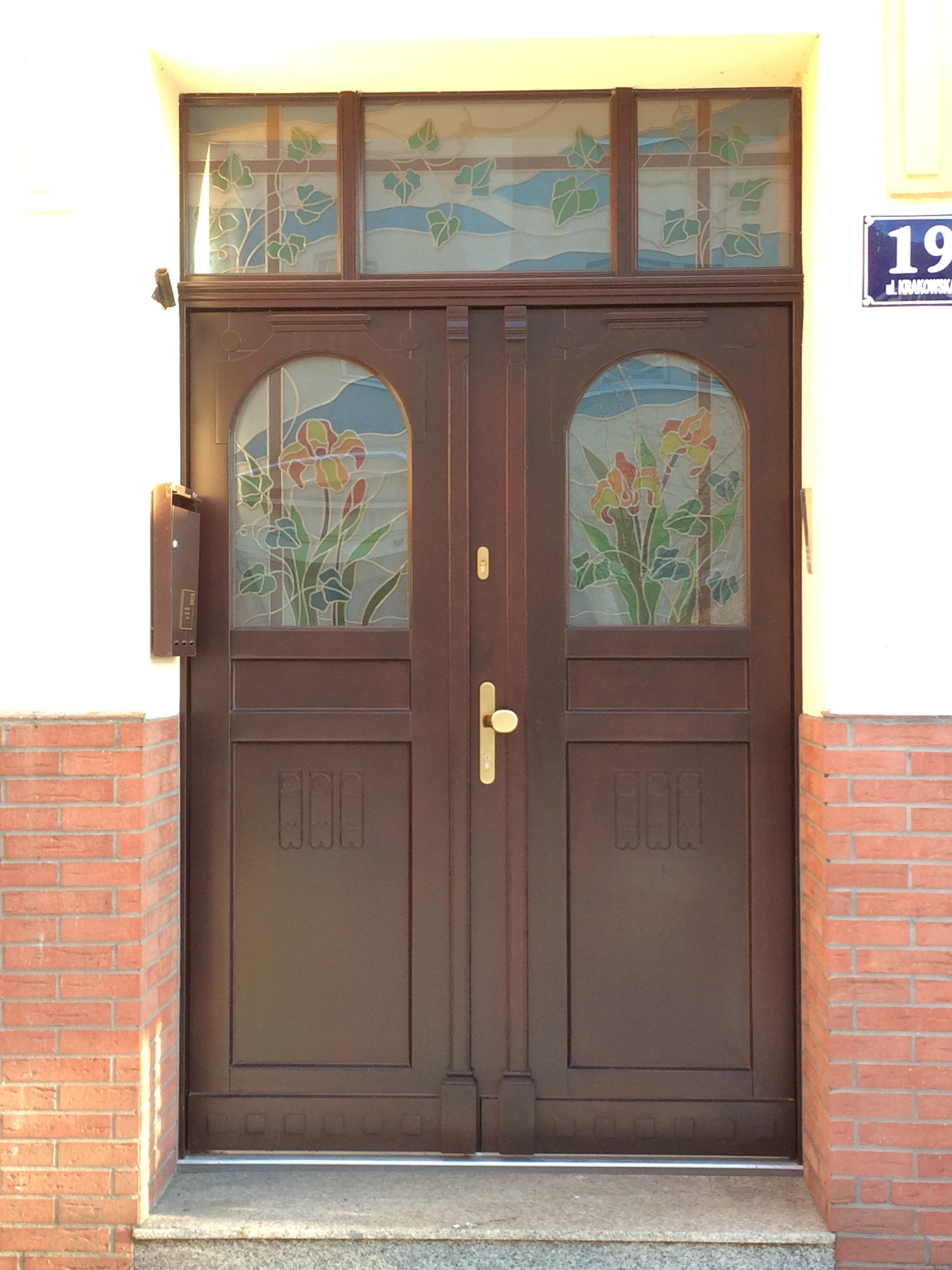
Main door

=== Villa at 21 ===
1883 (1911)

Art Nouveau

Albeit the facade of the villa boasts 1883 as foundation date, no written accessible evidence can support this fact. First recorded landlord was August Kähler, in 1911, a telegraph assistant. Following owners were mainly rentiers. A private English language and literature school name after "William Wharton", has been opened there in 1993.

Few Art Nouveau elements can still be noticed: an eyelid dormer, a slight bay window, a pair of pilasters on the facade and two finials over the roof.

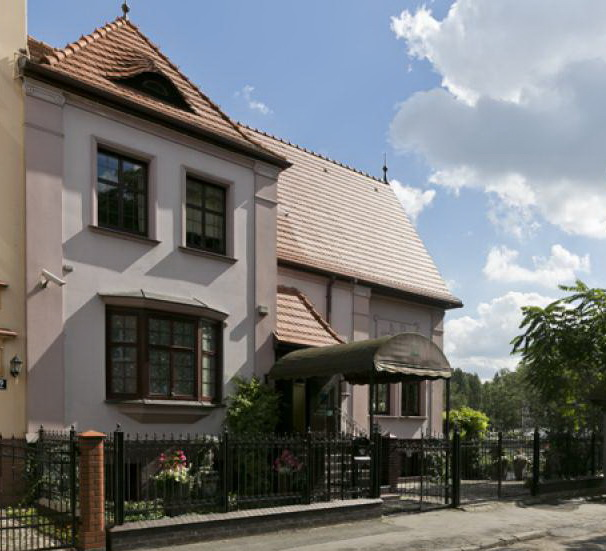
Main frontage

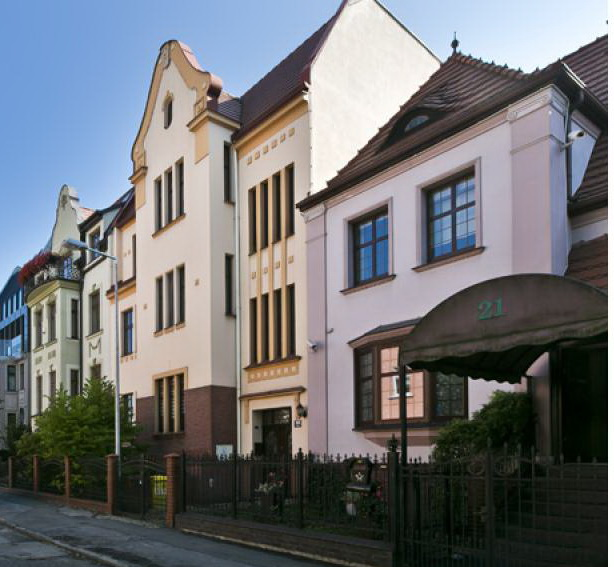
Nr.21 (right) and 19 (left)

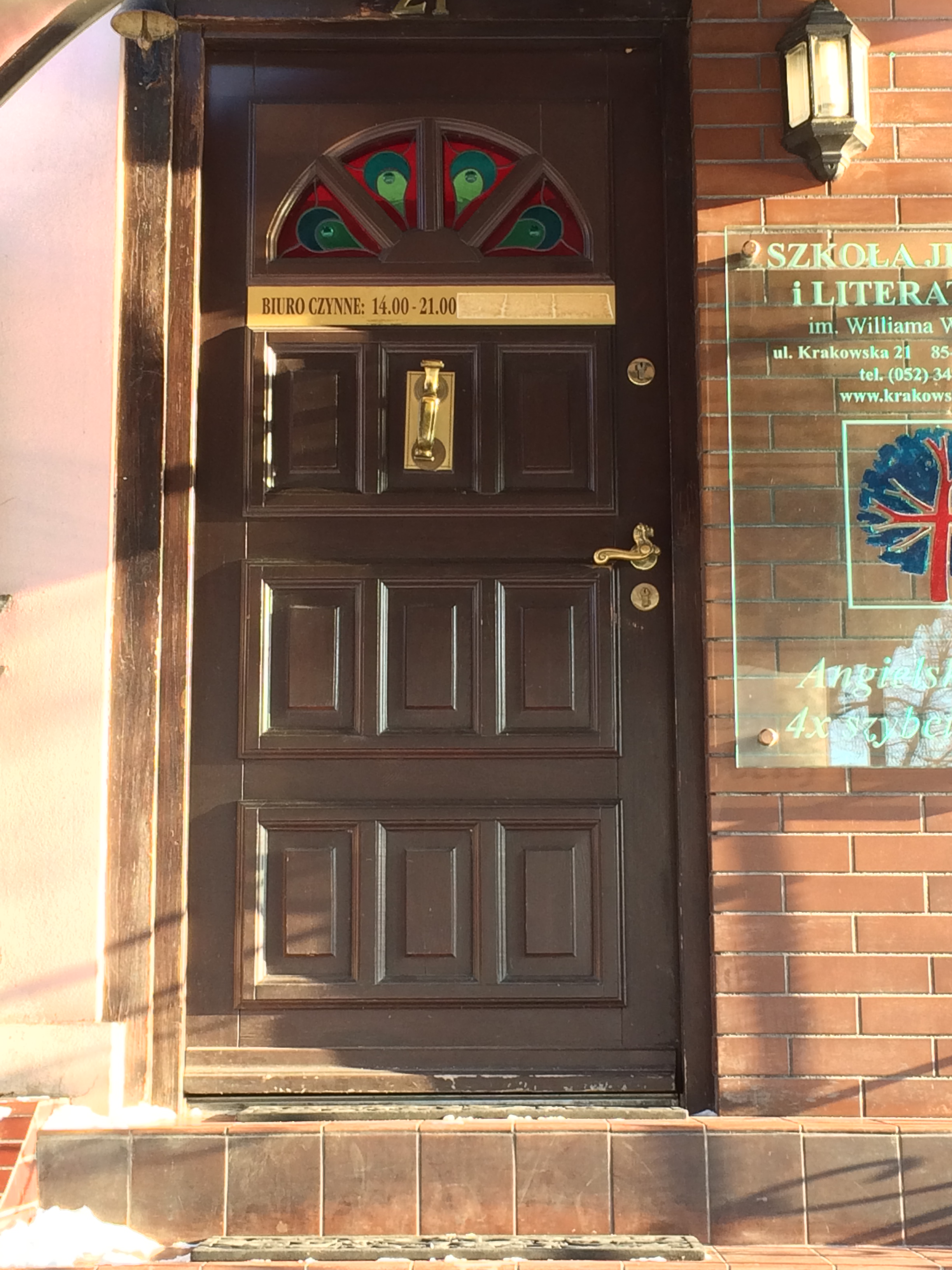
Main entry door

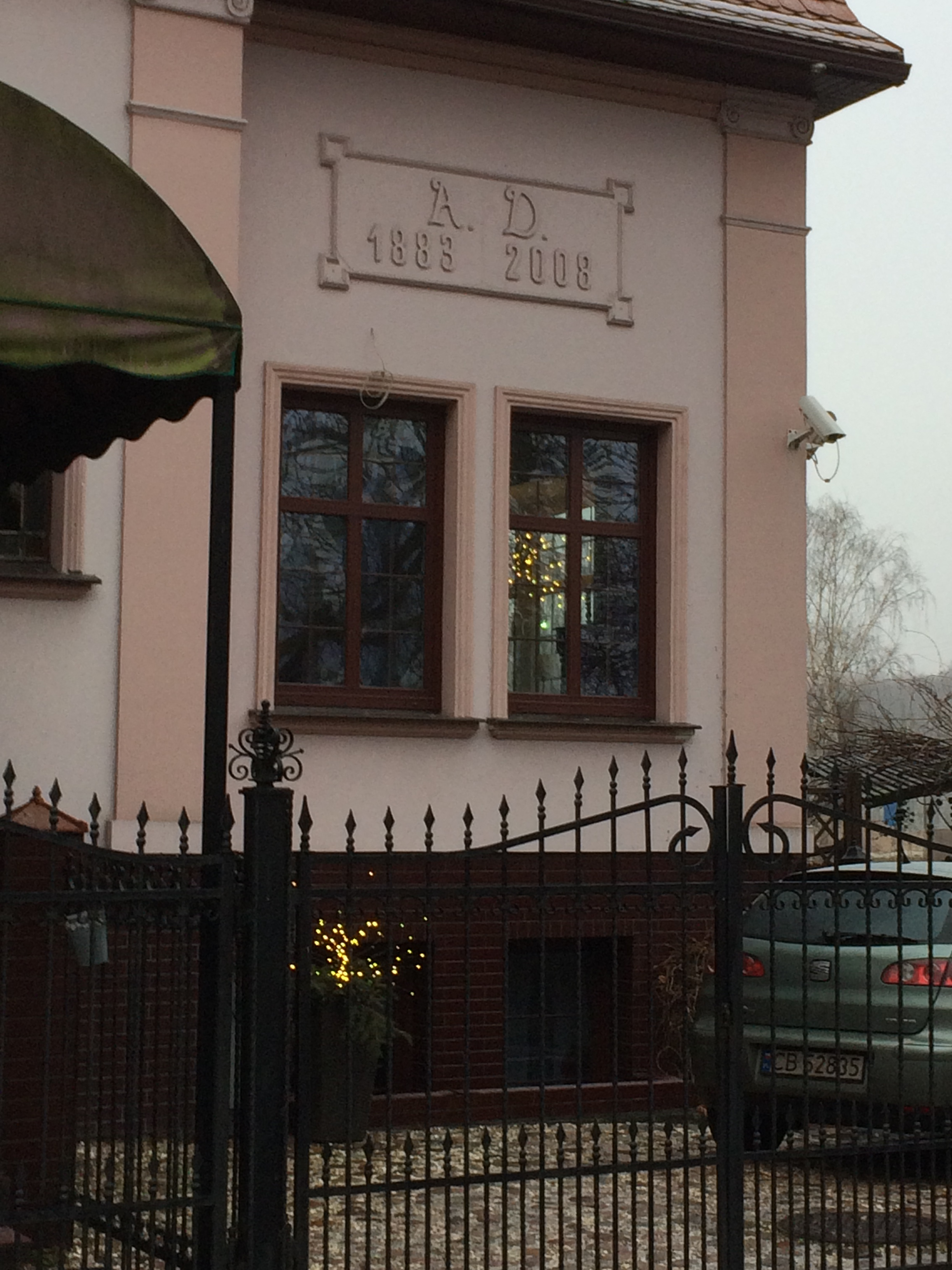
Detail of stucco

== See also ==
- Bydgoszcz Architects (1850-1970s)
