= School buildings at 52/54 Karpacka street, Bydgoszcz =

Polish school, Bydgoszcz, 1856

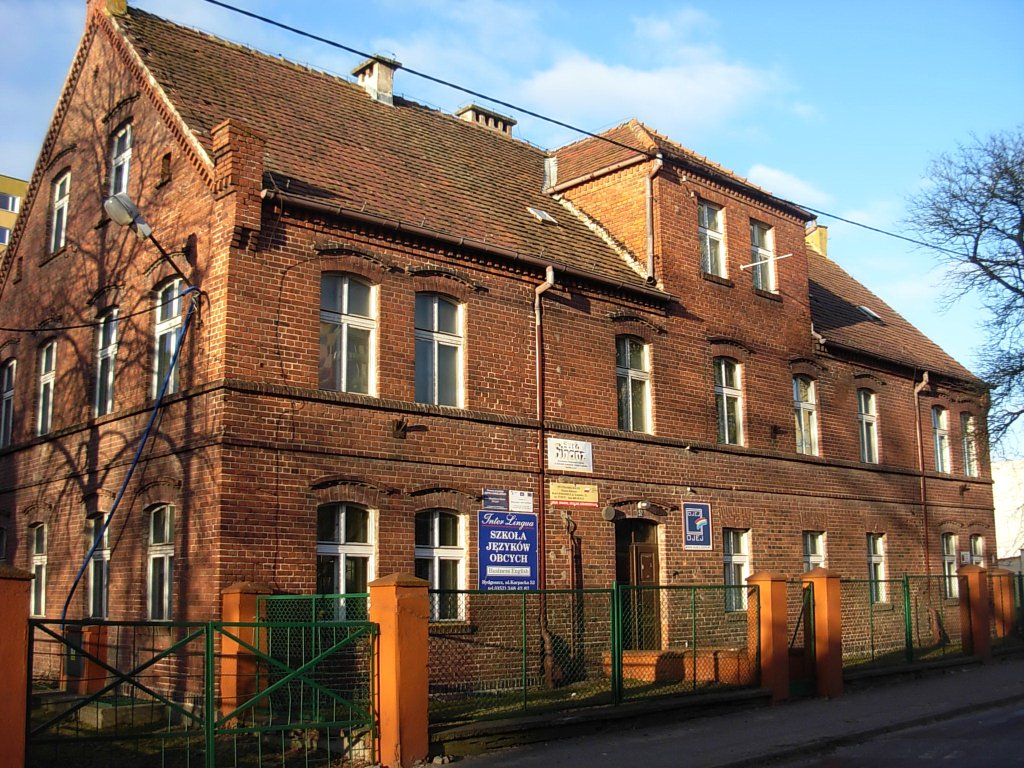
- View of the 1856 building at 54 Karpacka street

Location
- Bydgoszcz; Poland
- Coordinates: 53°06′43″N 18°00′48″E

Information
- Type: Primary school
- Established: 1856
- School district: Wzgórze Wolności district
- Language: Polish

School buildings at 52/54 Karpacka street are historic educational buildings in Bydgoszcz, which service started as a primary school in 1856.

== Location ==
Both edifices are located at 52/54 Karpacka street in the Wzgórze Wolności district. The housing estate sits at the top of the hill overlooking the Brda river valley.

== History ==
=== Prussian period ===
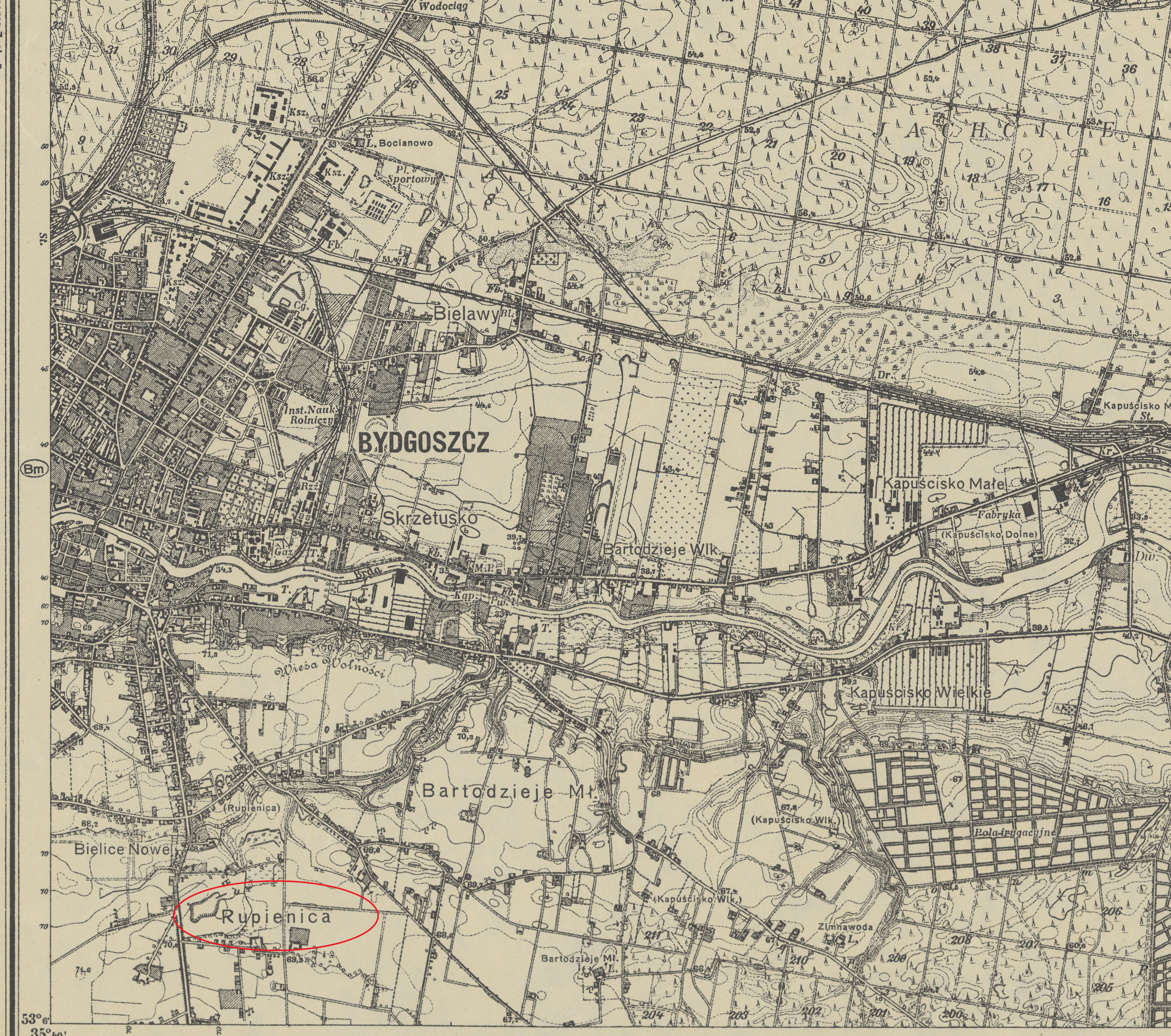
Rupienica south of Bydgoszcz (1927 map)

The area used to be part of a rural commune, the Rupienica folwark. In 1831, a fee-paying private school managed by Wilhelm operated for a while. When it closed, children from Rupienica and neighboring Glinki were sent to Evangelical or Catholic schools in the suburb village of Małe Bartodzieje.

In 1856, Rupienica council decided to build an Evangelical primary school in the village, in what was called Glinkerstraße. The building had only one classroom and housed 73 children. In 1875, during the reorganization of elementary schools, a common school for all children, regardless of their faiths, was set up there as well: it then welcomed 160 Protestant and 140 Catholic pupils. The children were divided into four classes, taught by four teachers. One classroom was located in the school building, while the three others were housed in private homes.

In 1878, the school was expanded with new wings to both sides of the building, a second door and the construction of a second floor. The project design was prepared by building inspector Queisner, and two-third of the costs were covered by the Prussian government. The building could offer four spacious classrooms and apartments for three teachers. In 1895, a fifth classroom was created and an additional teacher room was also converted into a sixth classroom.

By 1912, there were 10 classrooms, six teachers, and six classrooms. That same year, the erection of a new school building started, adjoining the first one.

=== Polish period (1920-1945) ===
In 1920, with the rebirth of the Second Polish Republic, Rupienica commune was incorporated into the territory of Bydgoszcz city: a seven-grade Polish Middle school officially opened at the school.

In 1928, the education complex was renamed Queen Jadwiga Common School No. 15 in Bydgoszcz.

Alumni of the school included:

- Father Romuald Biniak, the long-time parish priest and builder of the Church of the Holy Polish Brothers Martyrs in the Wyżyny district;
- Felicja Gwincińska, the chairwoman of the Bydgoszcz City Council from 2002 to 2006.

In October 1939, the Nazis shot Antoni Zawadzki, then longstanding school principal since 1924, in the Valley of Death mass murder action.

=== PRL period (1945-1989) ===
After the end of World War II, classes resumed at the Polish primary school in 1945. A year later, the school was changed to Primary school Number 21, but the patron name of Queen Jadwiga was dropped down by the Soviet-aligned Polish authorities.

Following the increasing number of pupils living in the expanding housing estate on Wzgórze Wolności, a new school building had to be built. Works began in the 1970s, further north in the street, at 30 Karpacka Street. This new complex opened in 1982: it welcomed 1,343 children supervised by 73 teachers. At that time, while classes were discontinued in the 1856-school, they continued in the 1912-building until 1996.

The school operated only under a number (Nr. 21) until a plebiscite elected a new patron in June 1988: Janusz Korczak.

=== Recent period (since 1989) ===
Following 2016 reform by PiS ruling party, changes to Polish education system were gradually introduced: from 2017-2018, middle schools were scheduled to be disbanded, primary schools to be extended to eight years and upper secondary schools to be given one year more, as it was before 1999. This change put an end to the existence of both buildings as educational institutions.

On the one hand, the 1856-edifice had its rooms rented to various craft workshops and institutions. Eventually, the Museum of photography of Bydgoszcz, a city were the Photochemical Factory "Foton" once thrived, moved there in 2020.

On the other hand, the 1912-school housed from 2005 to 2017 the private Higher School of Health Sciences (Wyższa Szkoła Nauk o Zdrowiu w Bydgoszczy). In 2022, the management of the house was transferred to the District Office in order to shelter the District Family Support Center and a branch of the Pedagogical and Psychological Counseling Center.

In 1999, in accordance with the school reform act, Janusz Korczak Elementary School No. 21 ceased to exist on 1 September 2005. In order to keep the Polish interwar tradition, the patronage of Queen Jadwiga was attributed on 29 May 2009, to the Middle School Nr. 20 which new facilities are located at 30 Karpacka street.

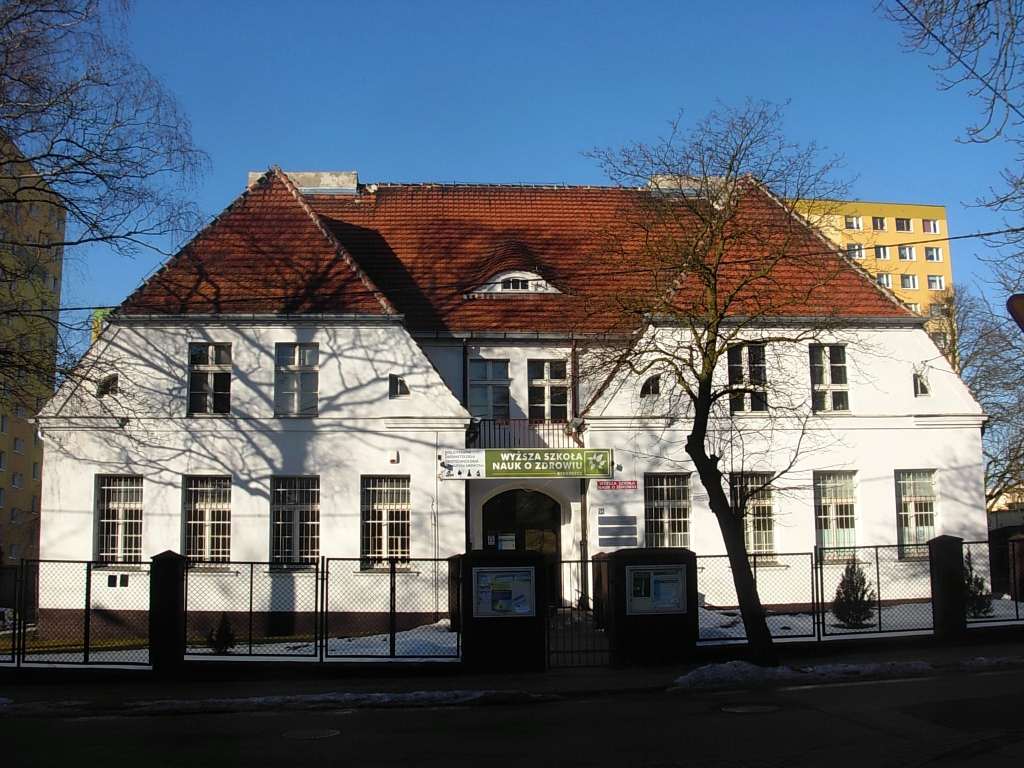
School building at 54 Karpacka street (1912)

== Architecture ==
The ancient elementary school complex on Karpacka Street consists of two buildings:

- the older one, built in 1856, had been expanded in 1878 and in 1895 (at Nr. 52). It is a two-story brick house and displays a hip roof;
- the newer one, dating from 1912 (at Nr. 54), is plastered and presents two avant-corps. It is also topped by a hip roof with an eyelid dormer.

Both buildings were built in the historicist style.

== See also ==
- Bydgoszcz
- Institutes of Agriculture, Bydgoszcz
- Copernicanum
- Main building of Bydgoszcz Music Academy
- Mechanical School No. 1, Bydgoszcz
- War College Building, Bydgoszcz

== Bibliography ==
- W.G. (1971). Gawęda o szkołach bydgoskich. Kalendarz Bydgoski [Schools tale about Bydgoszcz. Bydgoszcz Calendar] (in Polish). Bydgoszcz: Towarzystwo Miłośników Miasta Bydgoszczy. pp. 151–163.
