= Freedom Hill, Bydgoszcz =

District of Bydgoszcz, Poland

Freedom Hill Wzgórze Wolności
- District of Bydgoszcz
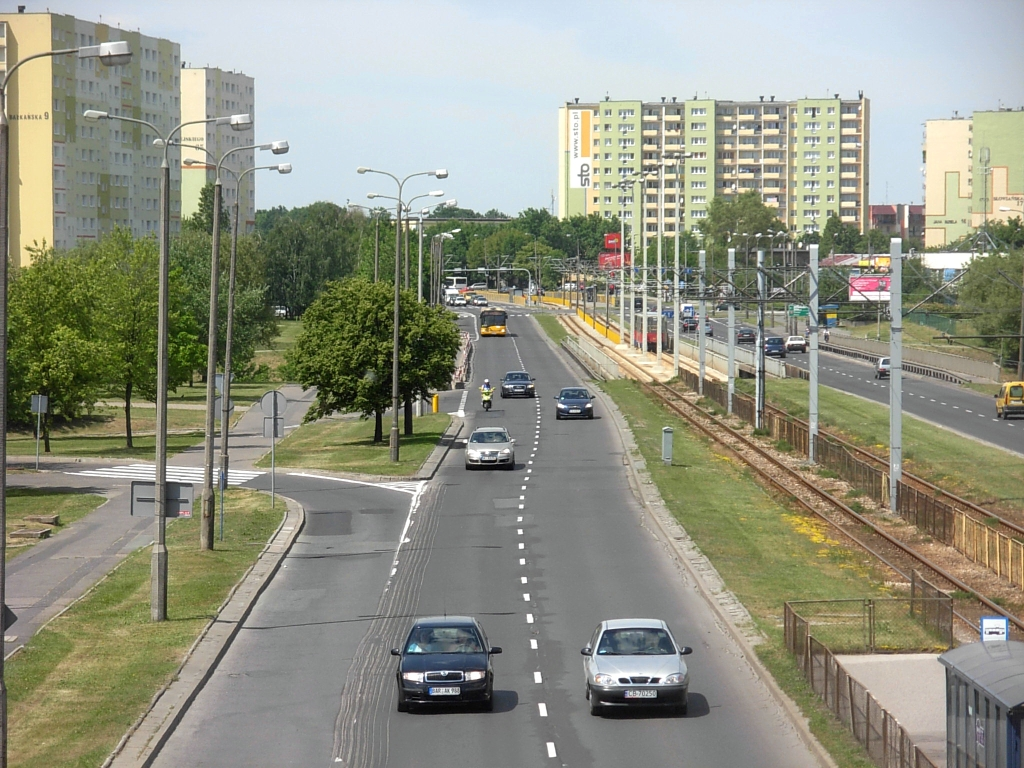
- Freedom Hill district in the area of Wojska Polskiego Avenue

- Coat of arms

- Location within Kuyavian-Pomeranian Voivodeship
- Coordinates: 53°6′51.94″N 18°1′11.08″E
- Country: Poland
- City: Bydgoszcz
- Voivodeship: Kuyavian–Pomeranian Voivodeship
- In the borders of Bydgoszcz: April 1, 1920

Government
  - Leader: Zdzisław Tylicki

Area
  - Total: 1.18 km^{2} (0.46 sq mi)

Population
  - Total: 11,430
- Postal code: from 85-162 to 85-168, 85-171, 85-172

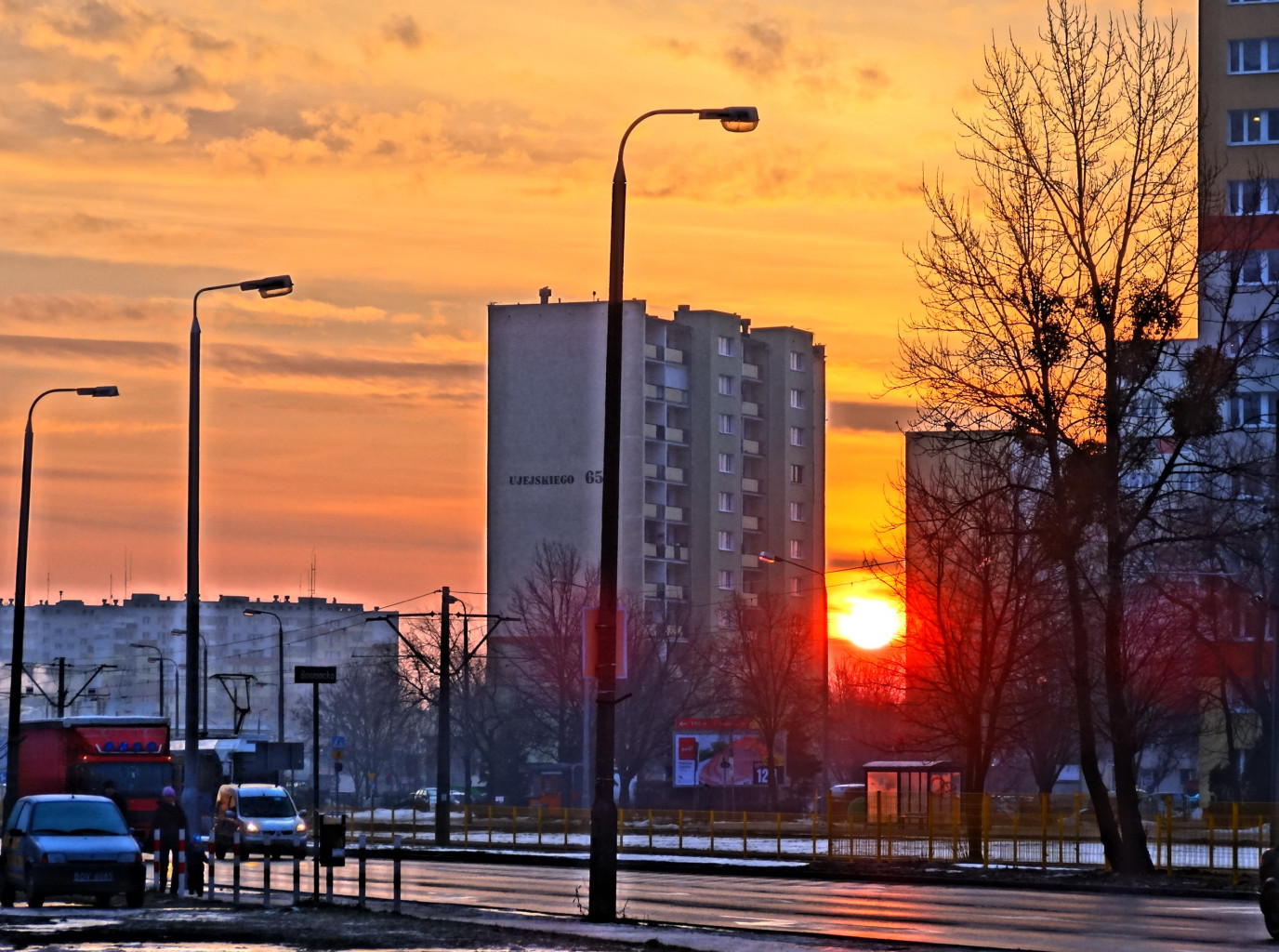
Sunrise in the district

Freedom Hill (Polish: Wzgórze Wolności) is an urban unit (district) in the city of Bydgoszcz, located in its central-southern part.

== Location ==
Freedom Hill is located in the southern part of the city and is one of the districts on Bydgoszcz’s so-called Upper Terrace. It borders Babia Wieś to the north, Wyżyny to the east, Glinki to the south, and Bielice and Szwederowo to the west.

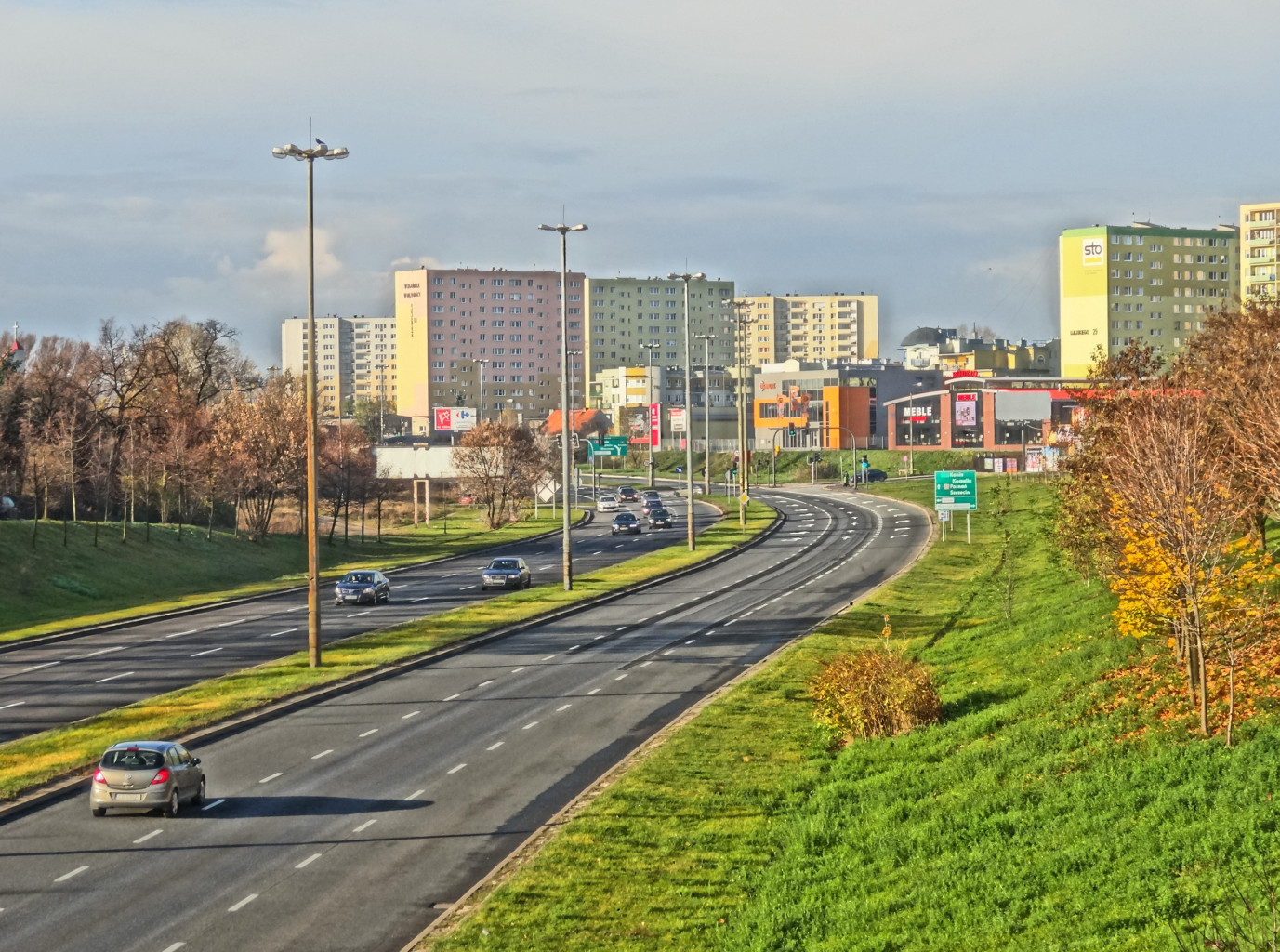
View from John Paul II Avenue

From a physical and geographical perspective, the district lies within the Toruń-Eberswalde Urstromtal macroregion and the Toruń Basin mesoregion, in the Bydgoszcz City microregion, situated on terrace ten at an elevation of between 68 and 71 meters above sea level. The northern edge of the district is defined by the Bydgoszcz Escarpment, with a relative height of about 27 meters, shaped by a network of small ravines and erosional indentations. Similarly, the western and eastern edges of Freedom Hill are natural boundaries formed by ravines through which major transportation routes, such as Kujawska Street and John Paul II Avenue, have been constructed.

Historically, the current urban unit includes areas incorporated into the city before 1875, such as Probostwo, which covered 20 hectares; the three-hectare area surrounding Bismarck Tower, annexed in 1910; the northern part of Rupienica, added in 1920; and the western part of Bartodzieje Małe, also incorporated in 1920.

== Characteristics ==
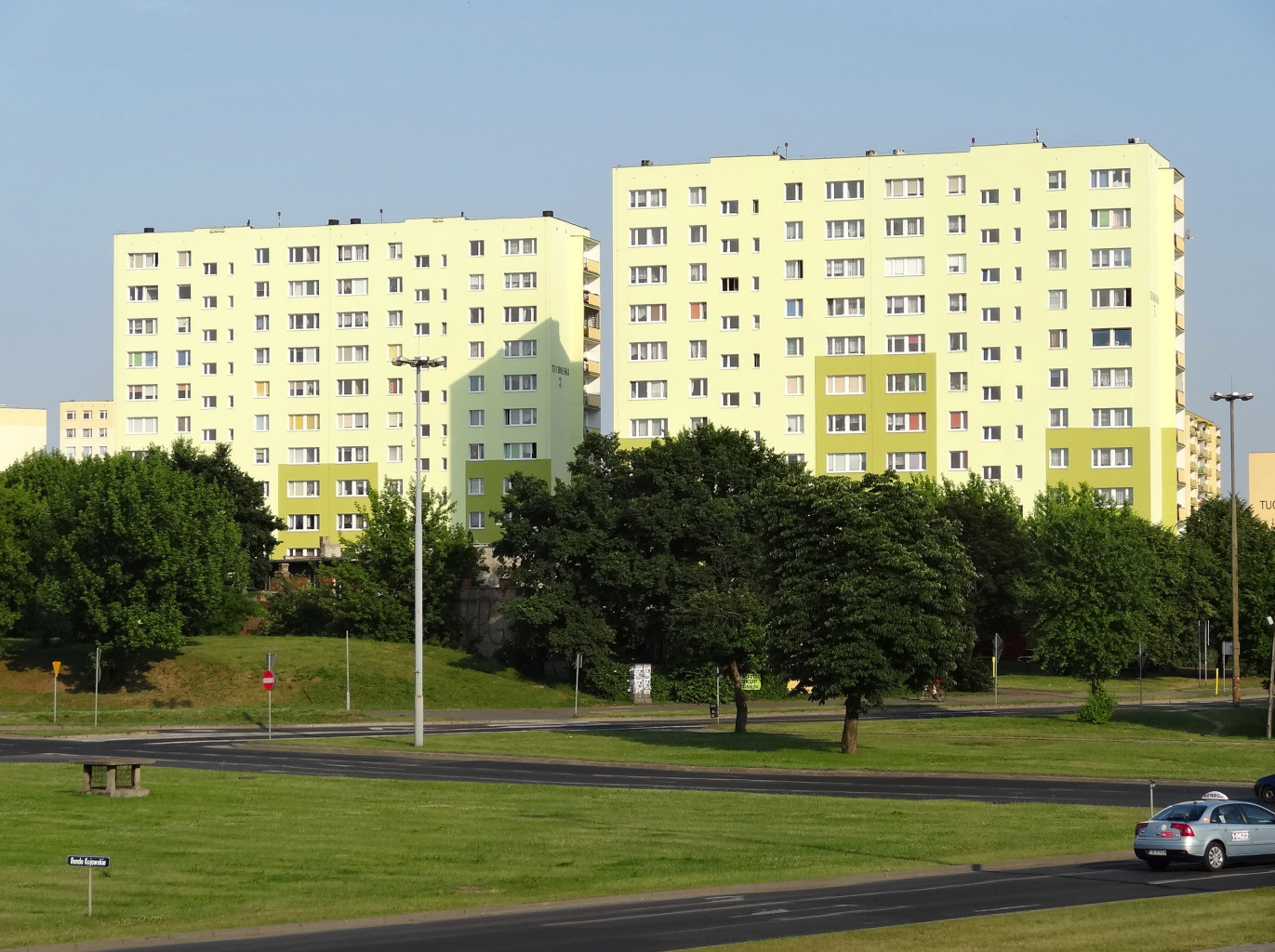
Twelve-story blocks

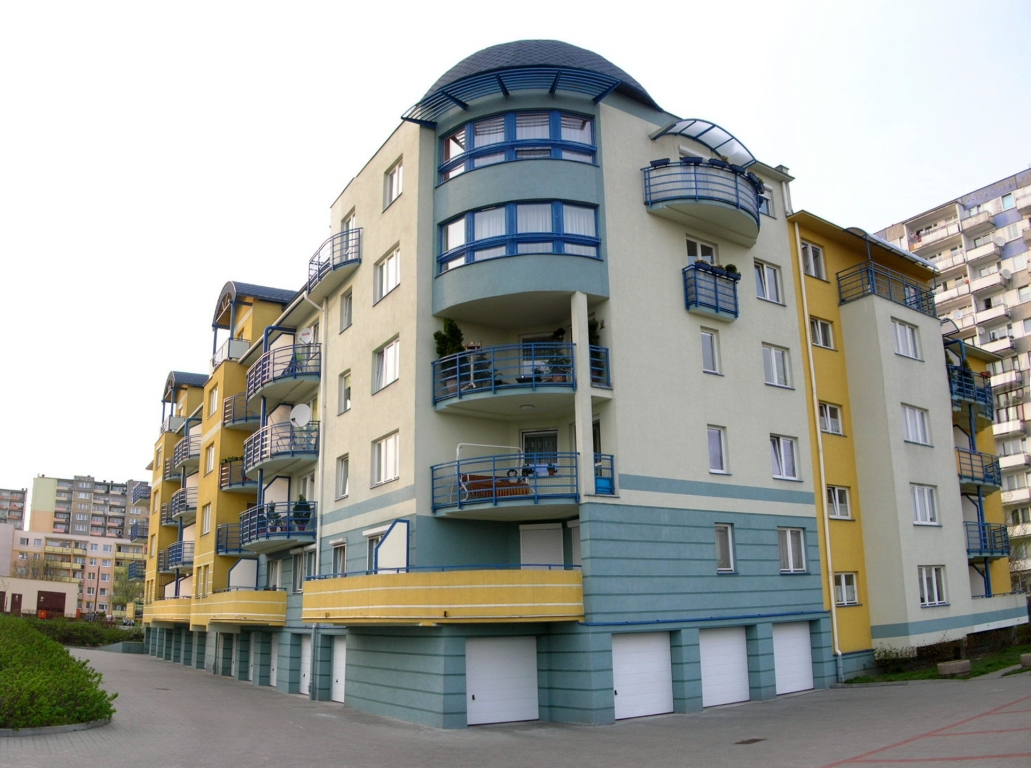
New buildings

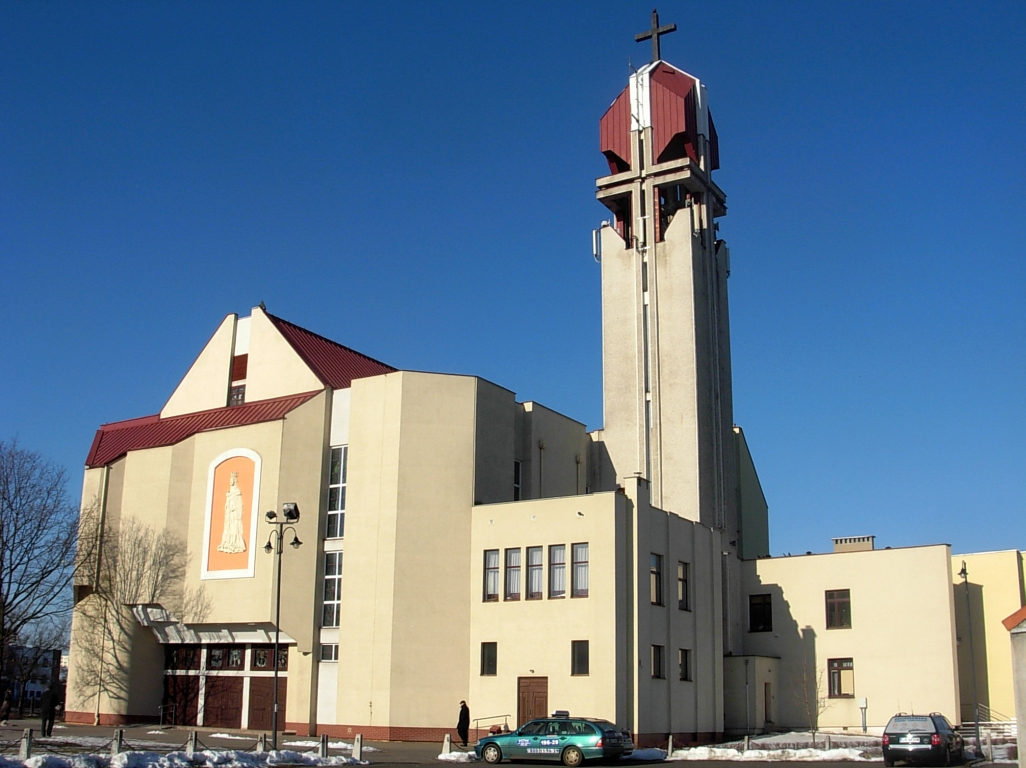
St. Hedwig the Queen Parish

Most of Freedom Hill consists of a housing estate of multi-family blocks built in the 1980s, though the accompanying infrastructure is underdeveloped. The area is dominated by multi-family buildings, with a significant presence of twelve-story blocks. Among Bydgoszcz’s districts, Freedom Hill stands out for its substantial proportion of high-rise buildings. Along several streets, there is single-family housing, some of which dates back to the Prussian partition and the interwar period.

The neighborhood is intersected by county roads, including Ujejskiego Street and Wojska Polskiego Avenue, the latter forming part of the main thoroughfare for Bydgoszcz's Upper Terrace. Major national roads border the area: national road 5 follows John Paul II Avenue and national road 25 runs along Kujawska Street.

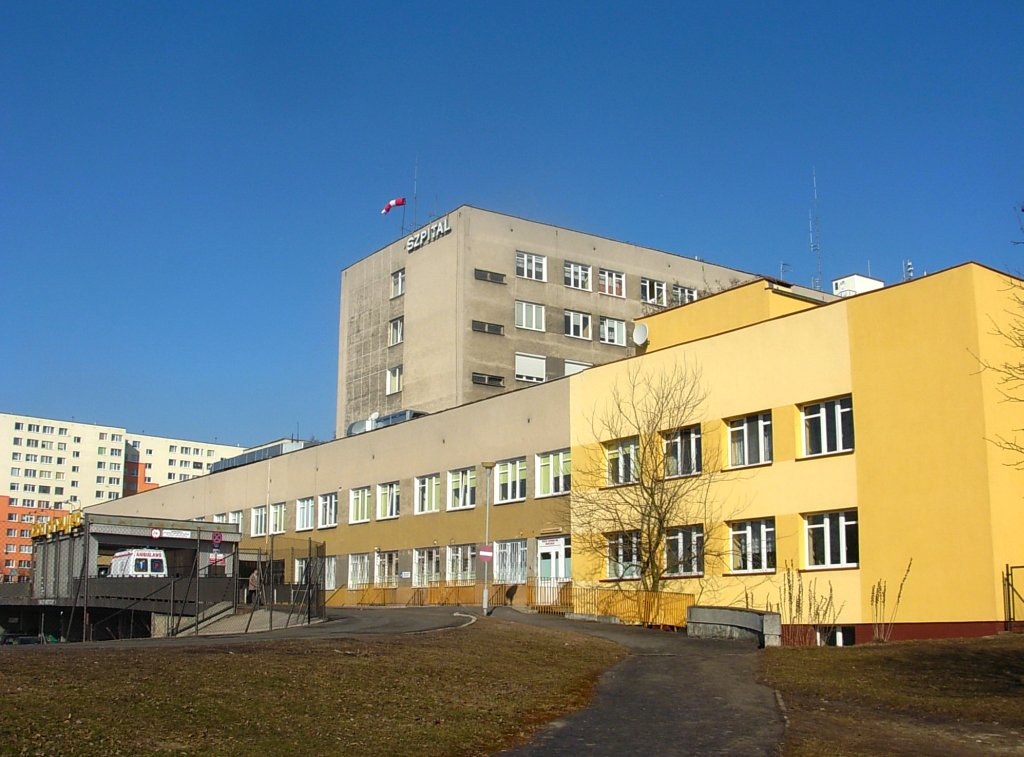
Jan Biziel University Hospital No. 2

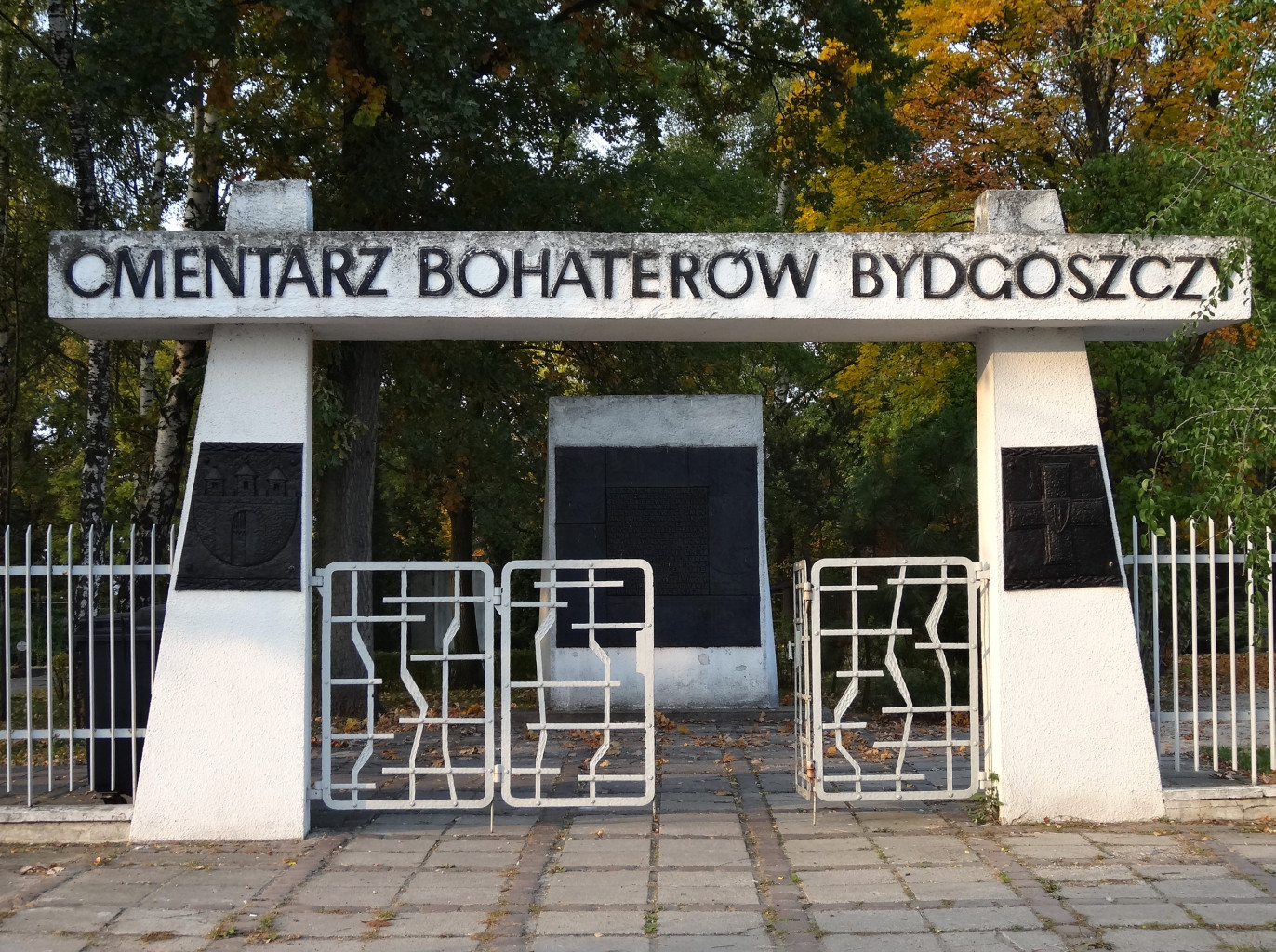
Bydgoszcz Martyrs Cemetery

The neighborhood’s infrastructure includes three kindergartens (two of which are private), a primary school, a middle school, a Roman Catholic church, the Bydgoszcz Martyrs Cemetery, Jan Biziel University Hospital No. 2, and the Higher School of Health Sciences. The regional office of TVP3 Bydgoszcz is located at the northwestern edge of the district, while the Zielone Arkady shopping gallery is on the site of the former Ortis plant.

Development projects included in the "Development Plan for Bydgoszcz for 2009–2014" that concern Freedom Hill include the construction of the University Route with a bridge and access roads, the expansion of the municipal transport network near Bernardyński Roundabout with the construction of a tram line along Kujawska Street, and the revitalization of the Freedom Hill Park.

Future development plans for Freedom Hill, based on strategic documents, involve constructing new residential buildings of moderate density near Wojska Polskiego Avenue, enhancing residential areas with complementary functions, and designating areas near Tucholska and Ujejski streets for a multi-level parking facility.

=== Name ===
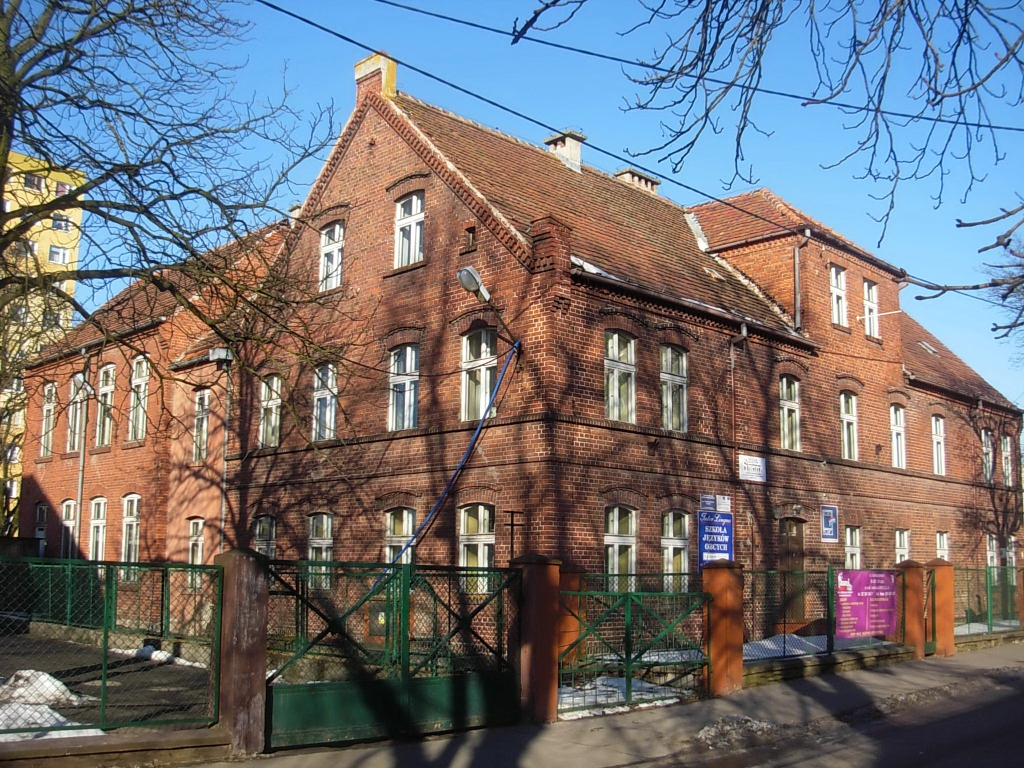
Building of the former school for Rupienica

The predecessor of Freedom Hill was the Rupienica farm, located on the southern outskirts of the district. The name likely derives from rupi, meaning troubles, and also referred to the larvae of the warble fly. The word rupi historically meant to bite, as in rupi mnie – it bites me. The name Freedom Hill itself originates from the hill near the current General Stanisław Grzmot-Skotnicki Street and Toruńska Street. In 1913, the Germans built the Bismarck Tower at this location, and the hill was called Bismarkshöhe. In 1920, it was renamed Freedom Hill, and the tower was destroyed in 1928. Since 1946, this area has hosted the Bydgoszcz Martyrs Cemetery, where victims of World War II are buried.

=== Population ===
In 1970, Freedom Hill had a population of 6,300. By 1990, this had risen to 13,600. However, the population decreased in subsequent years: in 1998, it stood at 12,200, in 2007 at 11,600, and in 2010 at 11,300. By the end of 2012, the population increased to 11,400, partially due to the development of residential housing.

=== Recreation ===
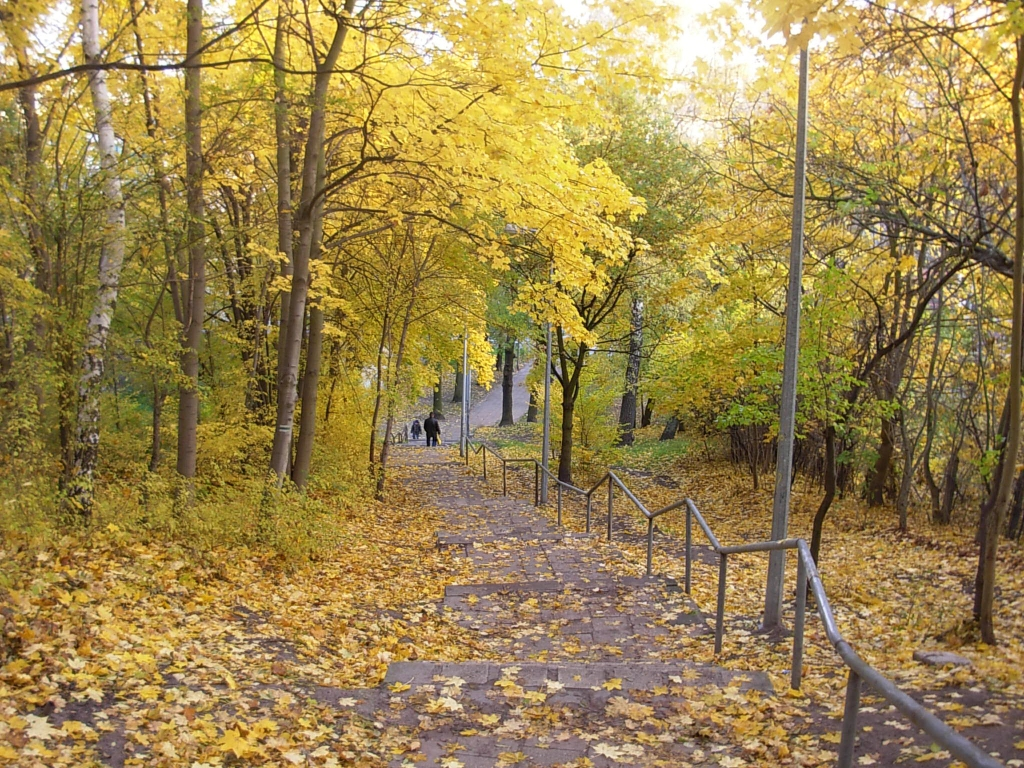
Stairs in the Freedom Hill Park

Freedom Hill features around 8 hectares of landscaped green areas and 4 hectares of natural greenery. The primary recreational area is the Freedom Hill Park, located along the northern boundary of the district and slated for modernization. It is accompanied by a walking path that extends from Górska Avenue in Szwederowo, linked by stairs to Kujawska and Toruńska streets. This path ends at the Bydgoszcz Martyrs Cemetery, offering a panoramic view of the city. About 2.5 kilometers away, through the Glinki district, one can access the Bydgoszcz Forest, while to the north, beyond the neighborhood, are the Brda river embankments and Central Park.

The neighborhood has bicycle paths along Wojska Polskiego Avenue, Kujawska Street, and the University Route. The Bydgoszcz transport study also anticipates further development of bike paths, including along Karpacka and Ujejski streets.

Two marked hiking trails run through Freedom Hill. The first is the red "Freedom" trail, which leads from Henryk Dąbrowski Park through the Freedom Hill Park and the Glinki district, then through the Bydgoszcz Forest to Jezuickie Lake and Nowa Wieś Wielka. The second is the green "Relax" trail, which starts at the footbridge over the Brda near the Bydgoszcz Martyrs Cemetery and continues along Kujawska Street, leading into the Bydgoszcz Forest and Jezuickie Lake in Chmielniki.

== History ==
=== Early Polish period ===
The history of the area now known as Freedom Hill is linked to the city farm of Rupienica, located along the Niziny stream, near what is now the intersection of John Paul II Avenue and Kujawska Street. In 1742, the Bydgoszcz city council leased the farm for a period of 40 years to Ewa and Krzysztof Jeski. Two flow-through ponds were created along the Niziny stream in the vicinity of the farm.

=== Partition period ===
In the 19th century, the farm bordered the village of Bielice to the west, Bartodzieje Małe to the north, and the Bydgoszcz Forest to the south and east. During this time, the Rupienica municipality was formed, encompassing areas from Kujawska Street to the east, extending to the end of Glinki Street. It included streets such as Niziny, Chorwacka, Karpacka (formerly Łysa Góra until 1925), Sieradzka (no longer existing), Sokola, Cmentarna, and Serbska.

Due to its location by a watercourse in a hilly terrain, the Germans named Rupienica Schondörf (Beautiful Village). A 1833 census from Bromberg listed 237 residents (115 Evangelicals, 118 Catholics, 4 Jews) living in 39 houses in the village and farm. According to a description by Jan Nepomucen Bobrowicz in 1846, the village of Rupienica was part of the estate belonging to the city of Bydgoszcz. A 1860 census reported 579 inhabitants (250 Evangelicals, 287 Catholics, 42 Jews) living in 51 houses. Evangelical children attended a local school, while Catholic children went to school in Bartodzieje. The settlement belonged to both Catholic and Evangelical parishes in Bydgoszcz. By 1852, the population of the Rupienica municipality had grown to 886. The 1910 census recorded 193 buildings and 2,330 residents, of which 791 spoke Polish, 1,537 spoke German, and 2 spoke Hebrew.

On 4 October 1905, the Committee for the Construction of the Bismarck Tower in Bydgoszcz was formed, chaired by the mayor Alfred Knobloch. Two years later, the site for the monument was named Bismarck Hill, and on 25 May 1913, the tower was officially opened. Due to its location on a hill, the Bismarck Tower served both as a monument and a lookout tower, with a terrace and entrance stairs. A large beacon atop the tower illuminated it at night. The structure was 25 meters tall, and from the highest terrace, visitors could enjoy a panoramic view of the city. Inside, a 2.6-meter tall bronze statue of Otto von Bismarck stood on a one-meter pedestal. The front wall of the tower featured the Bismarck family coat of arms, while the side walls displayed 25 honor plaques funded by figures such as the German Emperor Wilhelm II, Chancellor Theobald von Bethmann Hollweg, Hanseatic city senates of Lübeck and Bremen, and local military and administrative authorities.

Around the monument, a park was designed, utilizing the existing natural forest and the distinctive terrain of the high escarpment of the river valley, cut by erosion gullies. For this reason, the park was designed in a forest-mountain (Tatra) style, covering an area of 7 hectares. From 1913 to 1919, the Bismarck Tower became a venue for many ceremonies and a popular city attraction, regarded as the most beautiful structure of its type in the eastern reaches of the German Empire.

=== Interwar period ===
After Bydgoszcz became part of the re-established Poland, on 1 April 1920, the Rupienica farm municipality was incorporated into the city. This name appeared on city plans until 1973.

The dominant landmark of the area was the Bismarck Tower, which the city council renamed the Freedom Tower on 22 October 1921, and the previously named Bismarck Hill became Freedom Hill. A year earlier, the equipment and donor plaques from the tower were removed and taken to Germany. According to initial plans, the tower was to be converted into a chapel, and a large cross was to be placed atop the site of the fire bowl. However, the transformation of the building failed, and the unutilized tower, which still resembled its Prussian-era design, was blown up in May 1928. The rubble from the demolition was used, among other things, to build the foundations for the power plant under construction in Jachcice.

During the interwar period, residential buildings with gardens appeared along Kujawska, Karpacka, and Ujejski streets, and in the valley of the Niziny stream. The inner parts of the district, near the escarpment, were used as fields and fallow land. Along the stream running through the valley, Niziny Street was lined with around 60 houses with gardens, built on land that had been divided and sold by the local landowner. The main streets – Kujawska, Sieradzka, and Karpacka – were paved with cobblestones, while other streets were covered with slag. Until 1925, Karpacka Street, from Kujawska Street to Sokola Street, was named Łysa Góra Street. Rupienica did not have direct communication with the city center, but for some time, a private bus service ran to Szwederowo, passing through Konopna Street.

The predominant architecture in the area was one-story, brick-built houses with rental apartments. The owners occupied the apartments and also served as caretakers and administrators. In the 1930s, local residents were engaged in agriculture, crafts, trade, and worked in Bydgoszcz's industrial factories. From 1930 to 1939, a kindergarten at 25 Rupienica Street served about 170 children, who were part of the Citizens' Association of Working Women. There was also a seven-class Queen Jadwiga Public Elementary School No. 15, located on Karpacka Street. In 1926, at the initiative of the school headmaster and Bydgoszcz city councilor Antoni Zawadzki, the Rupienica Citizens' Association was established. In 1924, the Sokół movement was also founded in the Rupienica district. On the corner of Kujawska and Karpacka streets stood a brick chapel with a plaster statue of the Virgin Mary with the Infant Jesus, which was destroyed by the occupiers on the last Sunday of September 1939.

One of the buildings from the 1930s that still survives today is the residential building at 21 Ujejski Street, built in 1899 from leftover bricks from the construction of the main post office building.

=== Post-War Period ===
In 1946, on the land previously occupied by the Bismarck Tower, the Bydgoszcz Martyrs Cemetery was established. Between 1946 and 1948, the exhumed bodies of 1,169 Bydgoszcz residents who were murdered during the Nazi occupation of the city were buried there (including those killed at the Old Market Square, in the Valley of Death, and in the surrounding woods). Symbolic graves were also arranged, including those of Bydgoszcz mayors Leon Barciszewski and Bernard Śliwiński.

Starting in the 1950s, residential construction began to expand in the district, intensifying from 1961 when the Bydgoszcz City National Council designated building plots for individual construction. Single-family housing estates were built along Słowiańska, Serbska, and Bułgarska streets. The new urban division in the general urban planning of Bydgoszcz from 1964 defined the Freedom Hill unit, which consisted of a portion of the former Rupienica municipality in the eastern part and the so-called Probostwo, and a part of the Bartodzieje Małe municipality in the western part. At the same time, the area was reclassified for multi-family high-rise construction, reflecting a change in the city's growth outlook.

In the 1970s, several plans for developing Freedom Hill into a new residential district were proposed. The last of these was created by architects Michał Holka, Henryk Golz, and Witold Migdał from Bydgoszcz’s "Inwestprojekt". The estate was divided into sectors:

- A-1 with a printing plant,
- A-2 in the northeastern part, near the escarpment, designed to house 2,500 people,
- A-3 in the southeastern part, on both sides of Ujejskiego Street, for 5,200 people,
- A-4 – the remaining part of the district, for 5,500 people.

Twelve-story buildings were planned throughout, with the A-4 sector planned for five-story buildings. The design focused on preserving green spaces, utilizing earth from excavations to create hills and valleys. Small gardens were planned for the windows of the blocks. The communication layout was centered around two main axes: east-west (Wojska Polskiego Avenue) and north-south (Nowoogiński Street). The sectors were to be connected by footbridges over the communication routes. The plan also included a park on the escarpment by Toruńska Street and services to be developed in the future.

Preparing the land required significant investment in utilities, including water, sewage, heating systems, gas lines, and the expansion of the water intake and the construction of a new central heating plant. Construction work began in 1977 with the participation of Grudziądz General Construction Enterprise and Bydgoszcz’s Construction Combine "Wschód", which provided large panel system building. The estate was developed alongside the Szwederowo district and in parallel with the construction of Fordon. The new apartments were managed by the Bydgoszcz Housing Cooperative.

In the 1980s, most of the multi-family buildings were completed, housing relatively young families. Many of the construction companies involved were from outside Bydgoszcz, including from Grudziądz and Inowrocław. Significant delays in providing infrastructure, particularly social infrastructure, occurred during this period. In the meantime, transport infrastructure investments were completed, including the Wojska Polskiego Avenue with a tram line, the expanded Kujawska Street with underground pedestrian crossings, and a six-lane dual carriageway in the Niziny valley (renamed John Paul II Avenue in the 1990s), which became part of the north-south transit route through Bydgoszcz, connecting to national road 5. This development required the relocation of residents. In 1988, the Press Graphic Plant headquarters opened at Wojska Polskiego Avenue, housing production halls, warehouses, and a design and administration center (renamed Ortis S.A. in 2003).

After 1990, the district saw the construction of commercial buildings, with new multi-family buildings rising from the late 1990s. Four of these buildings were completed by the Bydgoszcz Housing Cooperative. The building at 50 Ujejski Street won the Grand Prix 2007 for Pomerania and Kuyavia. In 2001, the headquarters of TVP3 Bydgoszcz was opened in the area.

In September 2011, a mural was created on the wall of the building at 29 Karpacka Street, depicting the difficult winter journey of a traveler facing adversities. The theme and details of the painting were chosen by the residents of a local social welfare home. In September 2019, the city authorities announced a competition for a mural to commemorate the 100th anniversary of Bydgoszcz’s return to Poland. It was completed in November 2019 on the gable wall of the building at 39c Karpacka Street, created by artist Dawid Celek. The mural refers to the historical event of the symbolic handover of the city’s keys from the German mayor Hugo Wolf to the first Polish president Jan Maciaszek.

== Neighborhood Council ==
Administratively, the district (which also includes the Babia Wieś district) forms an auxiliary unit of the Bydgoszcz City Government. The Freedom Hill District Council is located at Ujejski Street.

== Infrastructure ==
=== Religious buildings ===
- St. Hedwig the Queen Church – built between 1980 and 1990
- Bydgoszcz Martyrs Cemetery – established in 1946

=== Sports and recreational facilities ===
- Eugeniusz Połtyn Municipal Stadium – 7 Słowiańska Street
- Playgrounds (e.g., 3 Bośniacka Street, Tucholska Street)
- Freeride tracks Drzewniak and Bizon in the Freedom Hill Park
- Family Allotment Gardens Okucia Meblowe – located on the eastern edge of the district, near John Paul II Avenue

=== Education ===
- Arkady Fiedler Primary School No. 56 – Karpacka Street; in 2021, a plan was made to create a square with fruit and vegetable sections, a sensory garden, and a flower meadow
- Training and Implementation Center – located in the former public school building on 54 Karpacka Street
- International School in Bydgoszcz – 3 Bośniacka Street (former location of Primary School No. 56)

=== Other ===
- Bydgoszcz City Police Headquarters – 4f Wojska Polskiego Street
- TVP3 Bydgoszcz Regional Television Headquarters – 7 Kujawska Street
- Jan Biziel University Hospital No. 2 – 75 Ujejski Street
- Branches of the Provincial and Municipal Public Library – 58 Ujejski Street and 75 Ujejski Street (in the hospital)
- Building at 19 Karpacka Street from 1880, featuring a bas-relief of a bearded man's face.

== Curiosities ==
=== Remains of the Bismarck Tower ===
The remains of the Bismarck Tower consist of an elevation within the Bydgoszcz Martyrs Cemetery, in its northeastern section, where an altar and a cross are now located. These are the original foundations of the tower. Additionally, remnants of the stairs that once led from Toruńska Street to the Bismarck Tower can still be seen on the slope of Freedom Hill.

=== Schools ===
The first school in the Rupienica area was established in 1831. In 1856, an evangelical school building with a single classroom was constructed on Karpacka Street. Following a reorganization of the Prussian education system in 1875, a shared school for all children was created, serving 160 evangelical and 140 Catholic children.

In 1878, the building was expanded with additional wings, and in 1912, a new school building was constructed nearby. Queen Jadwiga During the interwar period, the facility housed a seven-grade Queen Jadwiga Public Elementary School No. 15, serving over 700 students. The premises included a sports field, and a former fire station at the intersection of Rupienica and Karpacka streets was converted into a school workshop. The school also featured a choir, the 22nd Bydgoszcz Scout Troop named after Queen Jadwiga, and a savings bank. During summer vacations, the school organized scout camps, including in Bysław near Tuchola (1933), Jaworzyna near Limanowa (1935), and Brzoza near Bydgoszcz (1939).

After World War II, the school operated in this building until 1982, when a new two-story school building with a gymnasium and sports fields was opened nearby. This housed Janusz Korczak Primary School No. 21. Following the 1999 education reform, the building became home to Junior High School No. 20, named after Queen Jadwiga in 2009.

The old building at 54 Karpacka Street hosted the Higher School of Health Sciences from 2005 to 2017. This was the first private medical university in the Kuyavian-Pomeranian region. In 2022, the building was handed over to the County Office to house a branch of the psychological and pedagogical counseling center.

=== Trams ===
In 1977, city authorities introduced a municipal development plan, envisioning the gradual replacement of narrow-gauge tram tracks with standard-gauge ones. Construction of a wide-gauge tram line along Wojska Polskiego Avenue, from Magnuszewska to Kujawska streets, began in 1978 and was completed in 1980. However, an economic crisis made a citywide track conversion unfeasible, and by the end of 1981, the decision was made to revert to the 1000-mm gauge.

The tramway on Wojska Polskiego Avenue was adapted accordingly by 1984, and the first tram reached Freedom Hill on 2 October 1984.
