= Central Park, Bydgoszcz =

Urban park, 20th century, Bydgoszcz, Poland

Central Park
- Polish: Park Centralny w Bydgoszczy
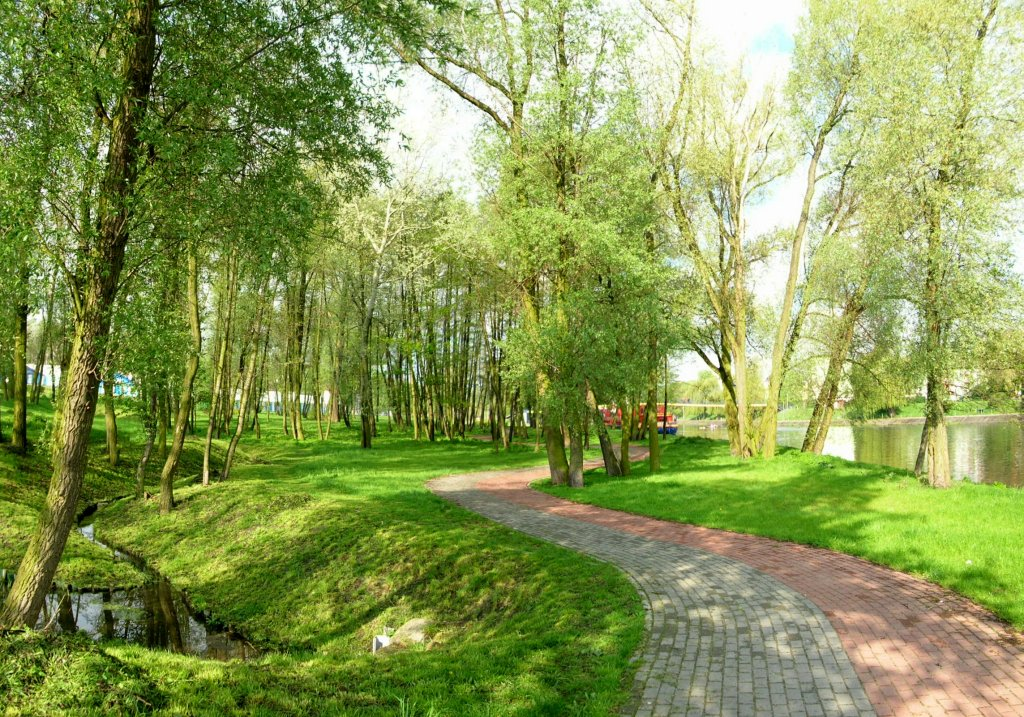
- Central park in Bydgoszcz

- Location within Kuyavian-Pomeranian Voivodeship
- Interactive map of Central Park
- Location: Bydgoszcz, Poland
- Coordinates: 53°07′08″N 18°01′47″E
- Area: 6.22 hectares (15.4 acres)
- Created: 1974
- Owner: City of Bydgoszcz

Park Centralny (English: Central Park) is an urban green area located along the side of the Brda river in Bydgoszcz, Poland. The park covers 6.22 hectares (15.4 acres).

== Location ==
The park is situated in "Babia Wieś" district, along the Brda river, on its southern bank.

The area has a rectangle shape of 750 metres (2,460 ft) by 250 metres (820 ft):

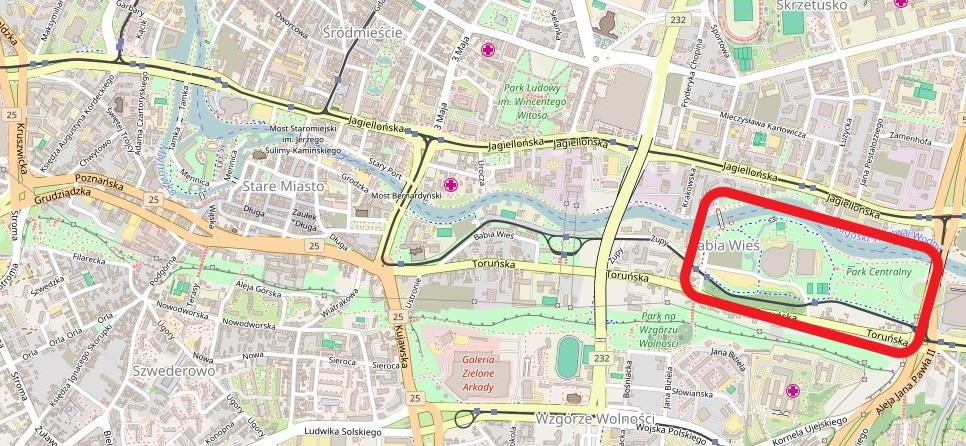
Park Centralny on a map of Bydgoszcz

- to the north, it borders a promenade along the river;
- to the west, it ends at the Łuczniczka sport arena;
- it extends to the south to the bottom of the Wolności Hill, along the Toruńska street;
- its eastern limit runs along the Jana Pawła II avenue.

A tram railway runs along the southern outskirts of the park: it is used by lines 4, 5 and 6.

On park's eastern border, a water stream flows into the Brda river. It stems from Glinki district in the south and is canalized in a pipe under Jana Pawła II avenue before pouring into the river.

== History ==
=== Early plans ===
Park Centralny was established in 1972-1974 on extensive meadows stretching between the Brda river and Toruńska street.

Its creation is the result of two projects connected with the area. On the one hand, the rehabilitation of the Brda riversides which had started in the 1960s, aiming at tidying up and embellishing the bank promenades. On the other hand, the construction of a north-south road cutting through the heart of the city, part of the S5 expressway, crossing the river east of Babia Wieś district.

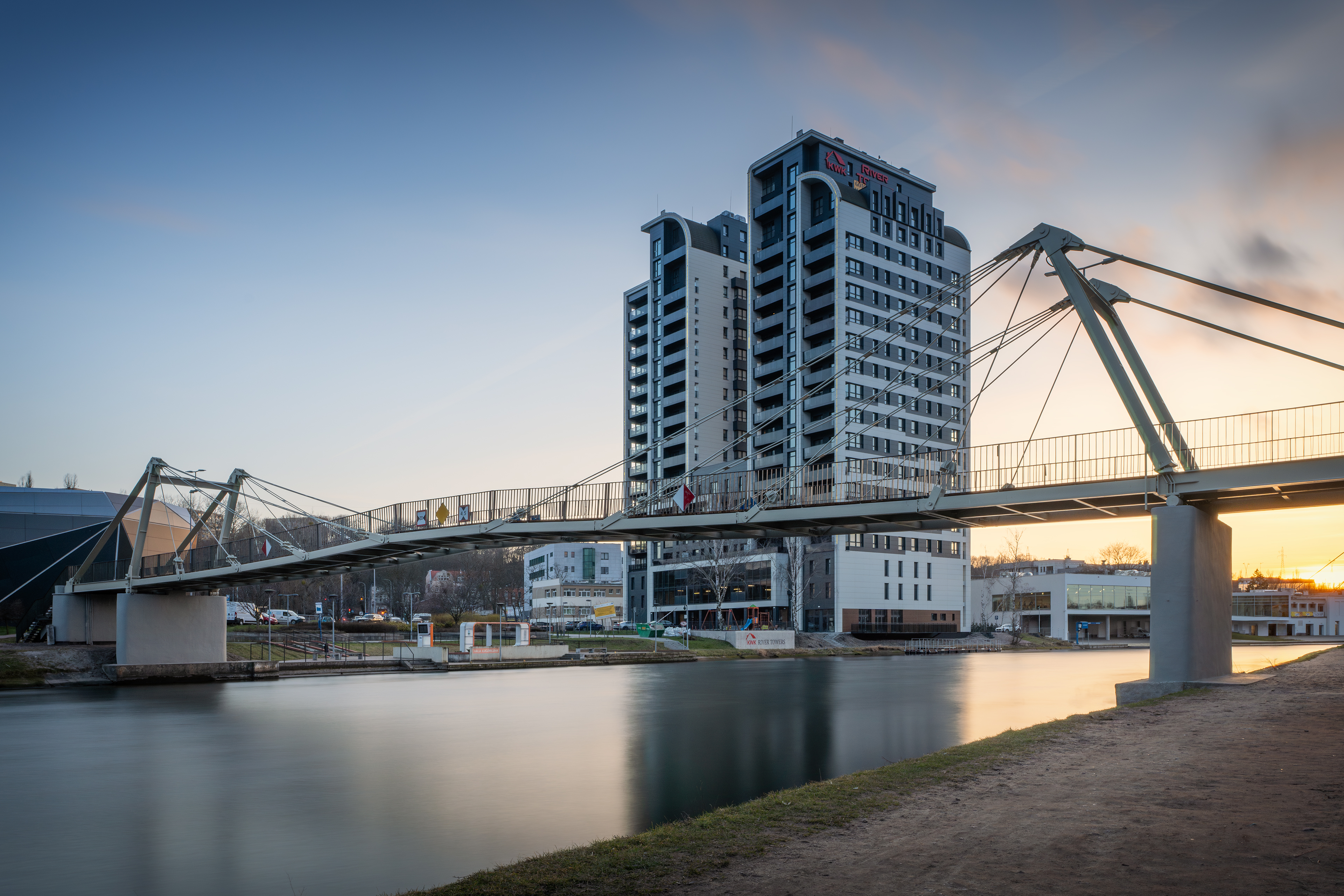
Footbridge across the Brda river

In 1973, a competition for the construction of a sport and entertainment hall in the park was launched. The prize winner was awarded to a design by Warsaw architects under the supervision of designer and sport champion Wojciech Zabłocki. The communist authorities had opted for buildings which shapes represented a "frog" (for the main hall arena) and a "butterfly" (for the sport hall), both displaying colored coating roof tops. However, the dire financial situation that Poland was facing at the time did not allow the plan to be pushed to completion. Only tennis courts, archery tracks and asphalt walking paths were built.

In the second half of the 1970s, a pedestrian bridge over the Brda river was built at the level of Krakowska street, significantly improving the connection to the park from the northern districts of Bydgoszcz.

=== Later developments ===
In October 2002, in the western part of the park, Łuczniczka, a sport arena with more than 8500 seats, was opened on the site of the former archery tracks. The name "Łuczniczka" (English: Archeress) is a reference to one of the city's hallmark, "The Archeress", a 1910 statue by Ferdinand Lepcke, standing in a downtown park. In 2019, with the firm Grupa Kapitałowa IMMOBILE becoming the main sponsor of the sports and entertainment arena for five years, the facility was officially renamed "Immobile Łuczniczka". The construction of the complex was the opportunity to re-design the surrounding areas with:

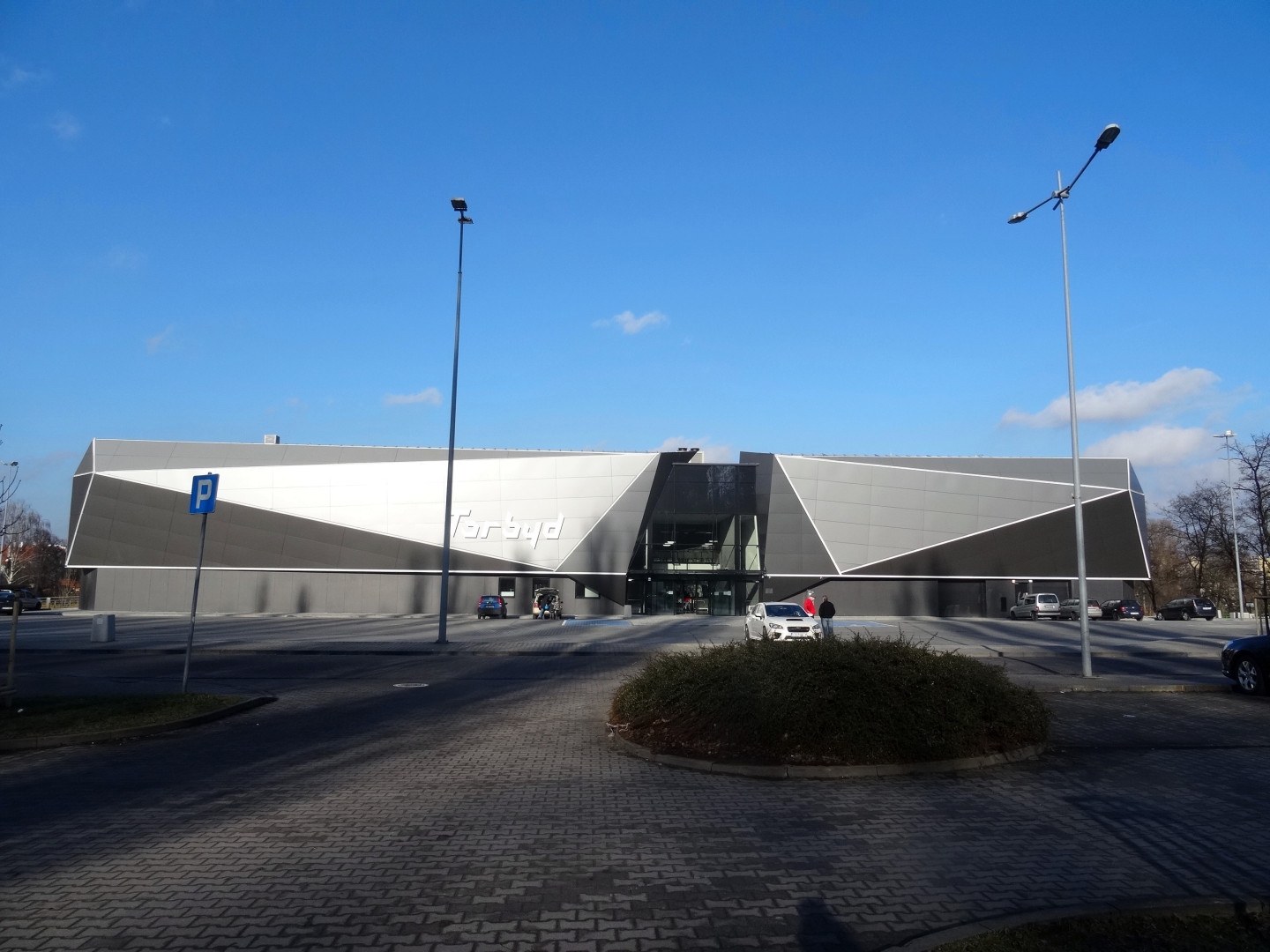
Torbyd ice rink

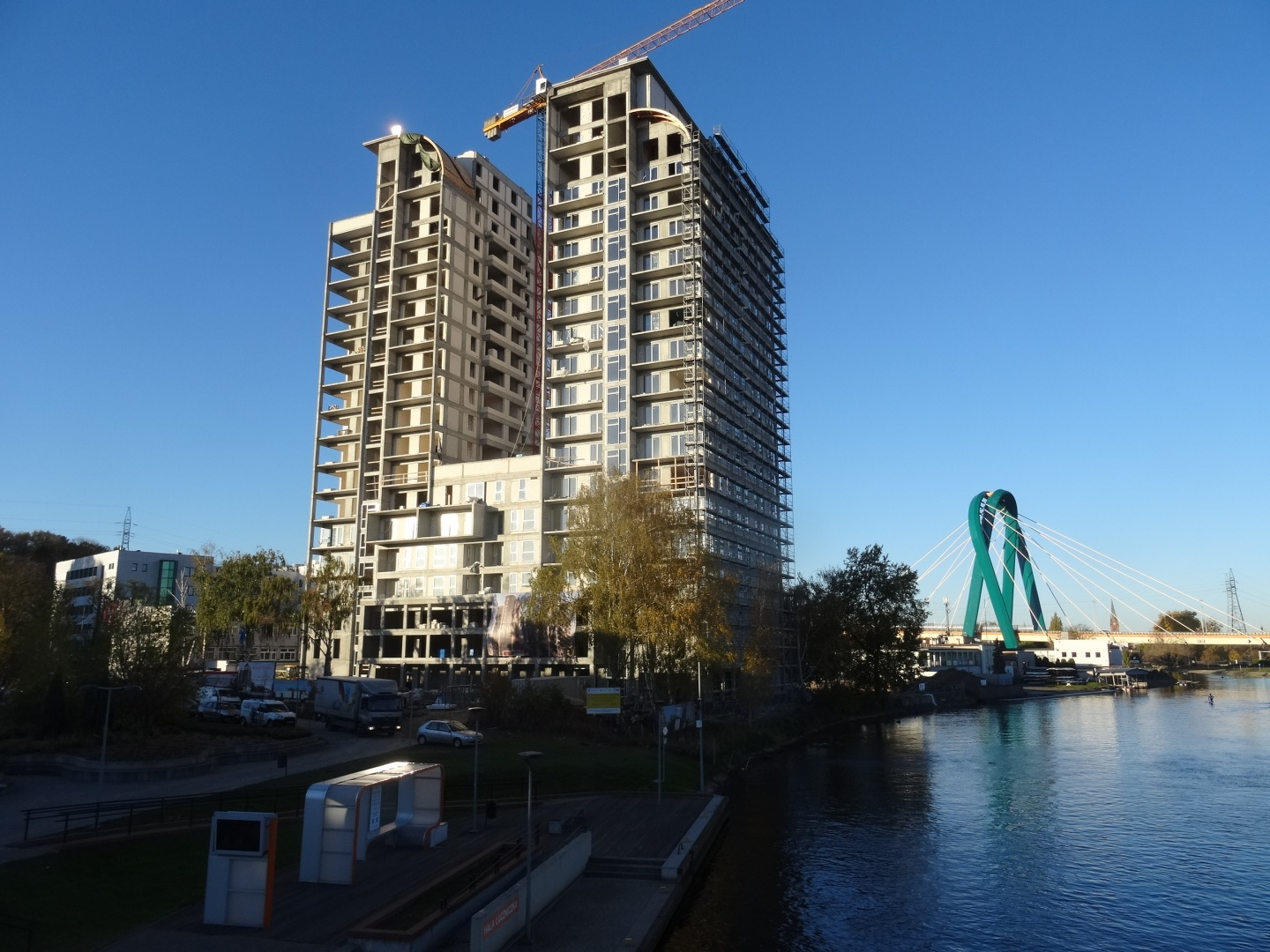
"River Tower" being built

- new walking paths;
- a slipway for vessels sailing on the Brda River;
- new archery tracks;
- a cleaning of the greenery and new tree plantings.

Furthermore, watercourses and pond around the hall were renovated.

In September 2014, on the eastern side of the Łuczniczka hall, a smaller sports and entertainment arena (1500-seat capacity) was unveiled, Grupa Moderator Arena. The latter was first operated the same year as a warm-up hall for the matches of the 2014 FIVB Volleyball Men's World Championship that occurred in Bydgoszcz. On a daily basis, the arena is used by Bydgoszcz basketball teams, women's Artego Bydgoszcz and men's Astoria Bydgoszcz. The facility is also rented for the economic fairs, exhibitions, concerts and shows.

On January 5, 2018, on the western side of the Łuczniczka hall, an ice rink named Torbyd has been inaugurated. The 240-seat stadium replaces the old ice rink (dismantled in 2004) which used to be located at 11a Chopina street.

In 2020, a large real estate was unveiled on the western tip of the park, "River Tower". Located along the river, in the vicinity of Łuczniczka and Torbyd halls, it consists of a pair of 64 metres (210 ft)-high and 20-floors towers. The twin buildings, encompassing 128 apartments, are the tallest residential edifice in Bydgoszcz and houses also a restaurant, a gym, a playing ground for children and a mini-marina.

A new project has been unveiled in early 2021 by the city authorities: the creation of an open-air bathing area for 500 people along the Brda river. So far, this announcement has been met with criticism. Commentaries report that the construction would imply the cutting of 94 trees of 25 species, including 6 monumental ones. In addition, it would destroy most of the wetlands, reduce the biologically active soil and degrade the habitats of many vertebrates and insects. In a will to placete the debate, the city of Bydgoszcz has decided to set up an on-line consultation about the project.

== Characteristics ==
Park Centralny is settled on and above the Brda river floodplain. Some remarkable natural places have been preserved here, such as alder carrs.

The park is mainly wooded by native tree species growing in moist soils: willows, ash trees, alders, poplars, maple trees, lime trees (including large-leaved lindens), common oaks, northern red oaks, hornbeams, elms and common hawthorns.

A large area is occupied by a recreational meadow. There are also fruit trees and shrubs, which are a staple for many birds living in the area. You can also find here herbaceous plants such as garden angelicas or butterburs.

In 2020, bird spotters noticed the presence of cormorants, goosanders and European green woodpeckers in the park.

The park has a network of walking paths with benches, criss-crossing the different sports facilities:

- the sport halls (Łuczniczka, Grupa Moderator Arena and Torbyd);
- archery tracks;
- tennis courts;
- open air pitches.

On the river bank in front of the Torbyd ice rink stands a water tram stop, part of a touristic line starting downtown at the Fish Market (Polish: Rybi Rynek). Around the Łuczniczka hall, watercourses are regulated via a pond which overflows directly its waters to the Brda river.

== Gallery ==
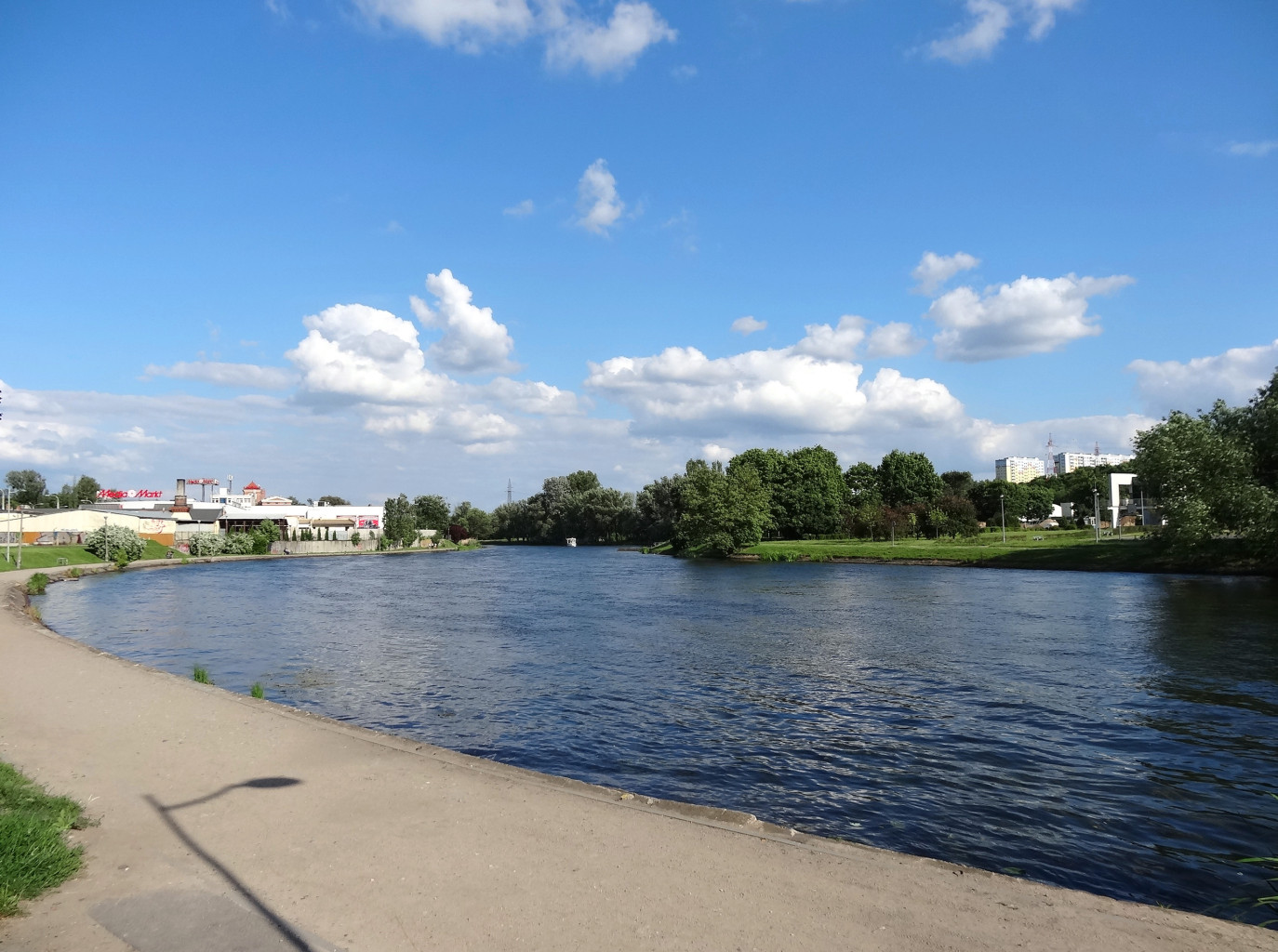
View from the northern bank

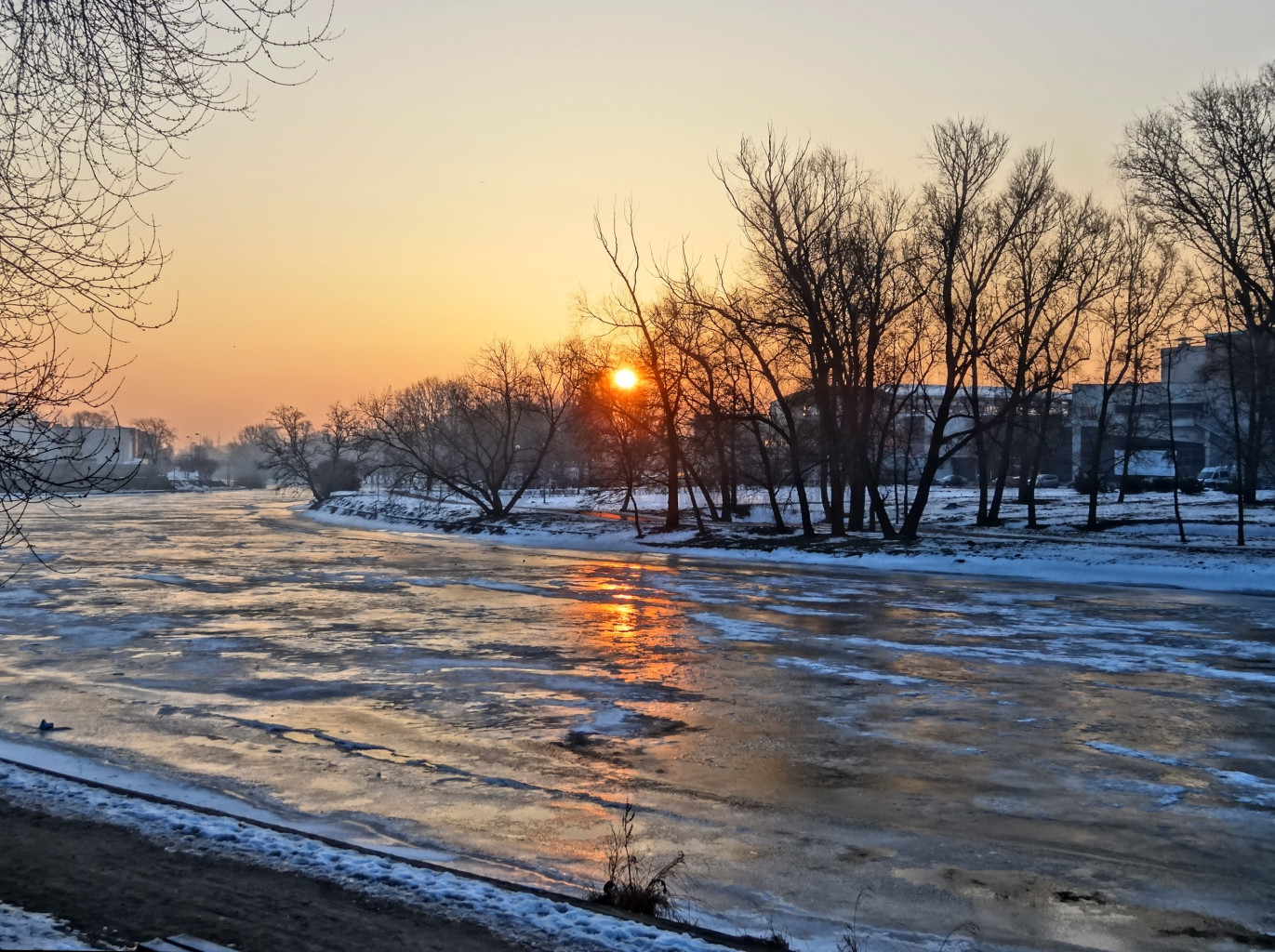
Winter time

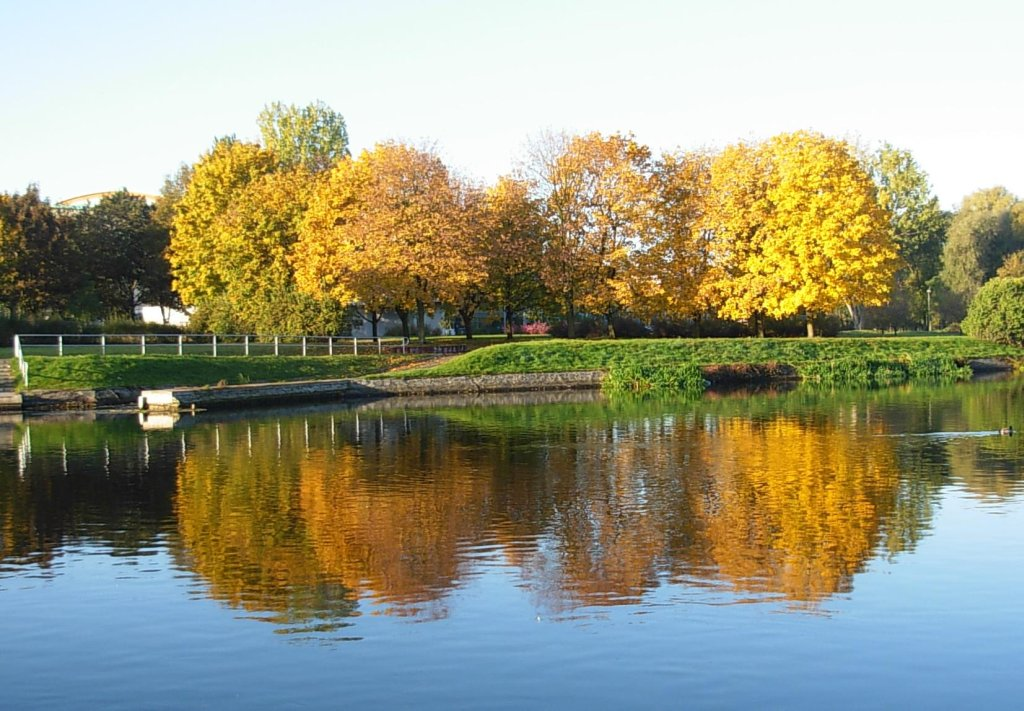
River bank in autumn

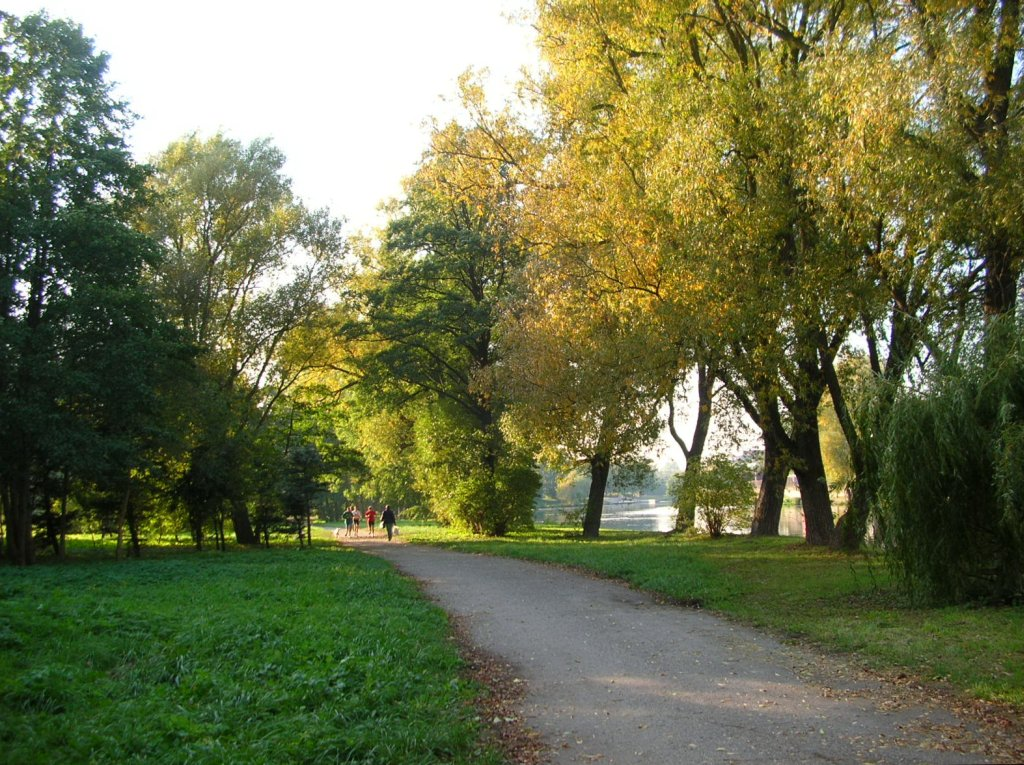
Walking path

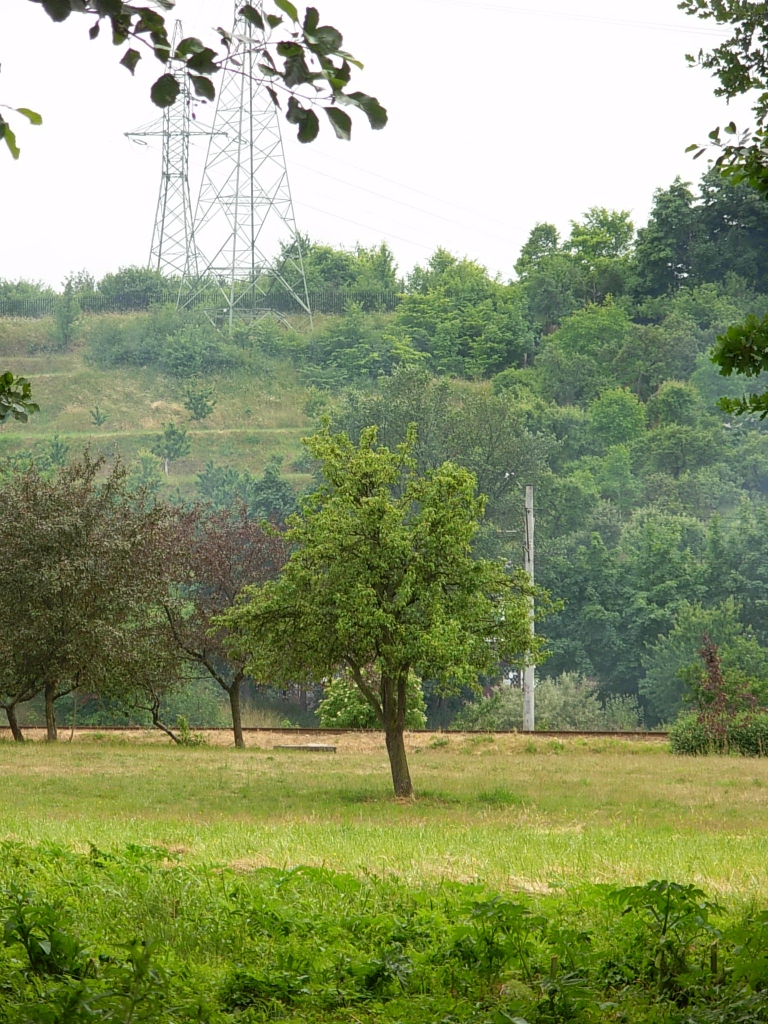
In the park

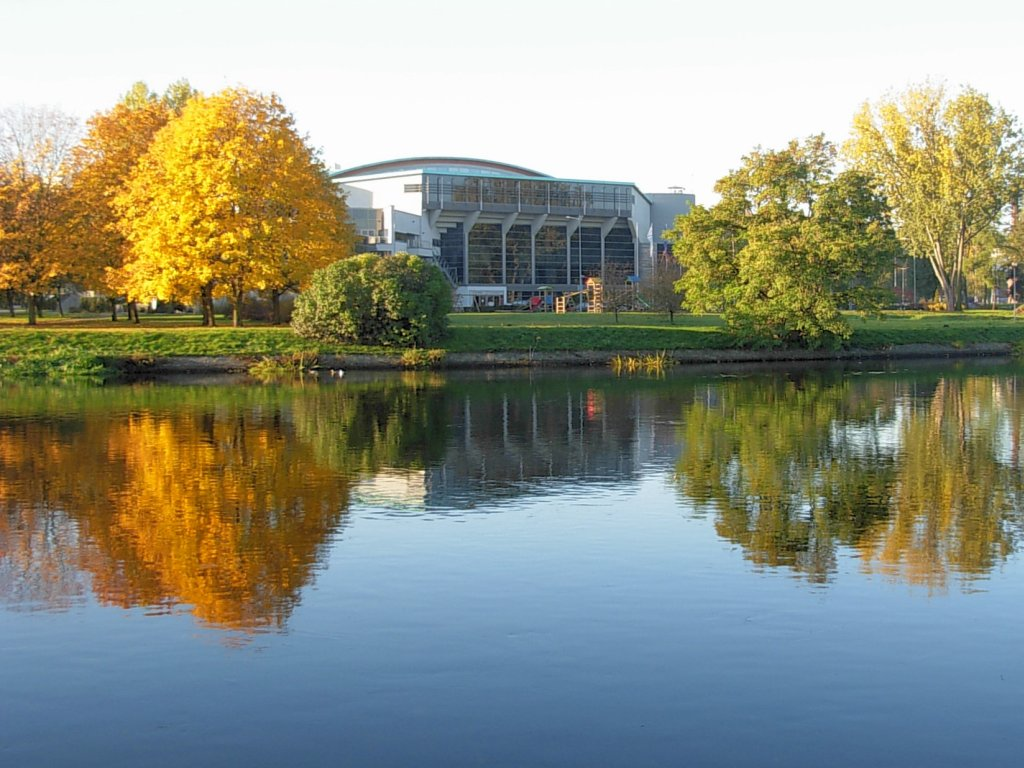
View of the Łuczniczka arena

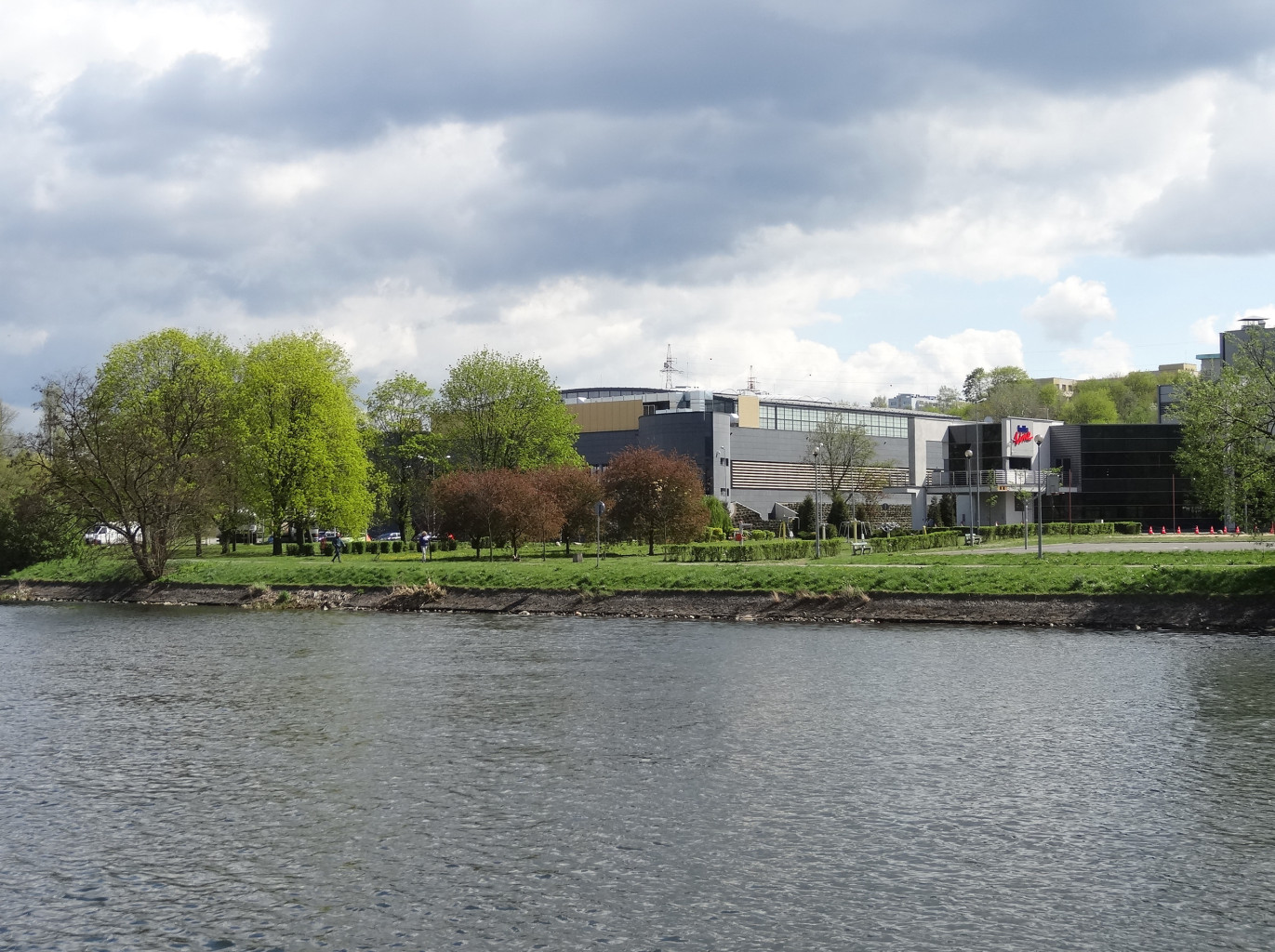
View of the Artego Arena

== See also ==
- Bydgoszcz
- Łuczniczka

== Bibliography ==
- S. Pastuszewski (1996). Bydgoska Gospodarka Komunalna (in Polish). Bydgoszcz: Instytut Wydawniczy „Świadectwo”. ISBN 8385860371.
- Umiński, Janusz (1996). Bydgoszcz. Przewodnik (in Polish). Bydgoszcz: Regionalny Oddział PTTK „Szlak Brdy”.
