= War College Building, Bydgoszcz =

War College building in Bydgoszcz
- Polish: Gmach Szkoły Wojennej w Bydgoszczy
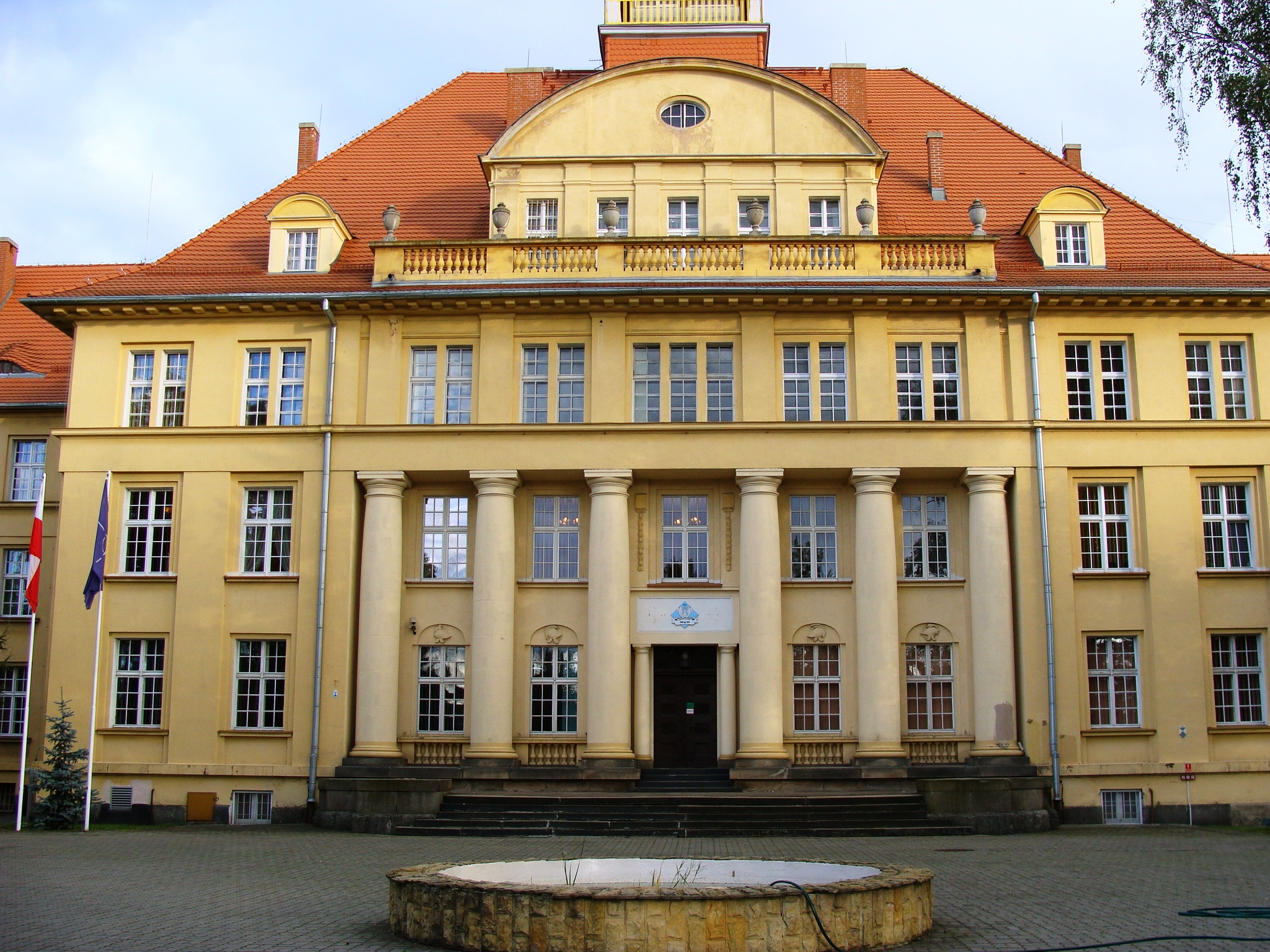
- View from Gdanska street
- Interactive map of the War College building in Bydgoszcz area

General information
- Type: Military School
- Architectural style: Eclecticism & Neo-baroque
- Classification: Nr.601325-Reg.A/30/1-6, 28 December 2000
- Location: 190 Gdańska street, Bydgoszcz, Poland, Poland
- Coordinates: 53°8′28″N 18°1′11″E
- Construction started: 1913
- Completed: 1914
- Client: German Army (German Empire)
- Landlord: Ministry of National Defence (Poland)

Technical details
- Floor count: 4

Design and construction
- Architects: Arnold Hartmann, Robert Schlezinger

The War College building in Bydgoszcz is a historical building in Bydgoszcz, at 190 Gdańska Street, property of Polish MOD. It is registered on the Kuyavian-Pomeranian Voivodeship Heritage List.

== Location ==
The building stands on the eastern side of Gdanska Street, in the area delimitated by:

- Dwernicki street;
- Żołnierska street;
- Czerkaska street;
- Gdańska Street.

This whole area lies within the Forest district in Bydgoszcz.

== History ==
The building was built between 1913 and 1914 and designed by German architects Arnold Hartman and Robert Schlezinger.

The 1913 initial footprint of the project covered an area of approximately 22 hectares within the administrative boundaries of the city.

The estate was planned to be the seat of the German War College (German: Kriegschule), but the start of World War I changed it all, and the edifice housed during the conflict a German military hospital.

In 1920 the building was taken over by the Polish authorities of the city. After lengthy negotiations and efforts of General Kazimierz Sosnkowski, then Deputy Minister of Military Affairs, the city agreed to hand over the edifice to the Polish Ministry of Military Affairs.

On July 11, 1920, the building housed the High School of Infantry which had moved from Poznań due to the Polish–Soviet War.

On August 1, 1922, the school was converted into an Officer Academy for Non-Commissioned Officers (NCOs) and on August 9, 1928, it has been renamed the NCO Cadet School.

In the first half 1939, the building housed the Naval Cadet School.

From July 1, 1943 to January 17, 1945 the building, seized by Nazi armed forces, has accommodated the Intelligence and Cavalry School (German: Aufklärungs- und Kavallerieschule). After the liberation of Bydgoszcz in January 1945, Soviet troops were billeted here.

From 1947 to 2007, the edifice housed the Pomeranian Military District Command, and since 2007 it is the seat of the Inspectorate of Armed Forces Support.

In an adjacent building is open a military museum.

== Architecture ==
The massive building has a E-shaped foot print, following eclecticism style with a clear predominance of neo-Baroque elements. The building has a prominent avant-corps on its center and wings: all is topped with high Mansard roofs with dormers.

The front portico, with Tuscan styled columns is prominent and topped by a balcony crowned with an elliptical pediment. The facade is divided by a series of decorative cornices and wide pilasters.

Among the noteworthy elements of architectural decoration and stucco are:

- stone balusters and helmets;
- flaming vases;
- pelmets and Bydgoszcz's coats of arms.

The interiors still preserve the original layout: adorned staircases, arcade hall, tiled corridors and walls with panelling and pilasters, and stucco ceilings.

Next to the War College is the former Directorate building (Polish: Willa Komendanta). It is an impressive villa with a portico, terraces, balconies and stylised pediments. The whole area is surrounded by a cast-iron fence, decorated with stone trophies.

The building and its architectural environment has been put on the Kuyavian-Pomeranian Voivodeship Heritage List Nr.601325 Reg.A/30/1-6, on December 28, 2000.

== Gallery ==
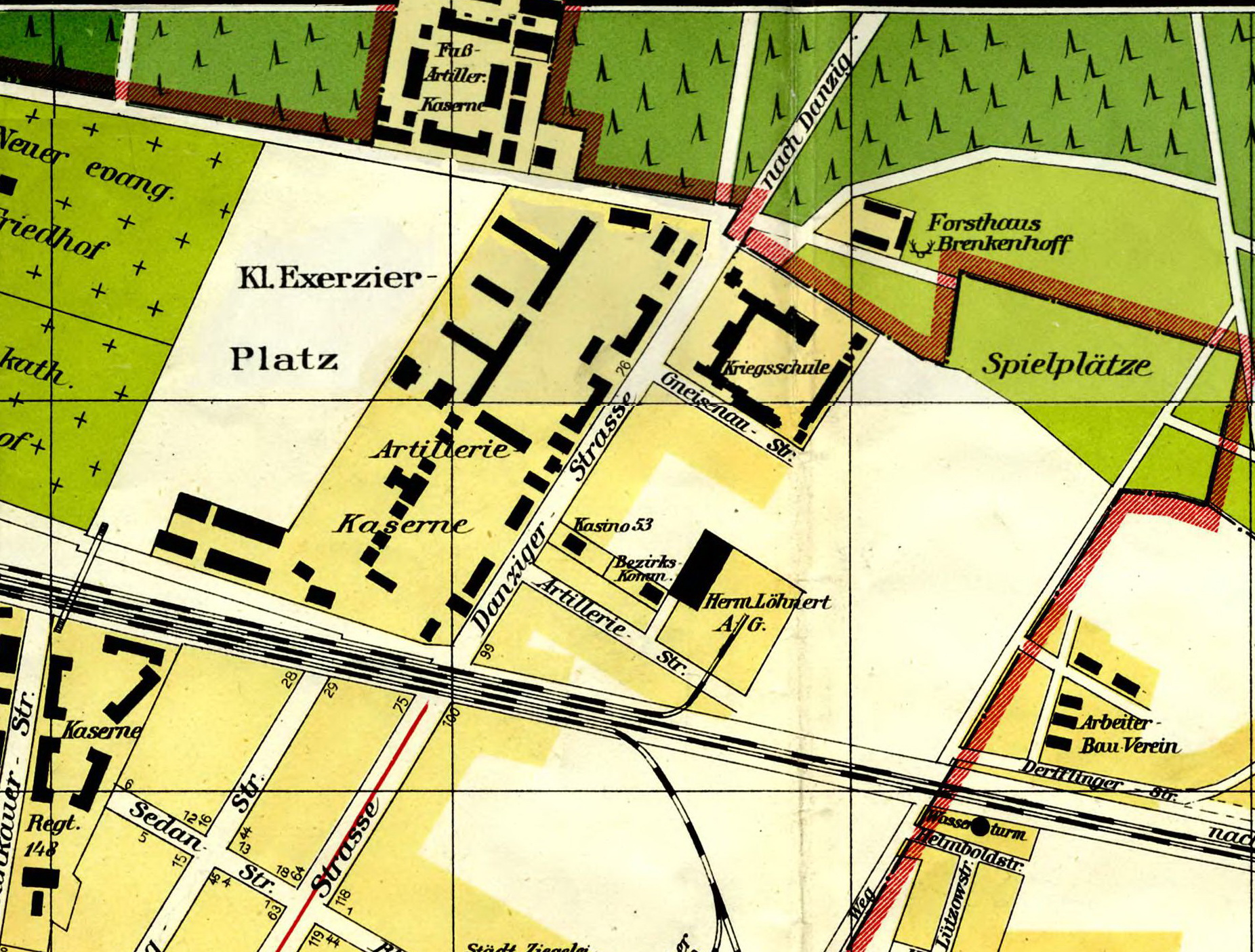
Detail of 1914 map with military area

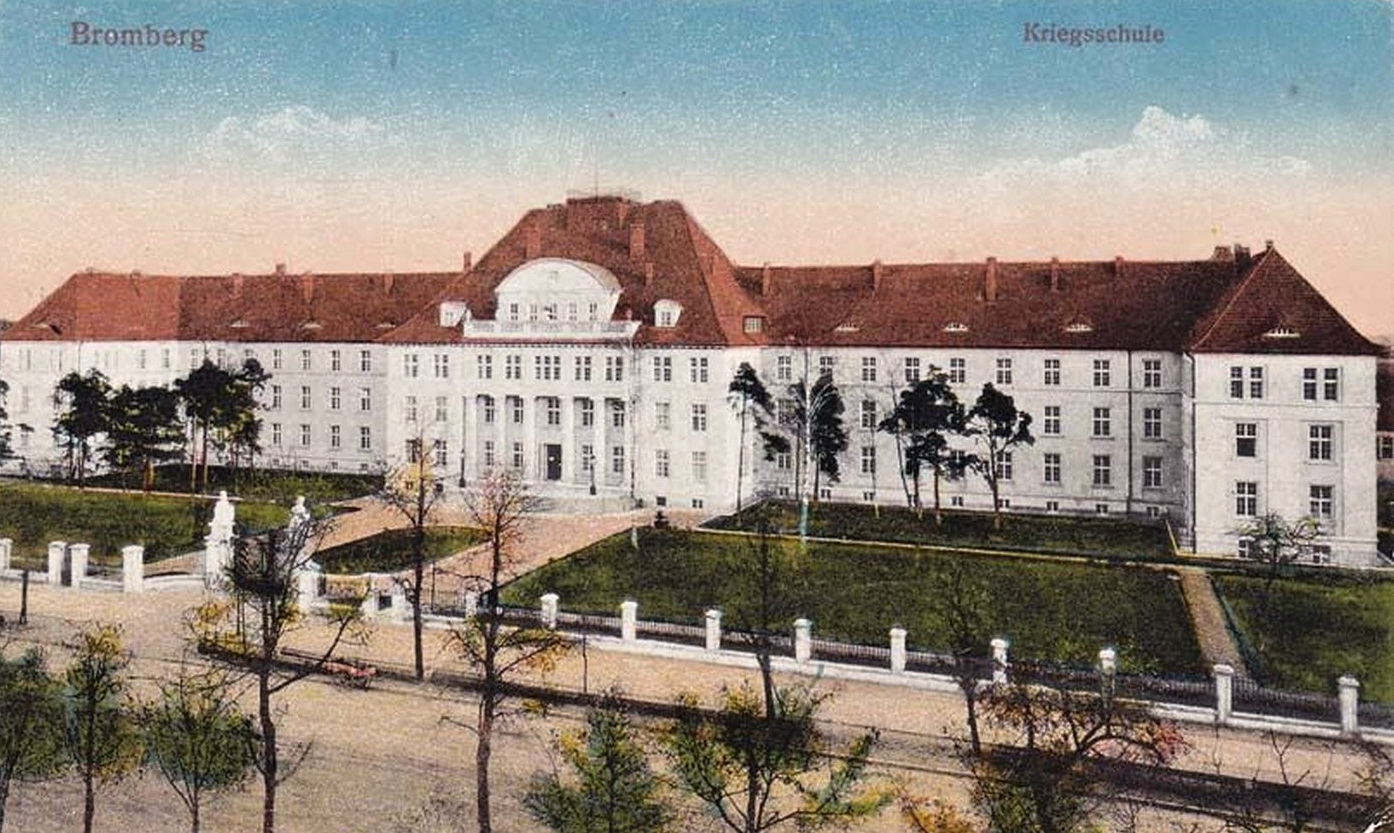
War college in Bromberg, 1916

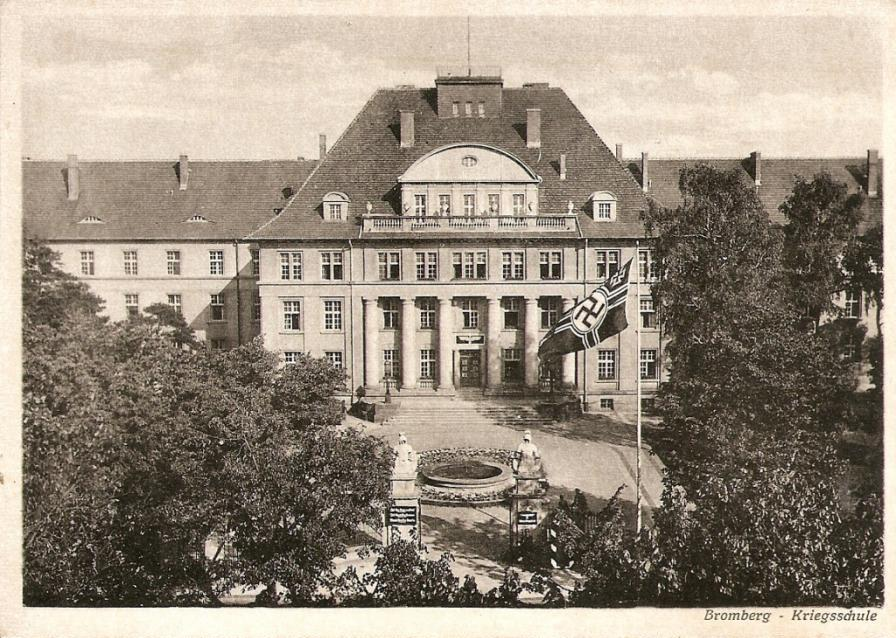
War College Bydgoszcz, 1938

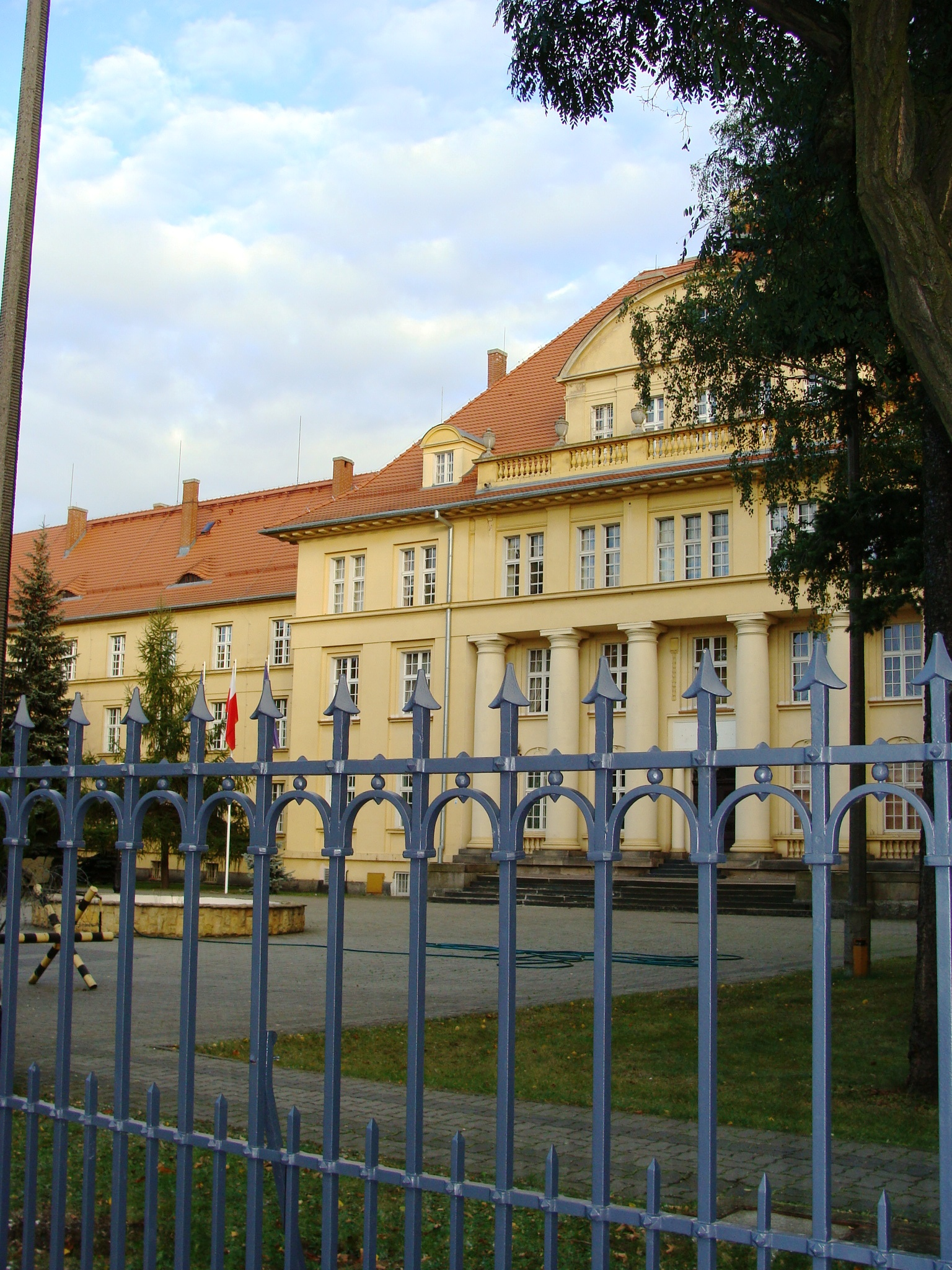
View with the cast-iron fence

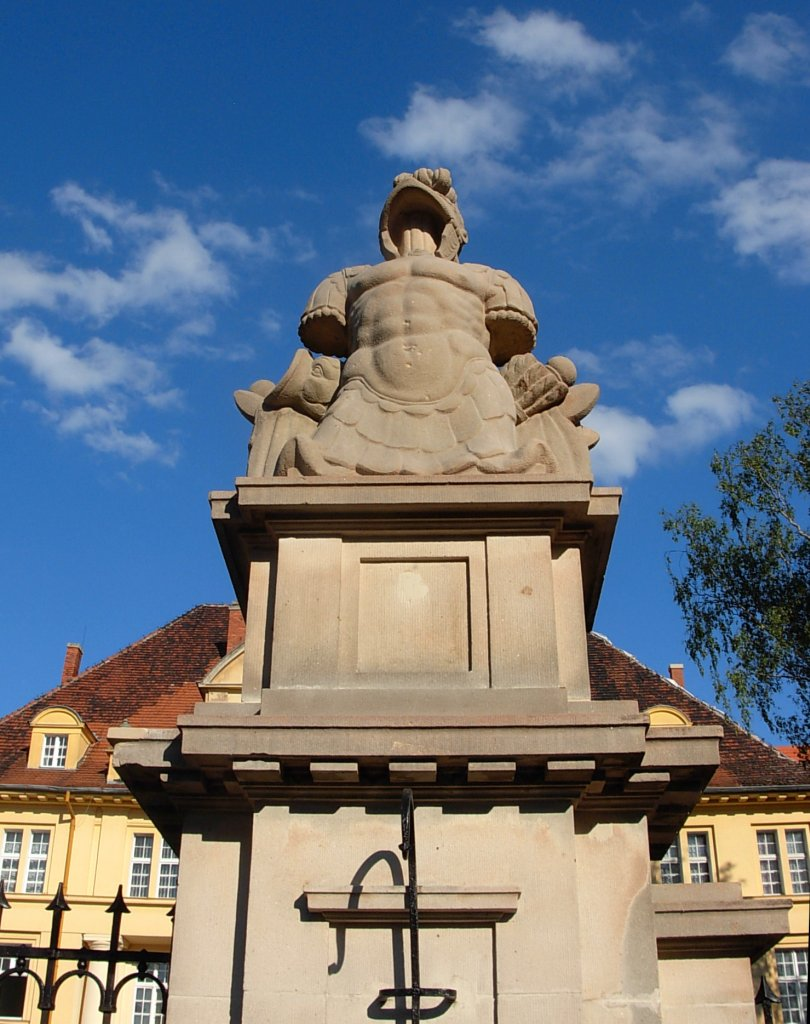
Stone figure

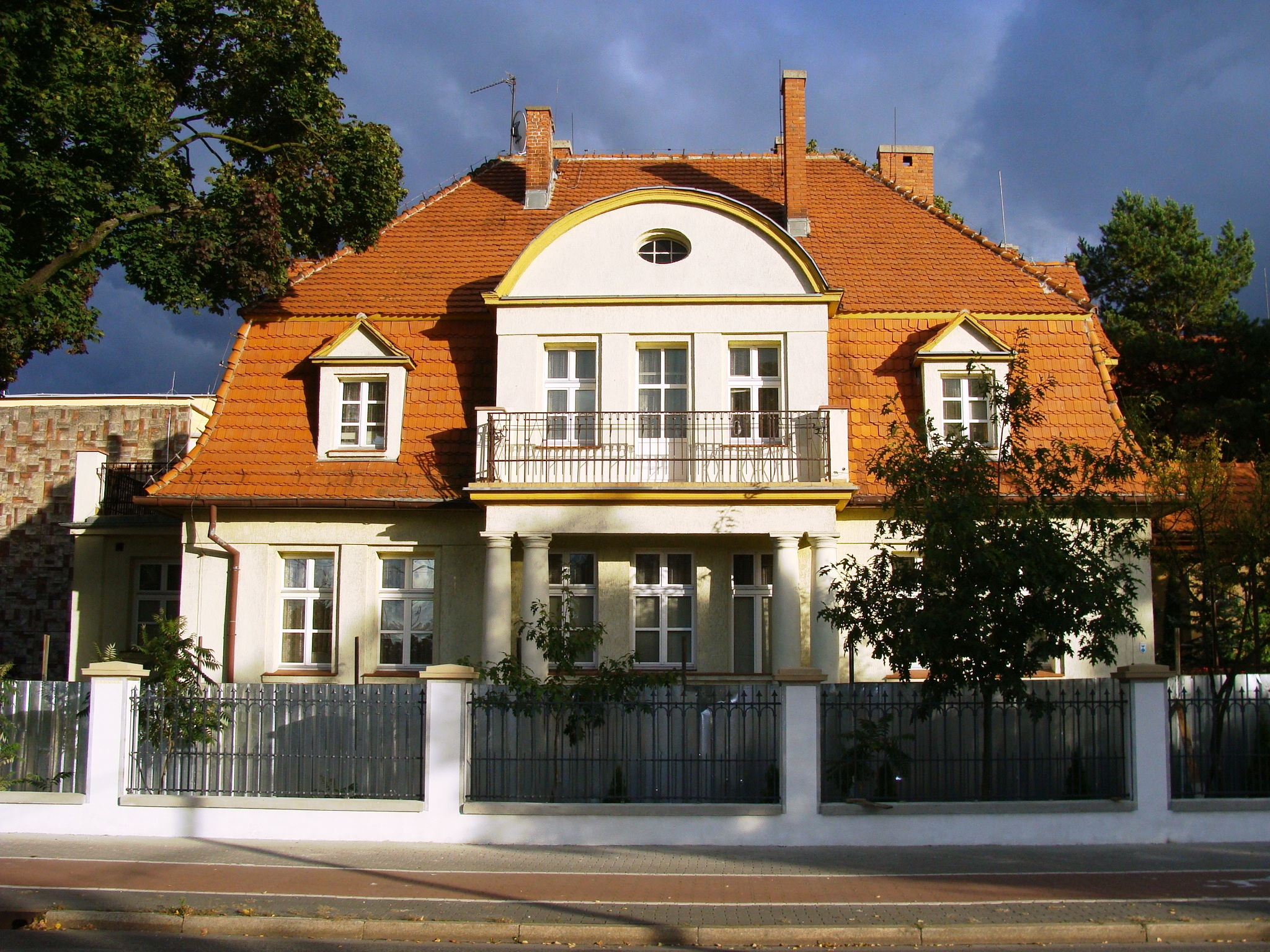
Willa Komendanta

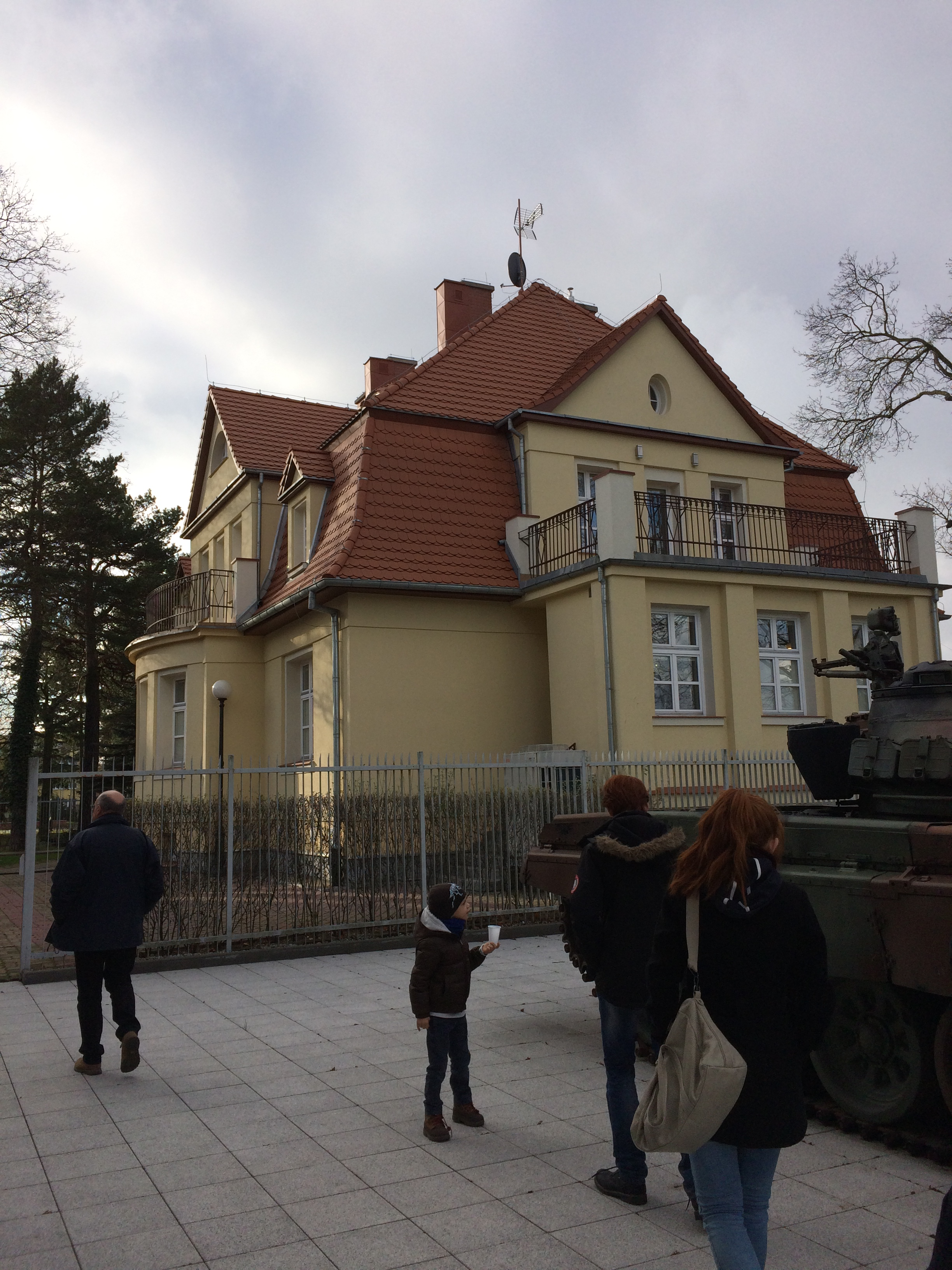
Commander's house

== See also ==
- Bydgoszcz
- Gdanska Street in Bydgoszcz
- (in Polish) Downtown district in Bydgoszcz

== Bibliography ==
- (in Polish) Załuska, Jan (1924). Wielkopolska Szkoła Podchorążych Piechoty. Szkic historyczny z 55-ma ilustracjami. Bydgoszcz: Zakłady Graficzne Instytutu Wydawniczego "Biblioteka Polska".
- (in Polish) Bręczewska-Kulesza Daria, Derkowska-Kostkowska Bogna, Wysocka A. (2003). Ulica Gdańska. Przewodnik historyczny. Bydgoszcz: Wojewódzki Ośrodek Kultury w Bydgoszczy. ISBN 8386970103.
- (in Polish) Derenda, Jerzy (2006). Piękna stara Bydgoszcz – tom I z serii Bydgoszcz miasto na Kujawach. Bydgoszcz: Towarzystwo Miłośników Miasta Bydgoszczy.
- (in Polish) Umiński, Janusz (1996). Bydgoszcz – przewodnik. Bydgoszcz: Regionalny Oddział PTTK "Szlak Brdy" w Bydgoszczy. ISBN 8390528207.
