= Glinki (Bydgoszcz district) =

District in Bydgoszcz, Poland

Coordinates: 53.1009°N 18.0196°E

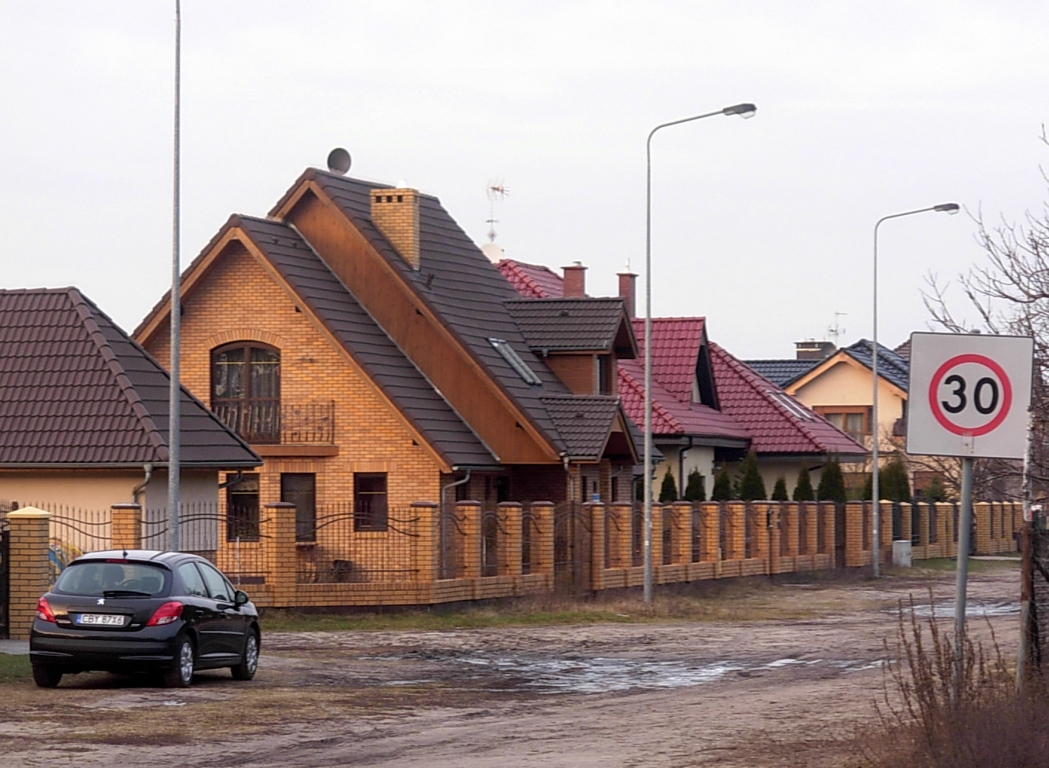
Glinki Bydgoszcz

Glinki is a Bydgoszcz district in the south part of the city. It borders the districts Wzgórze Wolności and Wyżyny. The district name derives from its main street Glinki.
