= Wyżyny, Bydgoszcz =

District in Bydgoszcz

Coordinates: 53.1081°N 18.0339°E

Wyżyny is a district in Bydgoszcz, Poland.

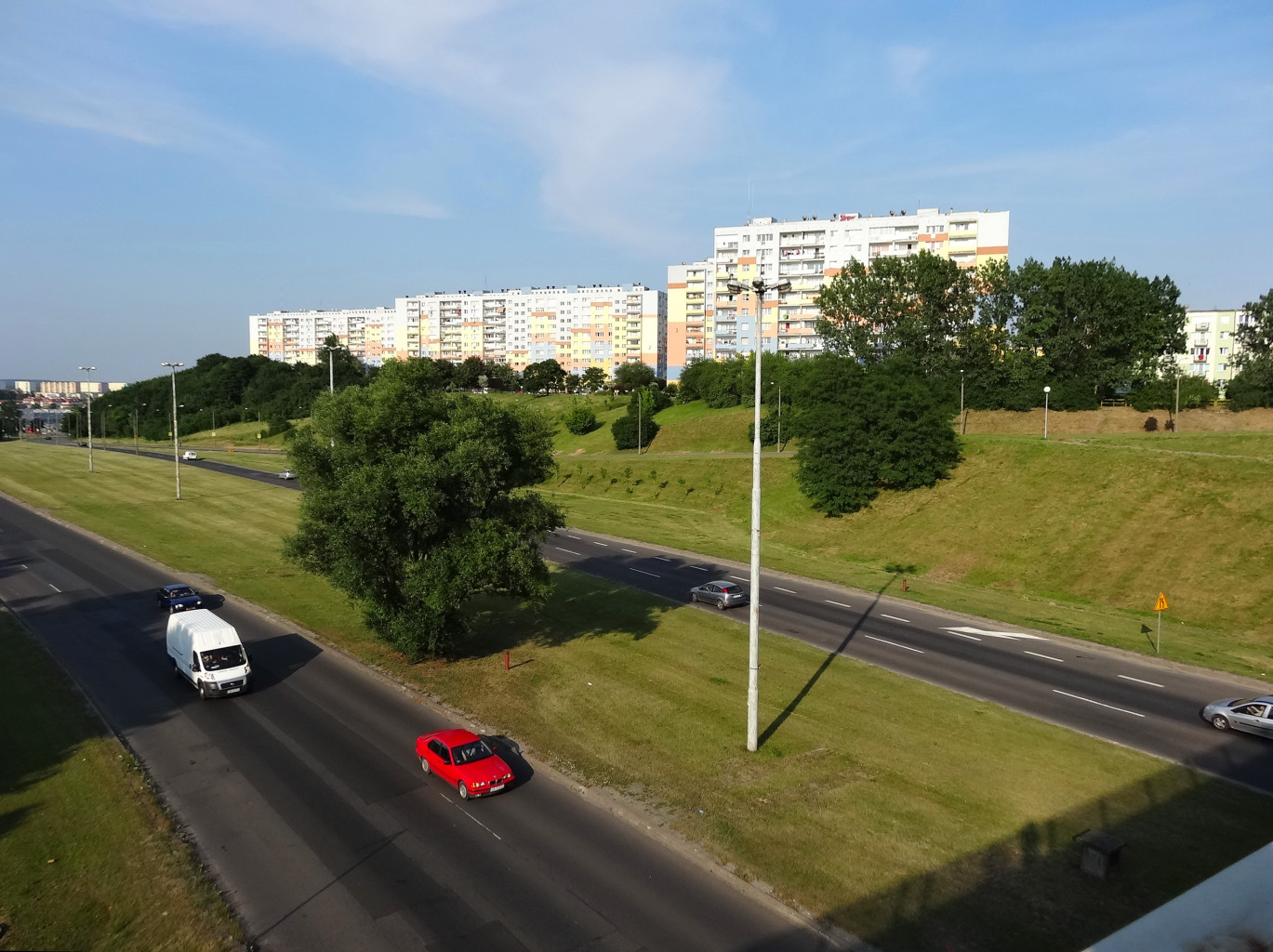
Wyżyny

== History ==
Construction was started in the Wyżyny district on 3 May 1971. The development was intended to house around 60,000 inhabitants and was completed in 1982. Its main architect was Andrzej Modrzejewski.

== Public buildings ==
- Church of the Holy Polish Brothers Martyrs
- Church Matki Bożej Fatimskiej
- Church Sacred Joseph
- "Perła" pool
- Chemik Bydgoszcz Stadium

Schools

- Elementary school number 25
- Junior High number 16
- I.J.Paderewski Junior High number 17
- Synów Pułków Junior High number 38
- High school number 9

== Main streets ==
- Pope John Paul II
- Glinki
- Szpitalna
- Bełzy
- Perłowa
- Polish Army
