= Tadeusz Nowakowski =

Polish journalist, politician, dissident, 20th century

- Born: 8 November 1917; Allenstein, German Empire
- Died: 11 March 1996 (aged 78); Bydgoszcz, Poland
- Resting place: Evangelical-Augsburg Cemetery, Bydgoszcz; 53°08′32″N 18°00′18″E
- Known for: Working at Radio Free Europe
- Spouse: Teresa Kiersnowska
- Parents: Stanisław Nowakowski (father); Emilia Gerke (mother)
- Awards

Tadeusz Nowakowski alias Taddy, Wuj Teofil, Tadeusz Olsztyński (1917–1996) was a Polish writer and journalist, Polish activist in exile, Honorary Citizen of the cities of Bydgoszcz, Munich and Olsztyn.

== Life ==
=== Youth ===
Tadeusz Nowakowski was born on 8 November 1917, in Olsztyn, then known as "Allenstein" as part of the German Empire. His father Stanisław was a journalist and national activist. His mother was Emilia Gerke. In 1912 the couple emigrated to the USA arriving on 1 September. However, by 16 June 1913 they returned to Poland and settled in Olsztyn. As a result of the 1920 East Prussian plebiscite, Warmia was granted to the Germans and the Nowakowski family had to leave Olsztyn. In the winter of 1920, they arrived in Bydgoszcz where they lived till 1939: residing first at 15 Podgórna Street in Szwederowo district, they finally settled at 28 Swiętej Trojcy Street.

Tadeusz attended the State High School and Gymnasium at Grodzka Street, where in 1936 he passed his secondary school exam or Matura. Already during his school years, he was writing poems and columns for the school magazine "Ogniwa" and for the local paper "Dziennik Bydgoski". Additionally, he collaborated with "Polskie Radio Pomorza i Kujaw" (Radio PiK) (English: Polish Radio of Kujawsko-Pomorskie), a local branch of the national network which just opened in one of the hall of the Municipal Theatre of Bydgoszcz.

During his junior high school period, he was active as a scout, as he belonged to the "Jan Kiliński" 4th Bydgoszcz Scout Team, also called "Bydgoszcz Blue Four" (Polish: Błękitna Czwórka Bydgoski). In 1938, Tadeusz started studies at the Polish philology department of the University of Warsaw, which were interrupted by the outbreak of World War II on 1 September 1939.

=== World War II ===
During the conflict, Nowakowski participated as a volunteer in the Polish campaign. Together with the 14th Kujavian Infantry Regiment stationed in Włocławek, he went on a combat trail to the besieged capital.

Fortunately, he could avoid captivity and returned to settle in Włocławek, where his family had already moved to after Tadeusz's father arrest. There, on 28 February 1941, he was arrested by the Gestapo on charges of belonging to a secret organization and editing a Polish newspaper. In 1942, he was sentenced to death by a German court; the sanction was later commuted to a 30 years imprisonment. He served this sentence in several prisons and camps: Włocławek, Inowrocław, Bautzen, Zwickau, Dresden, Vogelsang, and finally Salzwedel.

Released in the spring of 1945 by Allied forces, Tadeusz found himself in the British occupation zone of Germany. He stayed in Haren, in a camp for Polish displaced persons of the Polish occupation zone in Germany under the administration of the Polish government-in-exile, near the German-Dutch border. In this place, he found a job as a teacher in a Polish high school. Trying to move out of this position, Nowakowski went to Italy in autumn of 1946, where he joined Władysław Anders's Polish II Corps, which ended its combat trail there. He then waited his resettlement to Great Britain.

=== Life in exile during PRL period ===
In 1946, he transferred to London. Very active among the community of the Poles abroad, he worked there with Polish magazines and the Polish section of the BBC.

He initiated a collaboration with Radio Free Europe when the main station was still in New York City: three times a week he was sending his cultural commentary and correspondence to the US for the Free Europe newsletter. Logically, in 1952, he became the editor of the new Polish department of Radio Free Europe established in Munich. As a consequence, Nowakowski moved to live in the Bavarian capital in 1953.

At Radio Free Europe, he was responsible for literature and cultural questions. Having taken the pseudonym of Tadeusz Olsztyński, he ran, among others, the show "Panorama dnia" (Panorama of the day) and weekly chats "Przy kawiarnianym stoliku" (At the café table). He was famous for his extraordinary storytelling skills and improvisation on the air.

As a writer, Nowakowski made his debut in 1948, with a volume of war stories "Szopa za jasminami" (A shed behind the jasmines), where the author recollected his prison experiences and memories from Bydgoszcz. In 1957, he gained fame and recognition with the novel "Obóz Wszystkich Świętych" (Camp of All Saints). The book was translated into 8 languages and received highly favourable critics, in particular in the New York Times.

He additionally penned:

- a collection of short stories (e.g. "Aleja dobrych znajomych" – Avenue of good friends or "Niestworzenie Rzeczy" – Uncreated things in 1968);
- several novels and poems;
- "The Radzziwills" (Polish: Saga rodu Radziwiłłów), a saga retracing the history of the Radziwiłł family, published in 1966 exclusively in West Germany and the United States.

As a reporter for Radio Free Europe, Tadeusz covered 30 Pope John Paul II's pilgrimages. As such, he witnessed Mehmet Ali Ağca's attempted assassination of Pope John Paul II in 1981. His reportages were eventually gathered and published in six books, earning him the nickname of "Pope's reporter" (Polish: reporter Papierza). Nowakowski also reported for Radio Free Europe on the trials of war criminals, especially the twenty-month long Frankfurt Auschwitz trials (1963–1965). He also established extensive contacts with the literary and artistic world in Germany. He was an associate of the daily Frankfurter Allgemeine Zeitung, published articles in Die Zeit and collaborated with the Bavarian radio.

While focusing on literary works, he did not shy away from actively participating in the social life of the Polish community in Munich. He was a member of the following associations, among others:

- "Union of Polish Writers Abroad" ('Polish: Związek Pisarzy Polskich na Obczyźnie);
- "World Union of Poles" (Polish: Światowy Związek Polaków z Zagranicy);
- "Mieczysław Grydzewski Academy";
- "Group 47";
- "Bavarian Academy of Fine Arts".

In 1974, he co-signed with 14 other Polish exiles the "List 15" (Letter 15), an open letter flagging up the situation of Poles in the Soviet Union, sent to Józef Tejchma, then communist Deputy Prime Minister of the Polish People's Republic. The missive had been written by Zbigniew Herbert and Zygmunt Mycielski and co-signed, among others, by Andrzej Kijowski, Tadeusz Konwicki, Edward Lipiński, Antoni Słonimski, Andrzej Szczypiorski or Włodzimierz Zonn.

On the political side, Tadeusz Nowakowski became in 1979 a member of the National Council of the Republic of Poland. For many years he was a representative in West Germany of the Polish government-in-exile in London. Additionally, he chaired the Association for the German-Polish Agreement in Munich and was active in the political emigration group "Polski Ruch Wolnościowy Niepodległość i Demokracja" (Polish Freedom Movement Independence and Democracy). Finally, he was a member of the "Jan Nowak-Jeziorański's Association of Employees, Collaborators and Friends of the Polish Broadcasting Station of Radio Free Europe" (Polish: Stowarzyszenie Pracowników, Współpracowników i Przyjaciół Rozgłośni Polskiej Radia Wolna Europa Imienia Jana Nowaka-Jeziorańskiego).

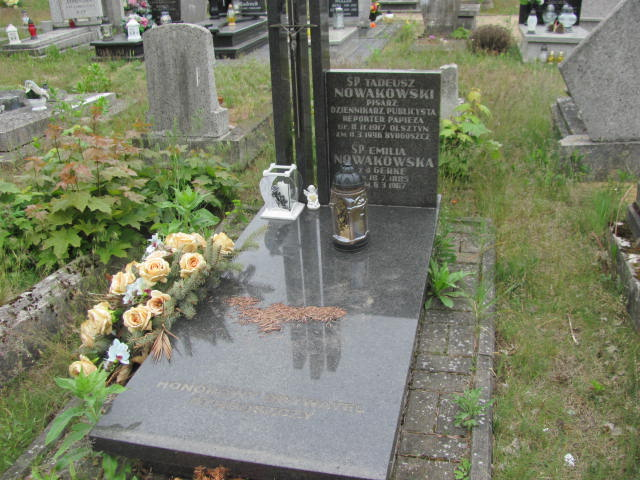
Tadeusz Nowakowski and his mother's tombstones

=== Post communist Poland ===
In 1990, after returning from exile, Nowakowski set up the association "World Union of Bydgoszcz residents" (Polish: Światowy Związek Bydgoszczan) and was its first president (1992).

In the spring of 1995, he settled down permanently in Bydgoszcz. Heavily suffering from diabetes, Tadeusz Nowakowski passed away in this city on 11 March 1996. The funeral ceremony was attended by Jan Wiktor Nowak, then Auxiliary bishop of the Archdiocese of Gniezno: it took place in the parish church of the Holy Cross.

According to his wishes, he was buried next to his mother, from Evangelical faith, in the Evangelical-Augsburg Cemetery of Bydgoszcz.

== Family ==
- Tadeusz's father, Stanisław Nowakowski, was born on 21 September 1889, in Śrem, then Schrimm, part of the German Empire, from Adam, a shoemaker, and Marianna née Kierblewska. Stanisław was a Polish national, an ardent activist during the 1920 plebiscite and a journalist in Warmia and Pomerania. He mainly collaborated with the editorial office of Gazeta Olsztyńska. After his arrival in Bydgoszcz in 1920, he soon became editor of the local paper "Dziennik Bydgoski". In January 1940, he was arrested by the Nazi Gestapo and sent to Dachau concentration camp. He died there two years later, on 24 June 1942.
- Tadeusz Nowakowski married Teresa Kiersnowska in 1945. They had a son Krzysztof, born in 1946, in London and divorced afterwards. Krzystof currently (2022) lives in the United Kingdom.
- Tadeusz had a second wife, Danuta Anczakowska, whom he married in 1958, while working in Munich. From this union the couple had a son, Marek Rafael, born in 1967, in the United Kingdom.
- Marek Rafael studied journalism and management studies in the United States. He is a journalist and former ABC News correspondent in the Middle East. Today working as a communications and investor relations specialist, he lives between the United Arab Emirates and Germany (Munich).

== Works ==
=== Main prose books ===
- Szopa za jaśminami (A shed behind the jasmines) (1948);
- Panna z drugiego piętra (The miss from the second floor) (1951);
- Obóz Wszystkich Świętych (Camp of All Saints) (1957);
- Syn zadżumionych (The son of the Plagued-stricken) (1959), a title in reference to "Ojciec zadżumionych" (The father of the Plagued-stricken) by major Polish writer Juliusz Słowacki (1809–1949);
- Saga rodu Radziwiłłów (The Radzziwills) (1966);
- Niestworzone rzeczy. Zbiór opowiadań (Uncreated things. Collection of stories) (1968);
- Happy-end (1970);
- Byle do wiosny (Until spring) (1975), a satirical novel taking place in Włocławek;
- Wiza do Hrubieszowa (Visa to Hrubieszów) (1979);
- Nie umiera się w Miami (You don't die in Miami) (1991);
- Urzeczenie (Captivation) (1993);

=== Poetry ===
A collection of his poems entitled "Za kurtyną snu..." (Behind the curtain of sleep...) was released in 2003.

=== Reportages ===
Pope John Paul II's travels:

- Reporter Papieża (Pope's reporter) (1980);
- W bagażniku Jego Świątobliwości (In His Holiness's trunk) (1981);
- Volo papale (Pope's flight) (1982);
- Na skrzydłach nadziei (On the wings of hope) (1984);
- Boeing św. Piotra (Saint Peter's Boeing) (1986);
- Kwiaty dla Pielgrzyma (Flowers for the Pilgrim) (1987).

Others:

- Aleja Dobrych Znajomych (Avenue of good friends) (1968);
- Osiem dni w Ojczyźnie (Eight days at home) (1985). "Marek" as author's name was printed by mistake by the publisher on the title page.

== Collaborators ==
During his work at Radio Free Europe in Munich, Tadeusz Nowakowski cooperated (interviews, symposiums, meetings) with many influent characters, among whom, Lech Wierczyński, Paweł Zaremba, Aleksandra Stypułkowska, Aleksander Menhard, Jerzy Kosiński, Richard von Weizsäcker, Stanisław Załuski, Janusz Reiter or Alina Perth-Grabowska.

== Awards ==
- Order of Polonia Restituta
  - Knight's Cross;
  - Officer's Cross (13 July 1978) by the Government of the Republic of Poland in Exile;
  - Commander's Cross (11 November 1990) by the Republic of Poland;
  - Commander's Cross with a Star in 1993, by the President of the Republic of Poland.
- Award of the "Władysław and Nella Turzański Foundation" (Polish: Nagroda Fundacji Władysława i Nelli Turzańskich), in 1990, for "special achievements in the field of Polish culture".
- Recipient of the Order of the Smile (Polish: Order Uśmiechu).
- Honorary Citizen of the cities of Bydgoszcz (27 September 1993), Munich and Olsztyn (1991).

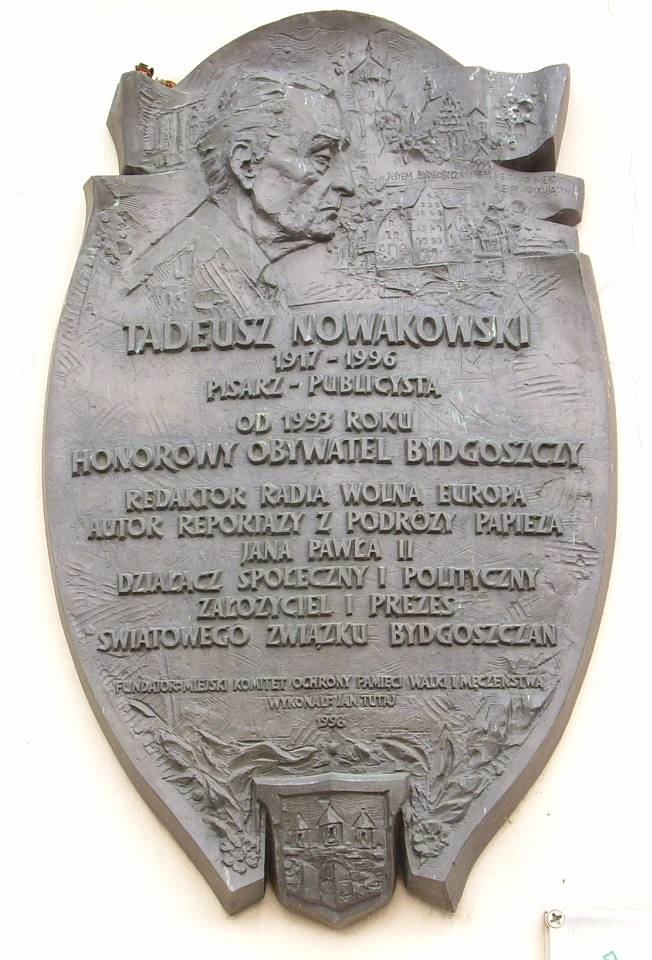
Commemorative plaque on Stary Rynek

== Commemorations ==
- On 27 June 1996, the Tadeusz Nowakowski Memorial Chamber was inaugurated in the Church of the Holy Polish Brothers Martyrs in Bydgoszcz. In this place, numerous mementoes of the writer are collected.
- In 1998, a commemorative plaque has been unveiled in Bydgoszcz at 3 Stary Rynek.
- A walking lecture in Bydgoszcz recalling Nowakowski's places in the city took place on 6 October 2017. It was organized by cultural municipal agencies, schools and the Kazimierz Wielki University in Bydgoszcz.
- An exhibition took place in the Governor's Office of the Kuyavian-Pomeranian Voivodeship in Jagiellońska Street, Bydgoszcz, from 22 November, to December 4, 2017, on the occasion of the 100th anniversary of Nowakoswki's birth.
- Since 19 January 2018, Tadeusz Nowakowski is the patron of High school Nr. IX in Bydgoszcz. The ceremony happened in presence of the journalist's younger son Marek Rafael, while his older son, Krzysztof, living in Great Britain, attended remotely. Since then, the High School has been organizing annually a Provincial Literary Competition named after its patron. It is opened to all students of the Kuyavian-Pomeranian Voivodeship.
- A square in the Szwederowo district of Bydgoszcz bears the name of the journalist. Renovated in 2020, it lies between Orla and Księdza Ignacego Skorupki streets and display a Monumental cross (1935) and a fountain "Children playing with fish" (1934).

== Anecdotes with Pope John Paul II ==
- In November 1980, while reporting for Radio Free Europe on the papal arrival in Cologne airport, Nowakowski mentioned that the pope had kissed the German soil. He immediately added a spontaneous, personal comment. He reminded that when the Pope, visiting Poland, kissed his native land in greeting, he did it as if it were mother's hands, "and here [in Cologne] he kisses as if it were mother-in-law's hands." "I thought no one would hear it," recalled Nowakowski. However, he soon became convinced that "the pope sees everything and hears everything." Seeing "his reporter" some time later, John Paul II waved his finger at him and said: "Mr. Tadeusz, the Pope has no mother-in-law."
- Nowakowski spent hundreds of hours with John Paul II on the plane during the 33 foreign trips that the Pope made in the first half of his pontificate. Tadeusz's older son Marek recalls: John Paul II sometimes entered the part of the plane intended for journalists, looking for my father there and with a friendly gesture of his hand invited to him: "Tadziu, come, tell me new jokes from Poland."

== See also ==
- Bydgoszcz
- Szwederowo district, Bydgoszcz
- Radio Free Europe/Radio Liberty

== Bibliography ==
- (in Polish) Błażejewski, Stanisław; Kutta, Janusz; Romaniuk, Marek (1998). Bydgoski Słownik Biograficzny. Tom V. Bydgoszcz: Kujawsko-Pomorskie Towarzystwo Kulturalne. pp. 83–86.
- (in Polish) Szadkowska, Ewelina (2003). Przeciw dziennikarskiej "pańszczyźnie". Proza Tadeusza Nowakowskiego (PDF). Warszawa: Acta Universitatis Lodziensis. Folia Litteraria Polonica.
- (in Polish) Walczak, Emilia (2017). Czytanki miejskie: zeszyt 6. Po drodze z Tadeuszem Nowakowskim. Spacerownik. Bydgoszcz: Miejskie Centrum Kultury w Bydgoszczy. pp. 83–86. ISBN 9788364942129.
- (in Polish) Walczak, Emilia (2018). Czytanki miejskie: zeszyt 7. Między traumą a urzeczeniem: mechanika pamięci w pisarstwie Tadeusza Nowakowskiego. Bydgoszcz: Miejskie Centrum Kultury w Bydgoszczy. pp. 83–86. ISBN 9788364942136.
- (in Polish) Czachorowska, Magdalena; Guzek, Mariusz (2019). Tadeusz Nowakowski - bydgoszczanin, dziennikarz, emigrant. Bydgoszcz: Wydawnictwo uniwersytetu Kazimierza Wielkiego. pp. 83–86. ISBN 9788380182684.
