= Szwederowo district, Bydgoszcz =

Coordinates: 53°6′50″N 17°59′35″E

Szwederowo district Polish: Szwederowo osiedle w Bydgoszczy
- City district
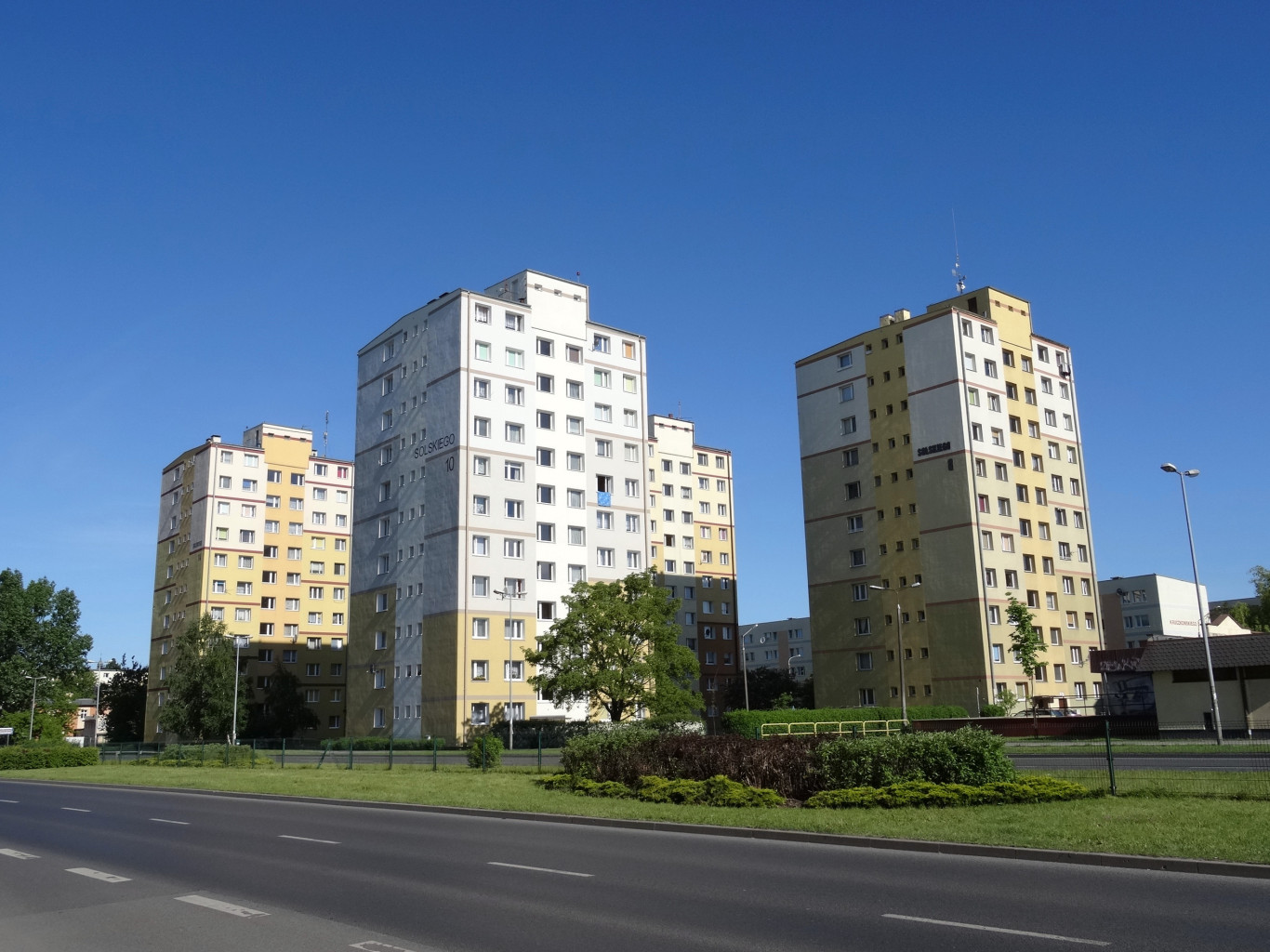
- Towers at Ludwika Solskiego street
- Bydgoszcz coat of arms
- Etymology: Swedes (German: Schwedenhöhe)
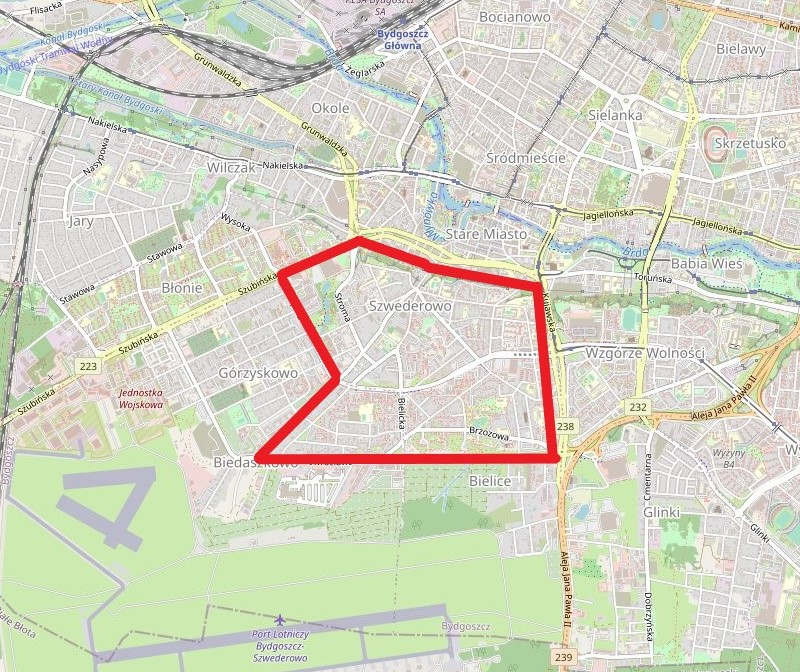
- Delimitation of Szwederowo district
- Country: Poland
- Voivodeship: Kuyavian-Pomeranian Voivodeship
- City: Bydgoszcz
- Established: 1859-1920

Area
  - Total: 236 km^{2} (91 sq mi)
- Elevation: 68 m (223 ft)

Population (Dec 2012)
  - Total: 32 760
  - Density: 13/km^{2} (34/sq mi)

Szwederowo is a district of the city of Bydgoszcz, Poland, located on its southern territory. Szwederowo population is the second largest of all Bydgoszcz districts.

== Location ==
Szwederowo district borders the following districts:

- Old Town to the north, subsuming a part of the southern hill chain of Bydgoszcz;
- Górzyskowo and Błonie to the west;
- Wzgórze Wolności to the east, along Kujawska street;
- Biedaszkowo and Bielice to the south.

In geomorphological terms, the district lies within the Toruńsko-Eberswaldzka urstromtal, in the Kotlina Toruńska mesoregion and the City of Bydgoszcz microregion, i.e. a terrace 68 metres (223 ft) to 70 metres (230 ft) above sea level.

The actual district includes fragments of suburban municipalities incorporated into Bydgoszcz territory between the second half of the 19th century and 1920.

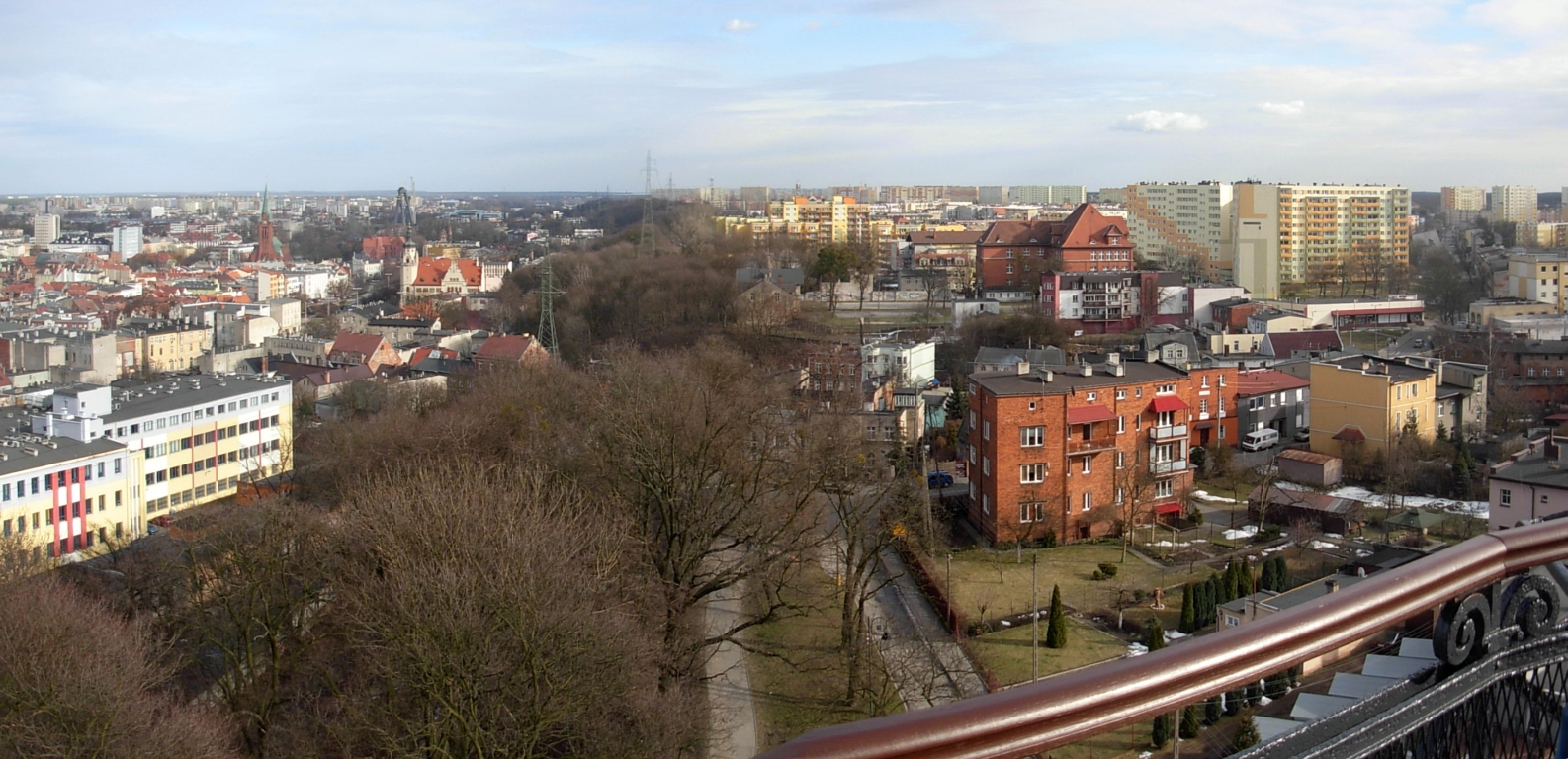
Panoramic view of the northern edge of Szwederowo district

== Etymology ==
The name Szwederowo comes from Swedes, or Schwedenhöhe in German. Indeed, Swedish armies attacked Bydgoszcz during the Swedish Deluge in 1656, from the very hills of today's district. Swedish military engineer Erik Dahlbergh depicted the view of the Swedish troops looking over Bydgoszcz from the Szwederowa hills on a 1657 sketch.

The name also refers to a legend published in 1935 by editor Wincenty Sławiński in a book called Babia Wieś, from the suburban legends of old Bydgoszcz (Polish: Babia Wieś, z legend podmiejskich starej Bydgoszczy). As the story goes, during the Swedish Deluge, Poles strived to resist the invader by all means. On the southern hills opposite the Wool Market square, a band of 200 Swedish partisans camped, nearby a tavern called Swedes. One day, they were all disarmed and captured in their sleep by townspeople, then later carted and sent to the Baltic Sea. This place was named at that time Szwederow and remains as such to this day.

Through the 19th and the 20th century, the district bore the following names:

- (in German) Sweiderowo from 1789;
- (in German) Schwedenberg in 1818;
- (in German) Schwederowo in 1860;
- (in Polish) Szwederowo since 1920.

== History ==
=== Polish period (before 1772) ===
Studies have located the existence of two 11th century-hillforts in Bydgoszcz:

- the Bydgoszcz stronghold was situated at the place where the city castle was erected in the 14th century (between present day Kościelecki Square and Grodzka Street);
- a second stronghold is supposed to have stood on the hills of today's Szwederowo district.

Szwederowo's settlement appeared in the early 16th century, as a minor village of the city parish. During the Swedish Deluge, invading units were stationed there, as described on Erik Dahlbergh's sketches from 1657.

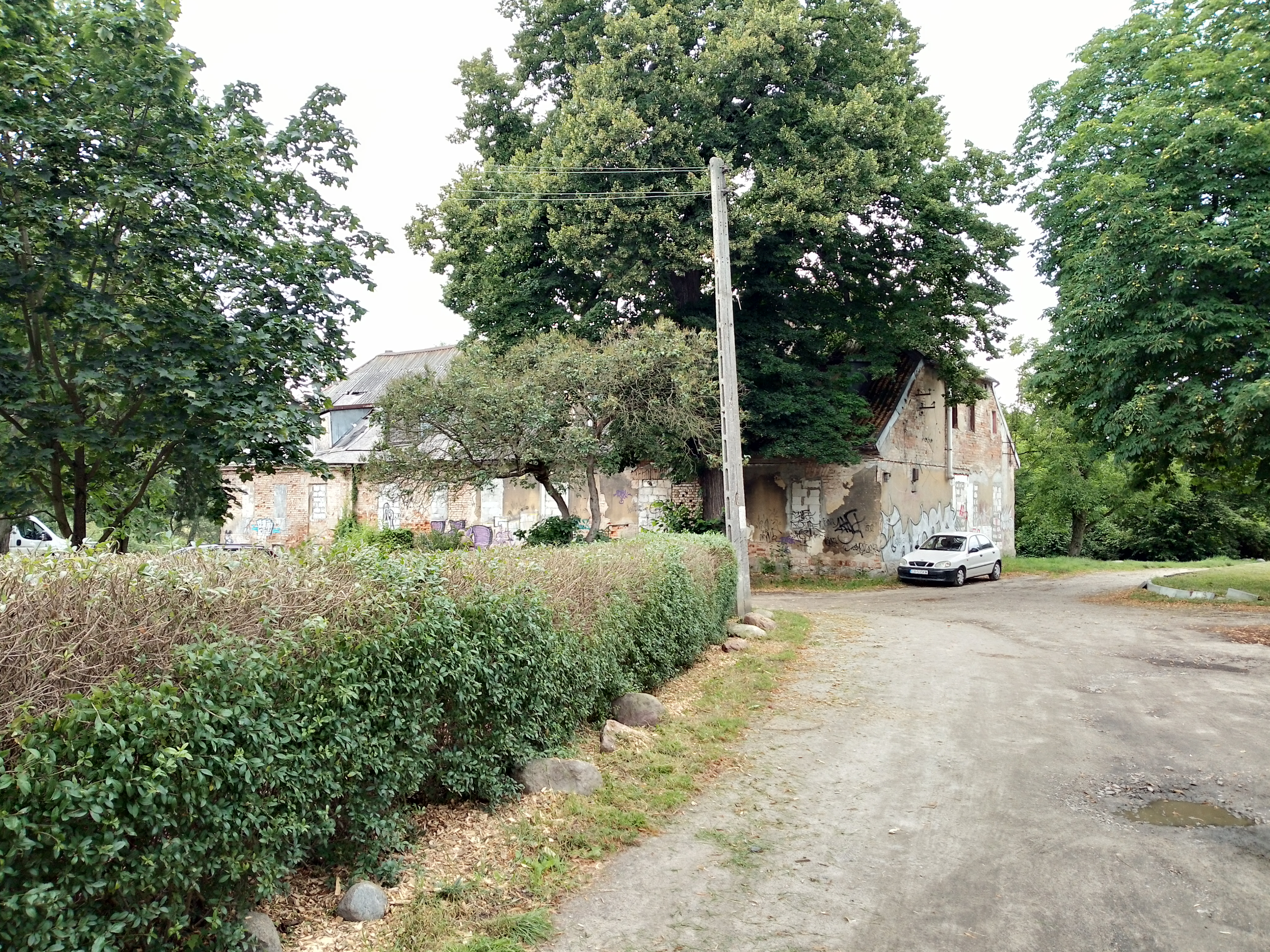
Old manor house at 66 Orla street

Settlements and villages in today's Szwederowo district welcomed a portion of colonizing Olęders in the 17th and 18th centuries: Bielice (nowadays a district of Bydgoszcz) was the first village to receive such settlers before 1660. During the first half of the 18th century, the city of Bydgoszcz promoted further settlements, in a search to recover from the disaster caused by successives wars. Thus additional settlers contracts were awarded for nearby villages (Biedaszkowo (1732), Górzyskowo (1733) and Szwederowo (1743)), or renewed for Bielice (1744). Such villages were organized as folwarks and located above meadows and watercourses, in the area between present day airport and the Five ponds valley.

In the middle of the 18th century, Szwederowo was a middle range folwark as far as farm income in Bydgoszcz region is considered. In 1743, city council leased this farm for 40 years to Barbarza and Adam Lasom. At the end of the 18th century, around ten farm-villages were registered in the vicinity of Bydgoszcz: Nowy Dwór ((in German) Gross Neudorff or Neuhof), Nowy Dwór Mały, Nowy Dwór Wielki, Szwederowo, Goryczkowo, Nowy Dwór, Biedaczkowo, Bielice and Bielice Nowe.

In the 16th and 17th centuries fresh water was supplied from the Five ponds valley in Szwederowo down to public municipal wells, using hollowed tree trunks chiseled to fit together.

=== Prussian period (1774-1920) ===
In the 19th century, Szwederowo farm-village occupied an area within today's following streets: Orla, Kujawska, Brzozowa and Nowa. The abutting farm Nowy Dwór was demarcated by Nowodworska, Nowa and Ugory streets. From 1850 on, a suburban area already bore the name of (in German) Schwedenberg, comprising New Szwederowo (German: Schwedenthal, Polish: Szwederowo Nowe) and Old Szwederowo (German: Schwedenhoche, Polish: Szwederowo Stare).

Under Prussian rule, Bromberg city authorities handed out Szwederowo farm for perpetual lease to several senior Prussian officials. They parcelled the area into many properties so as to obtain enough income, thus creating more than 160 new farms between 1818 and 1860. Settlers came from former Polish territories, Prussia, but also from France, living peacefully in the same community.

During the 19th century, thanks to the rapid industrial development of Bromberg, the number of inhabitants in Szwederowo increased dramatically. People worked in majority in city factories, workshops or on the railways. A local census of the region recorded in 1833 that 275 people lived in the village and farm of Schwedenberg (German for Szwederowo): 174 with Evangelical faith, 94 Catholics and 7 Jews in 27 houses. The same study revealed that 60 people (57 Evangelicals, 3 Catholics) lived among 8 houses in the nearby farm of Nowy Dwór ((in German) Neuhoff): in 1858, this 15 hectares (37 acres) farm was incorporated into Bromberg territory. According to a description by Jan Nepomucen Bobrowicz, both Szwederowo and Nowy Dwór belonged in 1846 to the city.

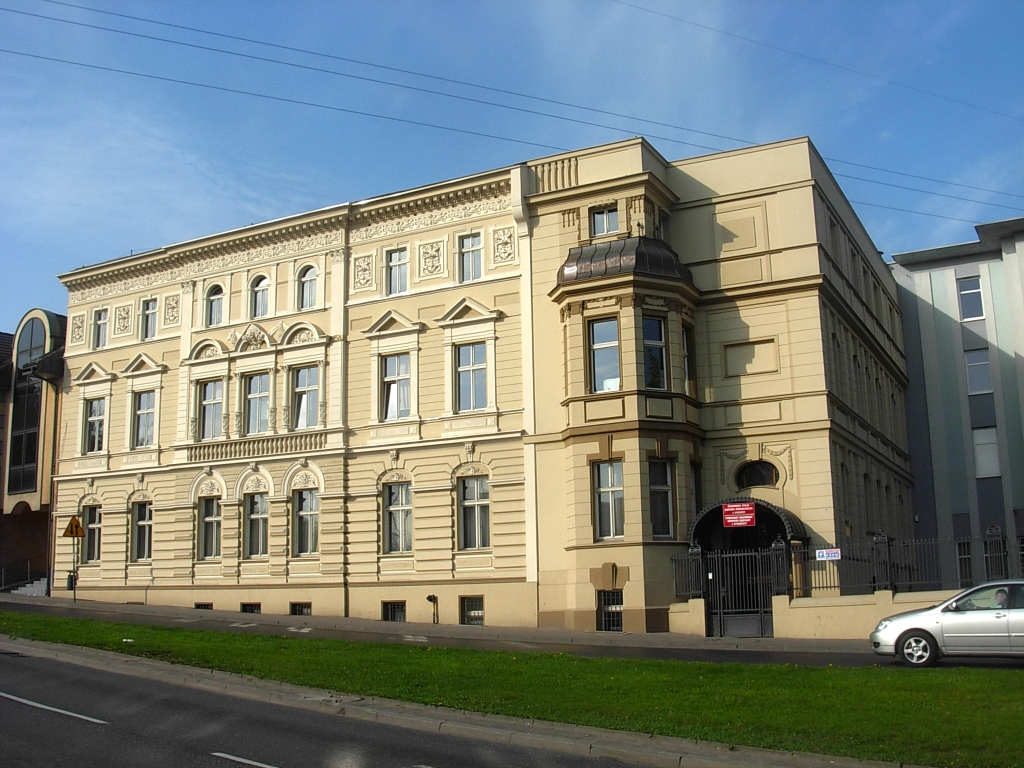
Building at 4 Kujawska street

As mentioned in another census from 1860, two locations coexisted: Old Szwederowo, a 31-houses village with 322 people (167 Evangelicals, 98 Catholics, 57 Jews) and New Szwederowo, a 23-houses hamlet with 229 people (164 Protestants, 65 Catholics). Both places were subsumed under Catholic and Evangelical parishes of Bromberg.

Despite these organic relationships with the main city, Szwederowo and the neighboring villages (Małe Bartodzieje, Okole, Wilczak and Bielawy) formed separate urban bodies outside of the administrative area of Bromberg, leading to a somehow chaotic spatial development. Until the end of the Prussian period, several projects to incorporate these suburban hamlets into the main city territory were drawn, but none was ever carried out.

In the years 1870 to 1910, Szwederowo streets were mostly made up of wooden or brick one-story houses, since the majority of its inhabitants were workers. In 1897, the village was connected to the municipal gasworks grid. According to Prussian statistics, the village gathered the highest concentration of Polish-Catholic population (51%) in the area; conversely, they were only 16.2% living in the center of Bromberg. In 1910, Szwederowo had a population of 8801 people: 4495 speaking Polish, 4161 German and 145 Hebrew.

Large parks have been created during Prussian times, on the edges of the hills overlooking the old town:

- Henryk Dąbrowski Park in 1832, at the initiative of Carl von Wissmann, then president of the administrative region of Bromberg;
- initial schemes of the Aleja Górska in 1890;
- Park on Wolności Hill, Bydgoszcz in 1911–1913.

=== Interwar period (1920-1939) ===
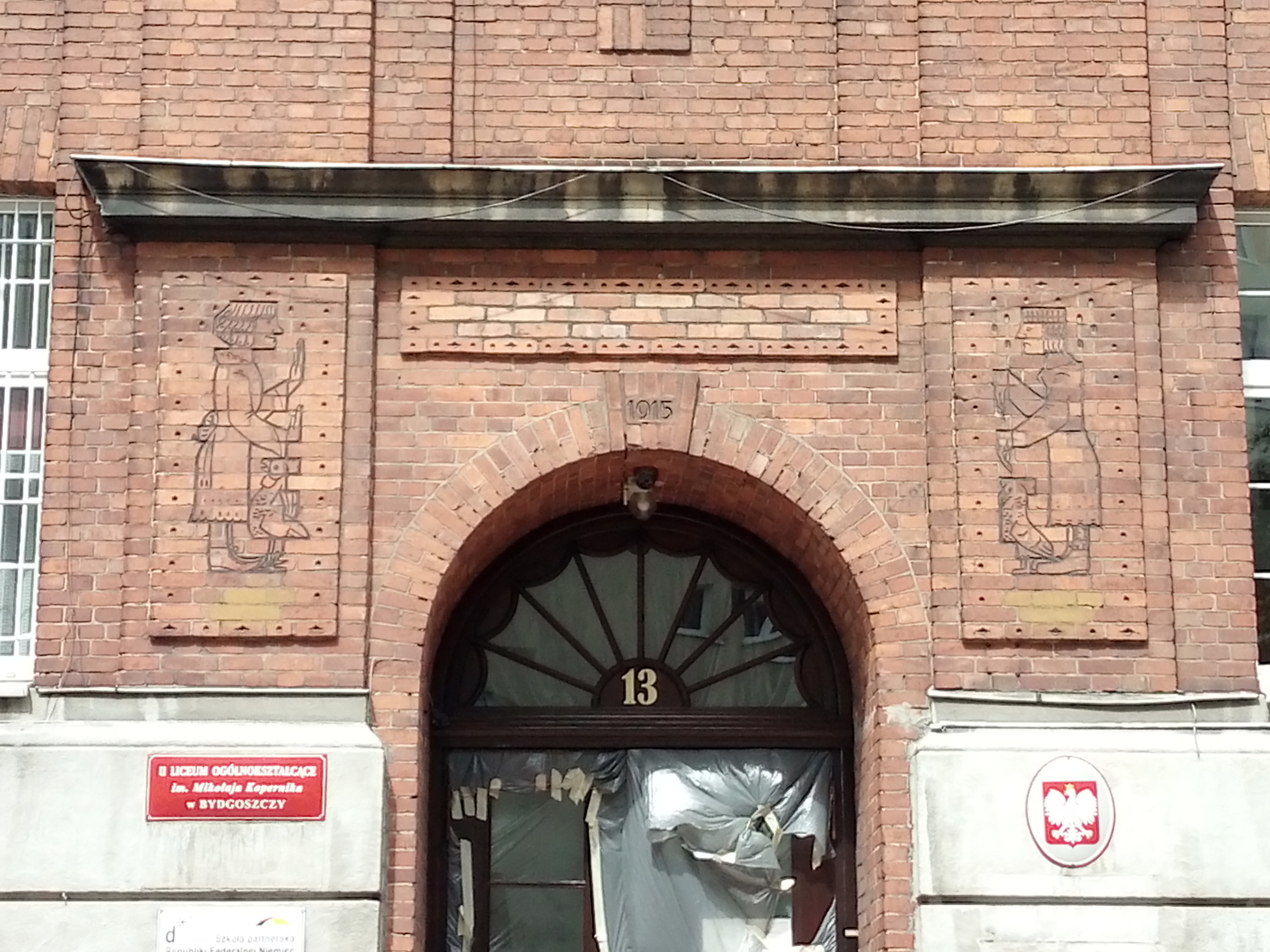
Detail of the portal of the High school Nr.2

After World War I, Szwederowo commune (25,729 hectares (63,580 acres)) has been incorporated into Bydgoszcz territory on April 1, 1920, together with Bielice Nowe (262 hectares (650 acres)), on the south-east east of Szwederowo (between today's Szubińska and Inowrocławska streets). During this period, with a few exceptions, Szwederowo district had a poor housing records. In the 1920s, urban projects were unveiled, in particular aiming at building in the estate a market and new residential houses, but nothing was implemented for financial reasons.

However, some programmes were completed:

- in 1928, the construction of the Church of Our Lady of Perpetual Help;
- in 1927, the 'Bydgoszcz brewery (Polish: Browar Bydgoski);
- in 1928 the City Bath (Polish: Łaźnia Miejska), today a culture and health center.

Two schools operated in Szwederowo, an evangelical-Catholic school (named after Stanisław Leszczyński) and a 7-grade public general school (named after Jan Henryk Dąbrowski), as well as a kindergarten, a care home, an orphanage and a makeshift hospital (Clinic of the Social Insurance Company).

Inhabitants of the district usually went picnicking on Sundays to the so-called Bielicki Forest (Polish: Puszcza Bydgoska), stretching eastward between Bydgoszcz and Toruń, organizing orchestra concerts, gastronomic fêtes and competitions. There, they also picked up fire wood, berries or mushrooms. At the time they moved along Bielicka street from Szwederowo district to the forest: today, the street ends its course at Bydgoszcz airport.

=== Nazi occupation (1939–1945) ===
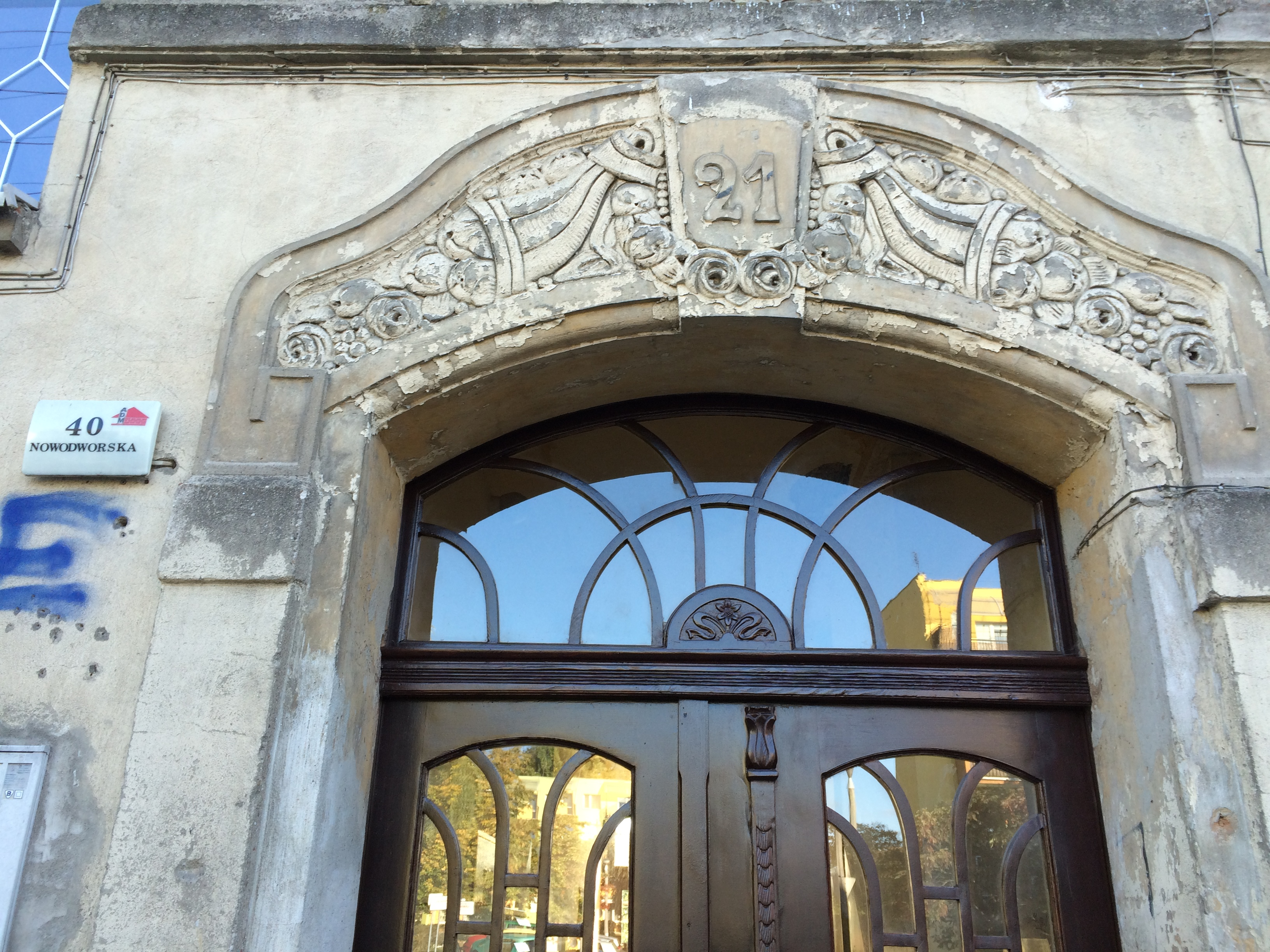
Portal at 40 Nowodworska

During Nazi occupation Szwederowo has experienced a particularly brutal repression campaign. It started with the controversial events of Bydgoszcz Bloody Sunday: on September 3, the Polish army entered the city from the northern forest district (Polish: Las Gdański) and was attacked by saboteurs recruited from among the German minority. One of the heavy fighting place was located in Szwederowo, around Martin Luther's Church (then standing at 42-44 Leszczyńskiego street). As a result, the church burned down and intense skirmishes were carried out on Orla, Bielicka and Żuławy streets, opposing Polish soldiers, citizens' guard and Polish citizens on one side, German citizens and saboteurs on the other.

After seizing the city, Nazi forces investigated the events, while retaliating upon Polish citizens. One of the report mentioned the following regarding Szwederowo:

We have been informed by various Volksdeutsches that an uncertain reliability is to be found in the southern district of the city [i.e. Szwederowo] and still remains to a large extent. Szwederowo was presented as a criminal district where radical elements reside(...).

Among the Polish victims of the sundry roundups and searches performed from September 5 to 30, about 300 residents of Szwederowo are recorded. On the churchyard of Our Lady of Perpetual Help at Ugory street lays a mass grave of 21 murdered Poles detained while leaving the church after a service on Sunday, September 10, 1939.

During this period, the Reich Security Main Office settled in Szwederowo and Nazi Party cells were created in the district. The Nazis liquidated both Jewish cemeteries, the Old one at Henryk Dąbrowski Park (est. 1816) and the New one on Szubińska street (est. 1874). In 1943, a monumental cross standing next to the Church of Our Lady of Perpetual Help was razed by a German tank (it has been rebuilt in 1947).

One of the local Polish resistance movement HQ was located in Szwederowo: at its head was Ludwik Suszyński, aka Sowa. One of its mottos when addressing the Polish government-in-exile was:

In Szwederowo, almost exclusively Polish language is heard. (Polish: W Szwederowie słyszy się prawie wyłącznie język polski.)

=== Post war period (since 1945) ===
After the war, Szwederowo district became a residential district: for several years, its largest industrial plant has been a clothing factory, Modus, at 33 Lenartowicza street.

Alfa a successful firm producing photographic plates, film and photographic papers, founded in 1926 at 3 Garbary Street, was nationalized under the name Foton after WWII: the factory then moved to 13-15 Piękna street.

At the beginning of the 1950s, authorities erected a 25 metres (82 ft) high wooden tower in the eastern part of Henryk Dąbrowski Park in order to jamm Radio Madrid, an anti-communist radio station. In the wake of the Polish October, a spontaneous demonstration burned down this radio jamming contrivance on November 18, 1956. Although perpetrators were victims of repression during the following years, the device was never rebuilt.

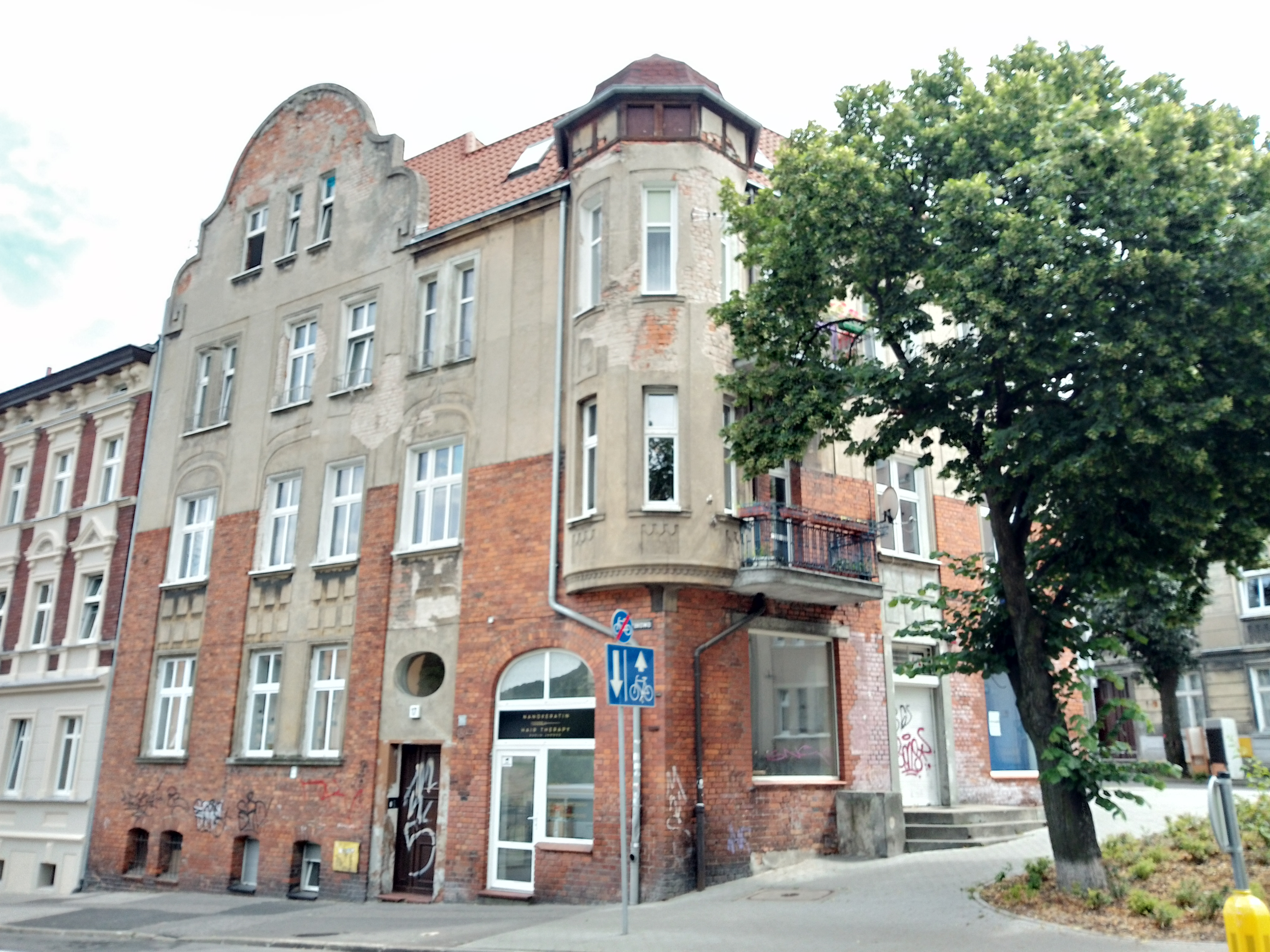
Building at 17 Wiatrakowa street

In 1958, an anti-nuclear shelter with a capacity of 70 people was built for the city authorities at 23a Nowodworska street, along with a 32-meter high tower for communication.

Starting from the late 1950s, the city authorities have been identifying places where to erect large housing projects: a first cluster of 11-storey buildings was constructed in the second half the 1960s in Stroma street, following a typical functionalist design. By the end of the 1960s, additional and larger ensembles were completed, such as the Maria Konopnicka estate accommodating about 3700 people or the housing estate at Ugory street for 1800 residents with modest income. Built using poor quality materials, these housing projects offered modest equipped apartments. At the time, the area of Szwederowo was reclassified for high, multi-family buildings in the new general spatial development plan of 1964, and the project of airport development was finally abandoned.

Under the supervision of architect Janusz Gołębiewski, urban planning works called Miastoprojekt - Bydgoszcz were carried out by the Design and Research Office of General Construction (Polish: Biuro Projektowo-Badawczym Budownictwa). First stage aimed at Szwederowo Południe estate (Southern Szwederowo) edged by Wojska Polskiego, Kujawska and Leszczyńskiego streets. The project intended to build multi-family ensembles with estate greenery, of which 40% comprised 12-storey buildings, along with schools and kindergarten. First edifices were completed in 1977, as part of the Wzgórze Wolności (Freedom Hill) estate.

The next step of the project was the realization of Szwederowo Północ estate (Northern Szwederowo), bordered by Ludwika Solskiego, Kujawska, Leszczyńskiego streets and hills in the north. The concept was developed in 1977 and the technical project was carried out a year later. Construction work began in 1980 with high-rise and five-storey buildings on the vicinity of Nowodworska street. The scheme included the redesign of Kujawska street, the nearby main thoroughfare.

Since the 1980s, the newly built Kujawski roundabout (Polish: Rondo Kujawskie) has been connecting the Aleja Wojska Polskiego in the east to the new housing estates organized under the calling Górny Taras (Bydgoszcz upper terrace). In the 1990s, the path was extended to Piękna street and christened Ludwika Solskiego street, cutting through Szwederowo. In 2007, it has been enlarged to a dual carriageway: future urban plans propose an expansion to the west of the tram line along this axis up to Szubińska street, as the street car network is being extended from Bernardyńska roundabout up to Rondo Kujawskie.

== Main streets ==
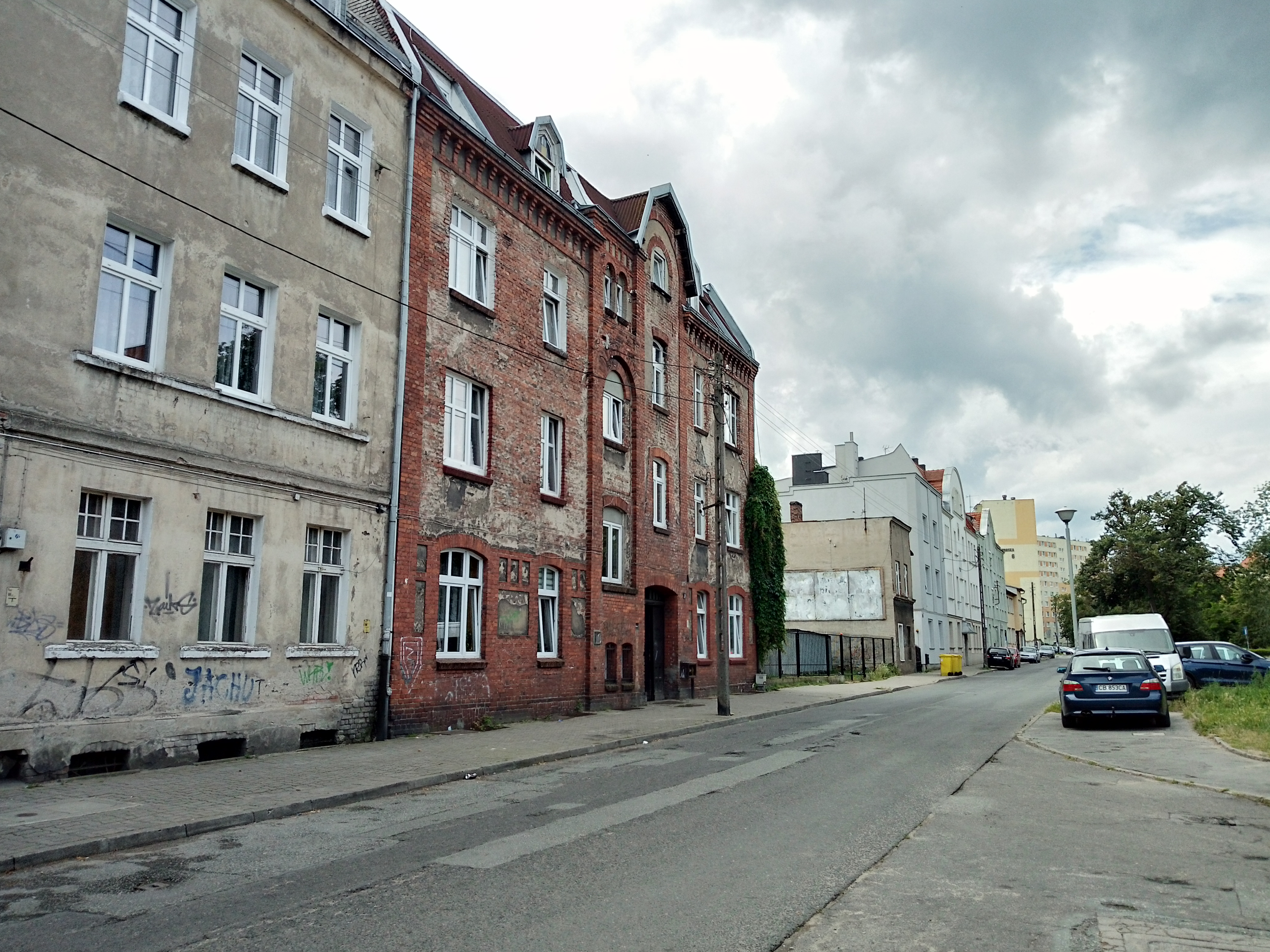
View of Nowodworska street

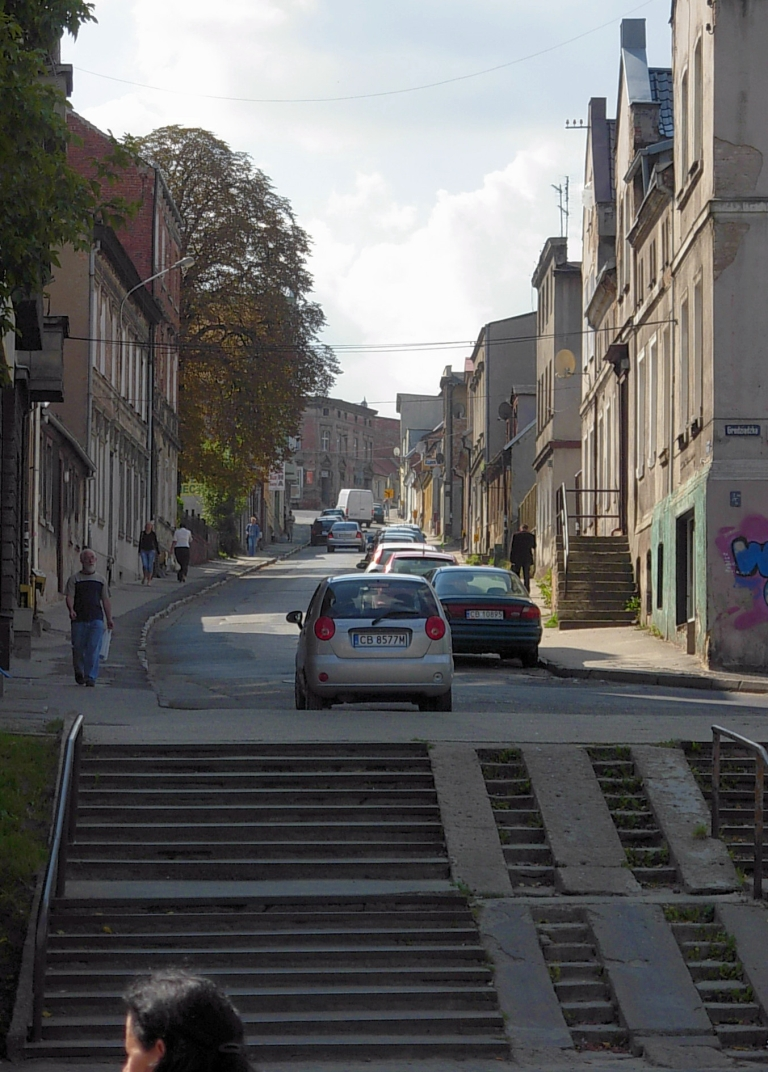
View of Podgórna street

The network of streets in Old Szwederowo dates back to the 18th-19th centuries, created from individual routes connecting barns with each other and with the city center. Principal paths of Szwederowo districts are:

- Bielicka, from Bielice, an early village which became a district of Bydgoszcz in 1920. The street conducted to Bielice Stare farm, standing in the area of today's Bydgoszcz airport. Both Biedaszkowo and Bielice farms were located in the meadows surrounding a rivulet which flowed down to the Brda river. In Biedaszkowo stood an ancient cemetery till 1920;
- Brzozowa, from broza (English: birch). It was a former road to Rupienica and Glinki, with small farms built at the end of the 18th century;
- Antoniego Chołoniewskiego;
- Halicka;
- Jesionowa, from jesion (English: ash (tree));
- Marii Konopnickiej;
- Juliusza Kossaka;
- Kujawska, from Kujawy (English: Kujavia);

The street is an old communication route connecting Bydgoszcz with settlements located in south Kujavia. The road used a ravine in the slope of the Bydgoszcz urstromtal, stretching towards the forest. Along the axis was built in the 13th century Saint Giles church, near the Brda river, probably funded by Casimir I of Kuyavia. In the 17th and 18th centuries, the route connected the town with southern villages such as Rupienica or Glinki. Further on, past the forest, it led to Przyłęki and towards Jezioro Jezuickie (English: Jesuit Lake). In 1920, as Bydgoszcz territory expanded, a dozen of surrounding suburban communes were included in the city borders (including Szwederowo, Bielice and Rupienica): as a consequence, Kujawska street has been running since that year entirely within the municipal administrative boundaries. In the 1980s, the street was thoroughly modernized, widened up to two carriageways with 3 lanes and the large Kujawski roundabout built, with underground passages which were never used, then razed in 2019. The southern segment of Kujawska street was renamed in 2005, Aleja Jana Pawła II in honor of John Paul II.

- Teofila Lenartowicza. The path materialized the border between Bielice and Szwederowo domains;
- Stanisława Leszczyńskiego;
- Nowodworska, from Nowy Dwór a local (15 ha) farm-village settled in the 18th century, integrated in 1858 into Bromberg territory. Several Art Nouveau and modernist style buildings stand there. At Nr 23a is a house housing a shelter from the Cold War;
- Orla street used to be main a road from the city to Górzyskowo farm. An old manor house from these times survived to this day at N°66;
- Piękna (English: beautiful);
- Podgórna (English: At the foot of the hill). At Nr.15, lived the family of Tadeusz Nowakowski, coming from Olsztyn;
- Nowa Sieroca, from sierociniec (English: orphanage);
- Księdza Ignacego Skorupki. The road initially led to Biedaszkowo farm, located on present day Bydgoszcz aeroclub grass field;
- Ludwika Solskiego;
- Stroma (English: steep). At the crossing with Księdza Ignacego Skorupki street, the Kozi Rynek (English: Goat market) used to exist during the interwar period. There were sold dairy products: butter, eggs, cottage cheese and poultry;
- Szubińska, from Szubin, the outskirt village where the avenue led to;
- Szwedzka, from Szwed(ka) (English: Swede);
- Ugory, from ugora (English: fallow). The street was a dirt road connecting farms Górzyskowo (now a Bydgoszcz district) with Rupienica (on today's Park on Wolności Hill). At the beginning of the 20th century, two-storey tenements were built at Ugory street (German: Mietskaserne) for poor people;
- Wiatrakowa, from wiatrak (English: windmill). A city Natural monument has been listed in this street, a common beech named "Justyna".

== Chief distinctive elements ==
=== Greenery ===
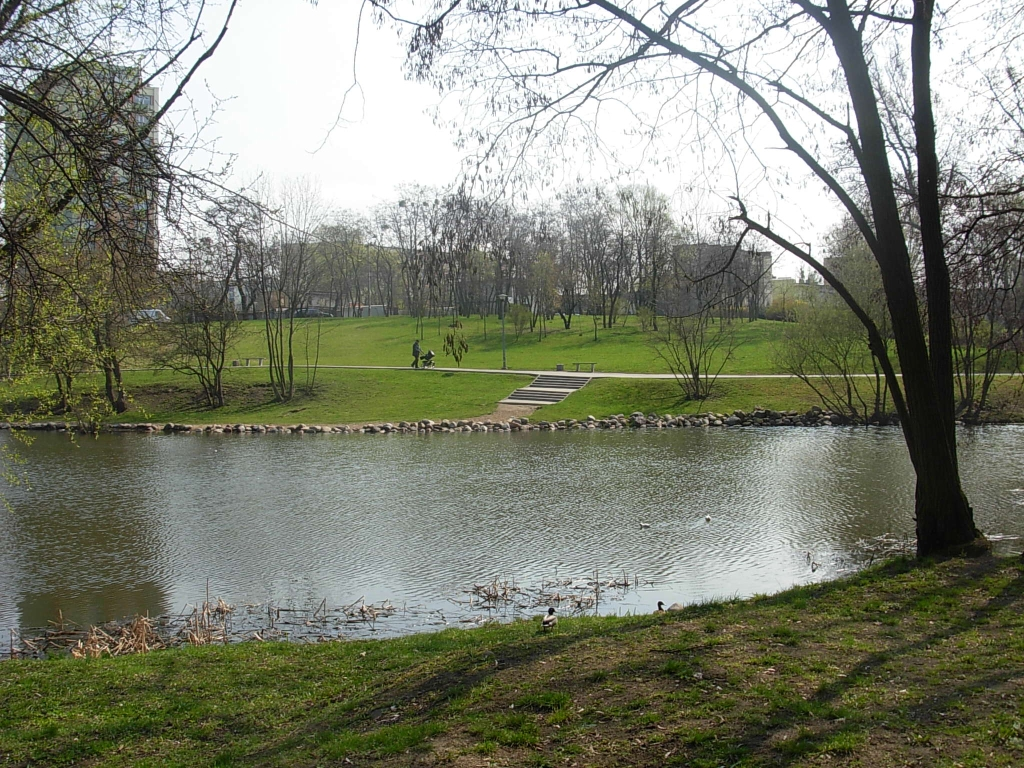
View of the Five ponds valley

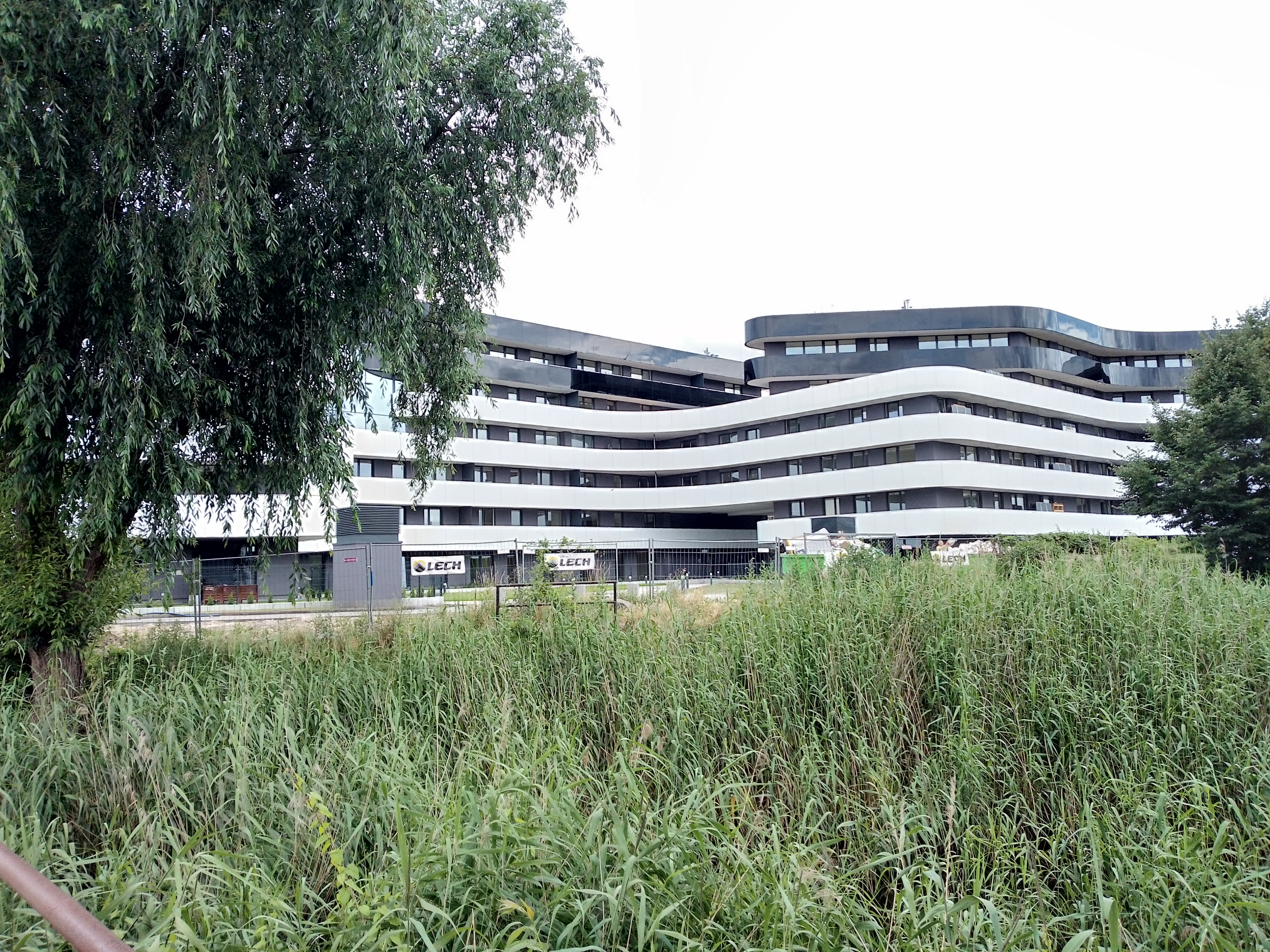
Perłowa Dolina estate at Orla street

Szwederowo district started to develop green domains in the 1830s, with the initiative in 1832 of Carl von Wissmann, then president of the administrative region of Bromberg. In 1900, a water tower was built there, offering an extensive panorama from the top viewing terrace was arranged. In 1920, the park received the name of General Jan Henryk Dąbrowski, who led the capture of Bydgoszcz during the Kościuszko Uprising in 1794.

This park was extended to the east in the 19th century with the creation of the Aleja Górska, built between 1890 and 1940–1942.

The other significant green area in Szwederowo is the so-called Five ponds valley (Polish: Dolina Pięciu Stawów w Bydgoszczy). A watercourse ran there in the Middle Ages and ponds were used for economic and agricultural purposes. In 1523, Bydgoszcz set up its first waterworks, using Brda river flow near Mill Island: a few decades later, this network had to be rebuilt. In 1541, municipal authorities commissioned master Walentem from Bochnia to carry out the construction of a new city waterworks, drinking water intake, with the reservation that water could not be drawn from the Brda river. The engineer used the ponds on the southern hills (then outside of the city) as tanks from which originated by gravity the new water network. Operating 3 metres (9.8 ft) to 5 metres (16 ft) long wooden pipes made from hollow oak trunks linked with metal joints, the grid ran along the following paths: Szubińska street, Poznański square, Poznańska street and Długa street, ending at Zbożowy Rynek (English: Grain market).

The pipe network reached breweries throughout the city, supplying water to public wells and even to some houses. This wooden ensemble lasted about 250 years: at the end of the 18th century, although renovation works started, the waterworks was decommissioned in the 19th century, as the system could not cope with the needs of the growing population.

On this very spot, one can observe today five small water reservoirs, surrounded by streets Piękna, Orla, Stroma and Szubińska. In 2000, negotiations for the construction of a DIY Castorama supermarket in the area specified a proviso related to the funding of a city park close by. Works, completed by 2003, included dredging out 3 ponds and their surroundings (walking paths, shrubbery, hornbeams, maples). In 2007 and 2008, two additional ponds have been created near Orla street. With these additions, the ensemble matches the original 1900s lay out of the greenery.

Since 2003, two housing estates have been erected around the Five ponds valley: Nad Doliną (English: In the Valley) and Perłowa Dolina (English: Valley of the pearl).

The old soviet-time Foton tower still stands in the northern fringe of the park, waiting to be converted.

=== Buildings ===
==== School at 8 Dąbrowskiego street ====
The building boasts historicism forms, a basement, two floors, with an attic covered by a hip roof. Two symmetrical avant-corps stand out. The 1912 superstructure part has been plastered, while the lower levels still display brick façades.

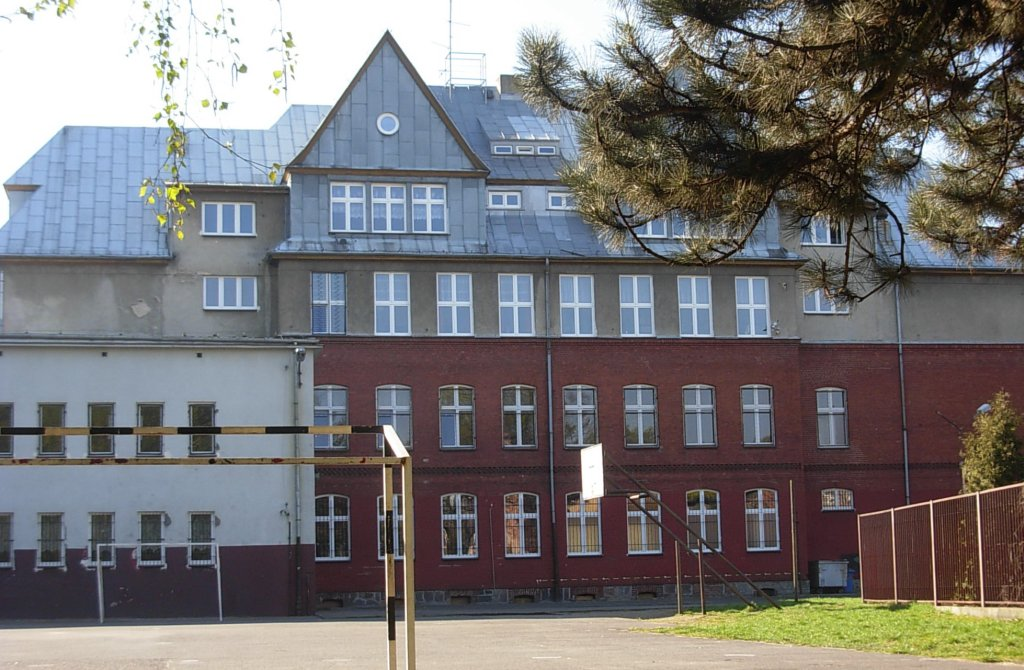
View of the building from Henryk Dąbrowski Park

The building is located on the former territory of Gorzyszkowo farm: at its inception (1828), it was a paid private school run by Dawid Retzlaff, who covered the rent of the classroom and school assistance from his own income. At that time, it was one of the busiest private schools with about 90 students. Despite this, a 1829 report indicated that children from Gorzyszków, Nowy Dwór, Szwederowo and Bielice were mostly without schooling.

In the 1830s, the construction of an evangelical commune school began on a site donated by a tenant of Gorzyszków, referendary at the regional administration. The design was prepared by Kienitz, a building inspector. Between 1842 and 1846, a school building was added here, still designed by Kienitz. Franz Schmidt was the first teacher. Almost 200 children from neighbouring farm villages (Gorzyszków, Nowy Dwór, Szwederowo, Bielice, Biedaszkowo and Wilczak) attended this Protestant school. From 1850 on, with the population growth, several municipalities developed their own schools, and in 1875 joint schools were created for all children of the school district. A new, larger building was erected near the old one by the owner of the Volkmann brick factory, who in 1876, leased it to the municipality. In 1889, 588 children were registered in six classes. Several extensions occurred to fit the rising number of students (1890, 1898, 1901): in 1913 the school was entirely rebuilt to its present state. The grand oak in the courtyard has been planted March 23, 1897, during the Prussian period, to commemorate the 100th birth of the German emperor Wilhelm I: it has been listed as a "Polish Natural Monument".

On February 4, 1920, a Polish, seven-grade school opened in the premises, part of the extended Bydgoszcz territory. The headmaster Władysław Lange initially supervised there 950 students in 21 classes. From 1926 onwards, the institution took the name of Bydgoszcz Third Degree General Public School Nr.XI - Jan Henryk Dąbrowski (Polish: Publiczna Szkoła Powszechna stopnia trzeciego im J.H. Dąbrowskiego nr XI w Bydgoszczy). The school literally flourished during the 1930s.

Under Nazi occupation, the building housed a German primary school for boys and Germanized Poles: the aim was to educate young people in the Nazi militarist spirit. The basement then sheltered anti-aircraft warfare equipment. At the end of World War II, a military hospital was set up in the edifice.

In February 1945, classes at the Polish primary school resumed, with 600 students and 16 teachers. On October 29, 1986, a memorial plaque was unveiled, in memoriam of Seweryn Sobecki, a school teacher murdered by the Nazis in the Valley of Death. In 1996, the school sponsored the memorial obelisk in honor of general Dąbrowski, unveiled in the abutting Henryk Dąbrowski Park. The 1999 Polish school reform act re-categorized on September 1, 2004, the institution as Junior High School Nr.22 (Polish: Gimnazjum nr 22). In 2017, the latter was liquidated and the following year the building was bought by a private school that rented it so far.

==== Bydgoszcz High School Nr.2 (Polish: II Liceum Ogólnokształcące w Bydgoszczy) ====
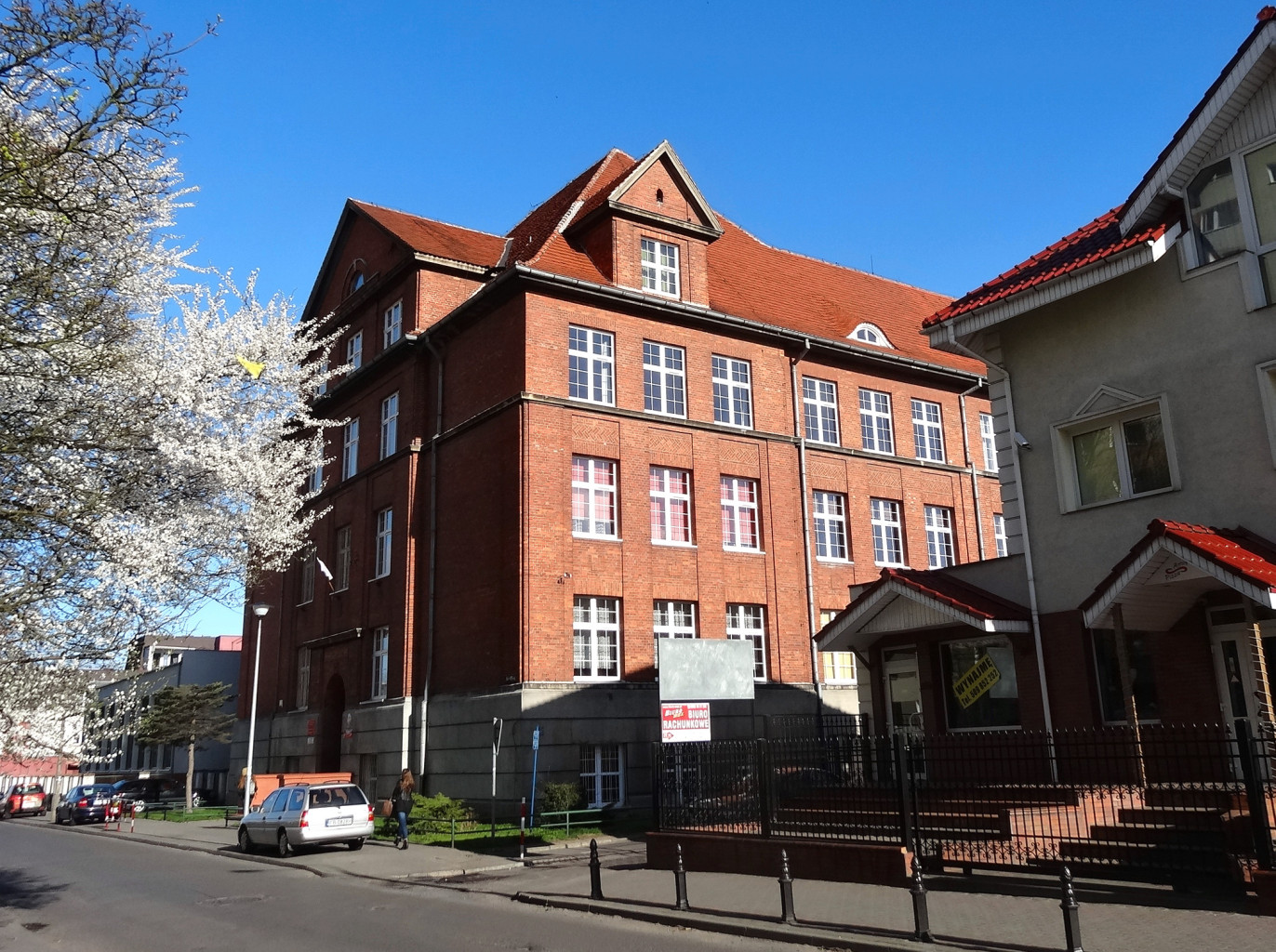
The building from Nowodworska street

The building was built in 1916, by Prussian municipal authorities. In 1920, two Polish classes were created in the then Realschule. On October 15, 1921, the Municipal Middle School of Mathematics and Natural Sciences-Mikołaj Rej was established, as a replacement of the German Realschule. In 1923, in the wake of the celebration of the 450th anniversary of Nicolaus Copernicus birth, the school was given his patronage name. In 1928, the school changed to a Municipal Junior High School, and a few years later to a Municipal High School and Mathematical and Natural Junior High School (Polish: Miejskie Liceum i Gimnazjum Matematyczno-Przyrodnicze).

In 1960, the institution received its current name: High School Nr.2 - Nicolaus Copernicus. In 1999, following a Polish education reform Act, the Junior High School Nr.46 was established.

In 2018, the facility has been renovated (roofing replacement, lightning protection system and attic insulation), while a bit earlier, the pitch underwent refurbishing. It stands at 13 Nowodworska street.

==== Bydgoszcz care and educational facility at 5 Traugutta street ====
The building boasts historicist red brick facades with plastered panels. The multi-storey edifice possesses a basement and an attic under a gable roof; it has a symmetrical shape, with side gabled wings. First floor openings are topped by arches. A separate building was also erected next to the main building, housing playrooms, a gymnasium and utility rooms. The ensemble is registered on the Kuyavian-Pomeranian Voivodeship Heritage List, N°601363, Reg. A/784 (May 5, 1992). In 2019, conservation works on the facade have been implemented, including bricks cleaning and maintenance, replacement of damaged mortar and other elements, and renovation of the gutter system.

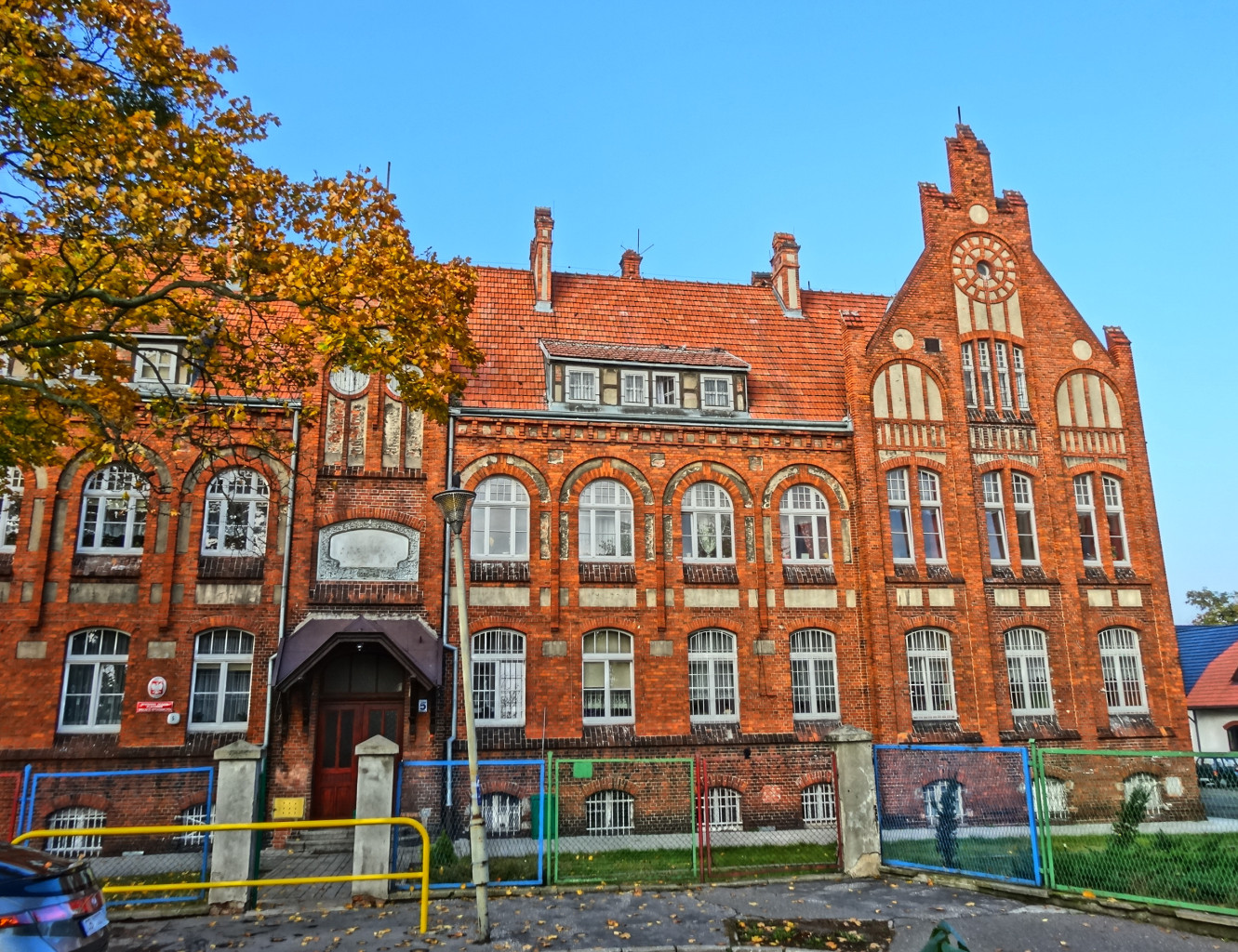
Eastern facade side

The building was erected between 1905 and 1907, by the Heinrich Dietz foundation. Heinrich Ernst Dietz (1840–1901), was a German MP to the Landtag of Prussia, a councilor and a Bromberg magistrate: his will (August 8, 1911) established a foundation for the construction of an orphanage in Bydgoszcz, leaving 400,000 Deutsche Mark at the disposal of the city authorities. The sum was so important for that time that it became necessary to obtain the consent of German Emperor Wilhelm II who issued a permission on August 4, 1903.

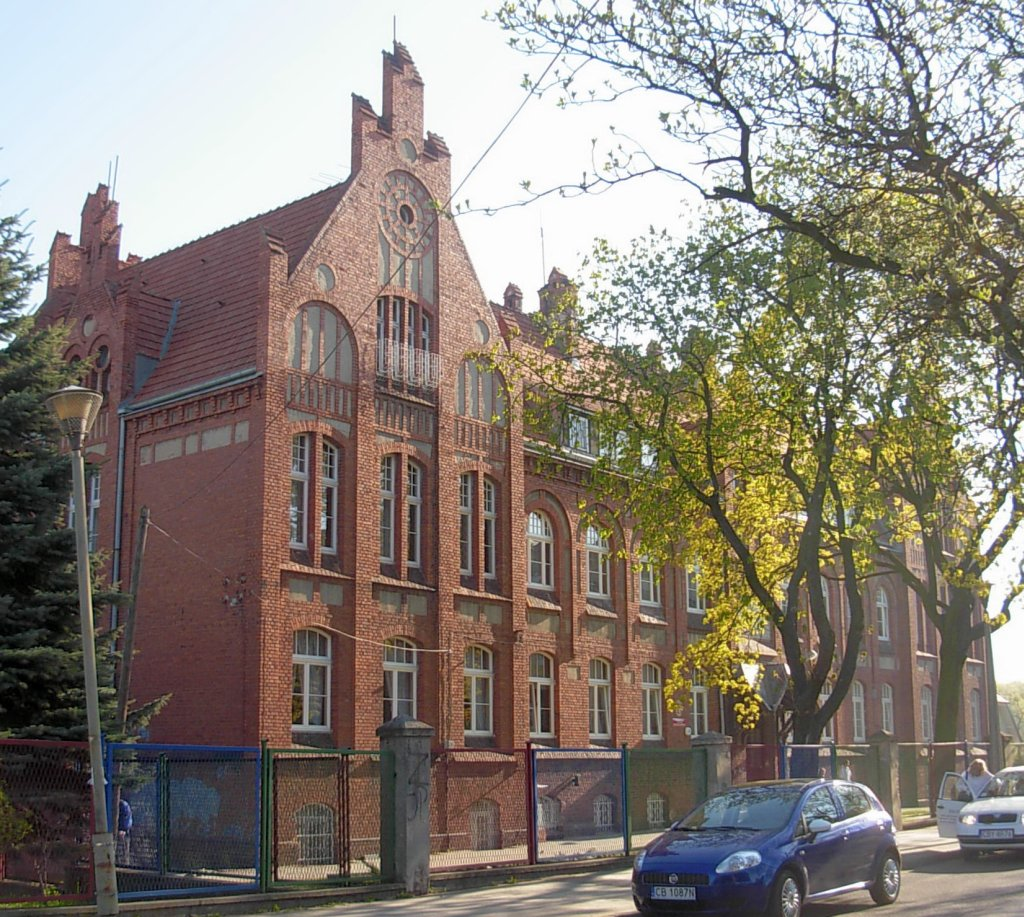
Western side, view from Traugutta street

It was decided to locate the house on the heights of the city next to Wiatrakowa street. The design was realized by Carl Meyer, a city construction councilor. The building had 10 rooms, 2 dormitories, 2 rooms for practical handwork, a kitchen and a chapel. The city donated an adjacent area of 2 hectares (4.9 acres) for the vegetable garden and orchard. Works started in the middle of 1905: the building was officially unveiled on July 18, 1907. The ceremony officials comprised city and region authorities and representatives of the Catholic and Evangelical church.

It was the first orphanage house (Polish: Dom Sierot) in Bydgoszcz, fit for 30 to 40 children from 6 to 16 years old. They were looked after by a caretaker who also educated them and lived with them, together with the supporting staff. The orphans attended a city primary school. After completion, they moved away to have a vocational education with local craftsmen. In tribute to the Dom Sierot founder, the street where the house stood was renamed Heinrich Dietz Straße in 1908. Before WWI, a second orphanage was built at today's 32 Karol Chodkiewicza street.

During the interwar period, the orphanage kept operating, as Henry Dietz Shelter for Orphans (Polish: Przytułek dla Sierot im. Henryka Dietza). In 1923, after an agreement with the municipality authorities, Daughters of Charity of Saint Vincent de Paul from Chełmno took over the house caretaking role. During Nazi occupation, German forces established an Hitlerjugend branch in the building.

At the end of the war, the street was renamed Romuald Traugutt: the former orphanage then housed a laic State Children's Home. In 1974, the institution harboured about 100 pupils, mostly orphans without shelter or morally endangered. In 1978, the orphanage was transformed into an Emergency Care house (Polish: Pogotowie Opiekuńcze) and in 2006, into the Bydgoszcz Care and Education Center (Polish: Bydgoski Zespół Placówek Opiekuńczo-Wychowawczych).

In 1996, as part of the celebration of the 650th anniversary of Bydgoszcz settlement, a bilingual (Polish-German) memorial plaque dedicated to Heinrich Dietz was placed on the wall of the house fencing.

==== Bath house ====
Until 1926, only few bath houses were available in Bydgoszcz, apart from downtown area or in newly built houses:

- Kasa at 2 Warmińskiego street;
- Sanitas at 27 Gdańska street;
- three smaller private facilities.

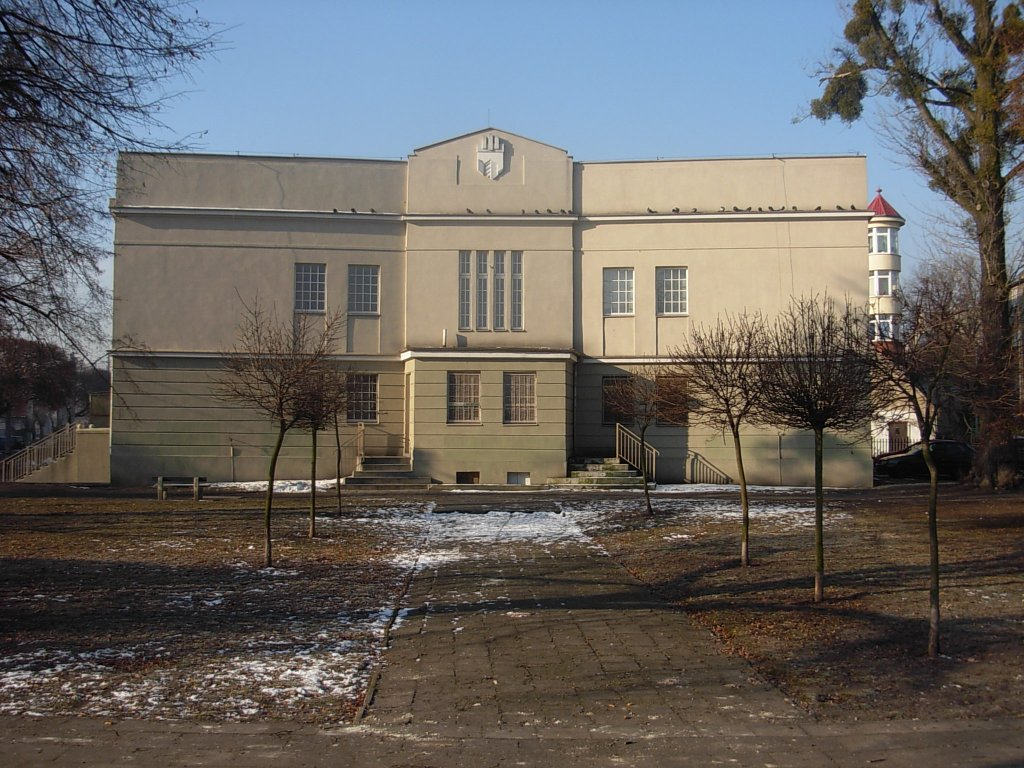
Building of the old bath house

As a consequence, the City Council decided in 1927, to have a new bath house ensemble erected in Szwederowo, a populated suburb. The edifice was located at 2-4 Ignacego Skorupkiego street, designed by Kazimierz Skiciński (1903–1939), a young architect born in Slonim. The City Bath was opened on November 15, 1928: the building displayed a modernist lines and modern technical solutions. Bathroom booths were spacious, with a separated undressing room, comprising six bathtubs and 16 showers. The facility was met with a successful attendance: people from all over the city came, however, the majority of them lived in the area of Szwederowo where at that time only a few apartments had bathrooms. The complex was rebuilt in 1940 and in 1954: in 1956, there were 17 bathtubs and 10 showers, plus a waiting room, an undressing room and disinfection chamber.

In the 1950s, daily average numbers showed 280 customers in winter and 90 in summer. The bathhouse was closed in 1981. The city administrative real estate (Polish: Administracja Domów Miejskich-ADM) was then billeted in the building until 2010, when it moved to private hands, after a renovation in 2007. The edifice houses today a Health Center City Baths, run by the Araszkiewicz family: it provides medical services, combined with a Development and Culture Center.

==== Old water tower ====
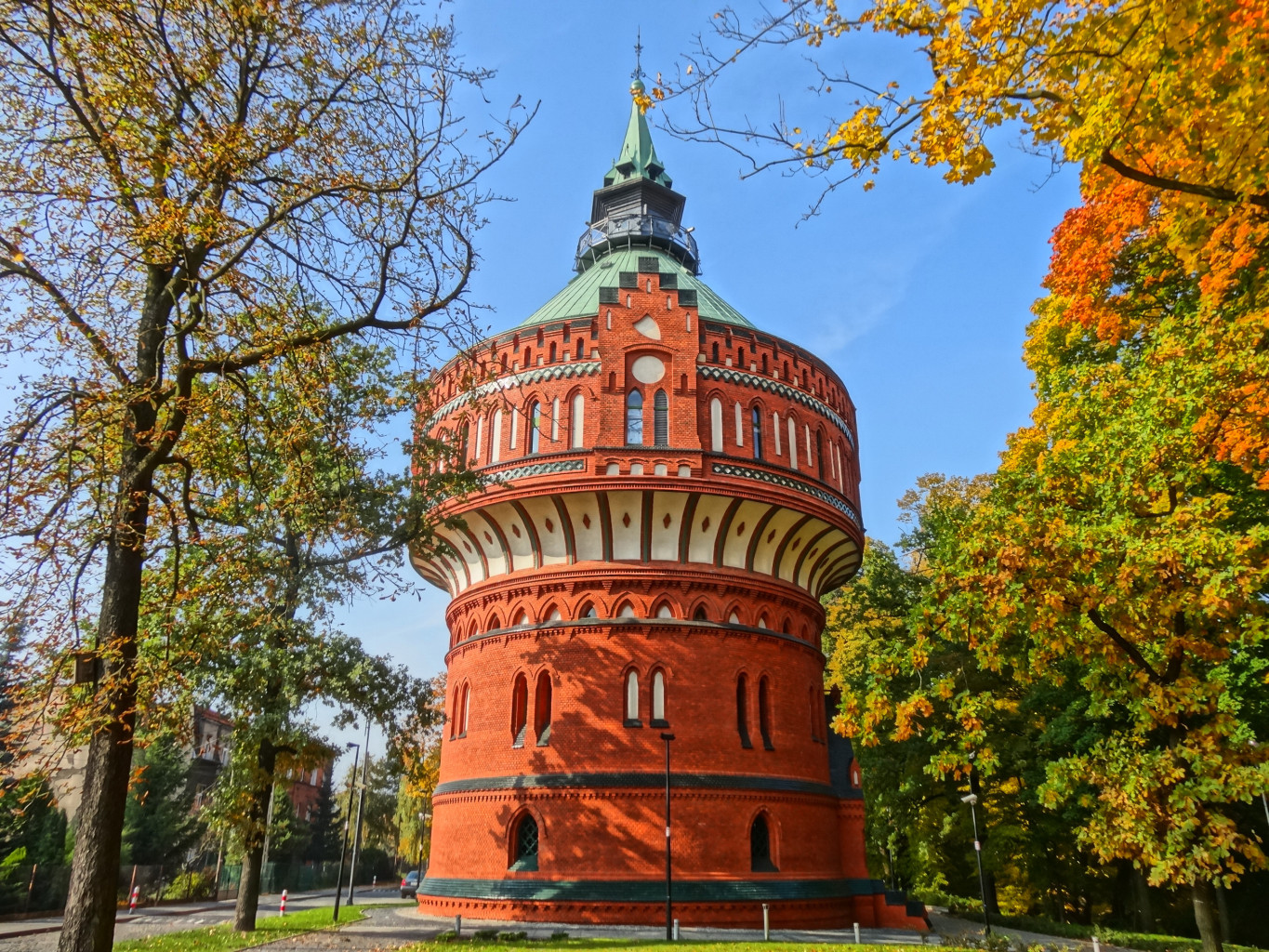
View from Filarecka street

The Old Water Tower is a historic water tower belonging to the municipal water supply network of Bydgoszcz, Poland. Its importance in the local history has been acknowledged in 1986 by a registering on the Kuyavian-Pomeranian Voivodeship Heritage List, N°601290, A/741, January 15, 1986. The tower has been completed in 1900, as part of the design and construction of a new waterworks for the city of Bromberg.

==== Our Lady of Perpetual Help ====
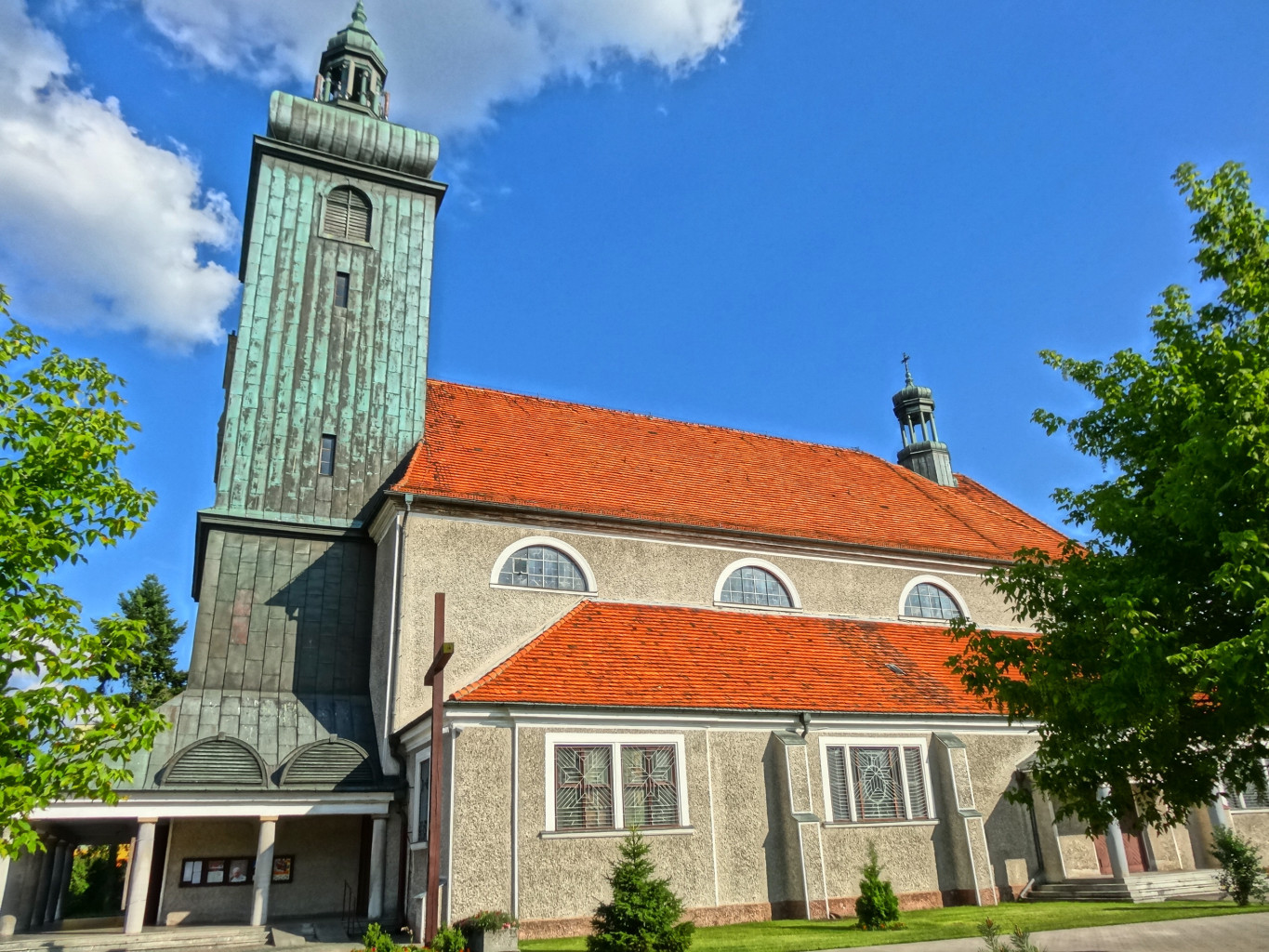
View from the churchyard

The Church of Our Lady of Perpetual Help is a wood and brick Catholic church, located on the southern heights of Bydgoszcz, at 16 Ugory street.

Designed by architect Stefan Cybichowski, it was consecrated on October 28, 1928.

==== Building of the Army Recruiting Command (Polish: Wojskowa Komenda Uzupełnień-WKU) at 1 Szubińska street ====
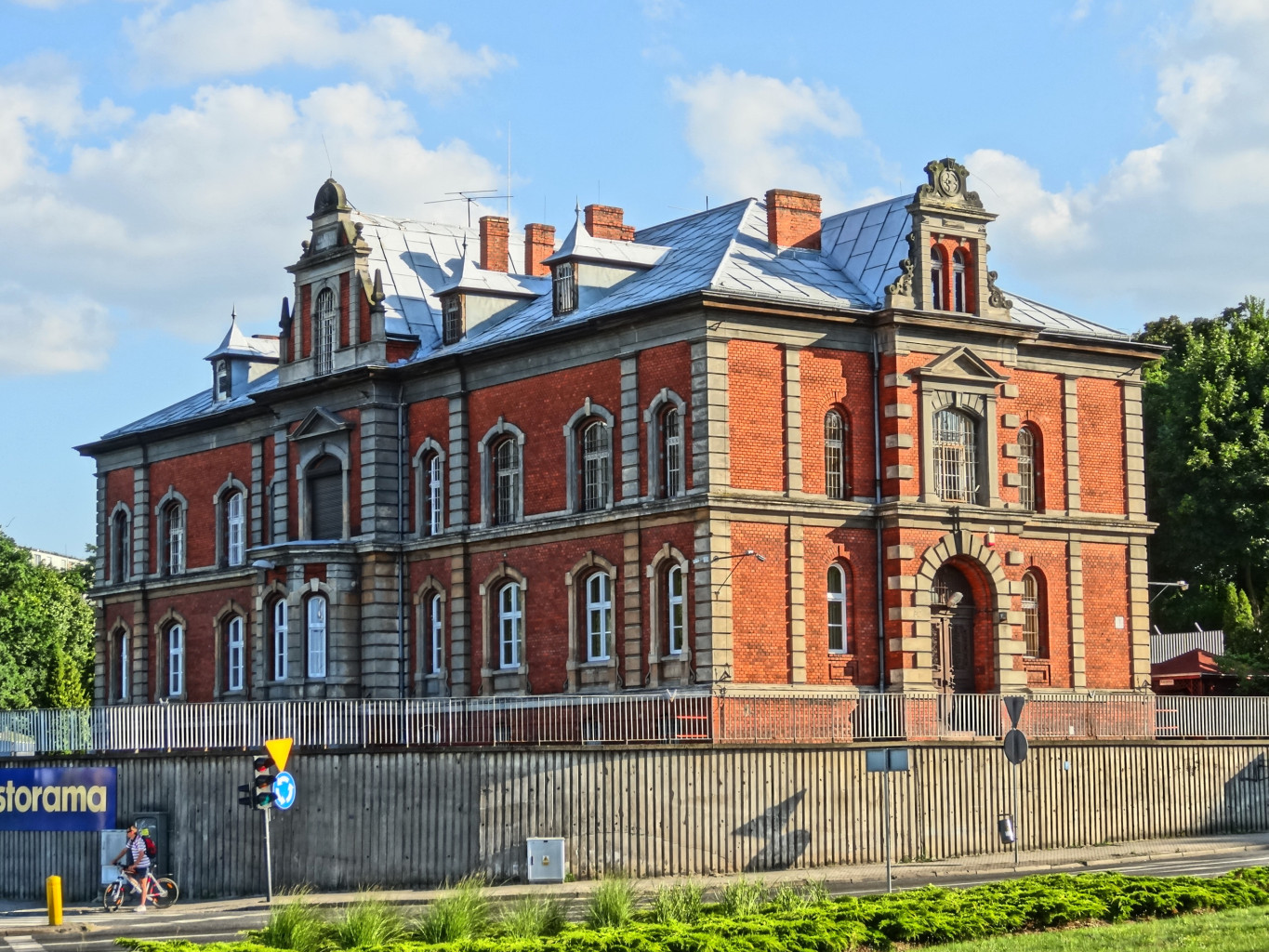
View from Szubińska street

This large building was erected in 1884–1885, as a request from the will of Luiza Gisse-Rafalska, owner of an estate at Rupienica (today's Glinki district). Known as Luisen Stift (English: Luiza Foundation), it was located at the time at Bromberg's 1 Schubiner straße.

The villa was to be built at the foot of the Wiessmann Hill, rich in alleys, fountains and observation terraces, as a home for lonely well-off gentlemen and wealthy maidens. The facility provided shelter to 42 people, including 17 permanent residents, who, against appropriate fees, were provided with housing, lighting, heating, medical care and (when necessary) funeral. Residents had to be over 55 years old and had to be living in Bydgoszcz for at least 20 years.

After WWII, with the building of a retirement home on Mińska street (along Bydgoszcz Canal), the villa became a tenement house and on February 15, 1951, it was taken over by Army Recruiting Command. Beforehand, WKU'seat (or initially called Powiatowej Komendy Uzupełnień-PKU) moved from 145 Gdańska street (1921), to 9 Bema street (1925) to 9 Dworcowa Street (1945).

The edifice underwent a full restoration in 2017.

=== Monuments ===
==== Monumental cross (1935) ====
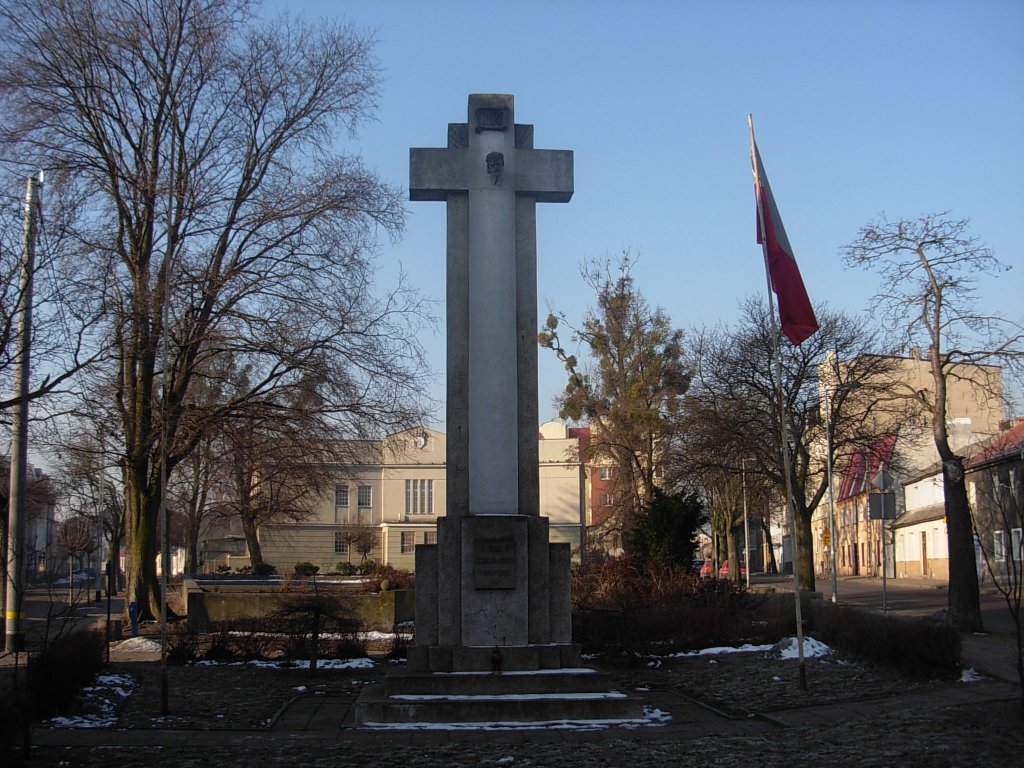
The cross seen from streets crossing

In 1935, a 7.5 metres (25 ft) high monumental cross with the figure of a larger-than-normal crucified Jesus Christ was erected on the place facing the bathing house. It was the work of a local sculptor, Teodor Gajewski. The latter also co-created in 1932, the Statue of the Sacred Heart of Jesus: a copy stands today in Seminaryjna Street.

The blessing of the cross by Father Jan Konopczyński happened on May 3, 1935.

In the first weeks of Nazi occupation, the monument was demolished by the Germans. In 1992, on the initiative of the parish of Our Lady of Perpetual Help and the Association of Szwederowo's friends (Polish: Koło Miłośników Szwederowa), the monument has been rebuilt. A fragment of the original sculpture -the head in a crown of thorns- saved from destruction during WWII by Stefan Kuś, has been incorporated back. On September 1, 1992, the new cross has been consecrated by the archbishop of Gniezno and primate of Poland Henryk Muszyński.

==== Fountain Children playing with fish (1934) ====
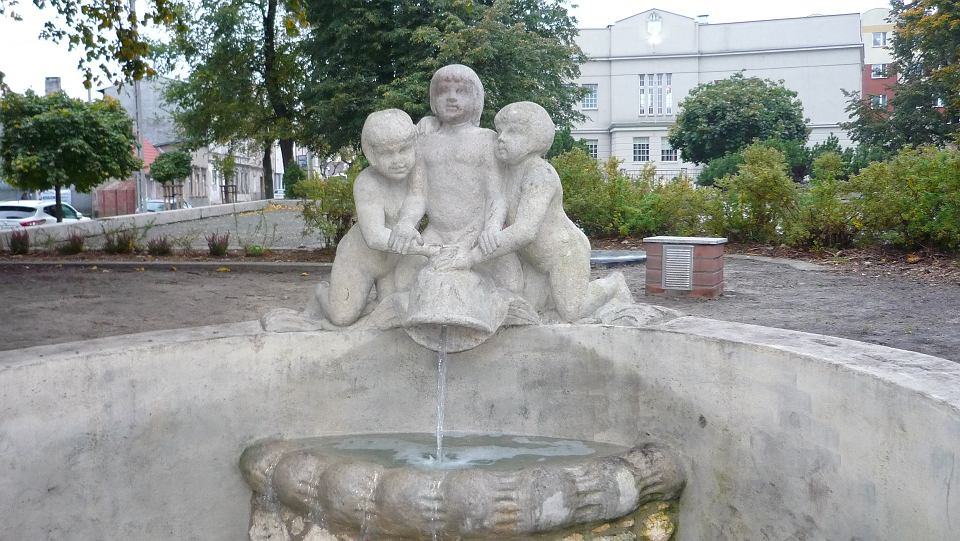
Fountain Szwederowo - Children playing with fish

In 1934, local sculptor Teodor Gajewski realized Children playing with fish (Polish: Dzieci bawiące się z rybą), incorporating a fountain facing the new city baths inaugurated on November 10, 1928.

The monument was made from artificial stone and depicted three children sitting on a fish, from whose mouth the fountain water flowed into a pool.

The devastated sculpture was renovated in 2014–2015, during which all the missing elements were reconstructed and a retaining wall around the fountain was built. In 2016, the installation work began and the water fountain was operating back in October 2017.

==== 18 November 1956 plaque (1996) ====
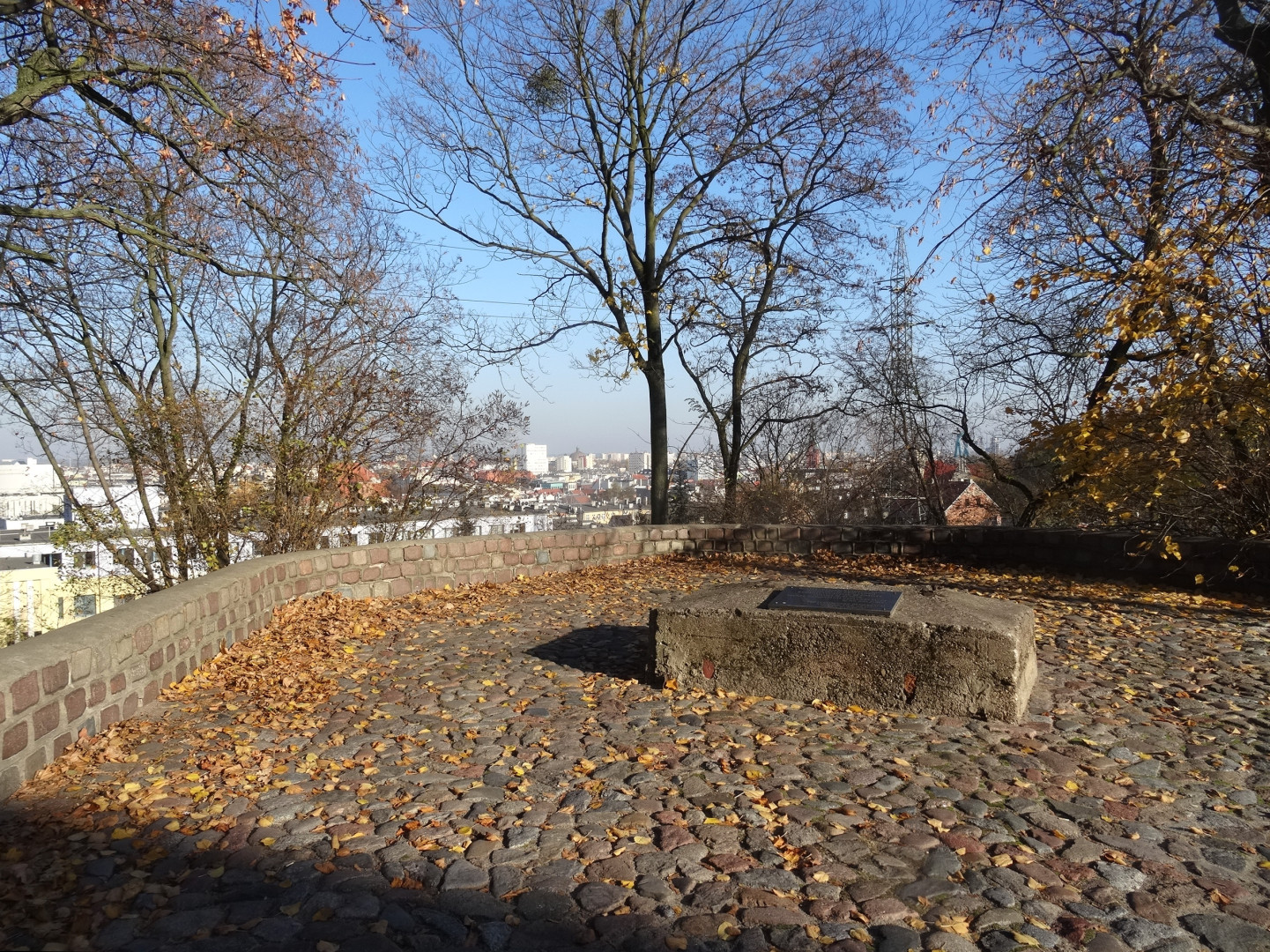
Location of the memorial plaque

At the beginning of the 1950s, communist authorities erected a 25 metres (82 ft) tall wooden tower in the eastern part of Henryk Dąbrowski Park in order to jamm Radio Madrid, an anti-communist radio station. In the wake of the Polish October, a spontaneous demonstration burned down this radio jamming contrivance on November 18, 1956.

On November 17, 1996, Polish Labour Party unveiled a granite memorial plaque on the very place where stood the jamming mast, on the occasion of the 40th anniversary of the destructive riot led by Bydgoszcz citizens.

==== Monument to Jan Henryk Dąbrowski (1995) ====
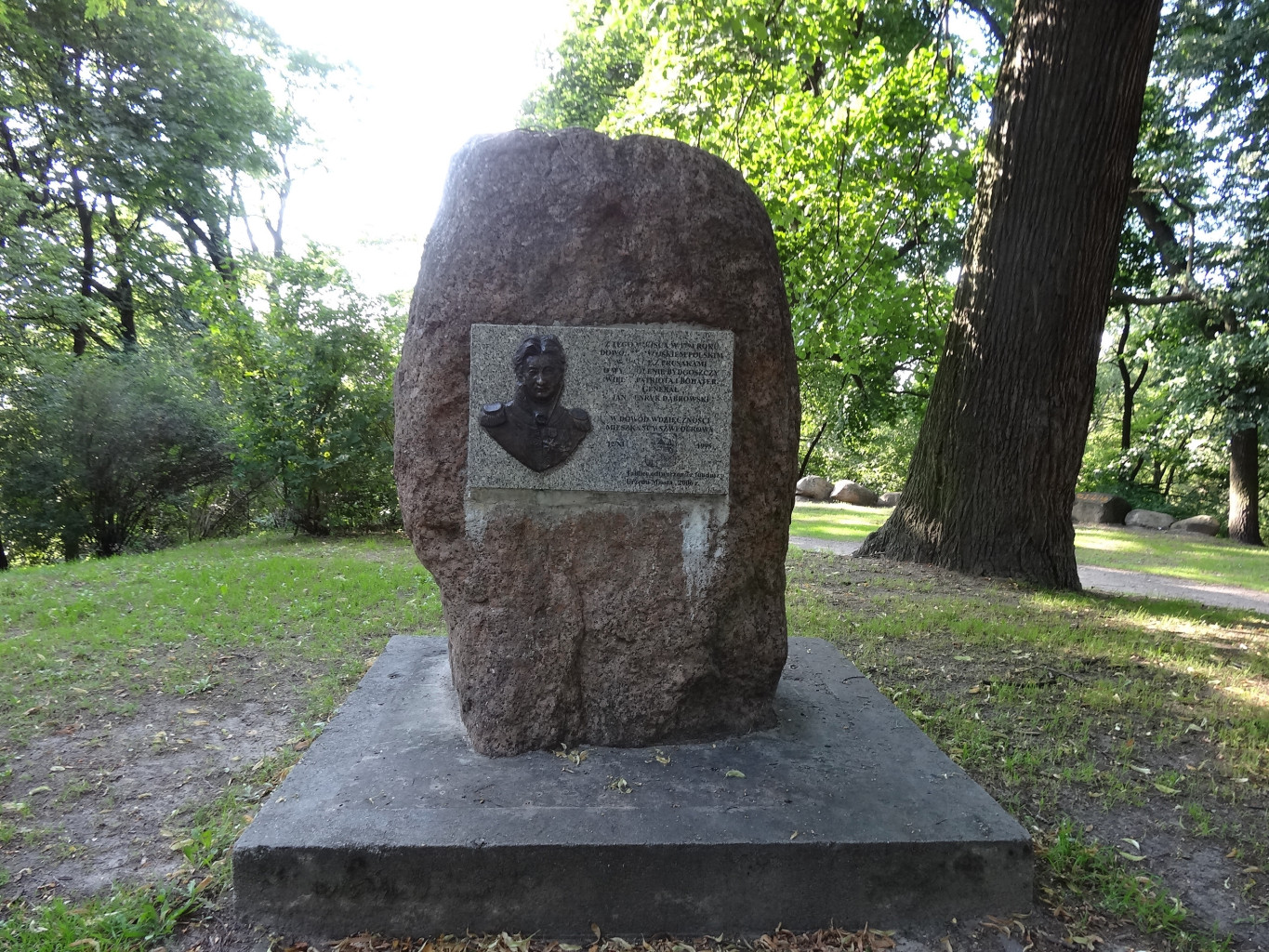
Dąbrowski memorial stone

As part of the events of the Kościuszko Uprising, Dąbrowski's corps reached and captured Bydgoszcz on October 2, 1794. He stopped at the hills of today's Henryk Dąbrowski Park, with his artillery deployed near present day's water tower location and aiming at the southern gate (Poznań gate).

On November 12, 1995, at the initiative of the Szwederowo Housing Council, a stone obelisk was inaugurated, bearing a commemorative plaque in honor of the general (for the 240th anniversary of his birth).

==== Memorial to the fallen of September 1939 (1965) ====
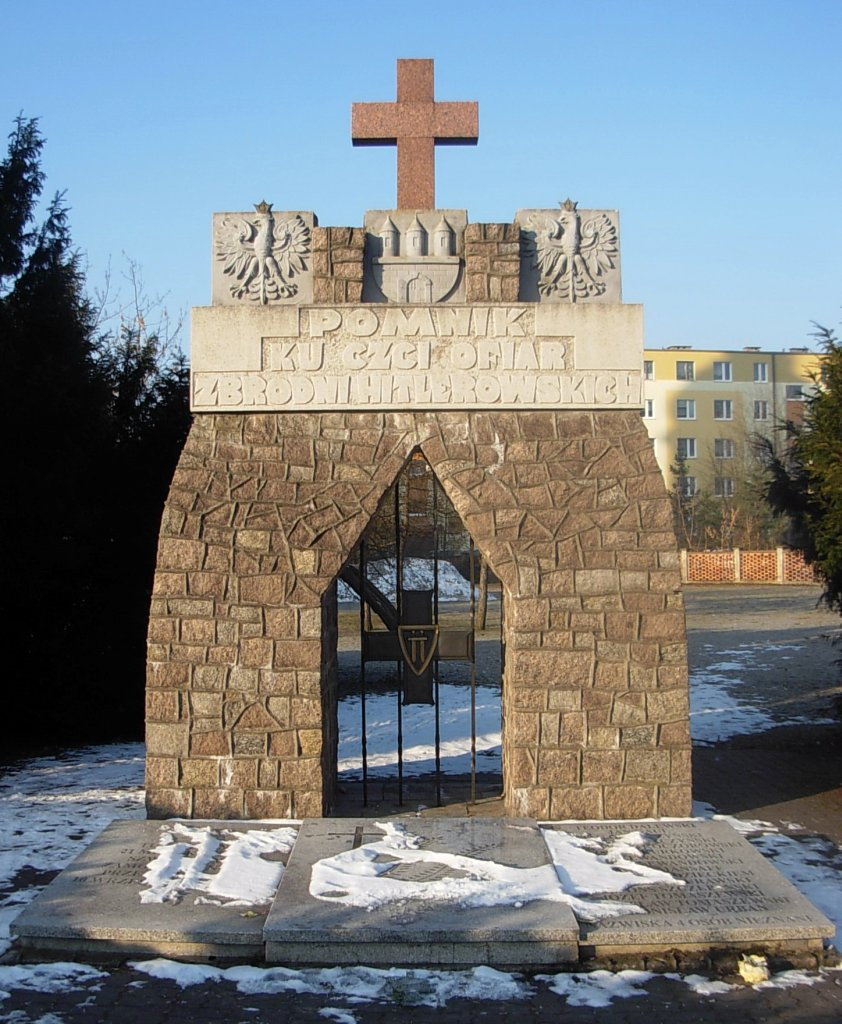
Memorial to the fallen of September 1939

In September 1939, Nazi forces perpetrated executions in the churchyard of Church of Our Lady of Perpetual Help in Szwederowo.

A monument to commemorate this crime was erected on September 10, 1965, designed by sculptor Józef Makowski.

It bears the inscription

Monument In Honor of the Victims of Nazi Crimes

with plaques informing that Here 21 inhabitants of Szwederowo are buried, murdered by the occupier on September 10, 1939.

A second table contains the names of the victims.

==== Monument to Maria Konopnicka (1993) ====
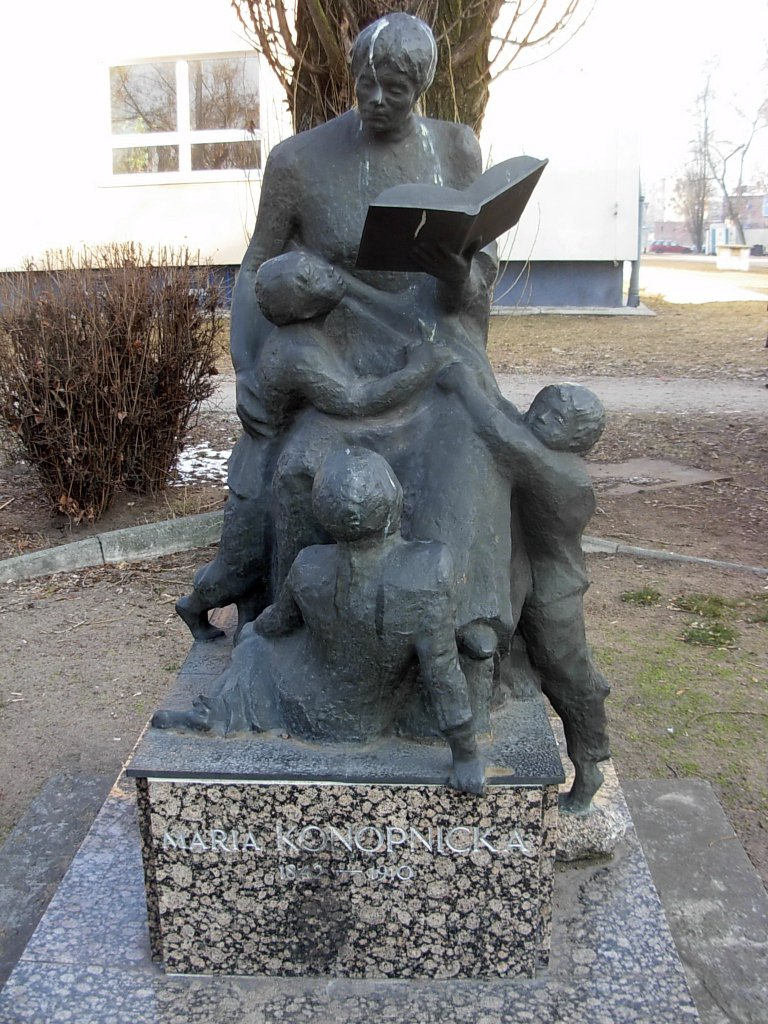
Monument to Maria Konopnicka

The monument has been unveiled on 25 September 1993, at the initiative of the Association of Szwederowo's Friends (Polish: Koło Miłośników Szwederowa) and the Society of the Friends of Bydgoszcz (Polish: Towarzystwo Miłośników Miasta Bydgoszczy): it is standing at 26 Maria Konopnicka street and has been officially dedicated by Ryszard Pruczkowski, priest from the neighbouring parish of Corpus Christi.

Maria Konopnicka (1842–1910) was a Polish poet, novelist, children's writer, translator, journalist, critic, and activist for women's rights and for Polish independence.

Made out of bronze, the sculpture portrays the seated poet reading her poems to three children around her. It has been realized by Krystyna Panasik.

==== Sculpture from Maria Konopnicka's fairy tale (2012) ====
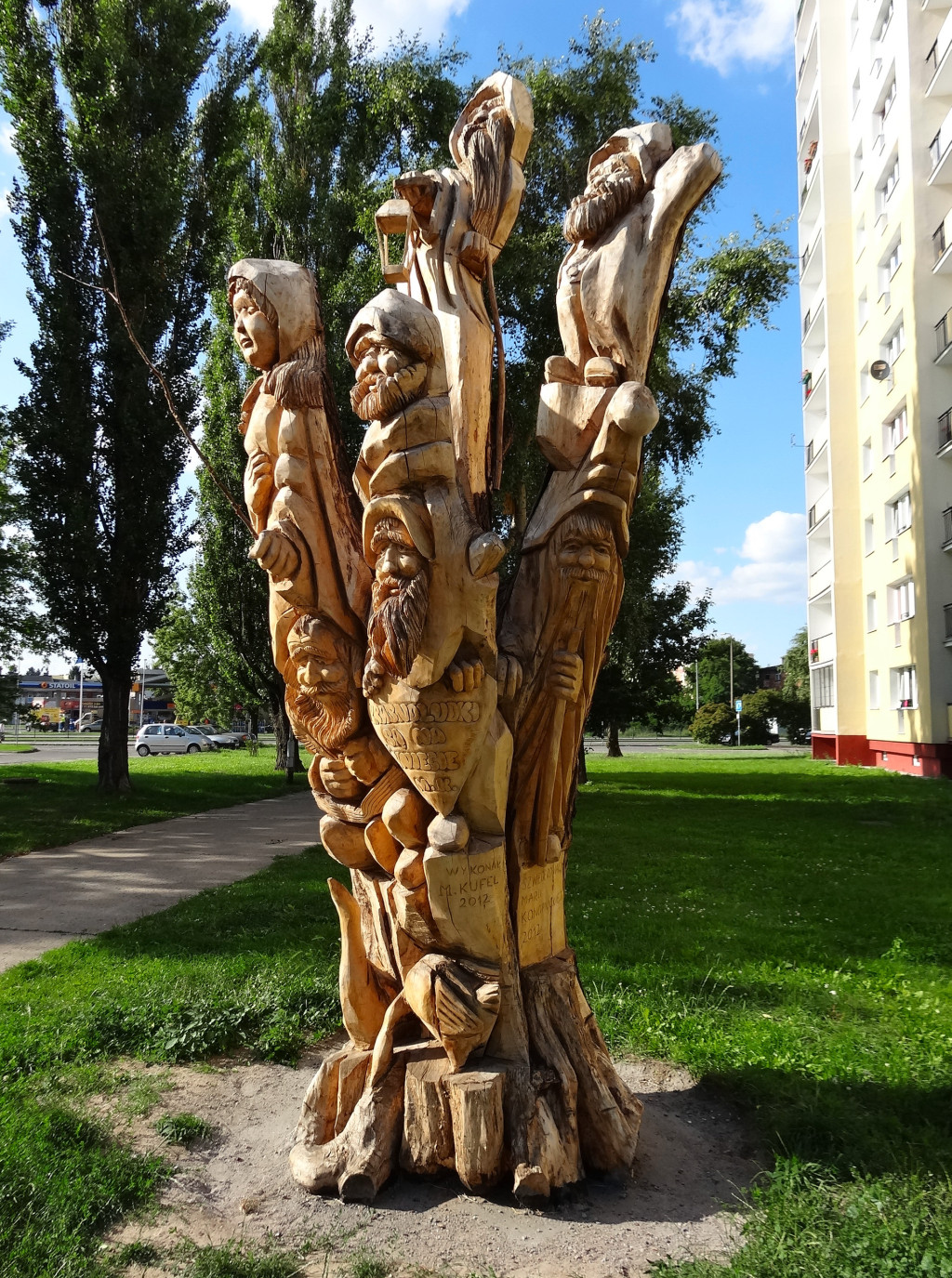
Wooden sculpture after a tale from Maria Konopnicka

In 2012, a wooden sculpture referring to a tale from Maria Konopnicka was inaugurated on Konopnicka street.

Realized by Bydgoszcz sculptor Mirosław Kufel out of a withered poplar trunk, it represents 7 dwarfs overlooking 2 geese, recalling a short story Orphan Marysia and Dwarfs, by Maria Konopnicka.

== See also ==
- Bydgoszcz
- Teodor and Franciszek Gajewski
- Olędrzy
- Swedish Deluge
- Kościuszko Uprising

== Bibliography ==
- Gordon, Wincenty (1972). Bydgoskie dzielnice (II) – Szwederowo. Kalendarz Bydgoski (in Polish). Bydgoszcz: Towarzystwo Miłośników Miasta Bydgoszczy. pp. 57–61.
- Pastuszewski, Stefan (1996). Bydgoska Gospodarka Komunalna. Praca zbiorowa (in Polish). Bydgoszcz: Instytut Wydawniczy „Świadectwo”. ISBN 83-85860-37-1.
- Kaja, Renata (1995). Bydgoskie pomniki przyrody (in Polish). Bydgoszcz: Instytut Wydawniczy „Świadectwo”. ISBN 83-85860-32-0.
