= Henryk Dąbrowski Park =

Urban park, 19th century, Bydgoszcz, Poland

Coordinates: 53°7′10″N 17°59′39″E

Henryk Dąbrowski Park and Aleja Górska
- Polish: Park Henryka Dąbrowskiego i Aleja Górska w Bydgoszczy
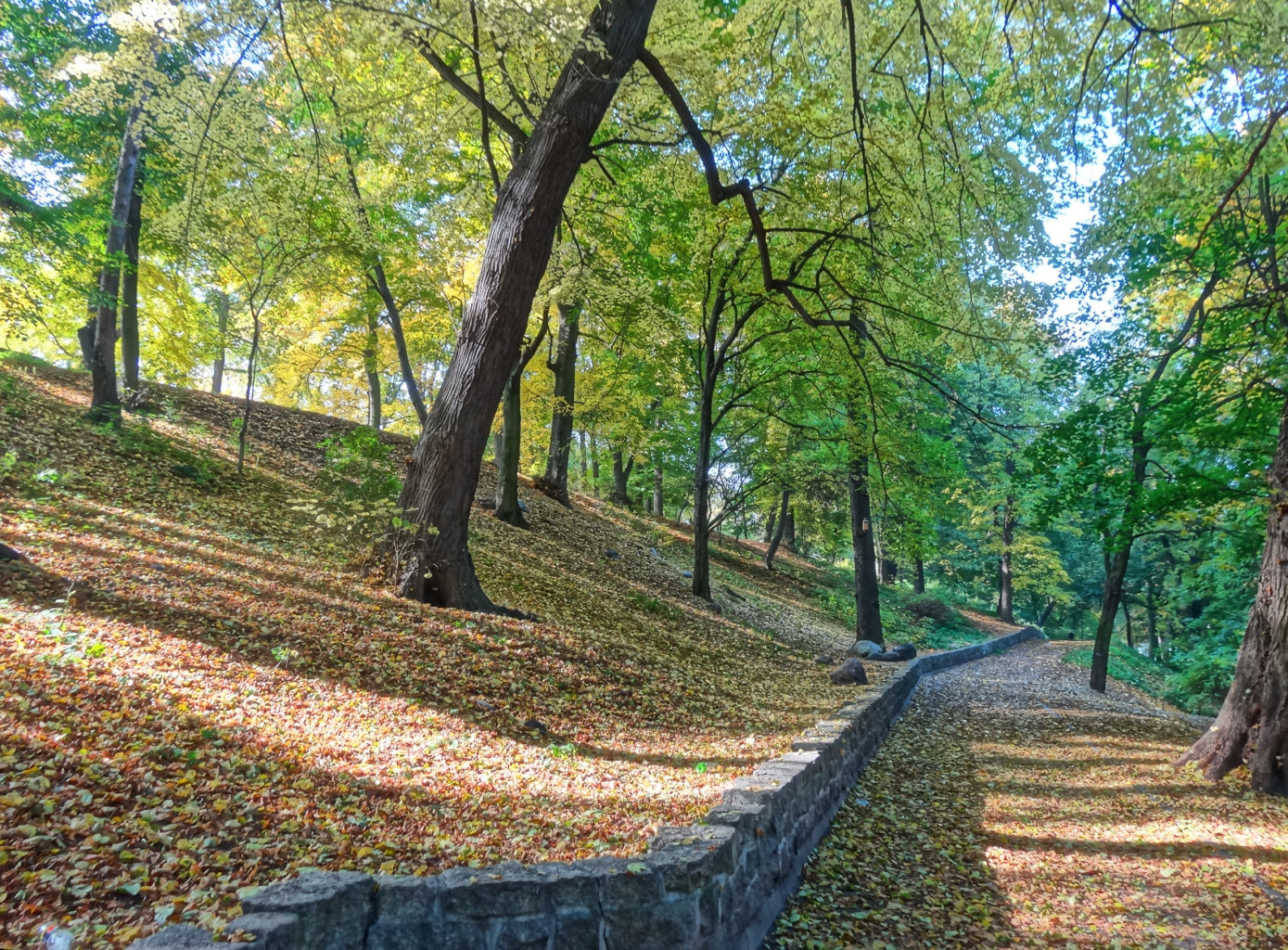
- View of Henryk Dąbrowski Park
- Interactive map of Henryk Dąbrowski Park and Aleja Górska
- Location: Bydgoszcz, Poland
- Area: 2.89 hectares (7.1 acres) and 2.63 hectares (6.5 acres)
- Created: 1832 and 1890
- Founder: Carl von Wissmann
- Etymology: Jan Henryk Dąbrowski
- Owner: City of Bydgoszcz

Henryk Dąbrowski Park is a green area covering 2,89 ha, located on the heights of Bydgoszcz, Poland. Aleja Górska is a smaller green walking path that extends to the east of the park.

== Location ==
The park occupies a rectangular area of 70 metres (77 yd) by 400 metres (440 yd) in the Szwederowo district. It is surrounded by the following streets: Filarecka, Grudziądzka, Podgórna and Stroma. This rectangle is partly situated on two hills separated by a small valley. This very spot has been named Jan Henryk Dąbrowski hill, playing a major role during the Battle of Bydgoszcz in October 1794. Aleja Górska has a surface of 2.63 hectares (6.5 acres), hemmed by Nowy Rynek square, Terasy, Wiatrakowa and Kujawska streets.

== History ==
The park was founded in 1832 at the initiative of Carl von Wissmann, then president of the administrative region of Bromberg; for this decision, a part of the hill where stands the park has been renamed the Wissmann Hill (German: Wissmannshöhe). This realization was one of the first carried out by the nascent Society for the Embellishment of Bromberg (German: Verschönerungsverein zu Bromberg), established in 1833. During the first twenty years of its activity, the association displayed a certain creativity in favor of the aesthetics of the city. The strip of land identified for the project was located close to a former farm called Górzyskowo, its western tip encroaching upon the terrain of the first Jewish cemetery of the city, founded in 1816 and closed to sepulture in 1874.

After the purchase of the wooded hill terrain in 1828-1829, municipal authorities oversaw the park building, completed in autumn 1832. The designers were master Barthold (overall design and greenery planting) and master Klopsch (roads and circulation). Several species pre-existed on the spot (oaks, beeches and hornbeams) and chestnuts had been planted there in 1812–1816. During the greenery composition (1832-1833), 10 species of ornamental shrubs and 100 species of perennial and water flowers were planted. Trees were planted in several steps: mainly in 1864, 1892 and 1900. On 2 September 1871 the so-called Oak of Peace was officially put in the ground.

On the eastern part of the park allegedly stood the Kujawian stronghold (8th-11th century) and Swedish trenches from the 17th century (German: Schwedenschantze): in this area a viewing platform onto the city was set up, and in 1844, a bust of Carl von Wissmann was unveiled (destroyed in 1928). In 1900, during the creation of the waterworks network, a water tower was built at Filarecka Street, with a pay-to-access observation deck round its roof.

Two ponds were set up on the western part, both fenced and illuminated, displaying a water fountain and a waterfall. They were called Adlerteiche (Eagle pond) and Baptistenteiche (Baptist Ponds). A lower pond, where the water cascade was flowing down to, was created in 1908: since it had goldfishes, it was called Goldfischteich.

During the interwar years, the Jewish cemetery adjacent to the park was devastated. In 1920, the park was named after General Jan Henryk Dąbrowski to celebrate his capture Bydgoszcz by the Kościuszko Uprising (1794). On 2 October Dąbrowski's corps reached Bydgoszcz and stopped at the hills south of the city: his artillery was deployed where today stands the water tower and fired on the city, aiming at the southern gate (Poznań gate).

In 1930, new species were planted: the park surface then reached 2.85 hectares (7.0 acres), its largest area ever. In 1938, 56 sorts of plants were catalogued, among others: sessile oak, horse chestnut, Norway maple, field maple, sycamore, black alder, hornbeam, Siberian peashrub, ash tree, common beech, silver poplar, small-leaved lime, large-leaved lime, bird cherries, Swedish whitebeam, Scotch elm, European white elm, grapewine, cypress, European larch, fir, Scots pine, spruce, yew. Along the paths, one could find poplars, lime trees, maple trees and oaks.

In 1942, the Jewish cemetery was liquidated; after WWII, the place was converted to a green area.

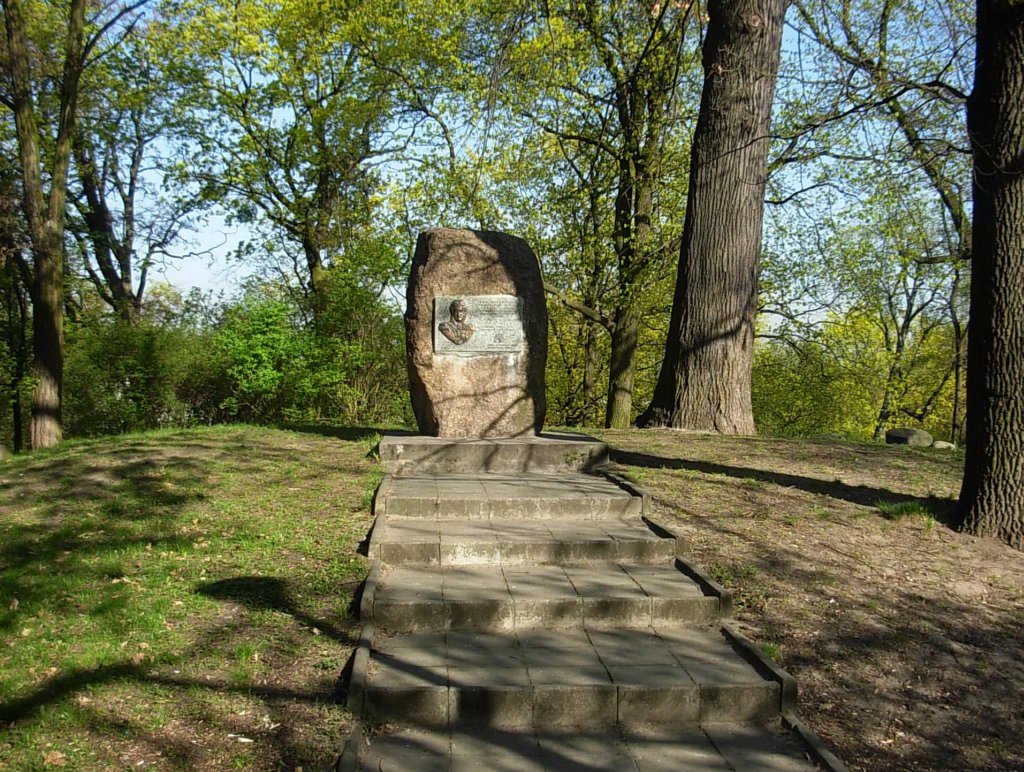
Monument to Henryk Dabrowski, 1995

At the beginning of the 1950s, authorities erected a 25 metres (82 ft) high wooden tower in the eastern part of the park in order to jamm Radio Madrid, an anti-communist radio station. In the wake of the Polish October, a spontaneous demonstration burned down this radio jamming contrivance on 18 November 1956. Although perpetrators were victims of repression during the following years, the device was never rebuilt.

In 1995, in the western part of the park was unveiled a monument realized by local sculptor Krystyna Panasik: an obelisk bearing a commemorative plaque in honor of General Henryk Dąbrowski. In 1996, another memorial plaque was set on the very location of the former radio jamming tower. In 2002, a renovation was carried out, aiming at park alleys, greenery, the water cascade system, the fountains and the waterfall.

In 2016, a park regeneration project was prepared, with several objectives:

- restoring the historical spatial arrangements (e.g. the recreation area on the lower terrace with a viewing point);
- marking out missing paths, especially in the western part, leading to the Henryk Dąbrowski monument;
- construction of stone stairs down to Stroma street (western end of the park);
- upgrading small architecture elements (e.g. benches, information boards, nest boxes for birds and bats, stylized LED lanterns).

The plan also comprised a reconstruction of the lighting system and new plantings (including azaleas, magnolias and rhododendrons), especially those providing provide food for birds and insects. Restoration works, which costed 2,5 million PLN, started in August 2018 and have been completed in June 2019.

== Aleja Górska ==
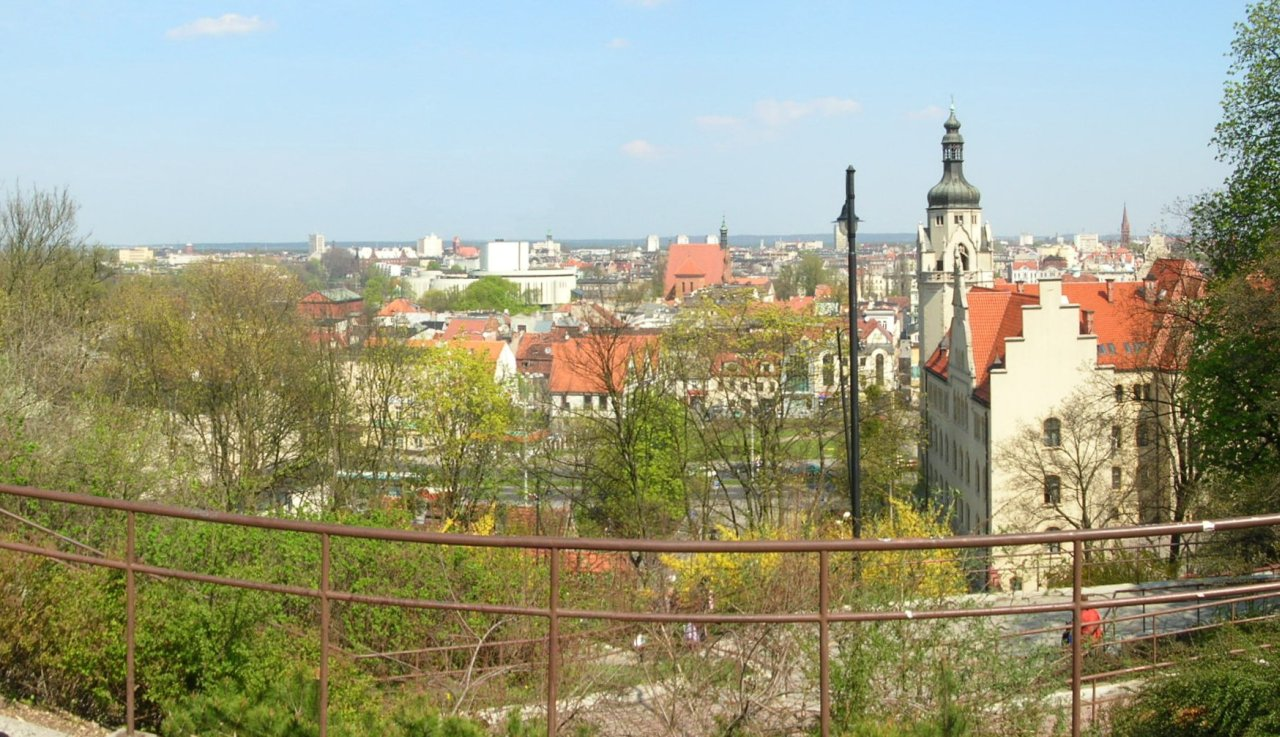
View of the old town from Aleja Górska

The area was originally named Circular public gardens (Polish: Planty Okrężne), in reference to the Public gardens on the Brda river (Polish: Planty nad Brdą) which was a walking and recreation path located on the embankment of the Brda river. This circular path on the hills were at the time (1890) an alternative route allowing to enjoy the panorama on the city. Construction works of these gardens started at the end of the 19th century. They were built in several stages (1890, 1910, 1922 and 1940-1942), as an extension of the walking and viewing trail from the then Park on Wissmann hill. At the turn of the 20th century, many dry creeks were present along adjacent the streets (Terasy, Wiatrakowa and Kujawska). The initial public gardens were incorporated into the Freedom Park, covering 9.7 hectares (24 acres) in a luxurious way: 70 species of deciduous trees, conifers and shrubs were catalogued.

Today, Aleja Górska runs between Terasy (in the west) and Wiatrakowa (in the east) streets, on the slope parallel to Nowodworska street (in the south) which overlooks New Market square. It borders the backyards of the Secondary High school and the Catholic schools. An observation platform offers a wide panorama over the old town, accessible by a series of stairs built in 1993-1995. The eastern end of Aleja Górska leads at Wiatrakowa street, located in a gorge, were once stood several windmills for cereals, giving its name to the street (windmill is wiatrak in Polish).

The stairs have been refurbished in 2014, part of an overall renovation plan spanning from Henryk Dąbrowski Park to the Heroes Cemetery (Polish: Cmentarz Bohaterów Bydgoszczy).

== Elements in the historic green ensemble of the city southern hill ==
As early as the mid-19th century, these green areas was subsumed in a larger ensemble located on the southern hilly side of Bromberg. It represented a 6 kilometres (3.7 mi) long walking trail, albeit partially interrupted, from where you could appreciate the panorama upon the city.

At that time, the ring of hills was crisscrossed by dry creeks and paths leading the parks. They were identified through time as:

- Park on Prince hill (German: Prinzehöhe) (est. 1834), located between present day Lubelska and Seminaryjna streets. On 15 June 1835 Frederick William IV of Prussia, then crown prince to the Prussian throne, paid a visit to the park, giving it its name. Surviving plots can be found today along the green slope facing Seminaryjna street;

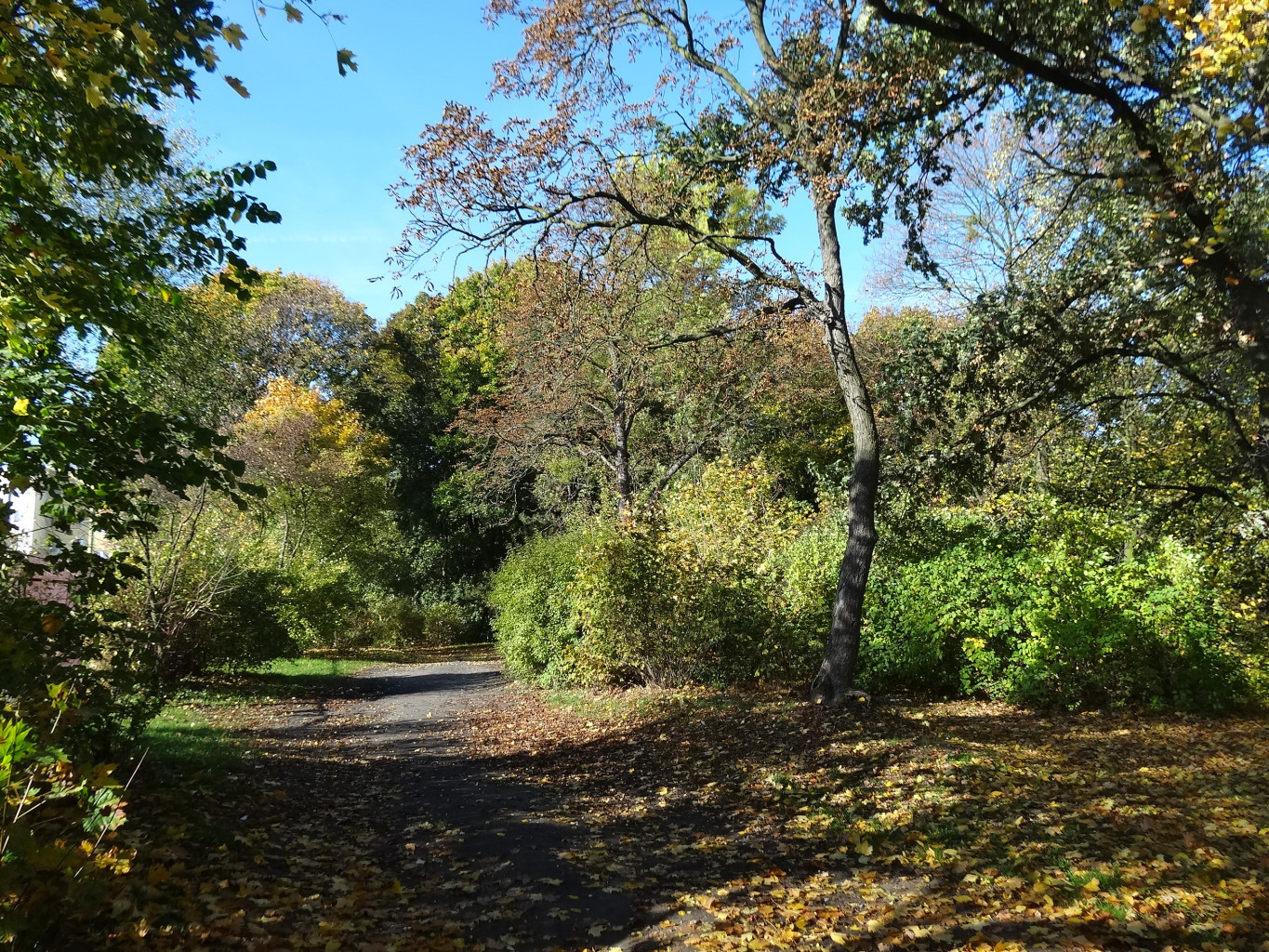
View of the park on Wolności Hill

- Park on Naumann Hill (est. 1870), located between Szubińska, Seminaryjna and Wysoka streets. This 7 hectares (17 acres) park was created by Johann Gottlieb Naumann who was at the time president of Bromberg administrative region and chairman of the Society for the Embellishment of Bromberg. He gave his name to the height (German: Naumannshöhe). In 1907, the park was divided between the newly built Catholic seminary and the deaconesses hospital established in 1885 (today's Regional Pulmonology Center);
- Henryk Dąbrowski Park, called Park on Wissmann hill till 1920;
- Aleja Górska, created in 1890 under the name Circular park (Polish: Planty Okrężne);
- Park on Wolności Hill (1913), called until 1920 Park on Bismarck hill (Greek: Bismarckhöhe);
- Viewing points trails along hills on Wyżyny and Kapuściska districts (1950–1980).

Today, the path along Bydgoszcz hilly southern slopes offers a panorama of the city from Henryk Dąbrowski Park to Aleja Górska and Kujawska street. The trail continues east, up the stairs to the Park on Wolności Hill, reaching Jan Biziel hospital: further eastern segments of this panorama walking path are located in Wyżyny and Kapuściska districts.

== Species ==
About 50 species of trees and shrubs grow around the two cascade ponds, both on the upper and lower terraces connected by stairs, including large-leaved lime, horse chestnut, common beech, black locust, Norway and field maples and sycamore.

One of the essential architectural element of the park is bought by the presence of the 1900 water tower, built to regulate the pressure in the municipal waterworks network. Since 2012, it houses Bydgoszzc waterworks museum, as well as offering a view of the city.

One can admire Polish Natural Monuments in Henryk Dąbrowski Park, Aleja Górska and their immediate surroundings:

Nr.	Type	Number	Localisation	Data
I.	Ginkgo	1	In Filarecka street, upper pond	circumference/96 centimetres (38 in)
II.	Siberian elm	1	In Filarecka street, upper pond	
III.	Elm	1	In Filarecka street, upper pond	circumference/248 centimetres (98 in)
IV.	Small-leaved linden	1	Park low terrace	circumference/499 centimetres (196 in)
V.	White willow	1	Between park terraces	circumference/519 centimetres (204 in)
VI.	European oak	1	High school property at 8 Dąbrowskiego street	circumference/367 centimetres (144 in)
VII.	Red oak	1	High school property at 8 Dąbrowskiego street	circumference/269 centimetres (106 in)
VIII.	English Yew	1	At 14 Wały Jagiellońskie	16 metres (52 ft) high
IX.	European beech	3	At 12 Wały Jagiellońskie	largest circumference/299 centimetres (118 in)
X.	Large-leaved lime	1	At 12 Wały Jagiellońskie	largest circumference/264 centimetres (104 in)

== Gallery ==
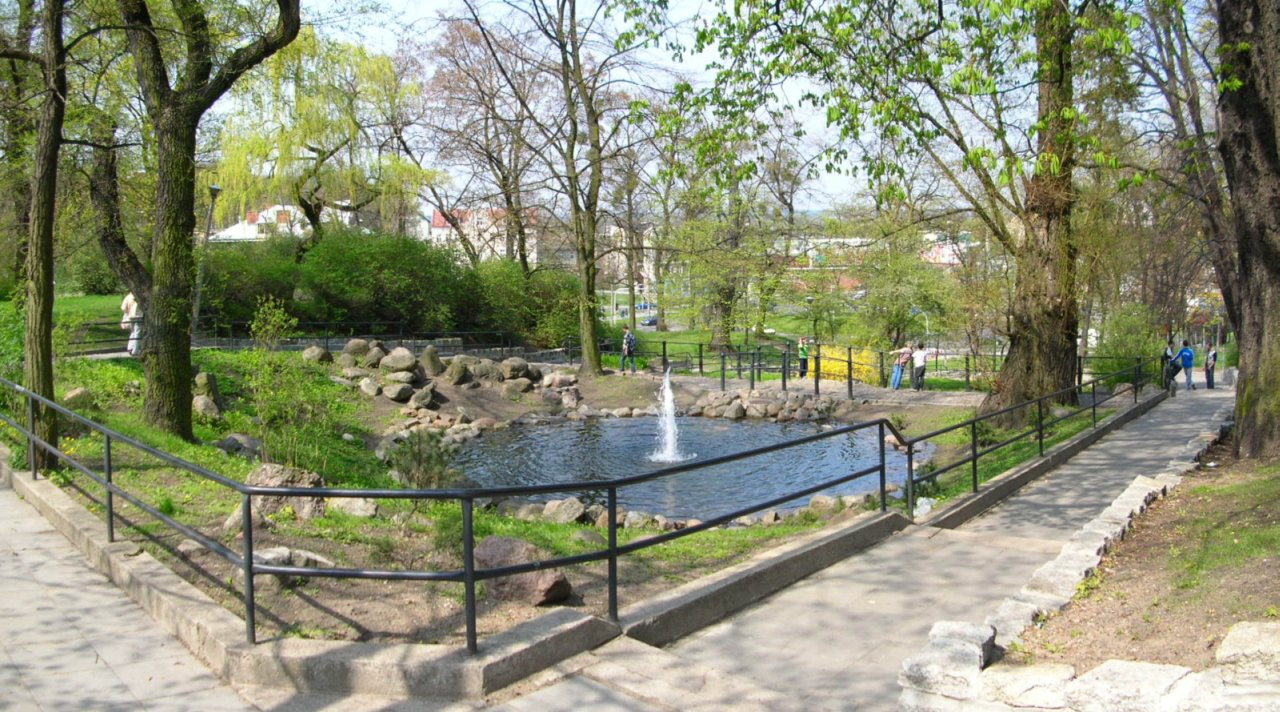
The upper pond and fountain

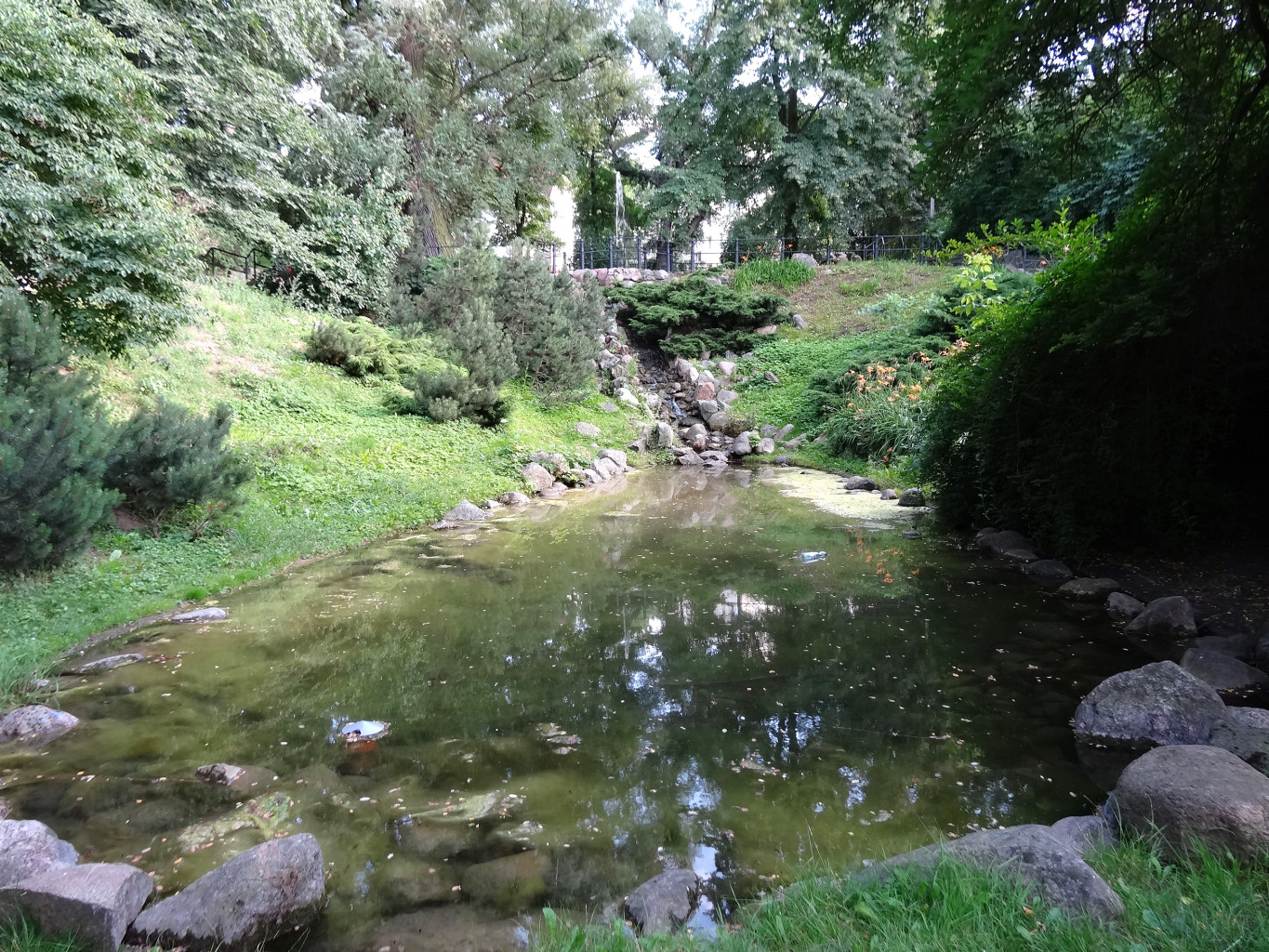
Cascade and lower pond

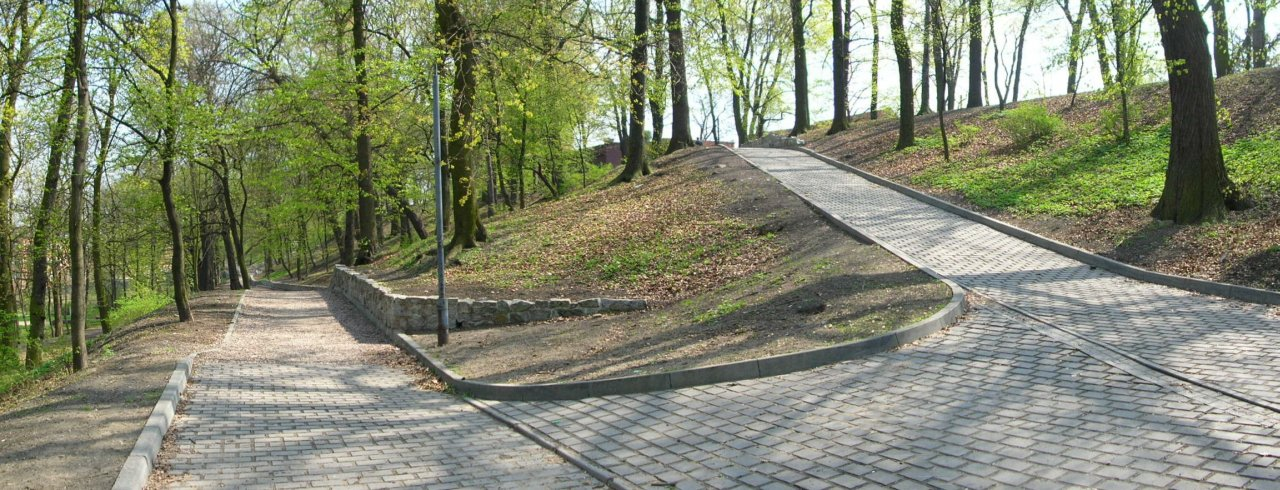
Park trail

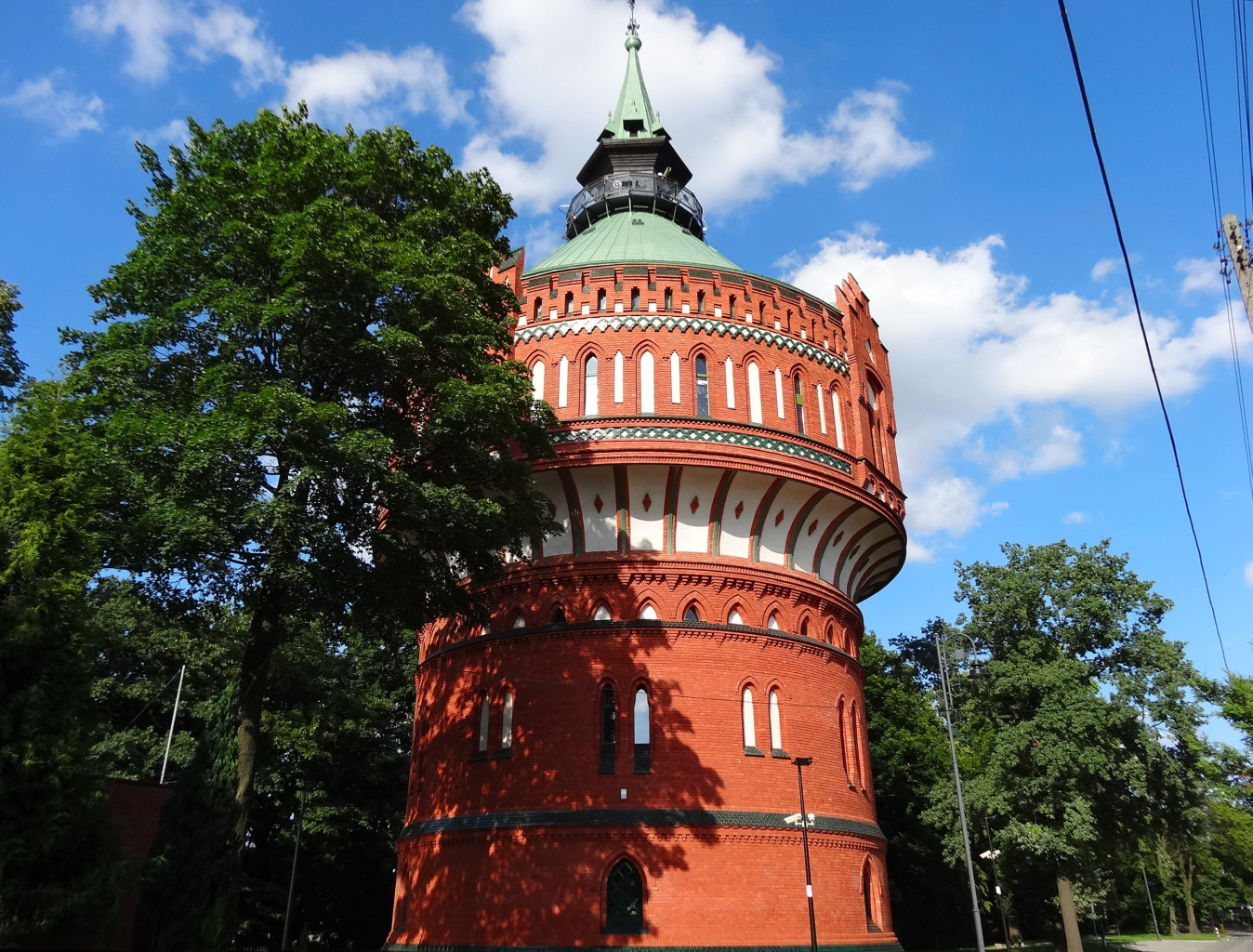
The 1900 water tower

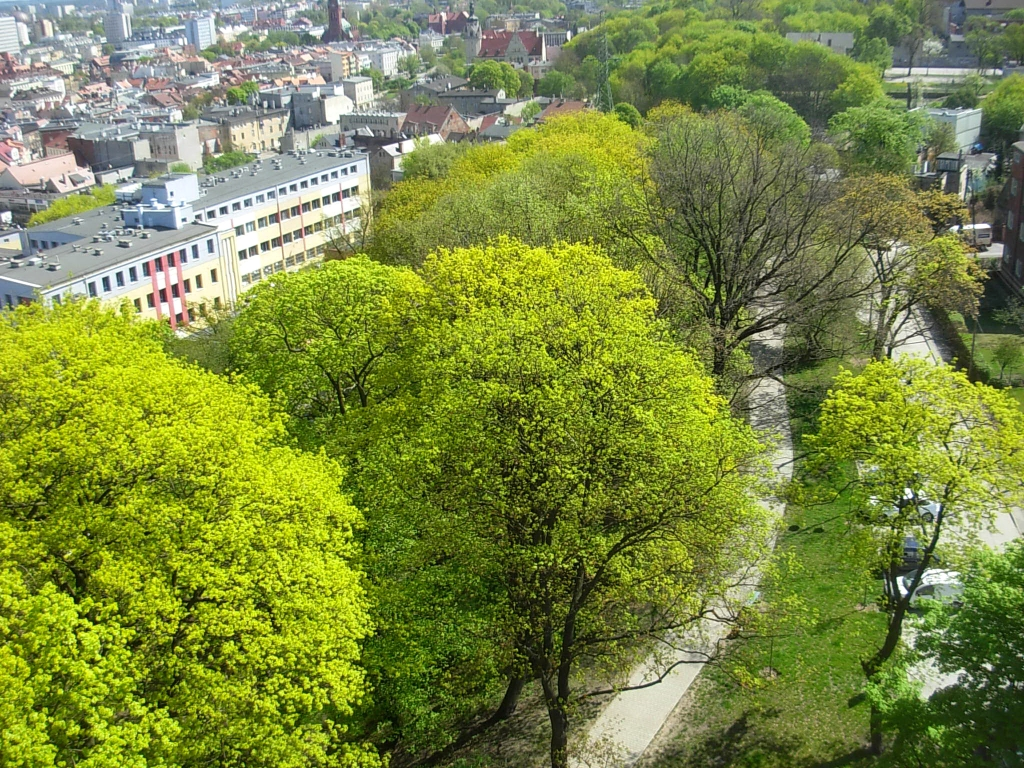
Park from the water tower observation deck

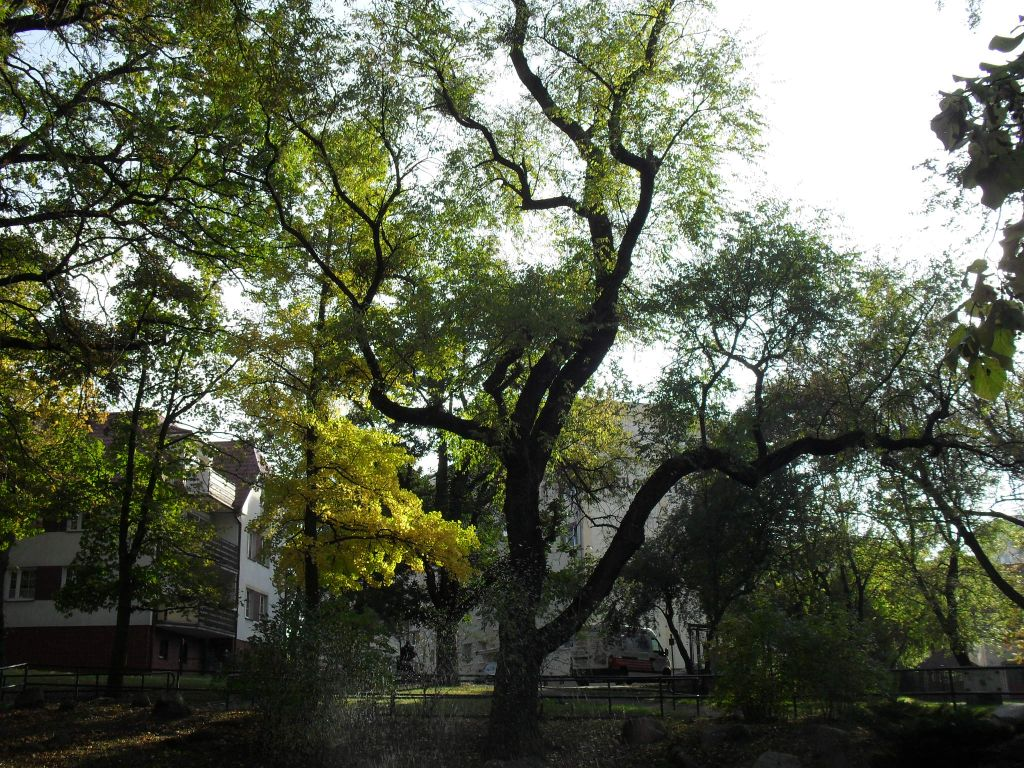
The protected ginkgo

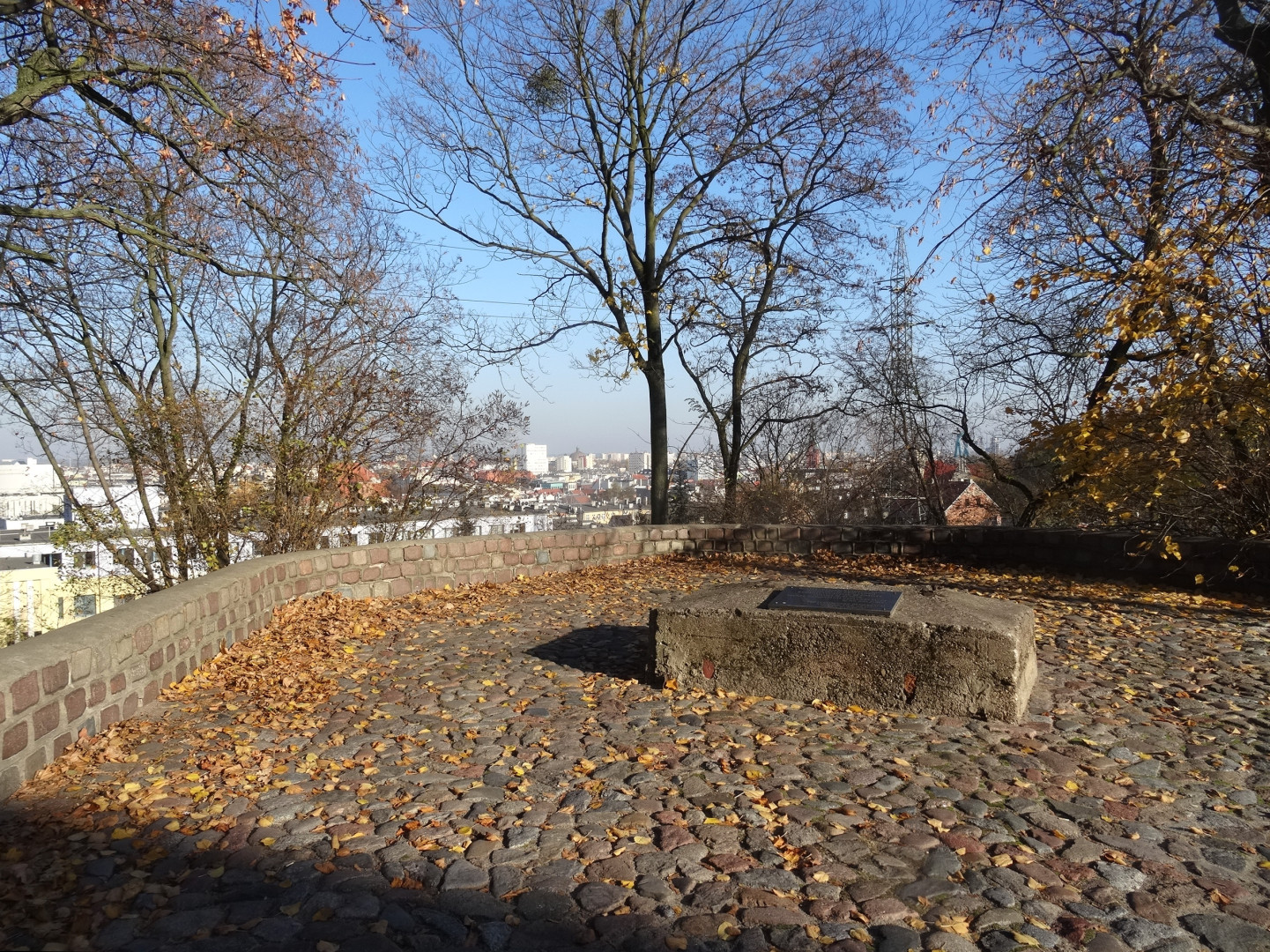
Memorial plaque of the 1956 radio tower action

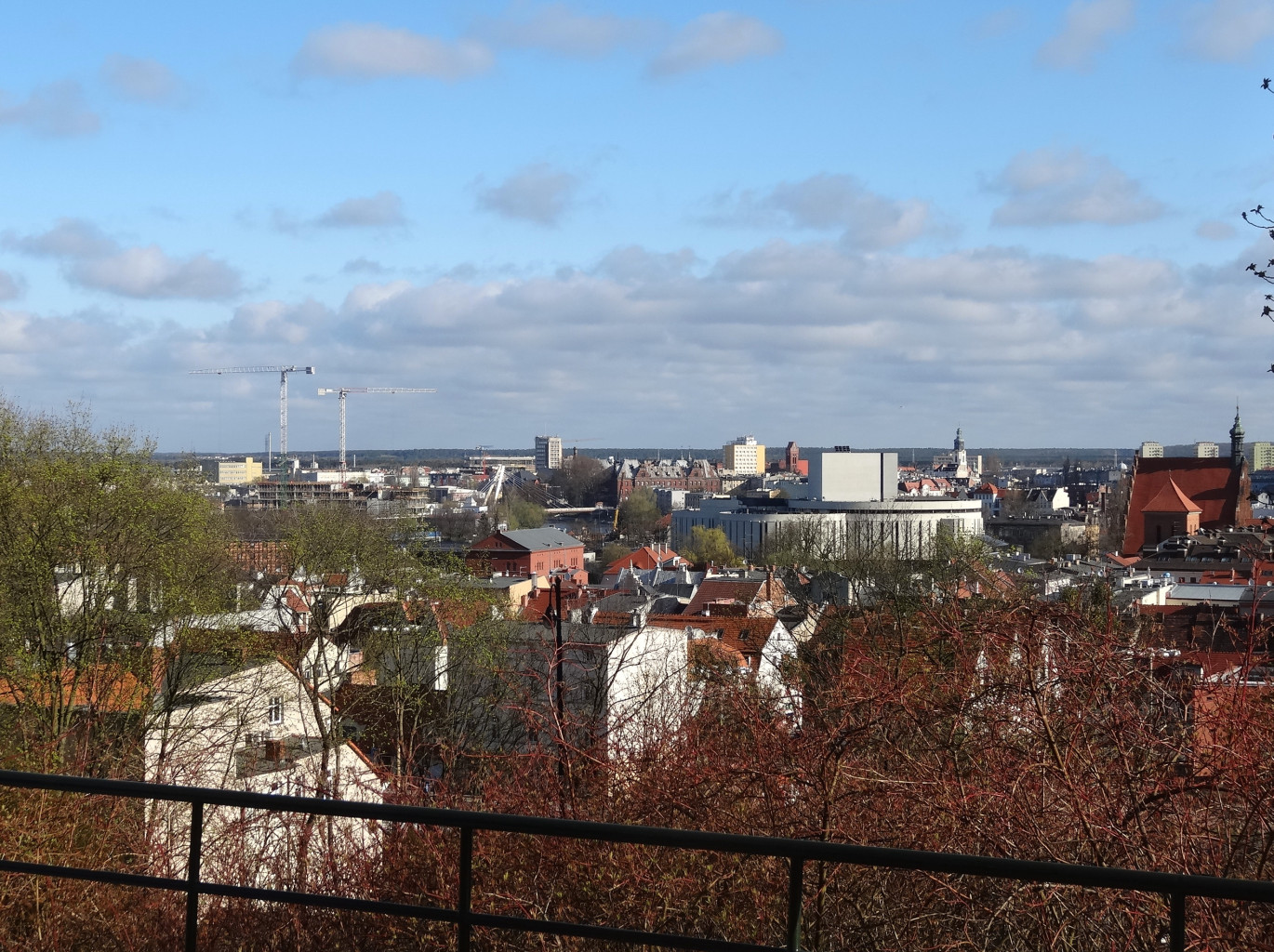
View of Opera Nova from Aleja Górska

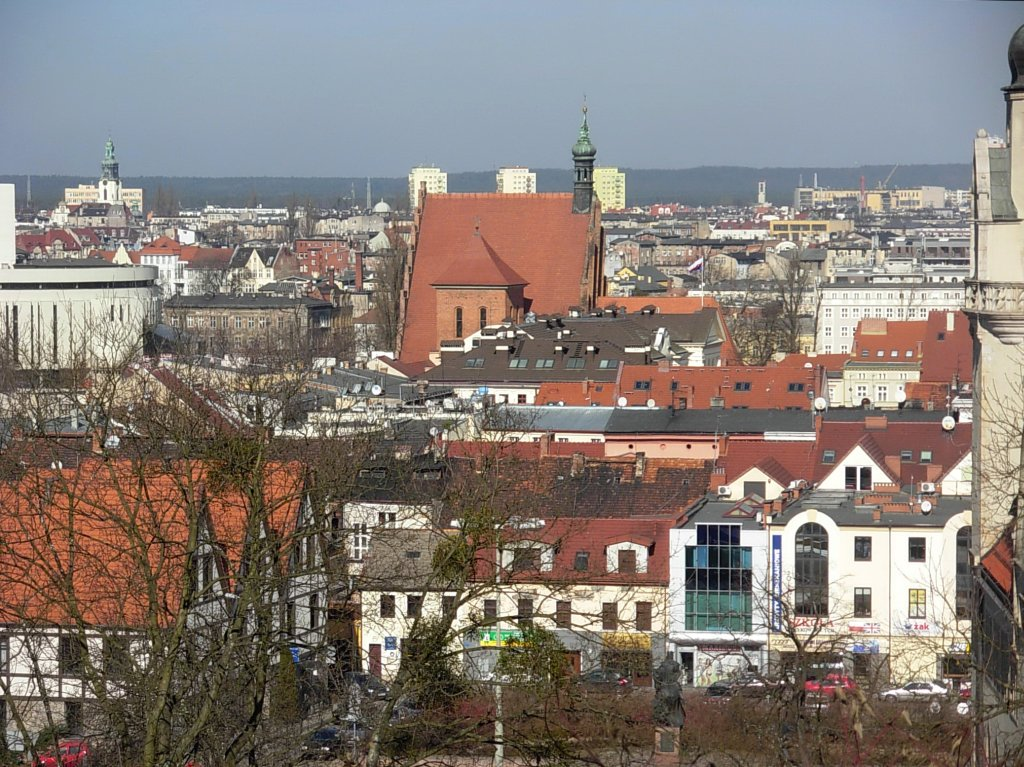
View of Bydgoszcz Cathedral from Aleja Górska

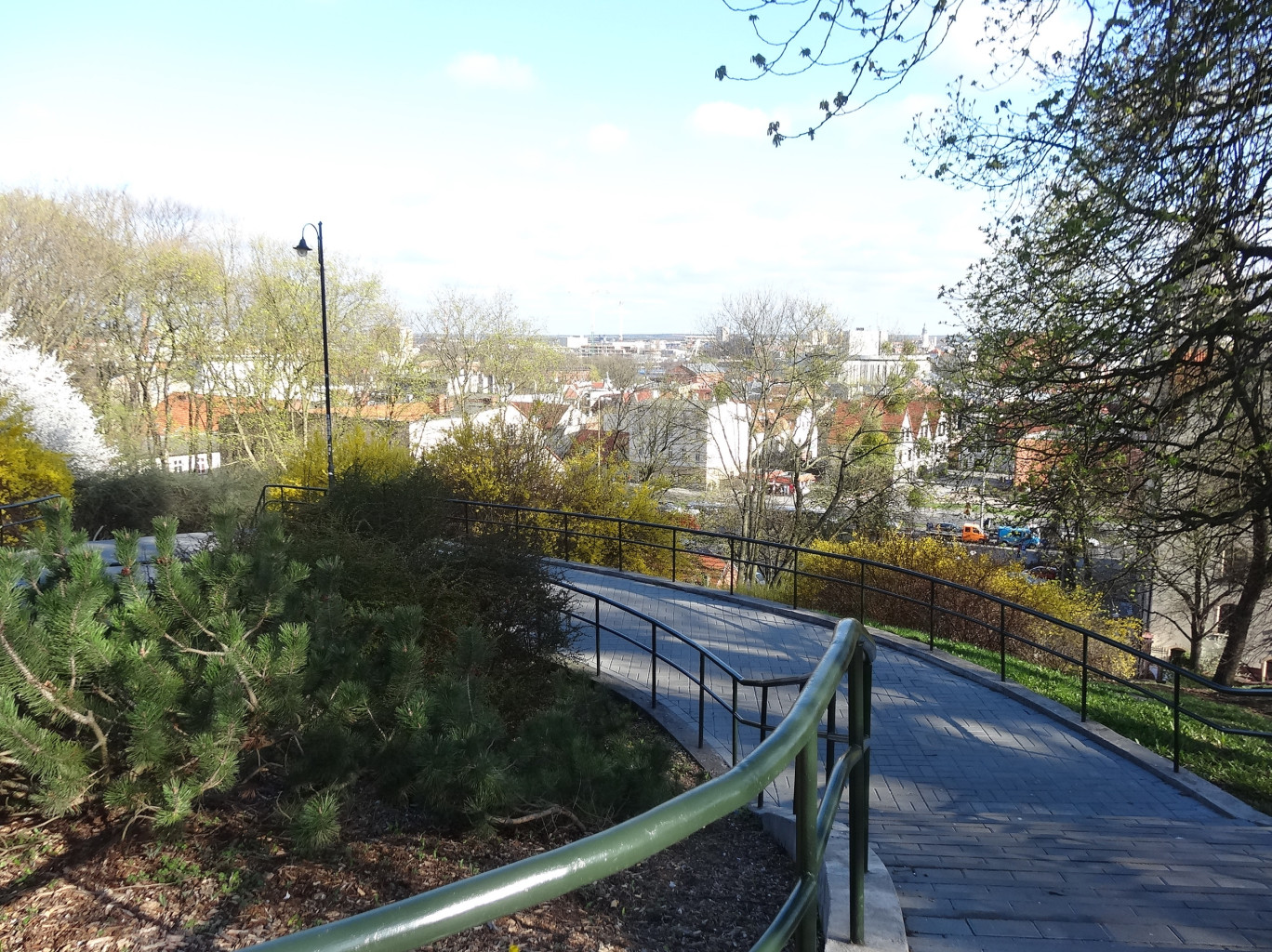
Renovated stairs at Aleja Górska

== See also ==
- Bydgoszcz
- The old water tower of Bydgoszcz
- Park on Wolności Hill

== Bibliography ==
- Bręczewska-Kulesza, Daria (2015). Rola historycznej i współczesnej zieleni publicznej w życiu miast na przykładzie Bydgoszczy (in Polish). Bydgoszcz: Czasopismo Kultura-Historia-Globalizacja.
- Pastuszewski, Stefan (1996). Bydgoska Gospodarka Komunalna. Praca zbiorowa (in Polish). Bydgoszcz: Instytut Wydawniczy „Świadectwo”. ISBN 83-85860-37-1.
- Kaja, Renata (1995). Bydgoskie pomniki przyrody (in Polish). Bydgoszcz: Instytut Wydawniczy „Świadectwo”. ISBN 83-85860-32-0.
- Kuczma, Rajmund (1995). Zieleń w dawnej Bydgoszczy (in Polish). Bydgoszcz: Instytut Wydawniczy „Świadectwo”.
- Umiński, Janusz (1996). Bydgoszcz-Przewodnik (in Polish). Bydgoszcz: Wydawnictwo Uczelniane Wyższej Pomorskiej Szkoły Turystyki i Hotelarstwa w Bydgoszczy.
