= Freedom Hill Park =

Urban Park in Bydgoszcz, Poland

Coordinates: 53°7′13″N 17°59′22″E

- Polish: Park na Wzgórzu Wolności
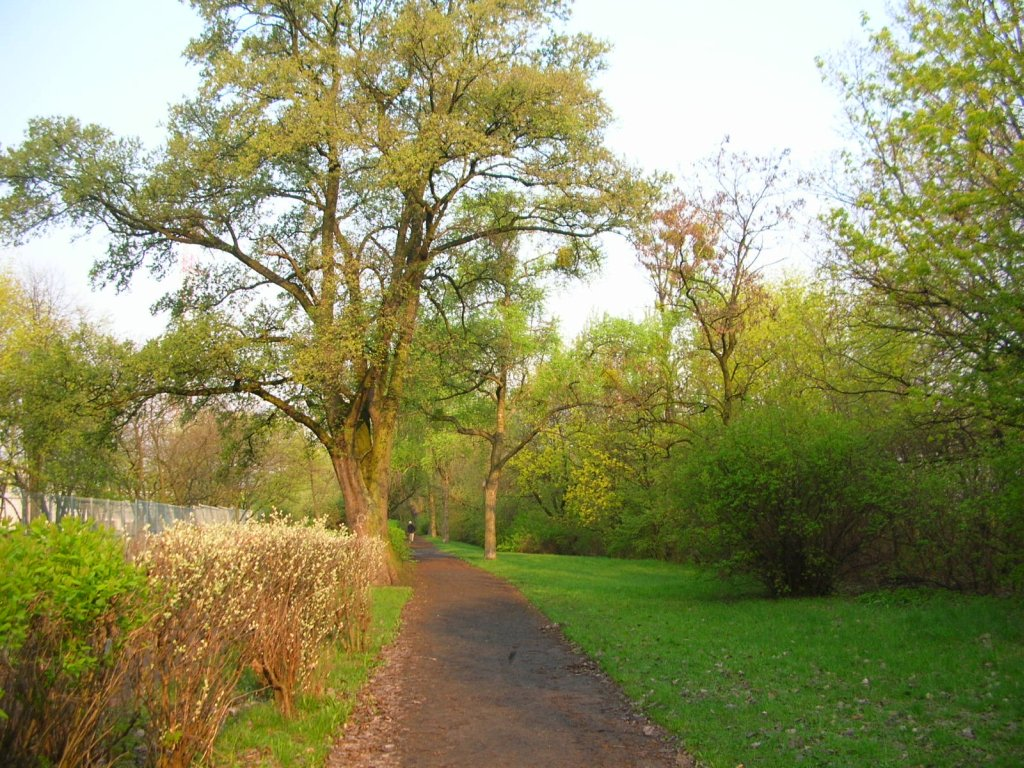
- A view of the park on Wolności Hill
- Interactive map of Freedom Hill Park
- Location: Bydgoszcz, Poland
- Area: 9.91 hectares (99,100 m^{2})
- Created: 1911
- Owner: City of Bydgoszcz

The Freedom Hill Park (Polish: Park na Wzgórzu Wolności) is a city green area covering almost 10 ha (25 acres), located on the heights of Bydgoszcz, Poland.

== Location ==
The park covers a rectangular area, 100 metres (330 ft) by 1,000 metres (3,300 ft), surrounded by Kujawska, Toruńska and general Stanisława Grzmot-Skotnickiego streets, in the Wolności Hill district (Polish: osiedle Wzgórze Wolności) of Bydgoszcz. The park is laid on two hills, south of the city, 25 metres (82 ft) to 30 metres (98 ft) above the Brda river valley.

The lower elevation can be accessed by climbing stairs either from Kujawska street in the west or from Toruńska Street in the east. Conversely, many paths and trails lead to the upper hillock. In the western area of the park has been built in 2001 the seat of the local television channel TVP3 Bydgoszcz.

== History ==
The park was founded in 1911–1913, by incorporating the existing natural forest standing on the southern hilly terrain of Bromberg, geologically designated as urstromtal. The park was designed as a mountain forest area, recalling the Tatra Mountains. At its inception, it covered 7 hectares (17 acres). On 25 May 1913 a Bismarck tower was unveiled in the park, based on a design by Paul Walther, an architect from Berlin. This Bismarck Turm gave its name to the elevation as Bismarck Hill (German: Bismarckhöhe). The massive squat stone building was 25 metres (82 ft) high; it housed, among others, a memorial room to Otto von Bismarck who died in 1898, and its highest observation deck offered a remarkable panorama over the entire city. At the recreation of Polish state, the edifice, stripped from its commemorative plaques, was renamed Freedom Tower (Polish: wieża Wolności), giving the name to the site as Park on Wolności Hill. A controversial project of converting the tower into a chapel crowned by a grand cross was drawn: the polemic raised by the scheme added to its cost led to the dismissal of the plan. On 12 April 1928 Bydgoszcz city council passed a contentious resolution on the liquidation of the tower. A month later (16 May) the ex-Bismarck tower was blown up using 30 tons of TNT. Nowadays, the only elements left of this building are the stairs from Toruńska street (between 86 and 88) and the cemented square platform in the Cemetery of Bydgoszcz Heroes.

The years following, the park was redesigned by planting pines and silver birches. In 1938, an inventory listed the following species growing in the park:

- Bog pines;
- Norway spruces;
- Silver birches;
- Siberian dwarf pines;
- Savin junipers.

During the occupation, Nazis authorities restored the name Bismarckhöhe, while the trail and the park, called Höhenweg, extended farther east, reaching present day's Aleja Jana Pawła II.

After World War II, the Cemetery of Bydgoszcz Heroes was set up in the middle of the park to gather all the victims of executions from the city and its surroundings.

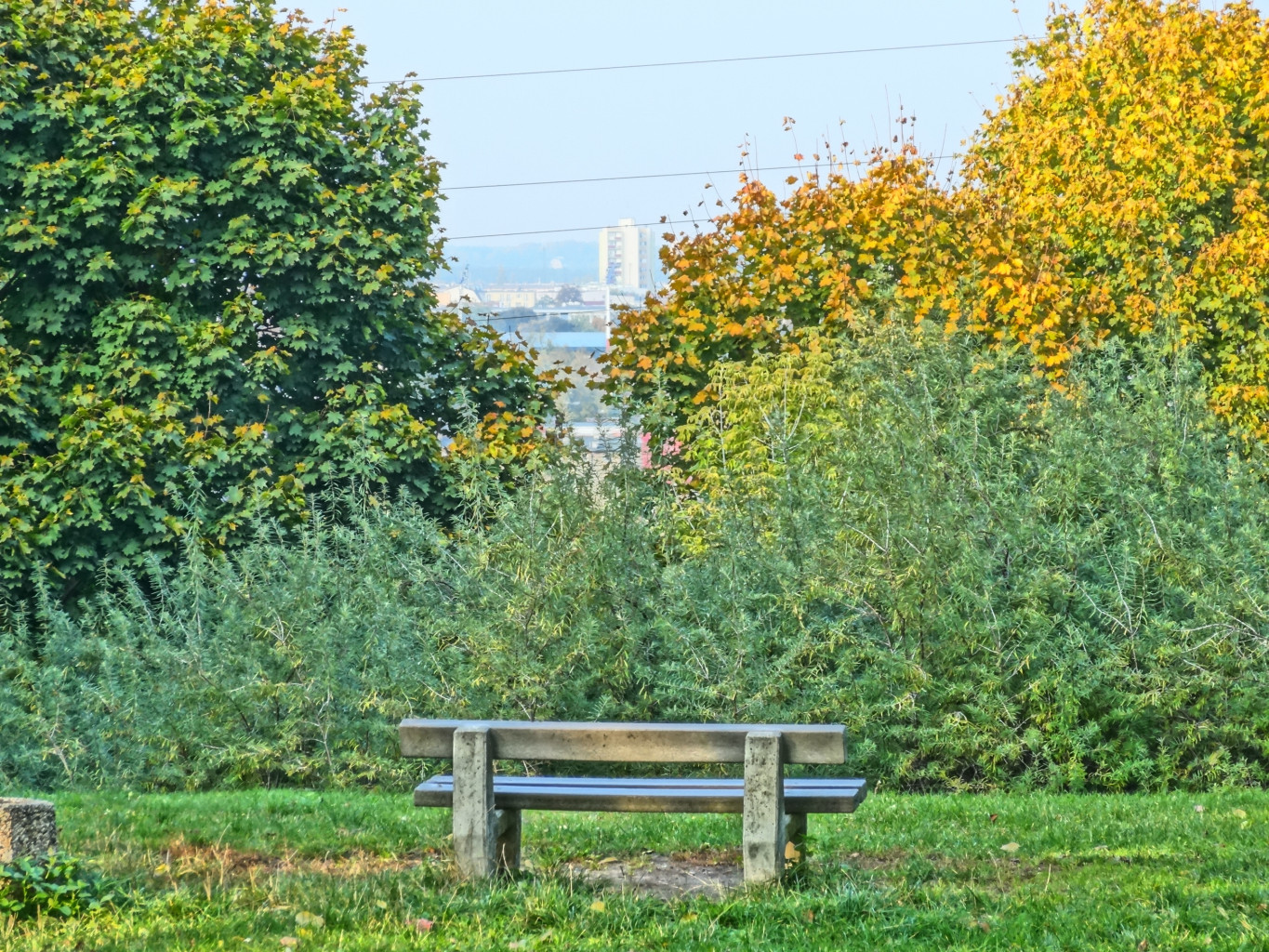
Bench with a view on the old town

From 1974 to 1980, on the eastern side of the park, the provincial hospital Jan Biziel has been erected. Today, the path does not go further east, wandering between too many private properties.

A revitalization project was prepared in 2016 and carried out between 2017 and 2019, associated to an EU funding. Works included, among others:

- planting meadows, trees, shrubs, herbs and flowers (681 species in total);
- installing small architecture elements (e.g. benches, information boards, nest boxes for birds and bats);
- replacing the lighting system;
- building new paths for pedestrians and bicycles.

The project also comprised the construction of new stairs leading down to Kujawska street.

Bydgoszcz council officially bestowed to the park the name Park Wolności thanks to a resolution passed on June 26, 2019.

== An element in the historic green ensemble of the city southern hill ==
As early as the mid-19th century, the park was subsumed in a larger ensemble located on the southern hilly side of Bromberg. It represented a 6 kilometres (3.7 mi) long walking trail, albeit partially interrupted, from where you could appreciate the panorama upon the city.

At that time, the ring of hills was crisscrossed by dry creeks and paths leading the parks. They were identified through time as:

- Park on Prince hill (German: Prinzehöhe) (est. 1834), located between present day Lubelska and Seminaryjna streets. On 15 June 1835 Frederick William IV of Prussia, then crown prince to the Prussian throne, paid a visit to the park, giving it its name. Surviving plots can be found today along the green slope facing Seminaryjna street;

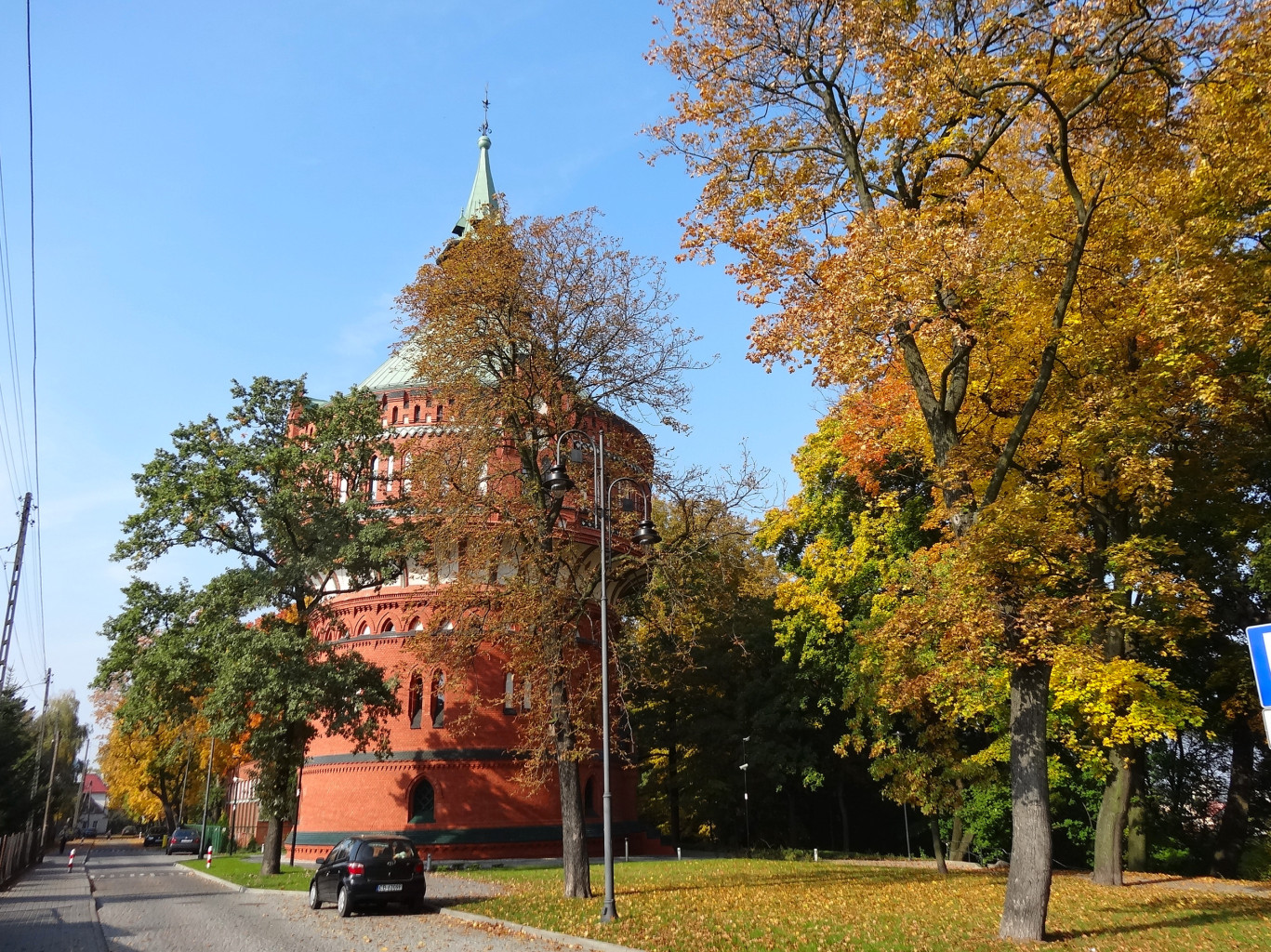
The old water tower at Henryk Dąbrowski Park

- Park on Naumann Hill (est. 1870), located between Szubińska, Seminaryjna and Wysoka streets. This 7 hectares (17 acres) park was created by Johann Gottlieb Naumann who was at the time president of Bromberg administrative region and chairman of the Society for the Embellishment of Bromberg. He gave his name to the height (German: Naumannshöhe). In 1907, the park was divided between the newly built Catholic seminary and the deaconesses hospital established in 1885 (today's Regional Pulmonology Center);
- Henryk Dąbrowski Park, called Park on Wissmann hill till 1920;
- Aleja Górska, created in 1890 under the name Circular park (Polish: Planty Okrężne);
- Park on Wolności Hill (1913);
- Viewing points trails along hills on Wyżyny and Kapuściska districts (1950–1980).

Today, the path along Bydgoszcz hilly southern slopes offers a panorama of the city from Henryk Dąbrowski Park to Aleja Górska and Kujawska street. The trail continues east, up the stairs to the current park, reaching Jan Biziel hospital: further eastern segments of this panorama walking path are located in Wyżyny and Kapuściska districts.

Several dozen species of trees and shrubs grow in the park.

Two trees have been listed as Polish Natural Monument:

- an English oak with a trunk circumference of 343 centimetres (135 in) (2011). It has been named Oak of the Pomeranian Military District (Polish: Dąb Pomorskiego Okręgu Wojskowego) and stands at the level of Slowiańska street;
- a horse-chestnut with a trunk circumference of 277 centimetres (109 in) (2014), at 30 Toruńska street.

== Cemetery of Bydgoszcz Heroes ==
The cemetery was founded in 1946 on a plot of 0.66 ha of the park, where used to stand the Bismarck tower, a symbol of Prussian nationalism, blown up in 1928.

The graveyard houses 1169 inhabitants of Bydgoszcz, murdered during the Nazi occupation of the city. It includes the victims executed at the Old Market square, at the Valley of Death and in the surrounding forests. The corpses have been exhumed from 1946 to 1948 and solemnly buried there.

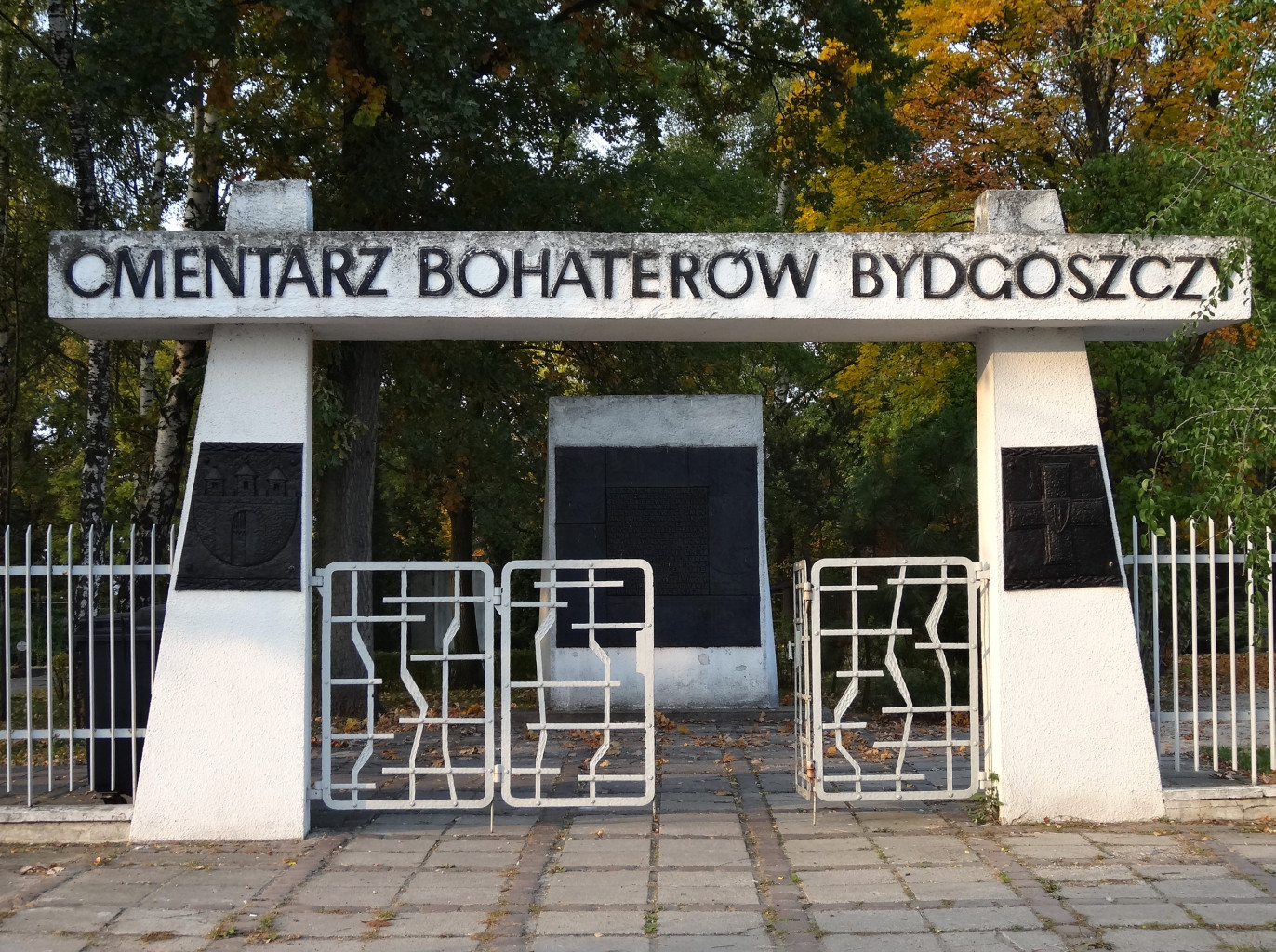
Graveyard gate entrance

In the centre of the necropolis stands an urn containing the ashes of 100 inhabitants of Bydgoszcz shot in the village of Otorowo in October 1939. One can find as well the symbolic graves of many local personages murdered by the Nazis:

- Leon Barciszewski and Bernard Śliwiński, presidents of Bydgoszcz during the interwar period;
- Konrad Fiedler, a journalist and councilor;
- Marian Maczuga, a merchant;
- Mieczysław Nawrowski, vice-president of Bydgoszcz;
- Józef Schulz, priest of the parish cathedral.

Nearby have been placed a commemorative plaque and an urn with the ashes of Bydgoszcz residents murdered in concentration camps.

There are also interred:

- city councilors (Kazimierz Beyer, Jan Góralewski and eng. Tadeusz Janicki) shot on 5 October 1939;
- several dozen teachers shot on 1 November 1939 in the Death Valley;
- priests, freelancers, craftsmen and workers.

In the northern part of the cemetery stands a cross with a field altar. In the north-west corner, a commemorative plaque on a pedestal (designed by Piotr Triebler) has been unveiled in 1949 in honor of the Jews of Bydgoszcz.

Close to the gate entrance one can find a monument uncovered in 1985, to celebrate 50 soldiers and officers from the Bydgoszcz Battalion of National Defense (Polish: Bydgoski Batalion Obrony Narodowej) murdered in Boryszew on 22 September 1939 for their alleged participation in Bydgoszcz Bloody Sunday (3 September 1939).

The gate is a donation from the craftsmen of Bydgoszcz in 1967: it is adorned with the Order of the Cross of Grunwald, Bydgoszcz coat of arms and two stylized crosses.

== Gallery ==
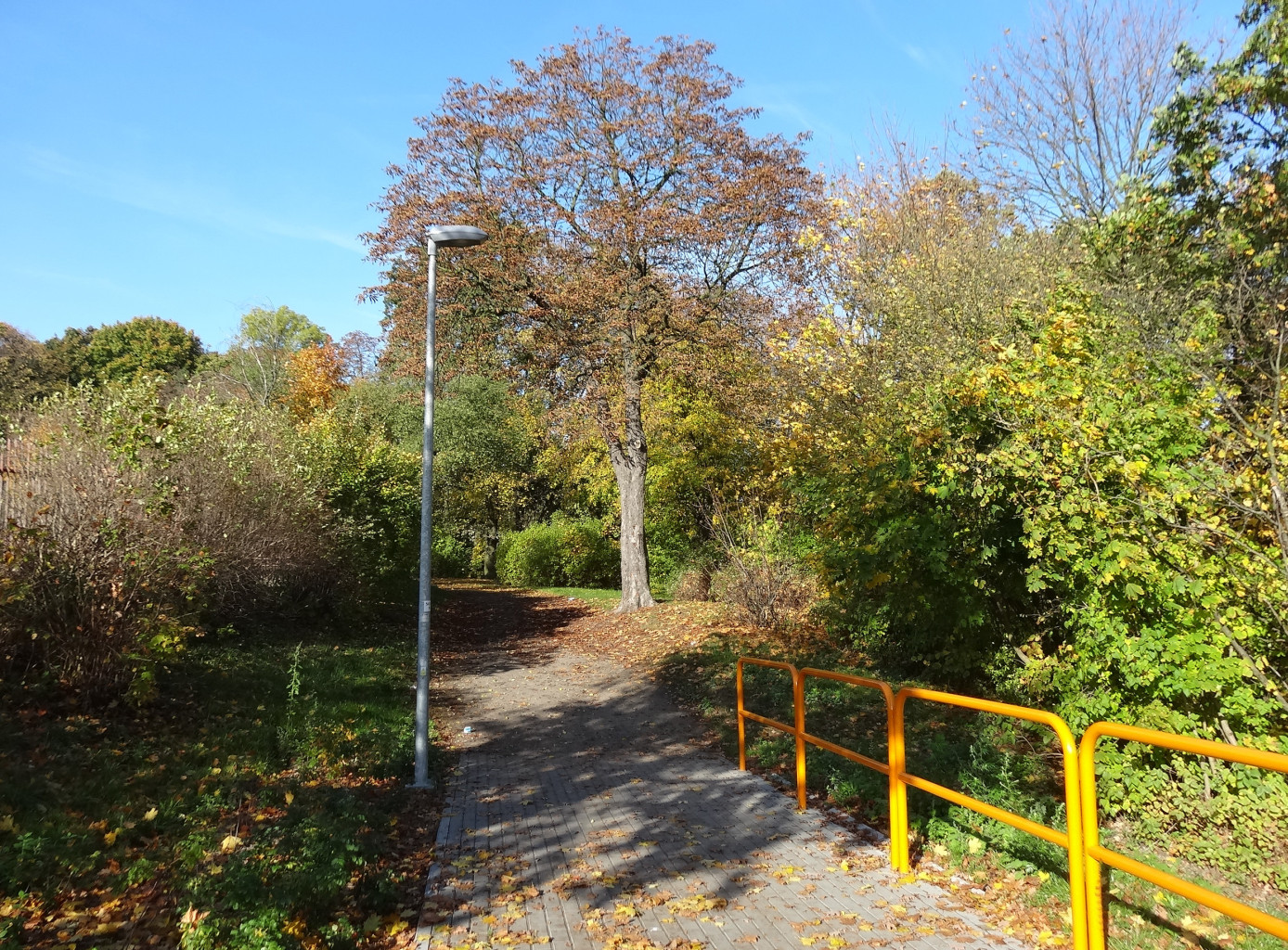
Park path

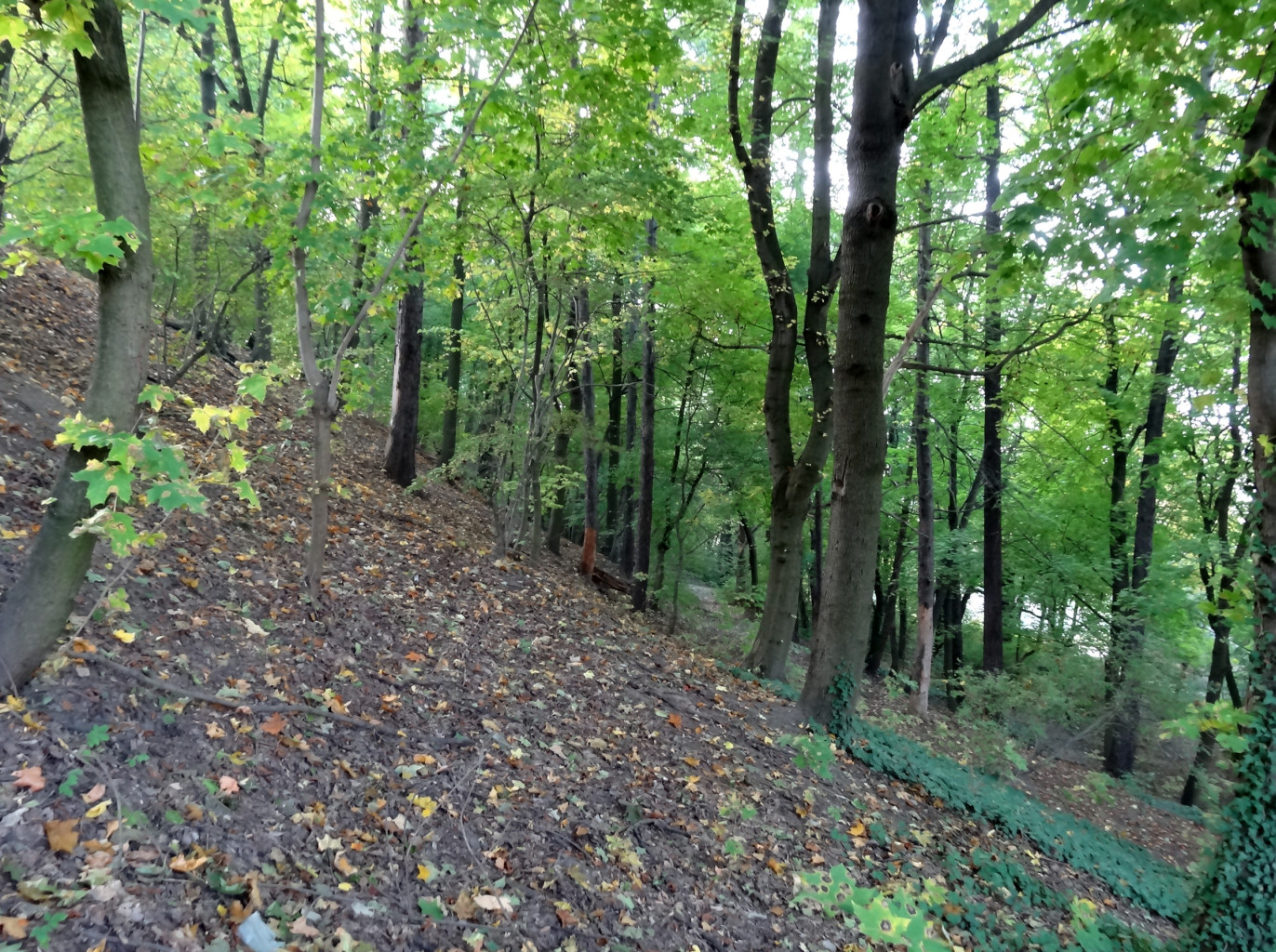
Park slope

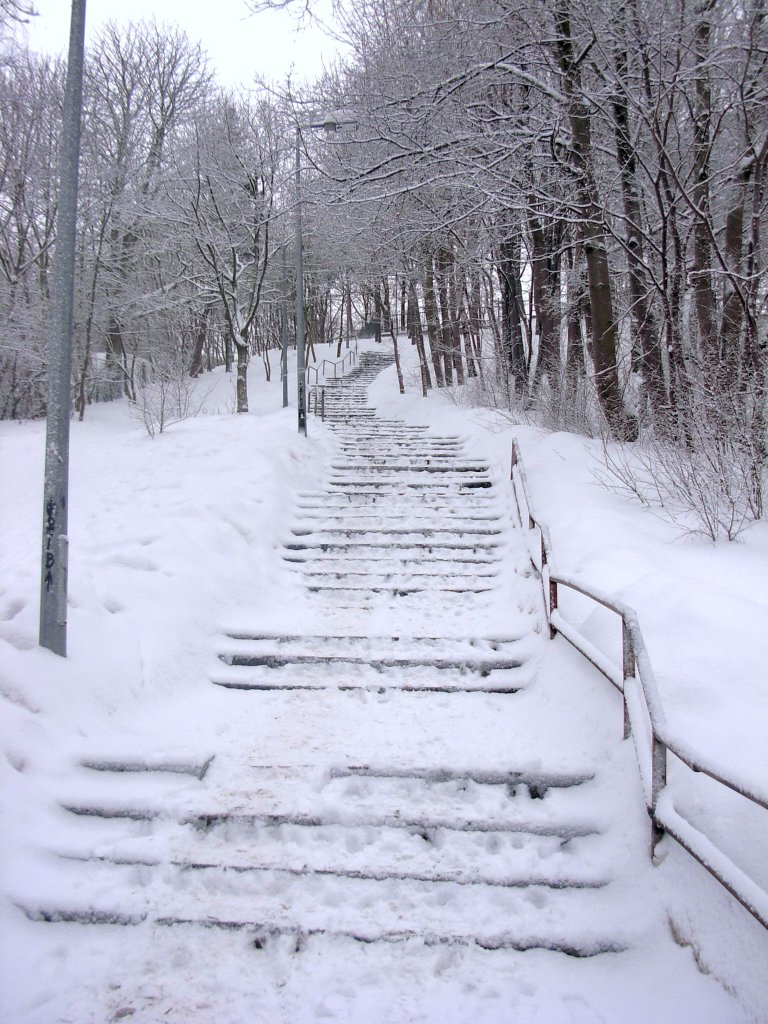
Stairs to the hill

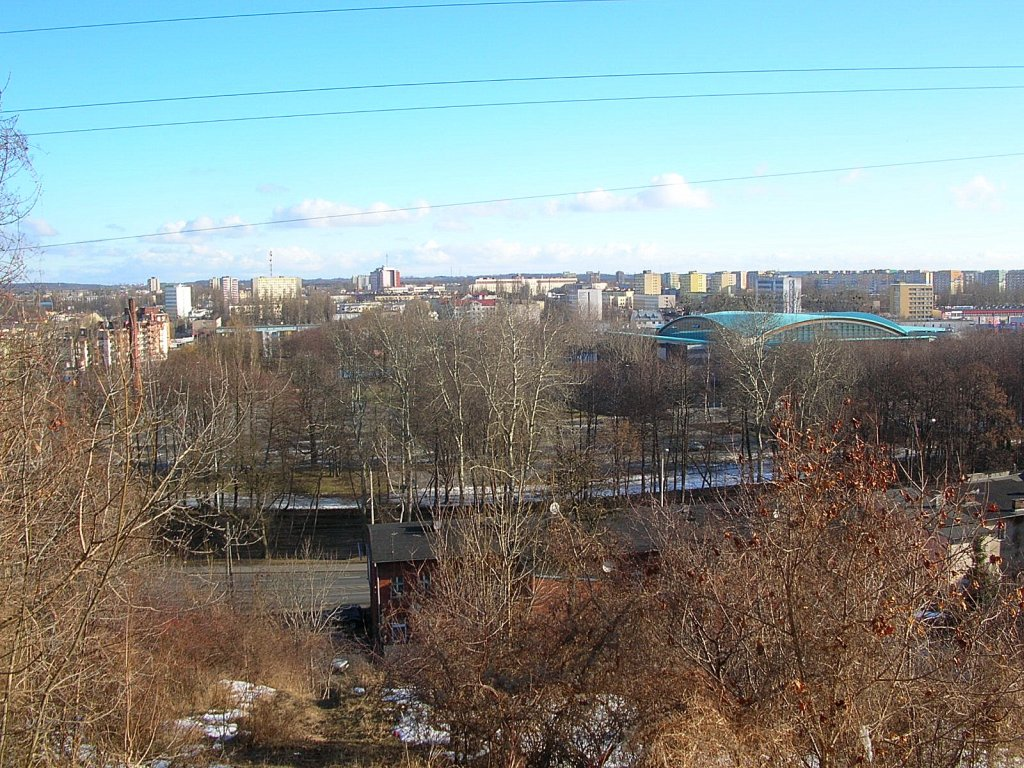
View of the city

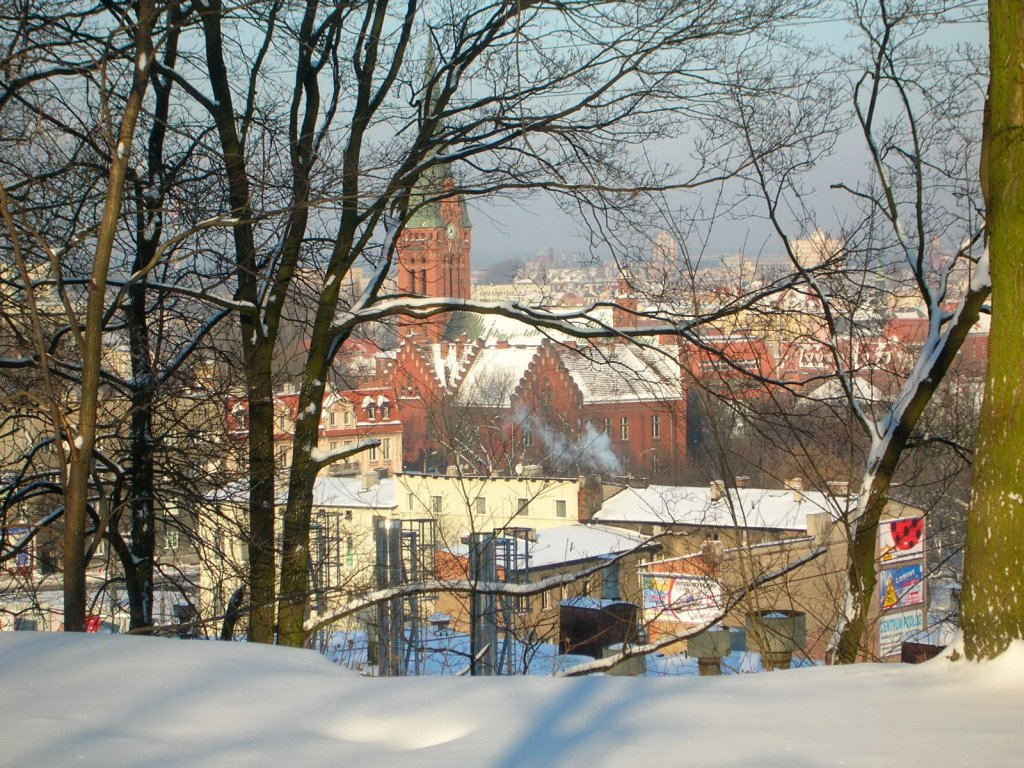
Winter, view of Saint Andrew Bobola's Church

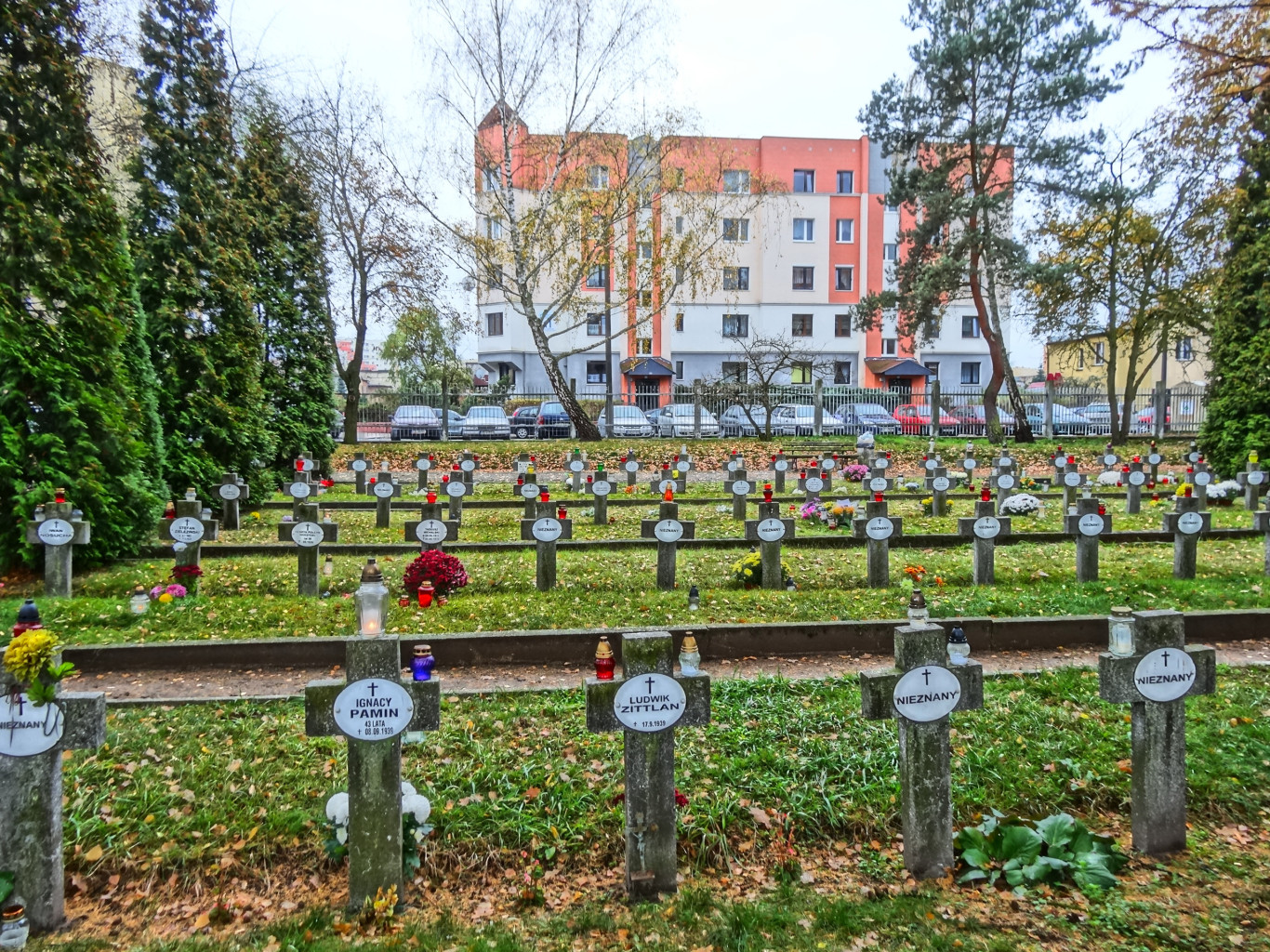
Heroes cemetery tombs

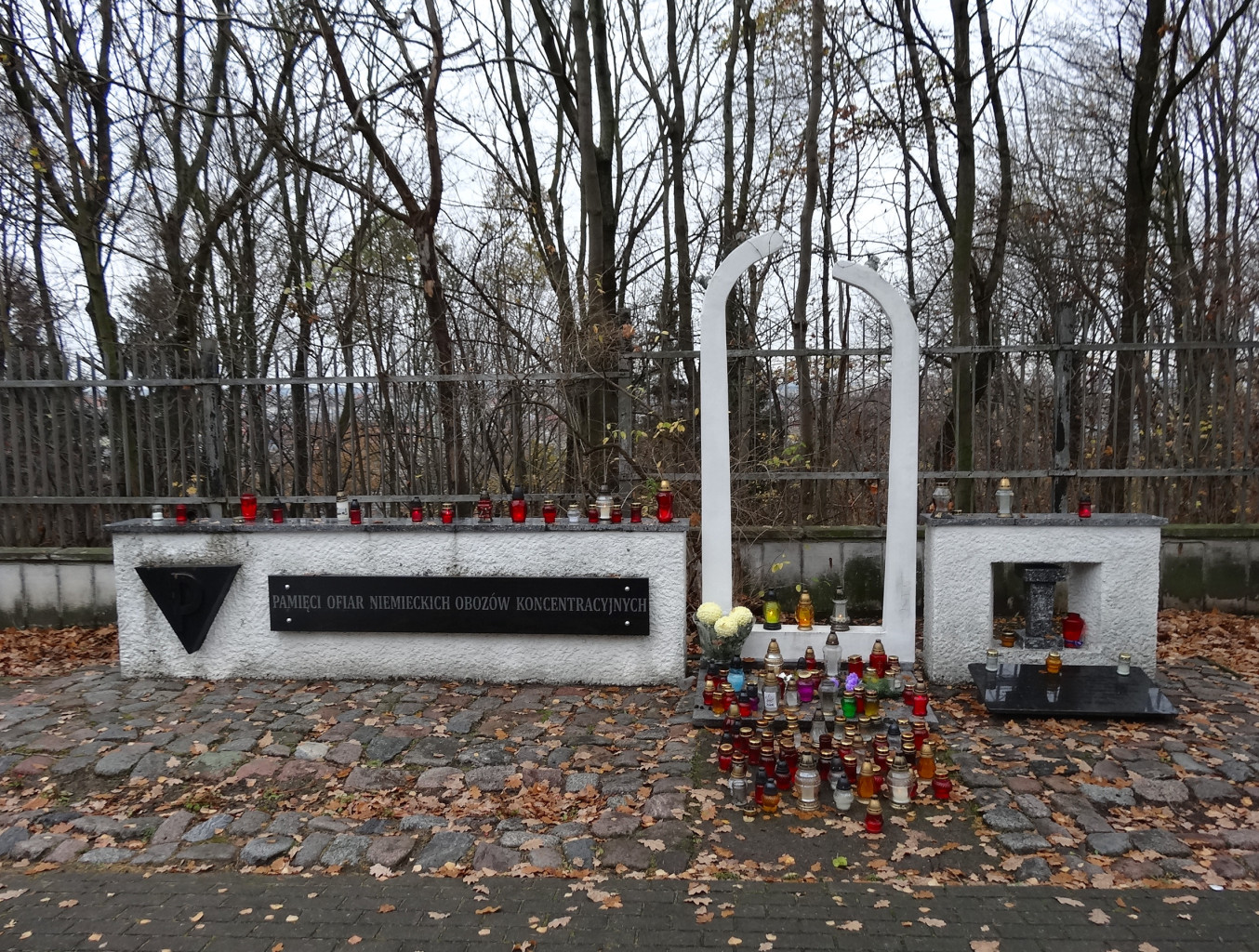
Monument to the victims fallen in concentration camps

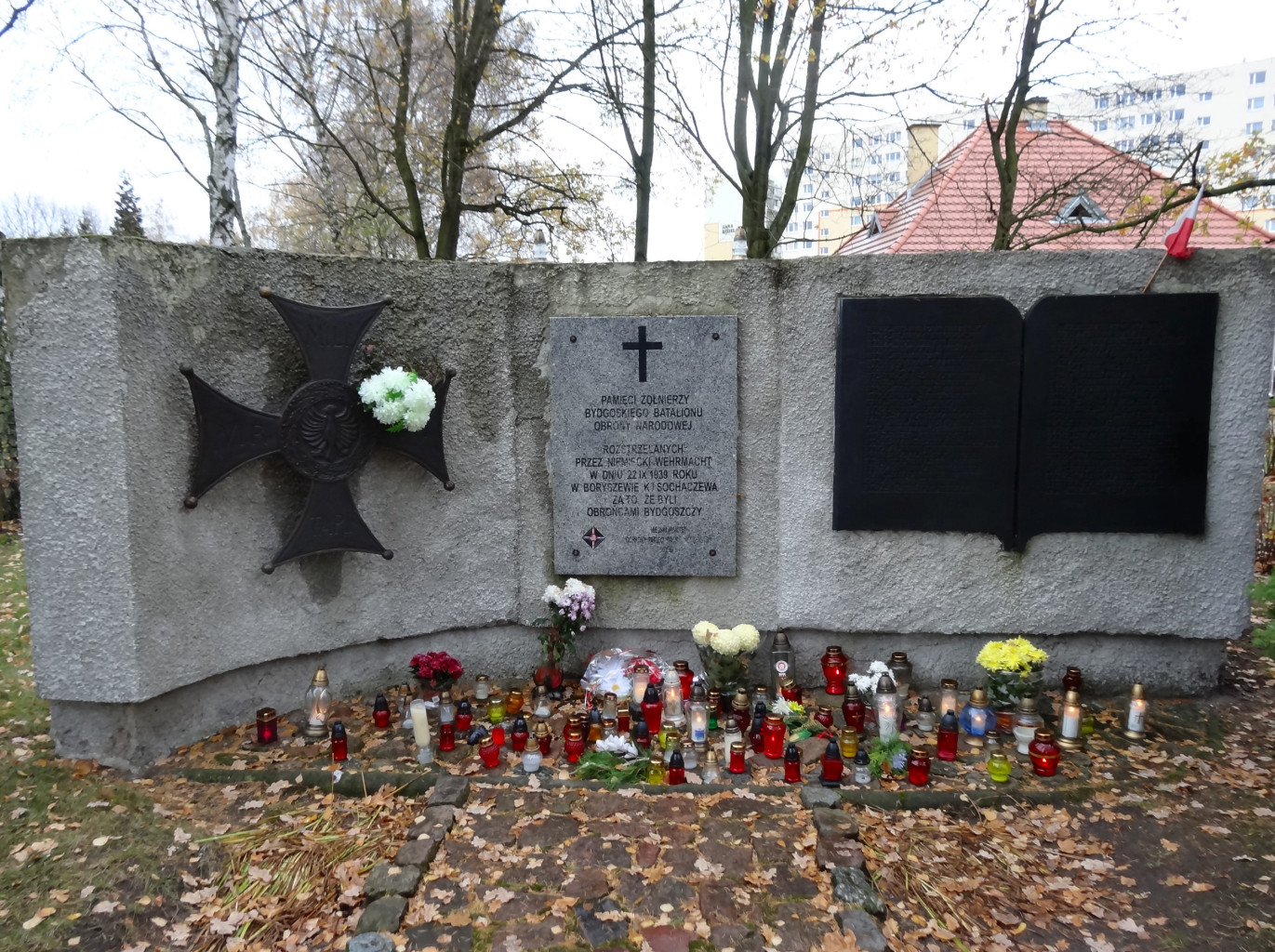
Monument to the Bydgoszcz Battalion of National Defense

== See also ==
- Bydgoszcz
- Henryk Dąbrowski Park and Aleja Górska
- Freedom Hill

== Bibliography ==
- Pastuszewski, Stefan (1996). Bydgoska Gospodarka Komunalna. Praca zbiorowa (in Polish). Bydgoszcz: Instytut Wydawniczy „Świadectwo”. ISBN 83-85860-37-1.
- Kaja, Renata (1995). Bydgoskie pomniki przyrody (in Polish). Bydgoszcz: Instytut Wydawniczy „Świadectwo”. ISBN 83-85860-32-0.
- Kuczma, Rajmund (1995). Zieleń w dawnej Bydgoszczy (in Polish). Bydgoszcz: Instytut Wydawniczy „Świadectwo”.
- Umiński, Janusz (1996). Bydgoszcz-Przewodnik (in Polish). Bydgoszcz: Wydawnictwo Uczelniane Wyższej Pomorskiej Szkoły Turystyki i Hotelarstwa w Bydgoszczy.
