= Królowej Jadwigi Street, Bydgoszcz =

Street, Bydgoszcz, Poland, end 19th century

Coordinates: 53°07′45″N 17°59′34″E

Królowej Jadwigi
Bydgoszcz
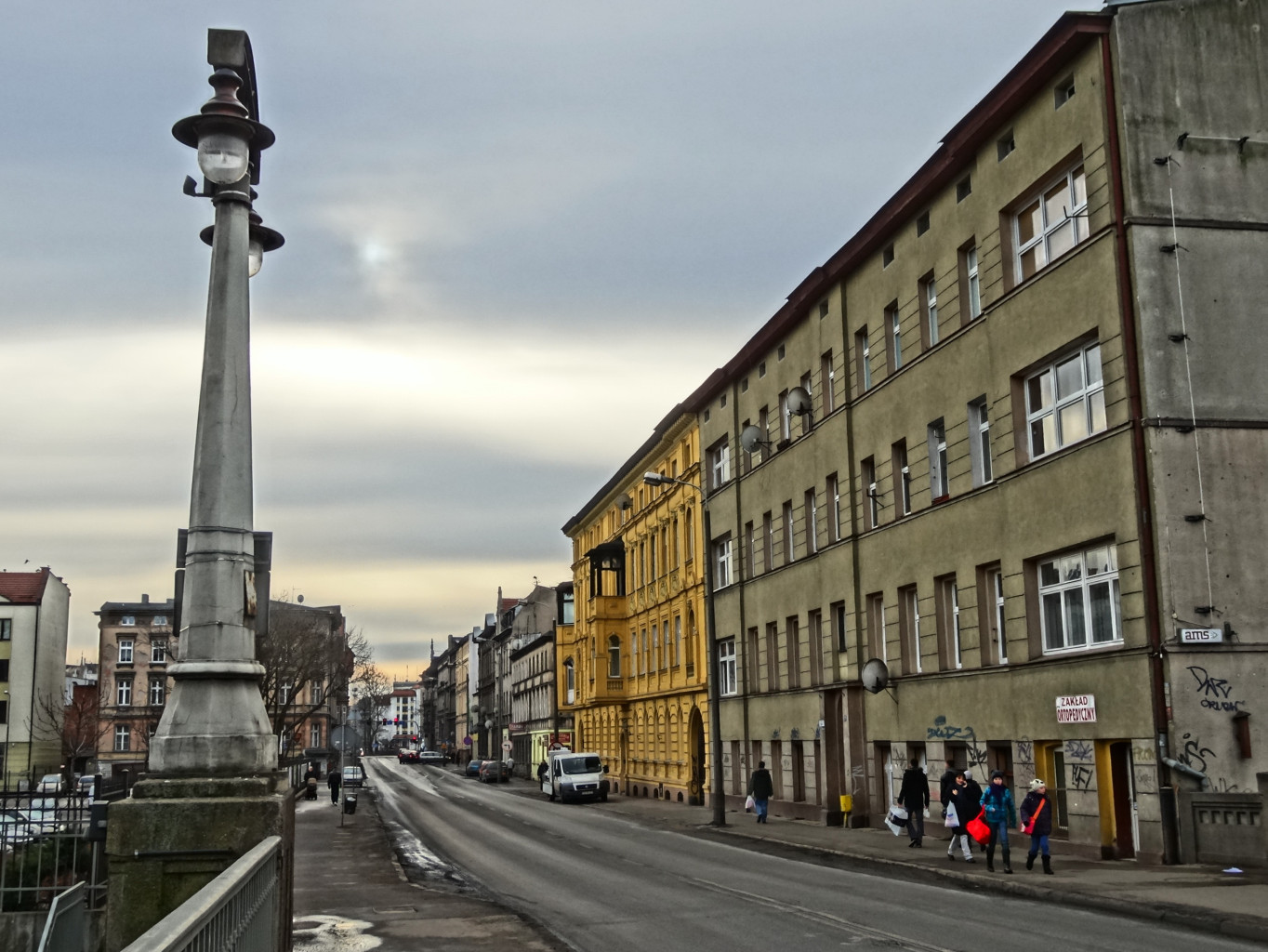
- View from the bridge

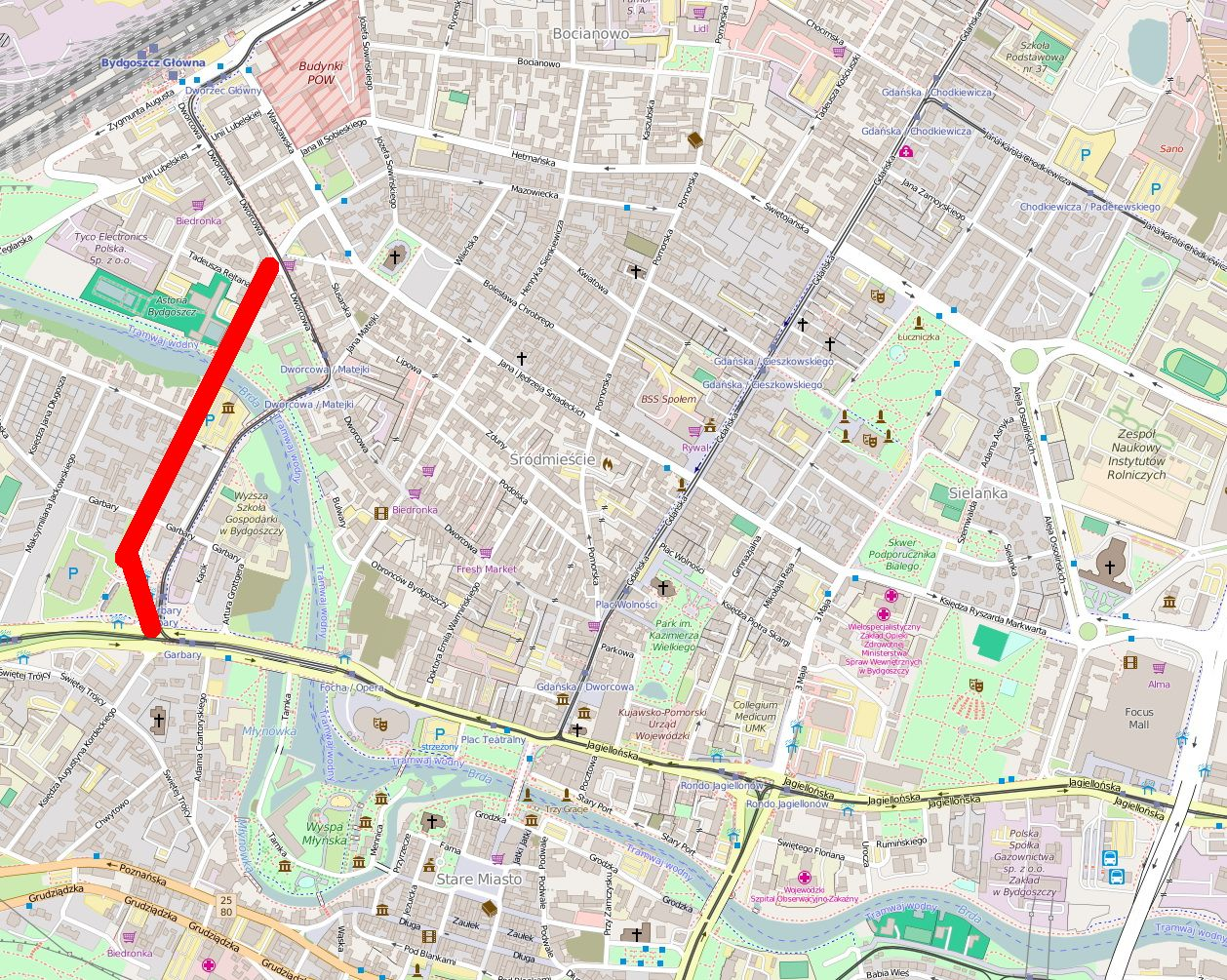
- Native name: Ulica Królowej Jadwigi w Bydgoszczy (Polish)
- Former name: Victoria Straße
- Part of: Bydgoszcz
- Owner: City of Bydgoszcz
- Length: 750 m (2,460 ft)
- Area: Downtown
- Location: Bydgoszcz, Poland

Królowej Jadwigi Street is a street located in Bydgoszcz, Poland. Many of its buildings are either registered on Kuyavian-Pomeranian Voivodeship heritage list, or part of Bydgoszcz local history.

== Location ==
The street is located in the western part of Bydgoszcz downtown district. It runs along a south–north axis, connecting Focha Street in the south to Dworcowa Street in the north. It crosses the Brda river via the Queen Jadwiga bridge (Polish: Most Królowej Jadwigi). The street is about 750 m long.

== History ==
The area was part of a former suburb called Okole that covered artificial islands from Brda river forks nearby Bydgoszcz Canal. In the first half of the nineteenth century, this area remained almost undeveloped. The situation changed in the second half of the 19th century, when industrial plants and residential complexes, following the Industrial Revolution in Prussia, were established. Królowej Jadwigi Street was then laid out in 1860 together with the development of Bydgoszcz thanks, in particular, to the rapid grow of the railway traffic. The thoroughfare connected then the train station area to the Bydgoszcz Canal.

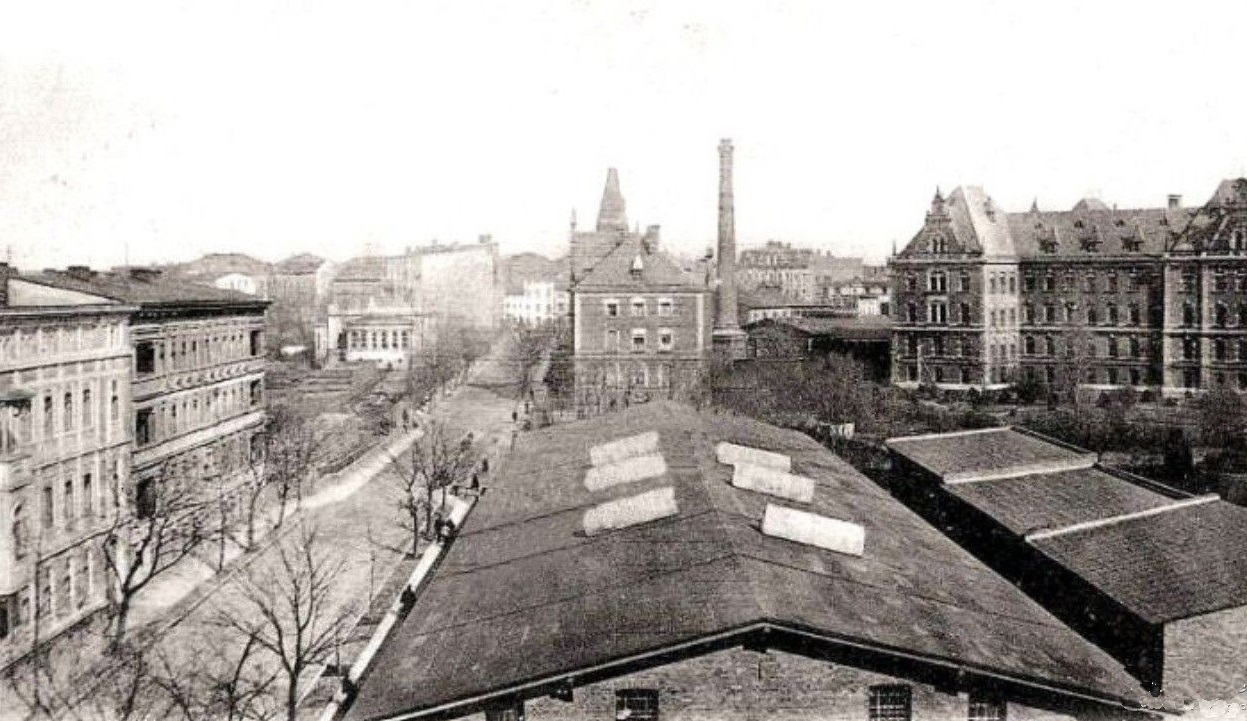
View of the street ca 1907

The street was first mentioned on maps of Bromberg from 1857 and 1876, under the name Victoria Straße, in reference to Empress Victoria, wife of German Emperor Frederick III. At the time, it did not extend to Focha Street to the south, but stopped at Albert Straße (today Garbary Street). The southern branch to Focha street was only realized after the second World War. By and large, most of the buildings have been erected in 25 years, from 1878 to 1903.

During street's inception, a bridge (Victoria Bridge German: Viktoriabrücke), was built between 1861 and 1865. When the Vistula Oder waterway was renovated at the beginning of the 20th century, the old Viktoriabrücke was re-constructed in 1913. It changed name to Królowej Jadwigi Bridge (Polish: Most Królowej Jadwigi) in 1920.

=== Naming ===
Through history, the street bore the following names:

- 19th century to 1920, Victoria Straße;
- 1920 to 1939, Ulica Królowej Jadwigi;
- 1939–1945, Victoria Straße;
- Since 1945, Ulica Królowej Jadwigi.

Current street name refers to Queen Jadwiga of Poland (1373–4 - 1399), who reigned as the first female monarch of the Kingdom of Poland from 1384 until her death in 1399.

== Main places and buildings ==
Tenement at 1, corner with Garbary Street

1890s

Eclecticism

Initially at Albertstraße 12, then Viktoria Straße 8, the tenement had been owned since 1878 by Gustav Modrakowski, a butcher, living at Feldstraße 7 (today's Jackowskiego street).

The corner building displays eclectic features on both facades. On the ground floor, bossage and round top windows topped by young female mascarons. On Królowej Jadwigi Street, the main portal is flanked by columns. The first floor boasts pedimented openings, with balustrade. On the corner, a bay window stretches through two levels, supported by ornamented brackets. On the right end of Królowej Jadwigi Street's facade, a slight avant-corps is underlined by two tall Corinthian order columns.

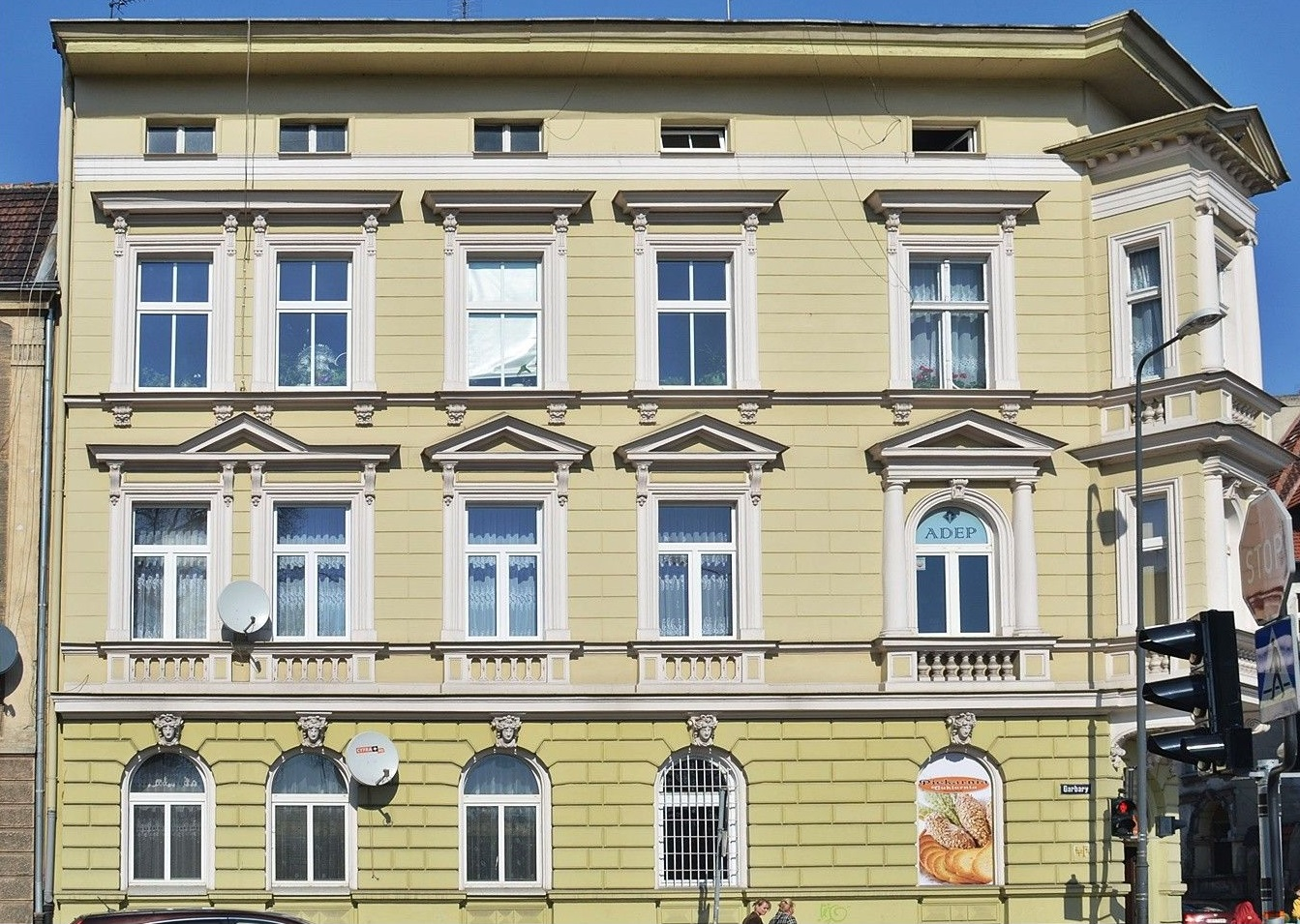
Frontage on Garbary Street

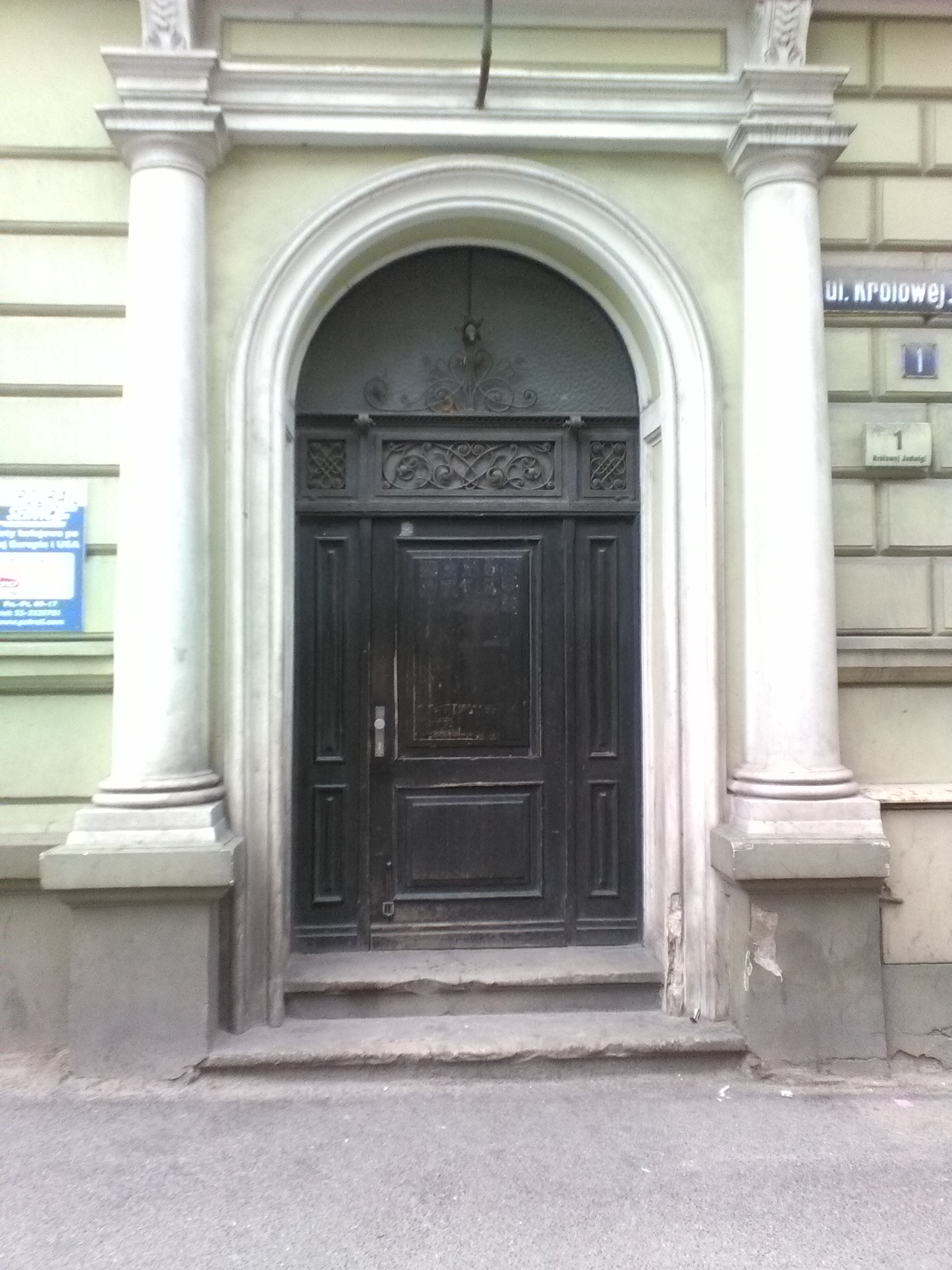
Door portal

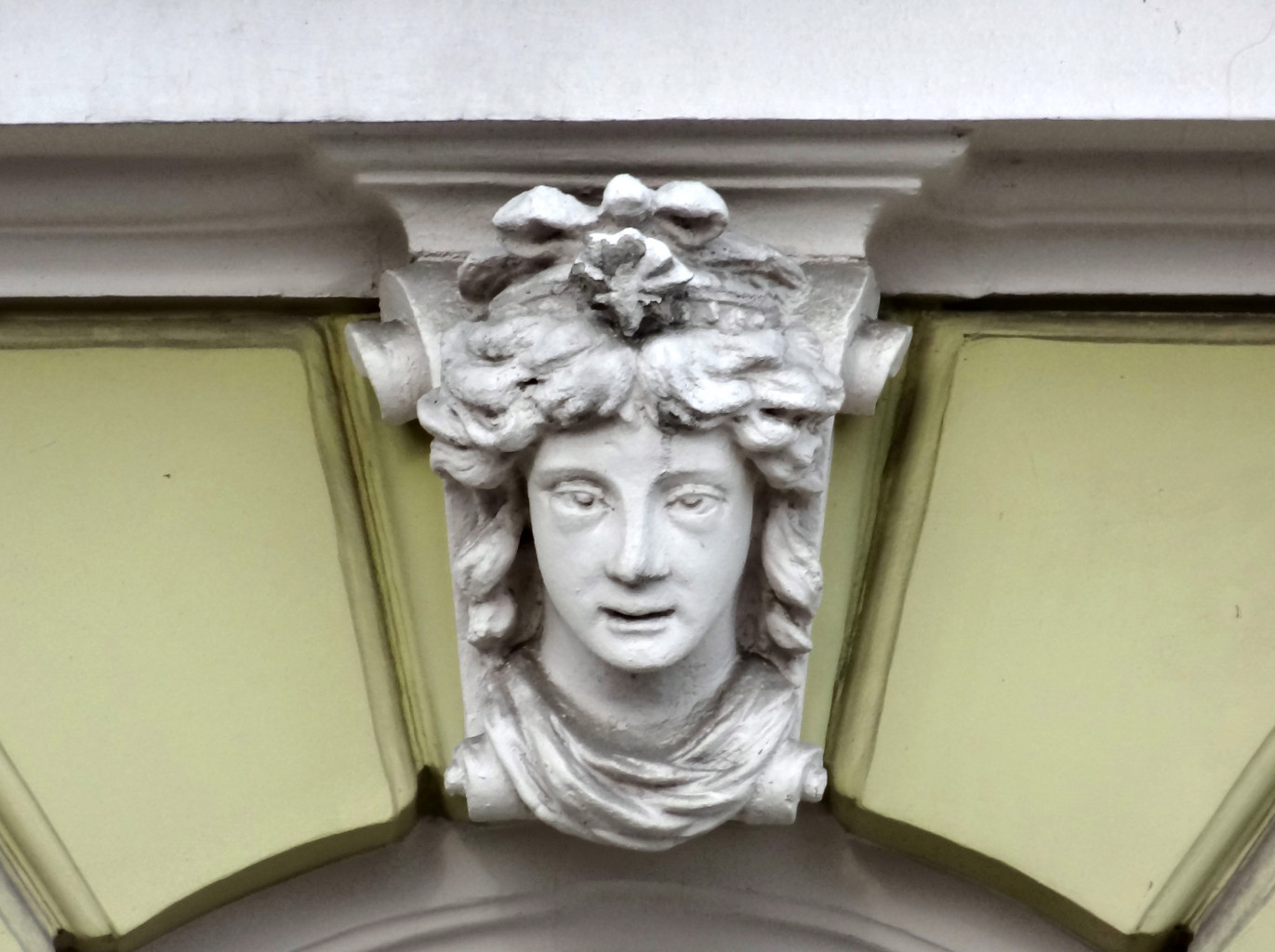
Detail of mascaron

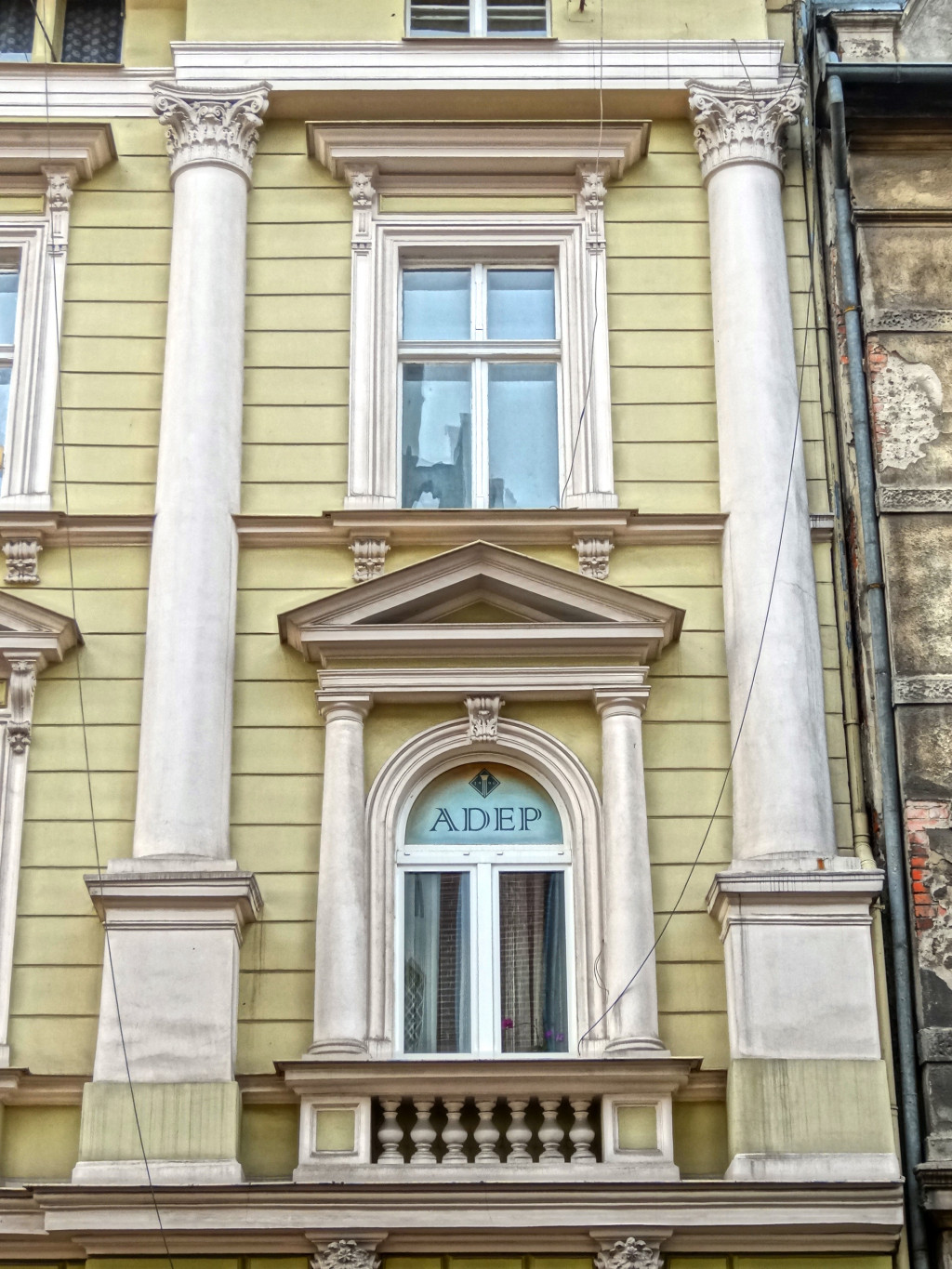
Avant-corps

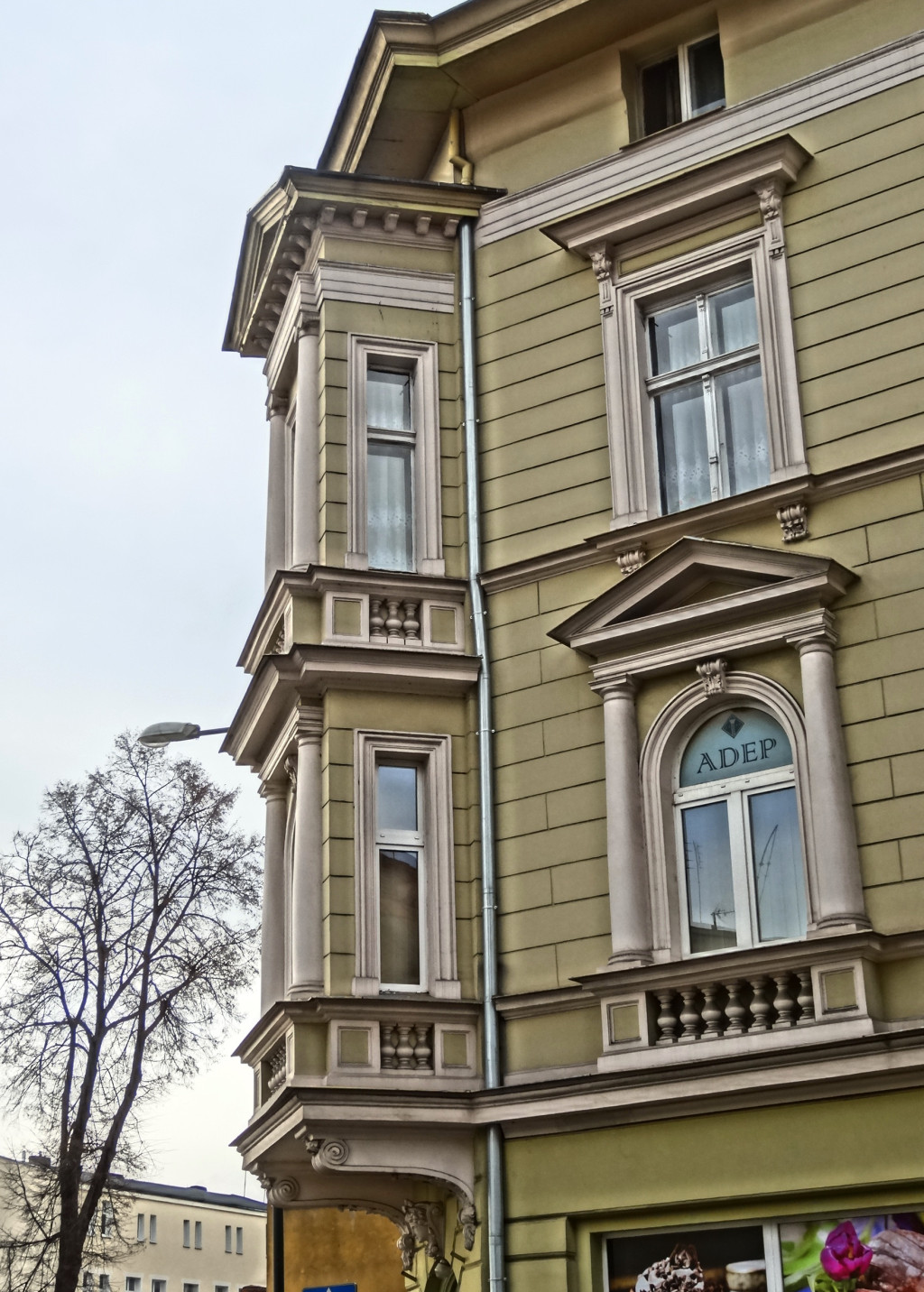
Corner bay window

Tenement at 2, corner with Garbary Street

Registered on Kuyavian-Pomeranian Voivodeship Heritage list, Nr.601372 Reg.A/824 (May 30, 1994)

1900–1901, by Paul Böhm

Historicism

Paul Böhm, architect and designer of several buildings in Bydgoszcz (Słowackiego Street,3, Cieszkowskiego Street, 1&3, Józef Weyssenhoff Square, 5), also realized this corner edifice. He did not live there, preferring his house at Danzigerstraße 61 (Gdańska Street 107, building is gone).

The house features picturesque settings, with medieval references. Material is a mix of brick and plaster, with a particular notice to the facade on Królowej Jadwigi Street, where several architectural pieces are to be underlined. The corner is highlighted by a tall bay window adorned with gothic-shaped windows, oeil-de-boeuf and stuccoed motifs, topped by an octagonal tower capped by a crenellated conical roof. The frontage onto Jadwigi Street possesses another grand bay window with the same gothic-medieval allusions (e.g. the crow-stepped gable). In addition, the highest part displays in a medallion a figure of Tadeusz Kościuszko (by Piotr Triebler)); above the medallion, a statue of Queen Jadwiga stands in a niche, towering the whole street that bears her name.

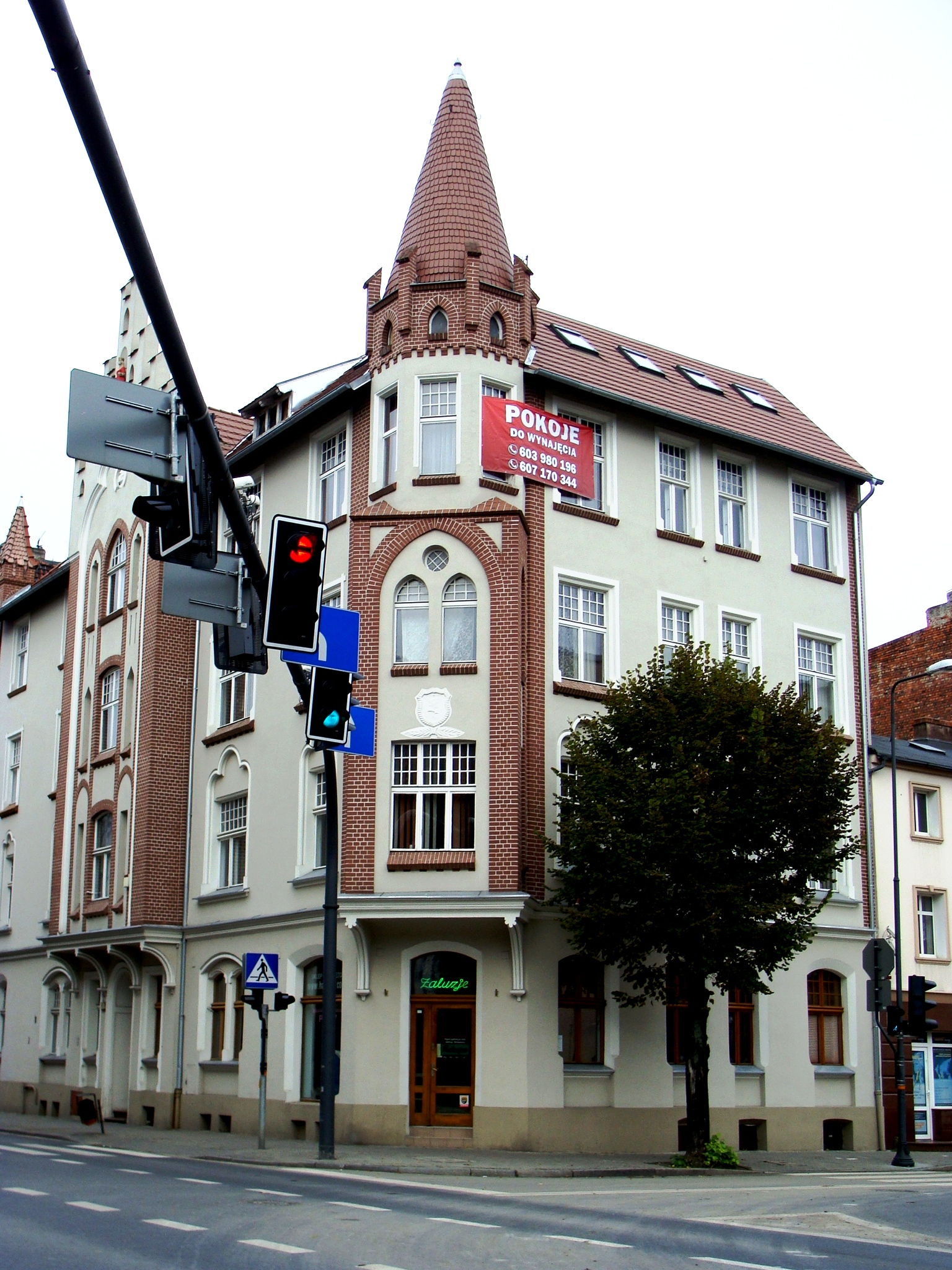
View from the street

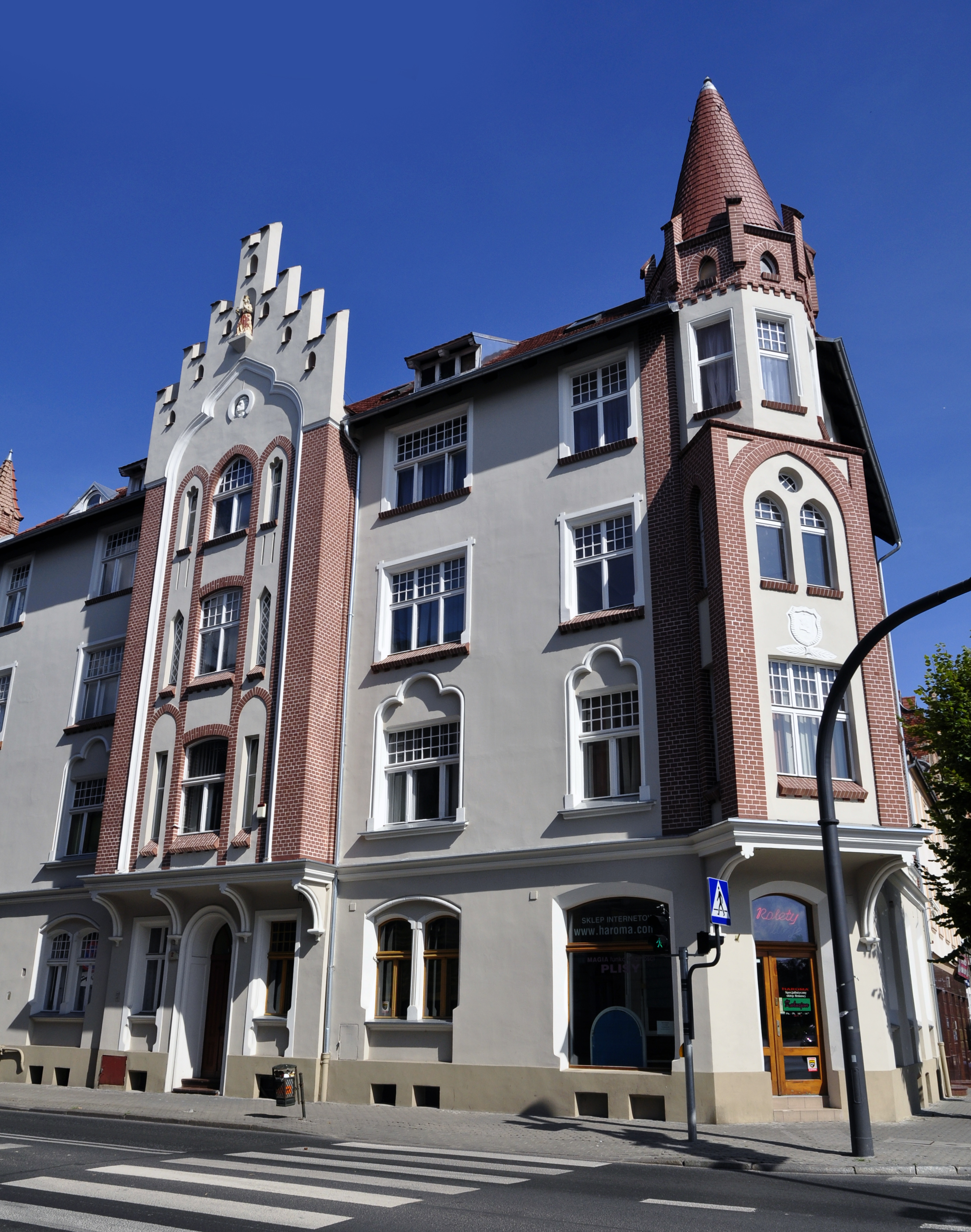
Elevation on Królowej Jadwigi Street

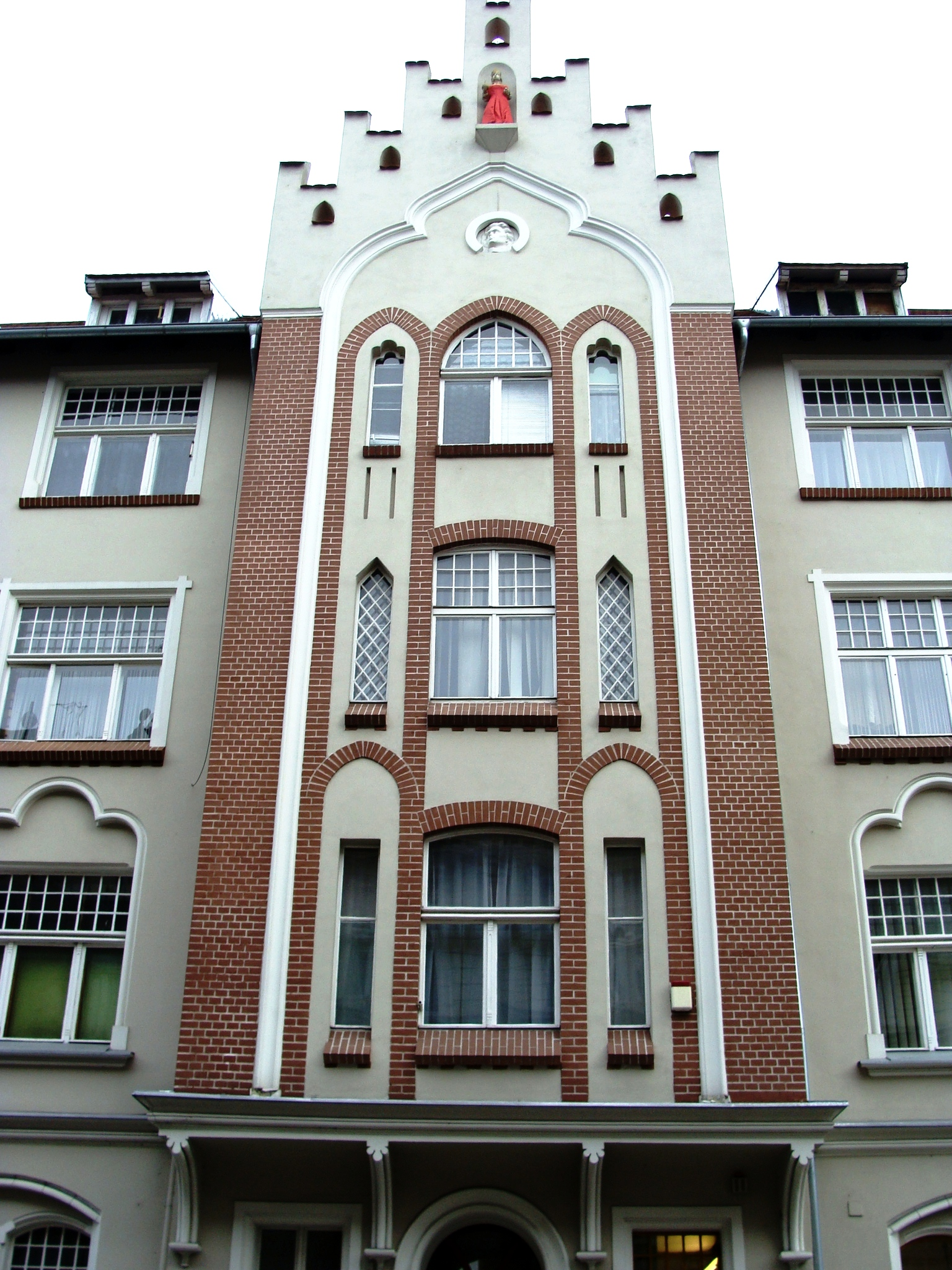
Bay window on the street

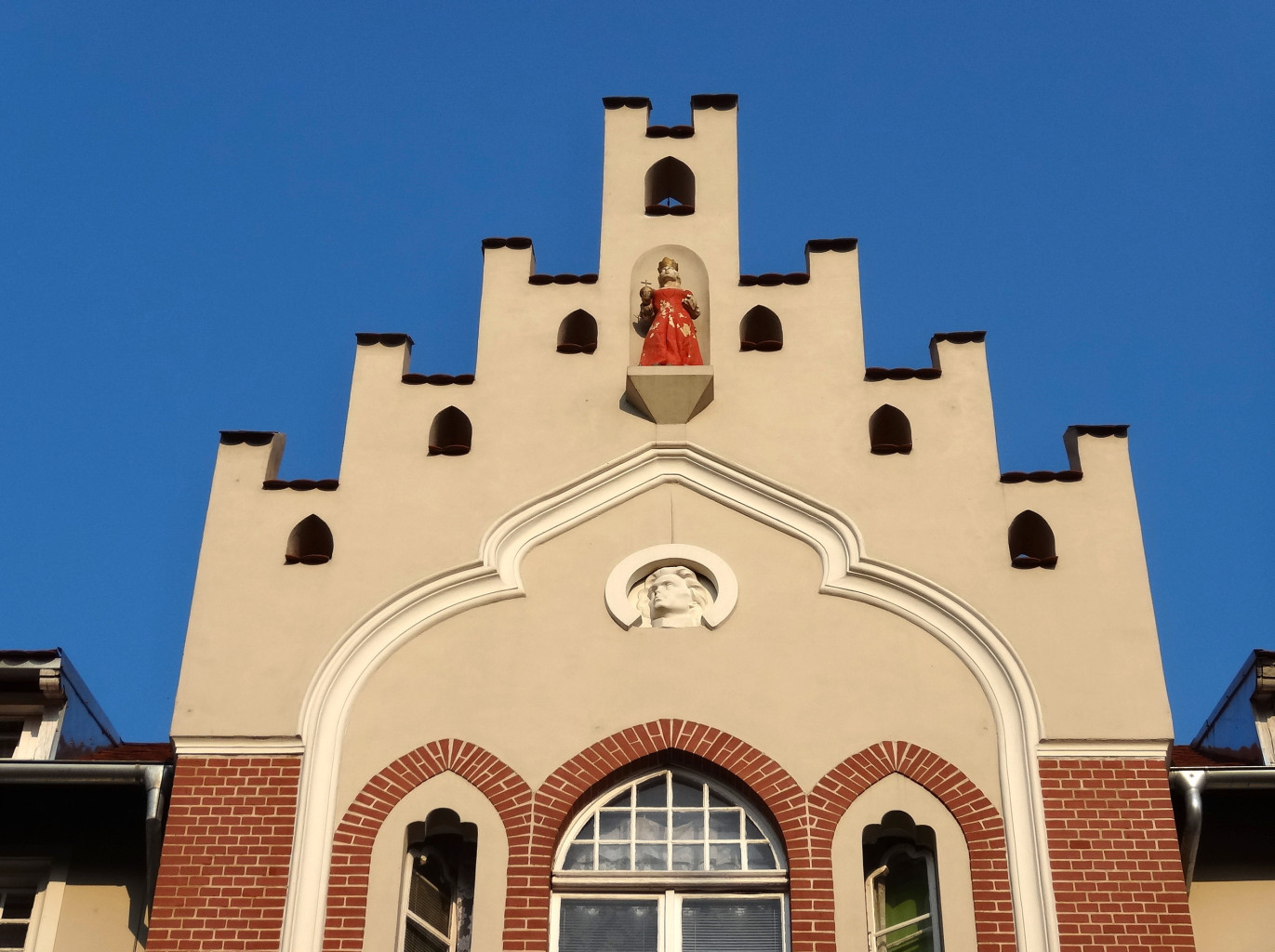
Details of the sculptures on the crow-stepped gable

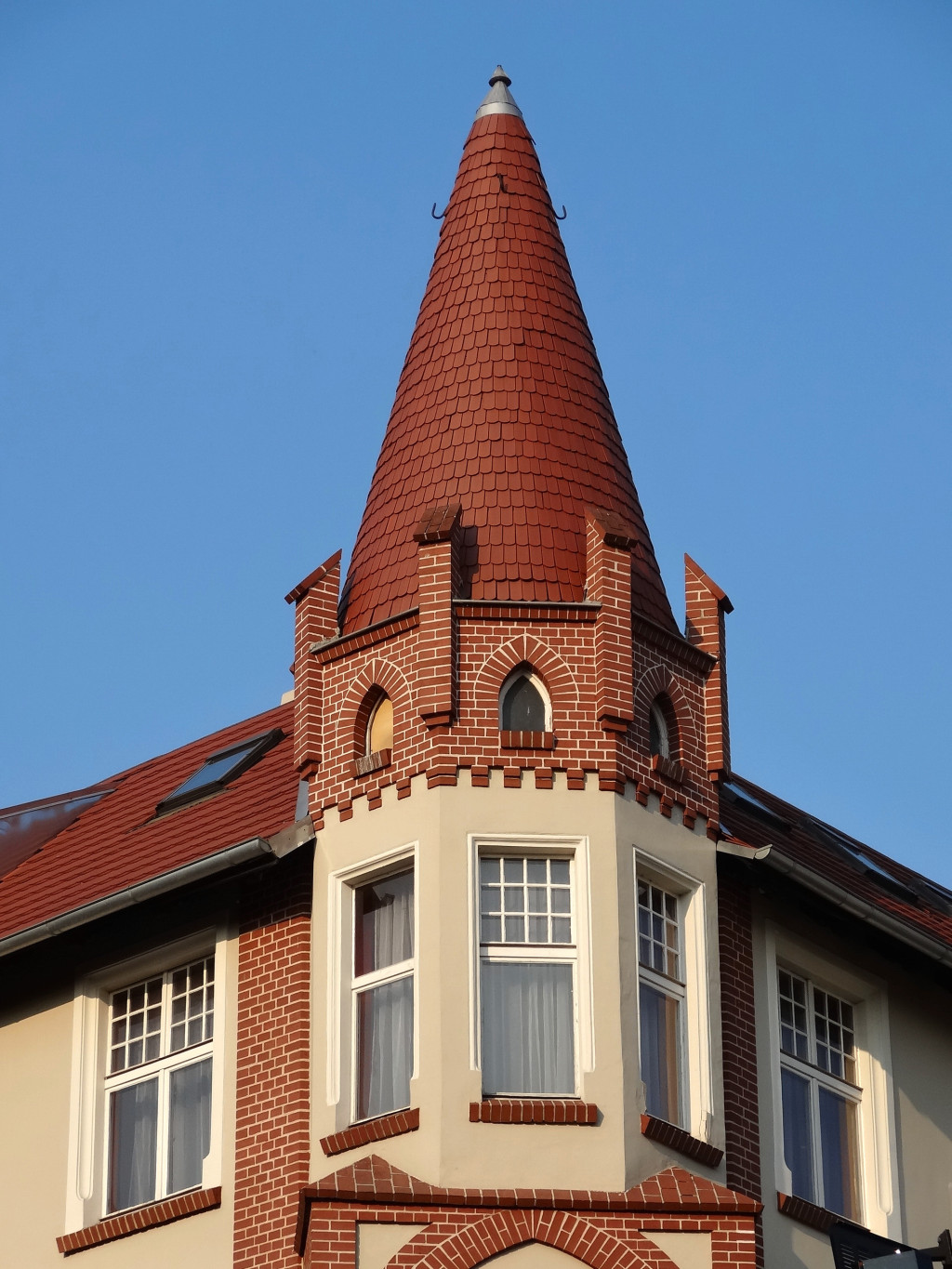
Detail of the medieval style corner tower

Tenement at 3

1897-1898

Historicism

First owner of the building was the architect Paul Böhm, designer of buildings at N 2 and 4. Looking at the facade, one can imagine that Paul Böhm somehow influenced the features of the tenement. When completed in 1898, the edifice was mentioned as uninhabited. However, cartouches on the loggia still display Böhm initials (P.B.), emphasizing architect's influence on the design of this tenement.

The house represents the historicism architecture trend, its facade displaying a mixture of elements (Neo-Renaissance, Neo-Baroque and Neo-classicism). Above the bossage of the ground floor, the grand bay window attracts attention: it features a loggia on the first floor and a turret with an onion dome and a finial on the top. A myriad of motifs adorned the frontage: pediments with medallions, head figures, columns. The left side of the facade boasts a neo-renaissance front gable. The building has been entirely renovated in 2019–2020.

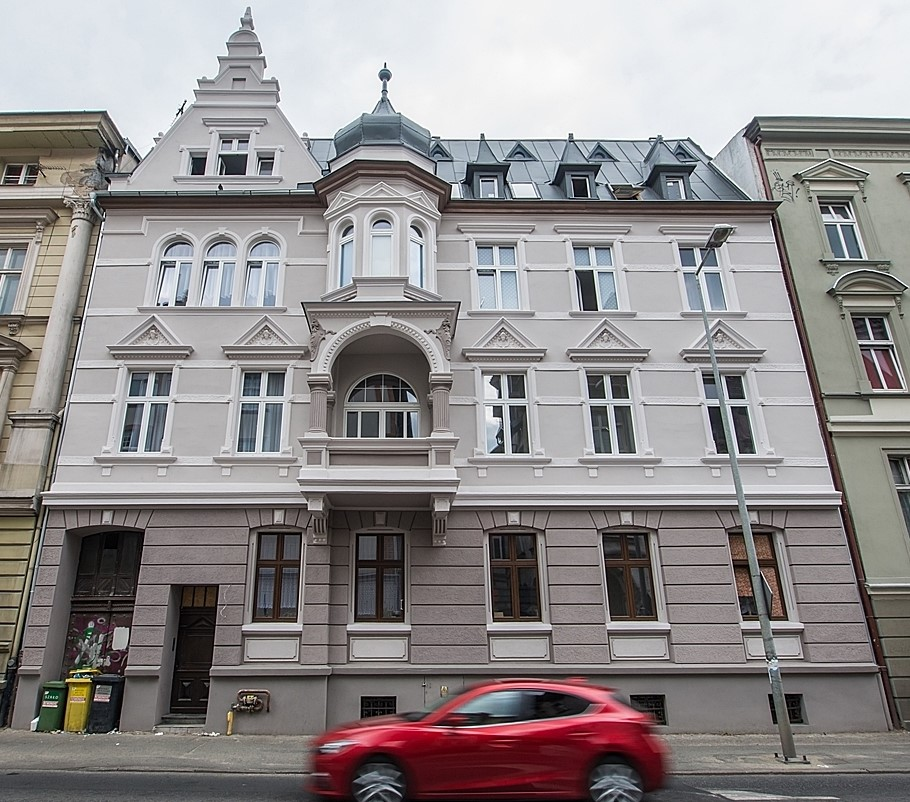
Main elevation from the street

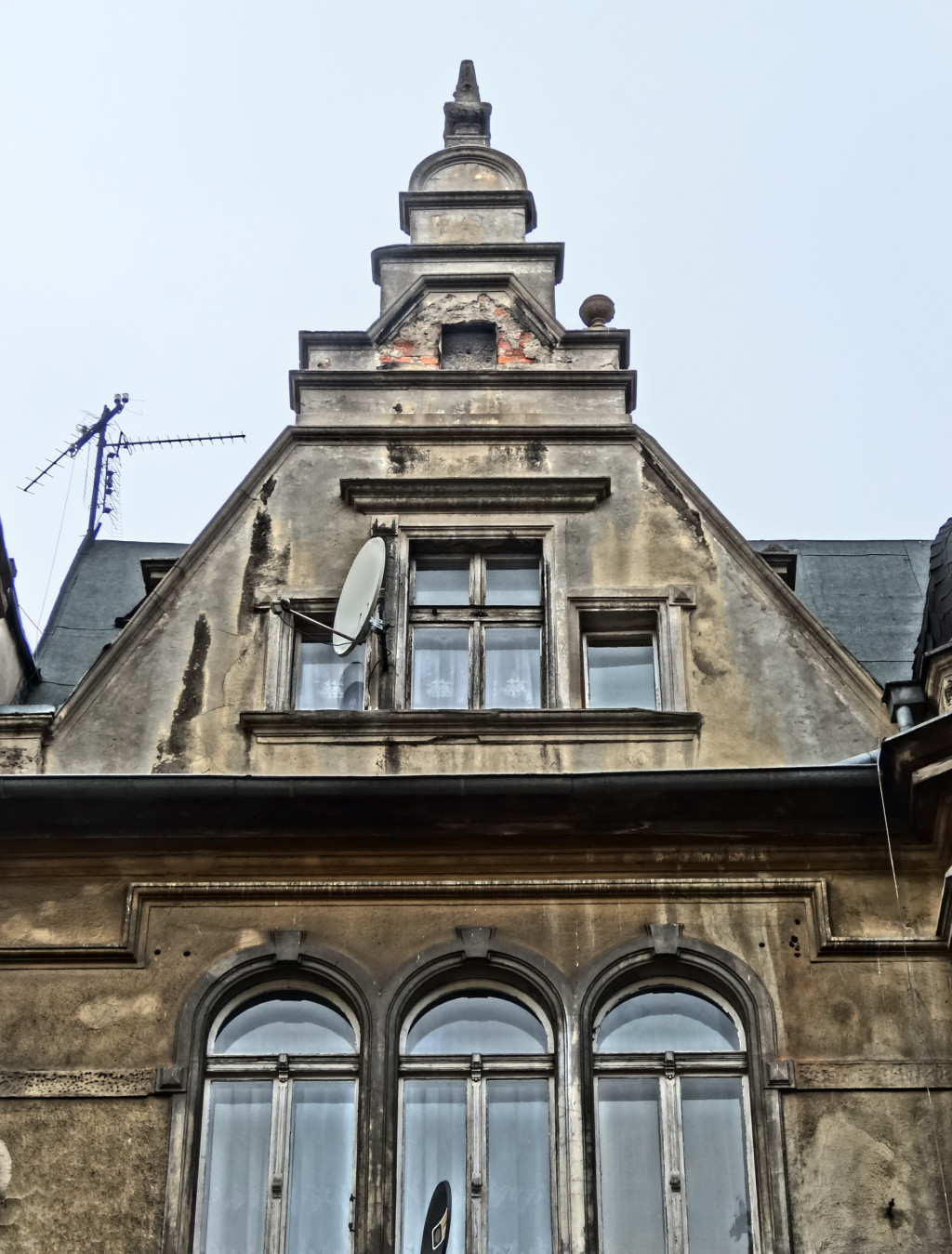
Left front gable

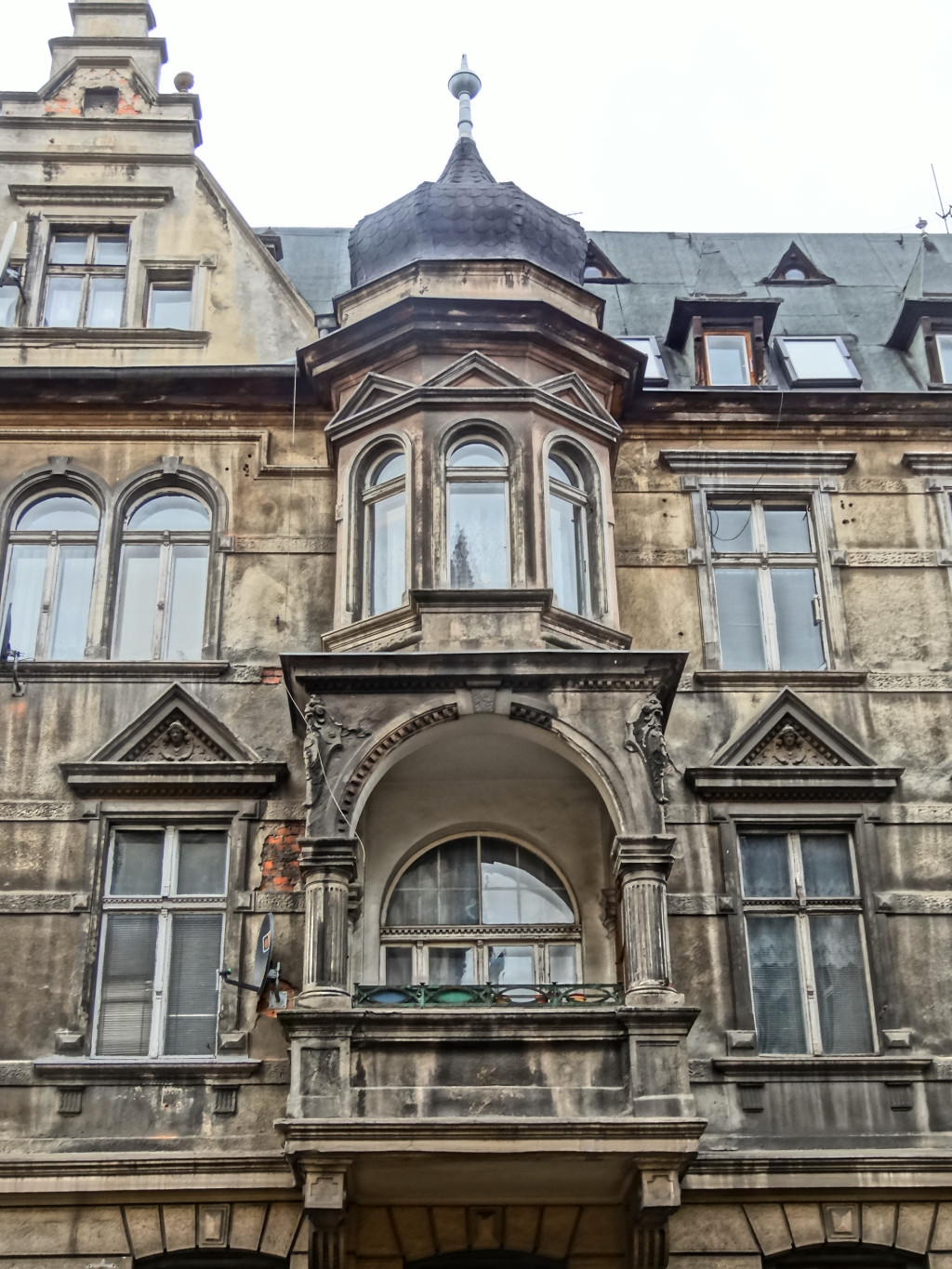
Bay window

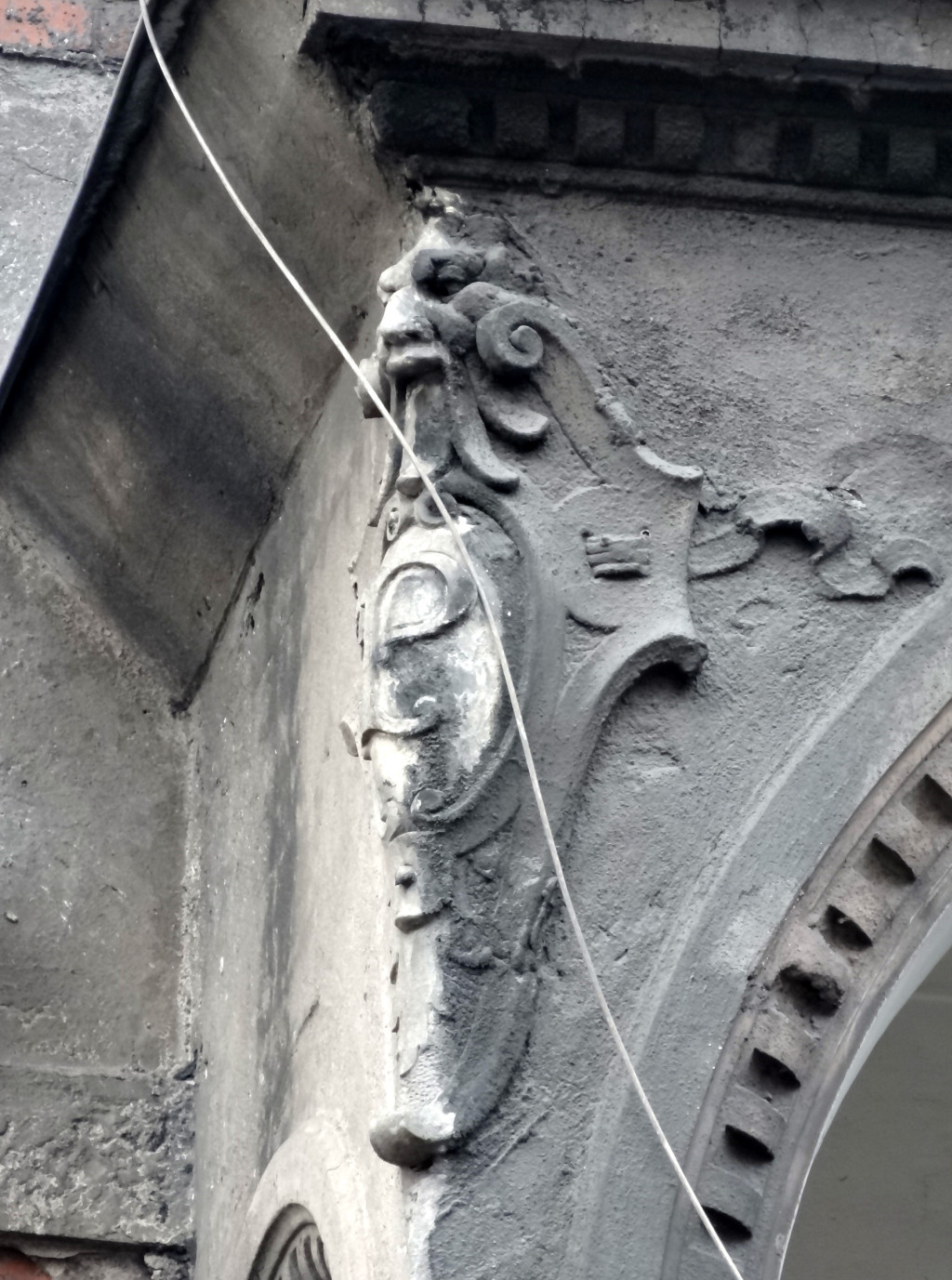
Adorned cartouche bearing P initial

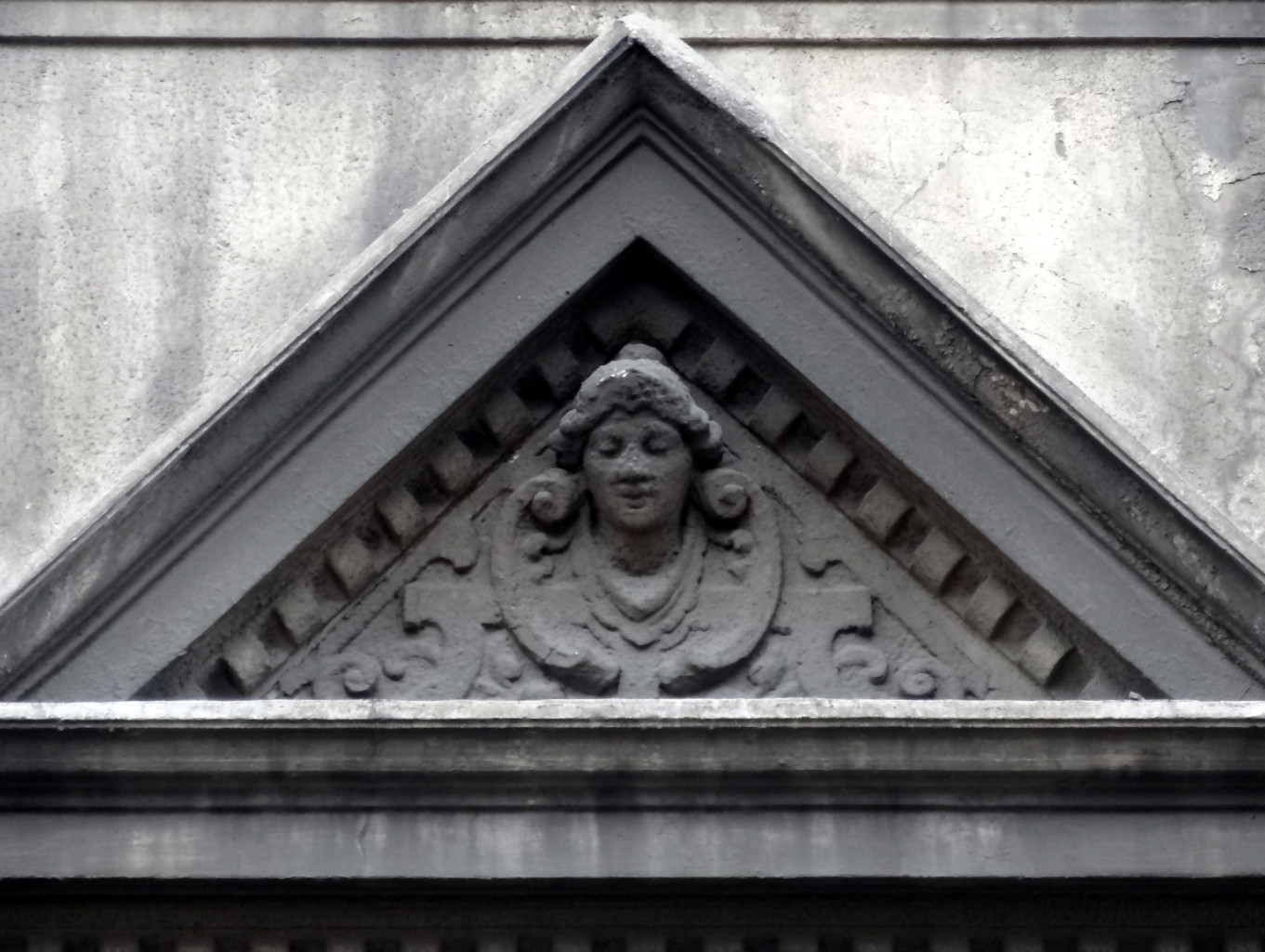
Detail of pediment

Tenement at 4

Registered on Kuyavian-Pomeranian Voivodeship Heritage list, Nr.601373 Reg.A/1096 (April 11, 1994)

1903–1905, by Paul Böhm

Historicism

The plot was referenced as Albertstraße 13 in the 1870s, but the current building has been erected at the start of the 20th century, when Paul Böhm, the architect, purchased the old house to have it reconstructed according to his design. Part of the municipality street works, the building has been entirely renovated in 2019–2020.

Architecture style pertains to rural English houses (cottages), which was fashionable in the early 1900s. This style can be noticed in other Bydgoszcz's buildings, such as Blumwe's kinderheim at Nakielska street 47 or Fritz Weidner tenement and Thomas Frankowski Tenement on Gdańska Street. For this house, one can underline the loggia on the ground floor, the wattle and daub bay window which top merges with the multiple front gables, as well as the wooden loggia on the second floor or the several dormers on the roof.

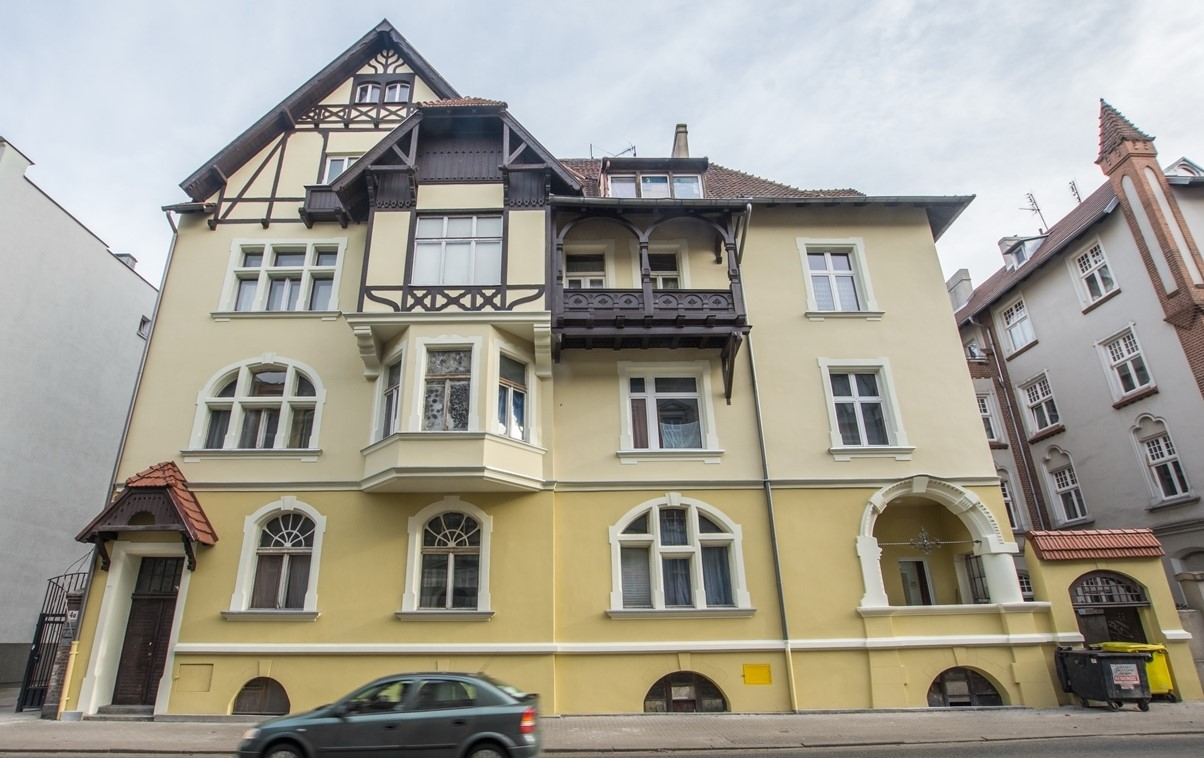
View from the street

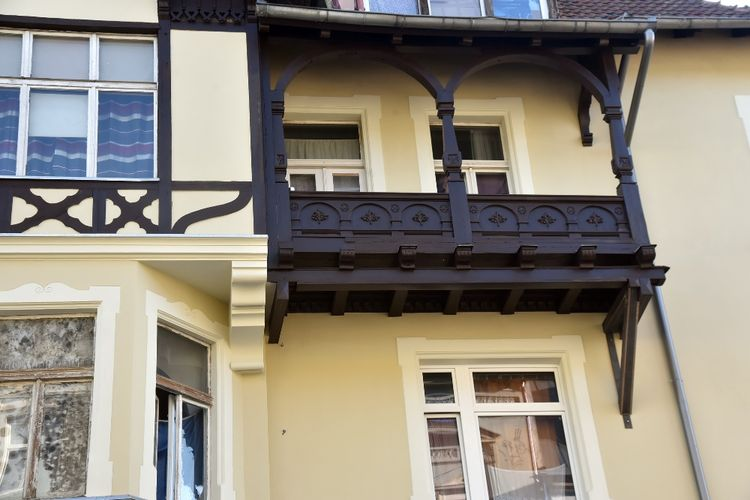
Wooden loggia

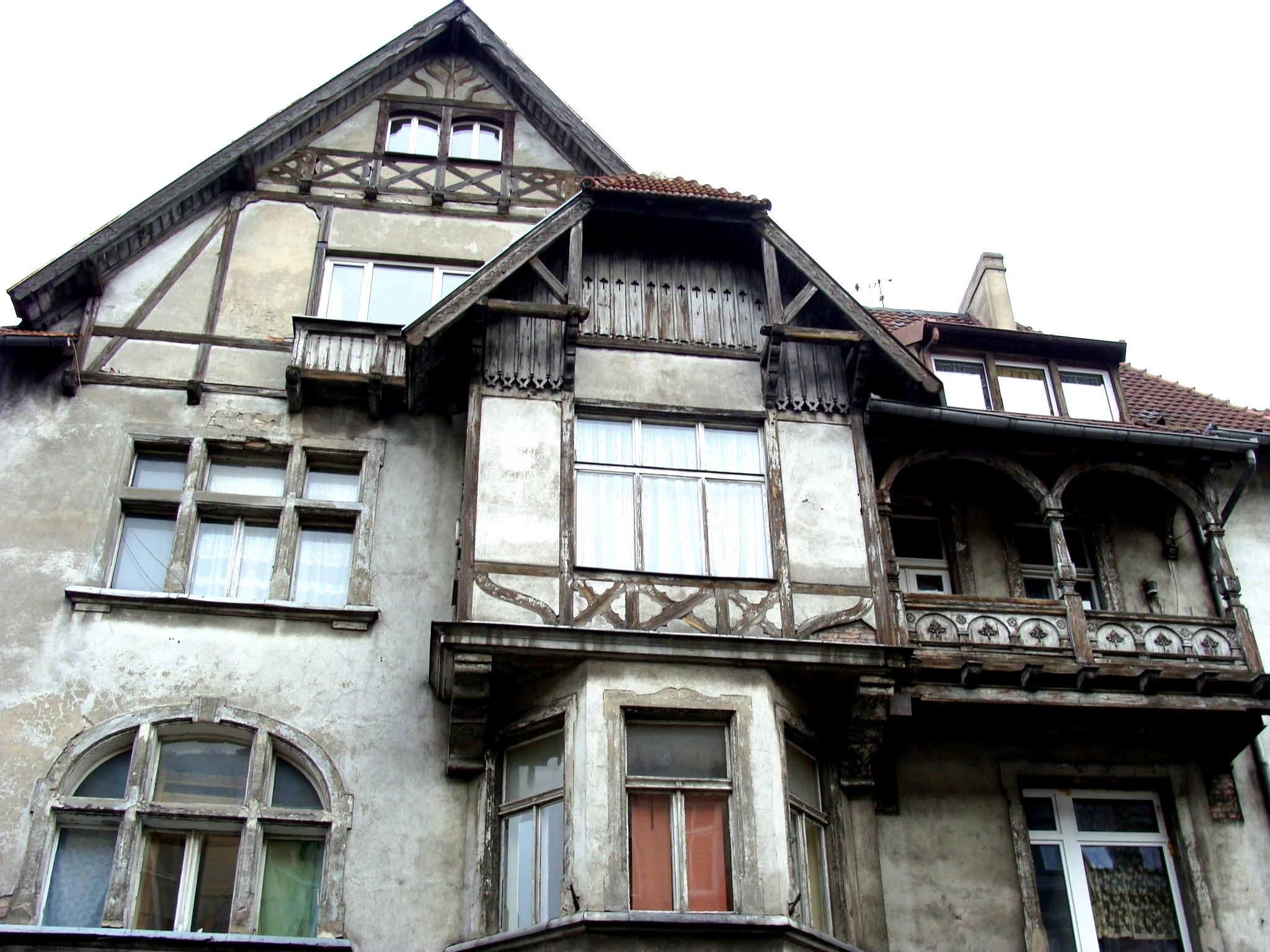
Gable, bay window and loggia

Tenement at 5

1890

Eclecticism

First landlord in 1891 was August Götting, a carpenter, living at Albertstraße 11 (now Garbary Street).

The facade presents typical eclectic features, with pedimented windows capped by corbel tables and dentils on the top. The entrance portal, flanked with pilasters, exhibits a medallion figure in the tympanum pediment. The tenement house is planned to be renovated in 2017

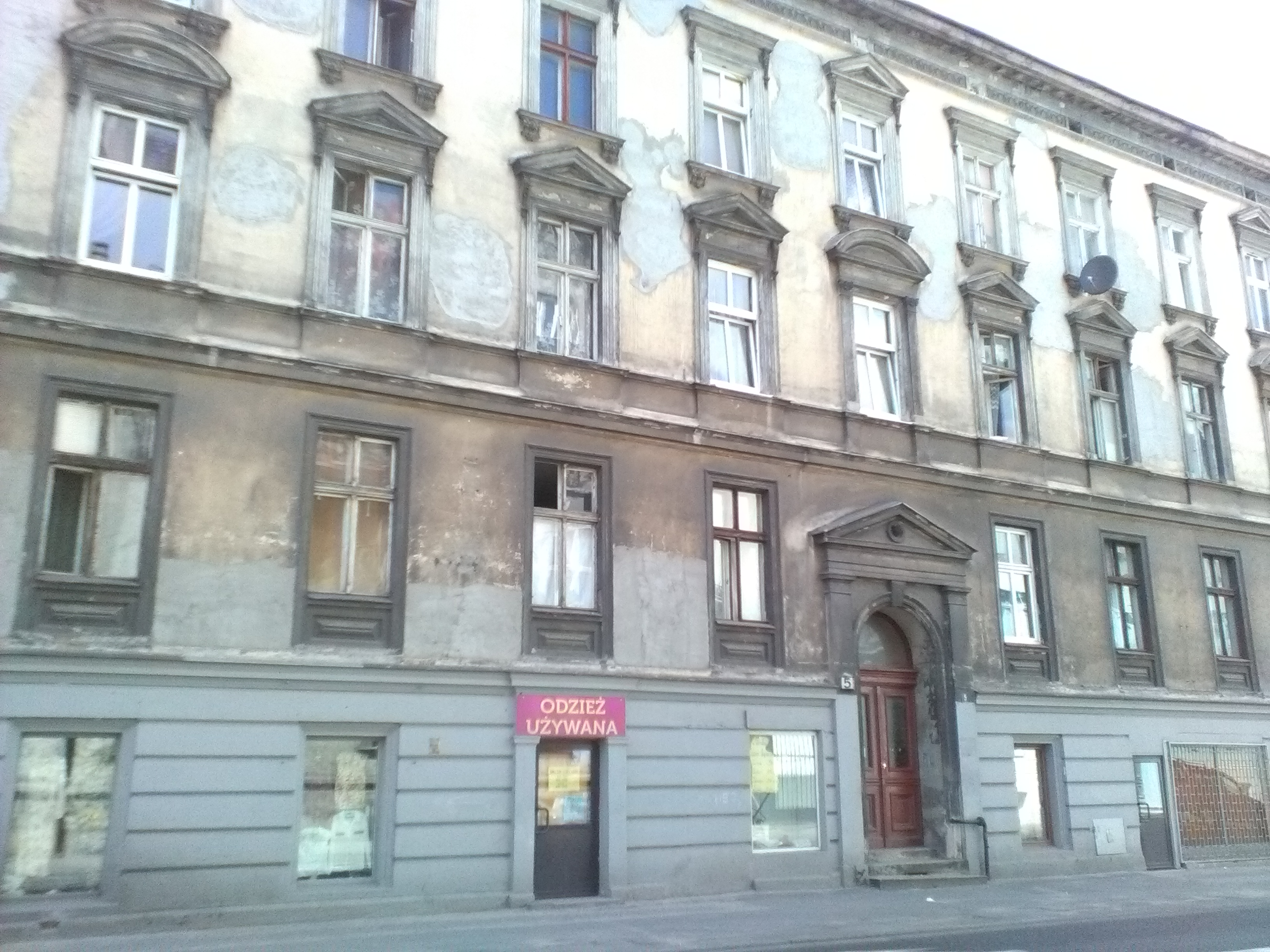
Main elevation

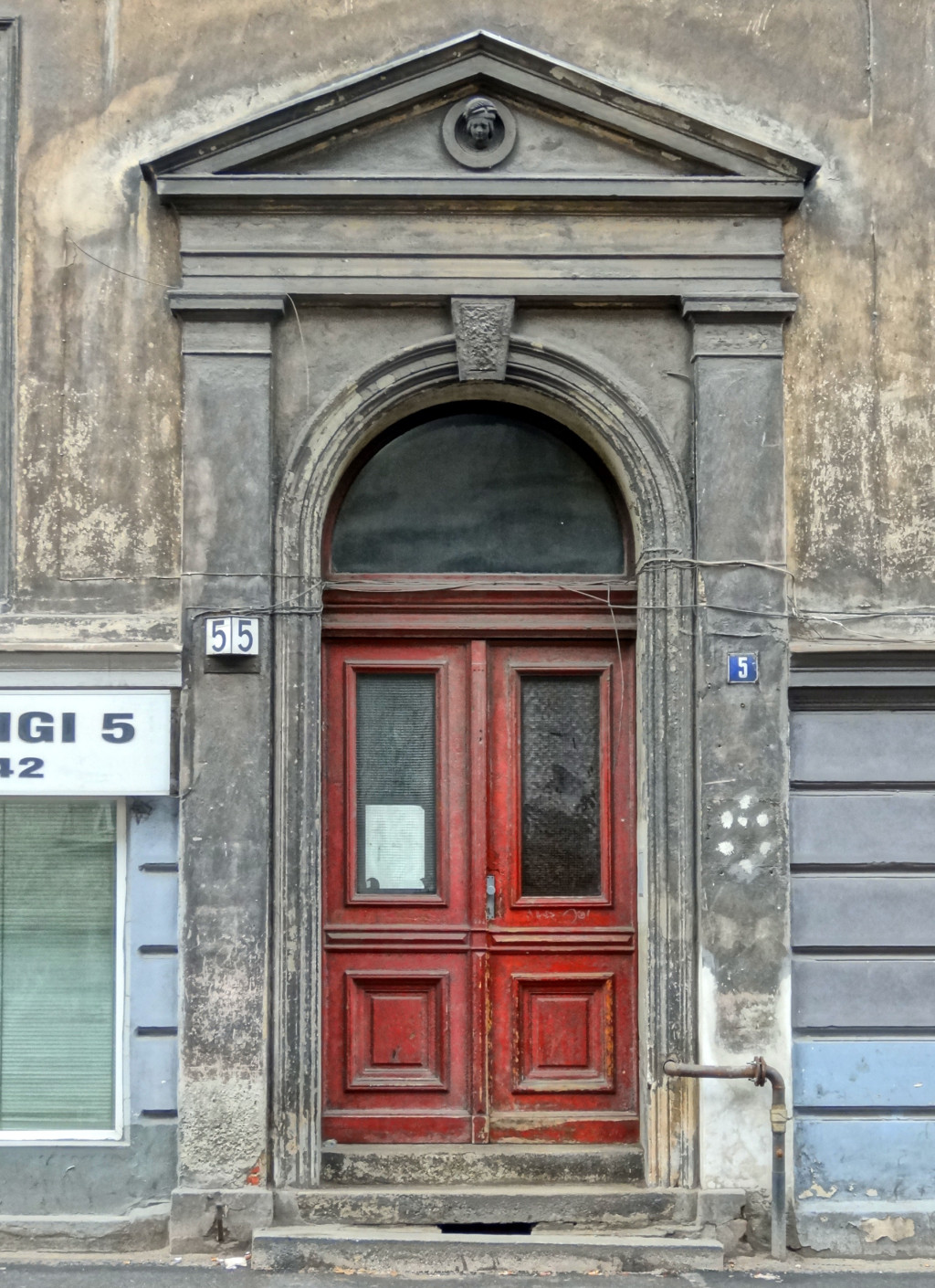
Entrance portal capped by a medallion

Mirus Tenement at 6

Registered on Kuyavian-Pomeranian Voivodeship Heritage list, Reg.A/1663 (July 17, 2014)

1876

Eclecticism

The building is one of the oldest in the street, dating back to the mid-1870s. It has been commissioned by Christian Mirus, who ran a transport company Haus Mirus. After the first World War (1933), another firm, Hortensje, had its seat there.

The tenement displays a beautiful and balanced eclectic facade, restored in 2016–2017. The ground floor is stressed by the large arched portal of the entrance. Higher levels are highlighted by the slight middle avant-corps that bears a balcony on the second floor, adorned with a series of motifs, pilasters, balustrade and topped by an arched pediment which tympanum displays putti holding a coat of arms. A thin frieze runs at the top of the frontage, echoing the line of rosettes on top of the ground floor.

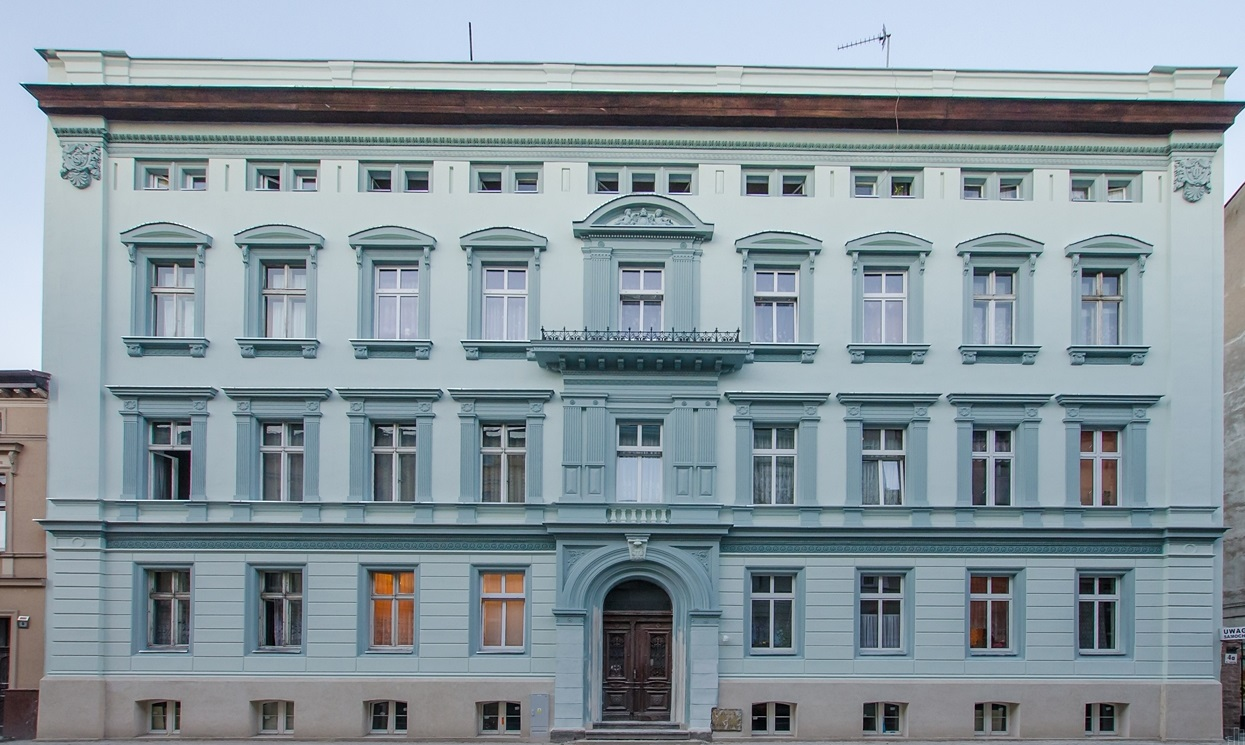
Main frontage

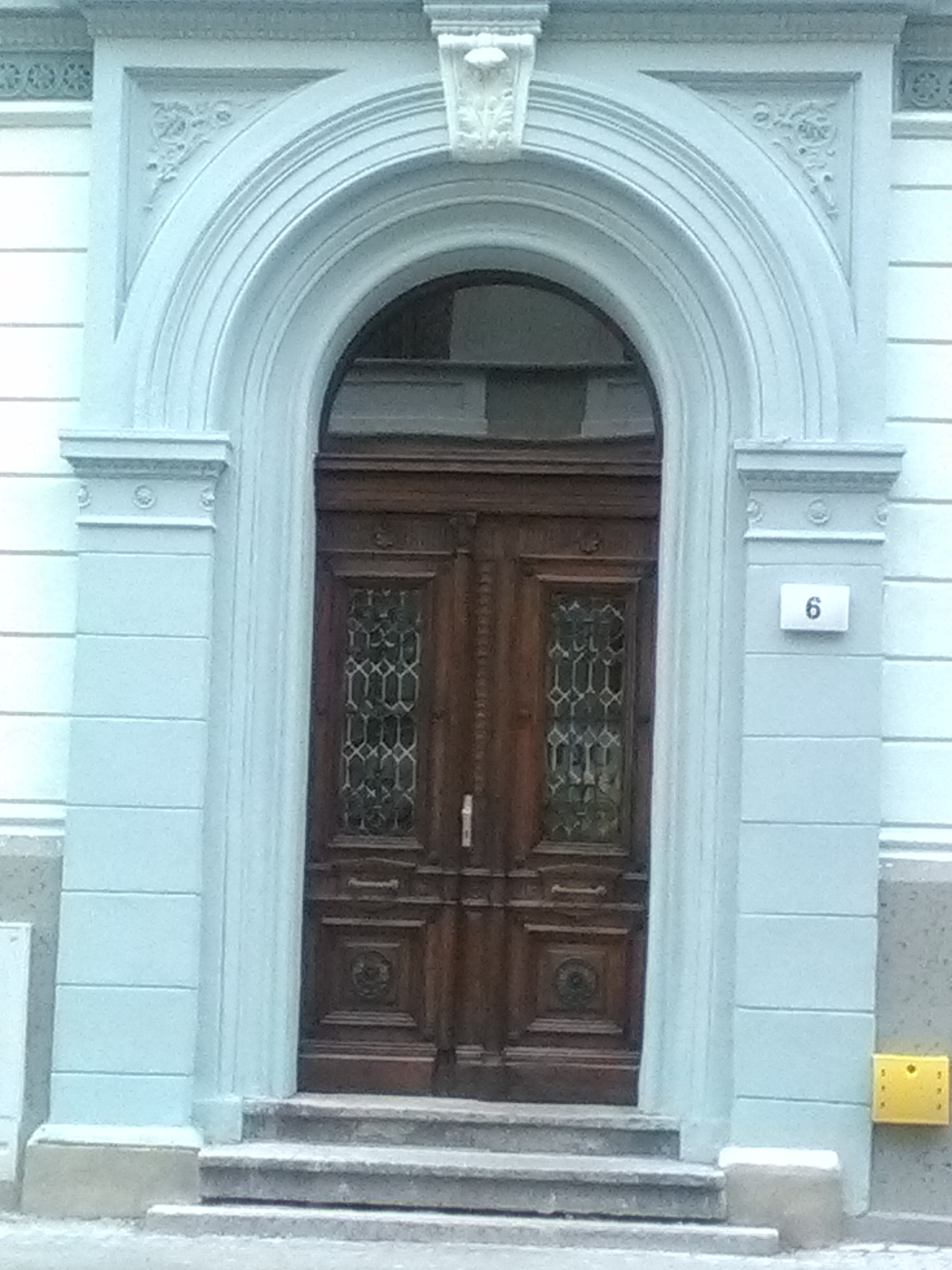
Door portal

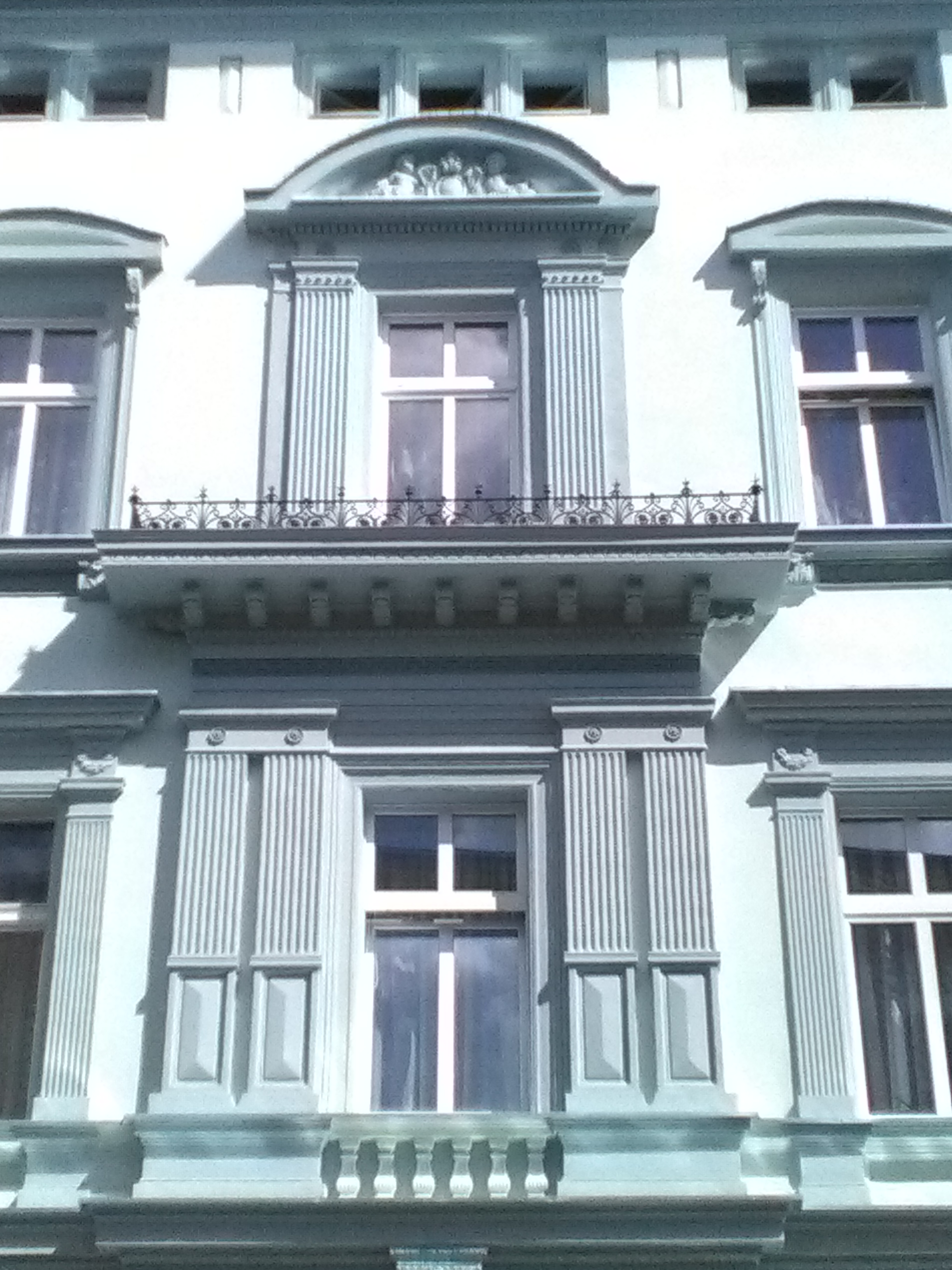
Facade detail

August Götting Tenement at 7

1887

Eclecticism

August Götting, a carpenter, living at Albertstraße 11 (now Garbary Street), ordered the construction of this house in the late 1880s, even though he owned the plot since 1885. He moved there, at the time Viktoriastraße 10, in 1900.

The facade, refurbished in 2016, features Neo-classicic elements.

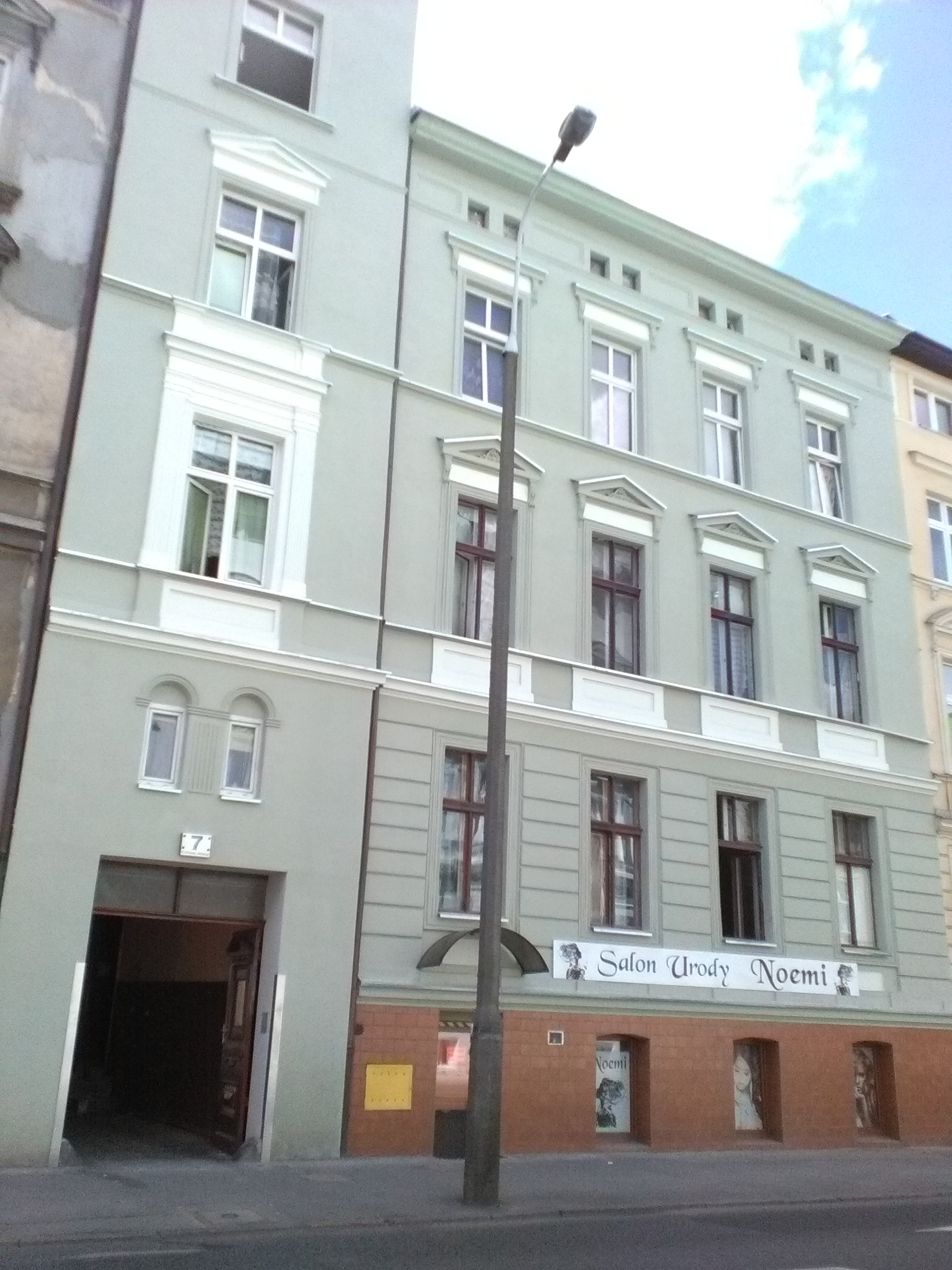
Main frontage on the street

Tenement at 8

1889

Eclecticism

Initially at Viktoriastraße 5, first known owner was K.R.B. Moritz, running Haus Moritz, a transport firm (German: holzspediteur), since 1878. In the late 1880s, he had the old house rebuilt to the current state. He lived there till the eve of the 20th century.

The renovation performed in 2016–2017, draws attention to the main elements of the facade: the bulging bay window on the left-hand side with its metal roof, the ornamented window crossheads and the neo-renaissance front gable, flanked by urns with a side railing.

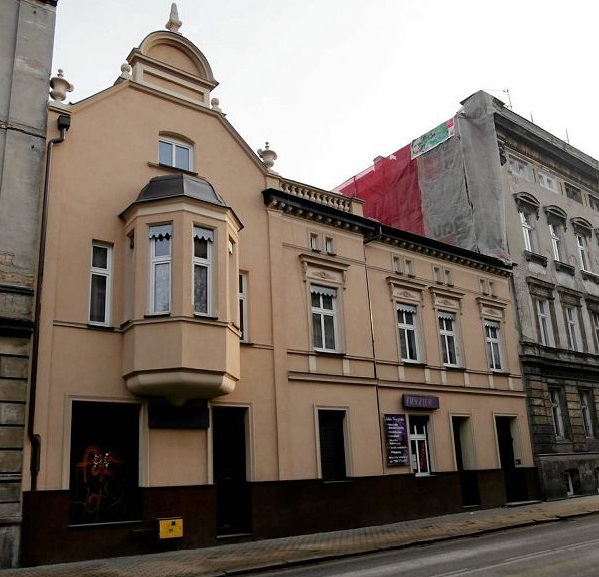
Main frontage

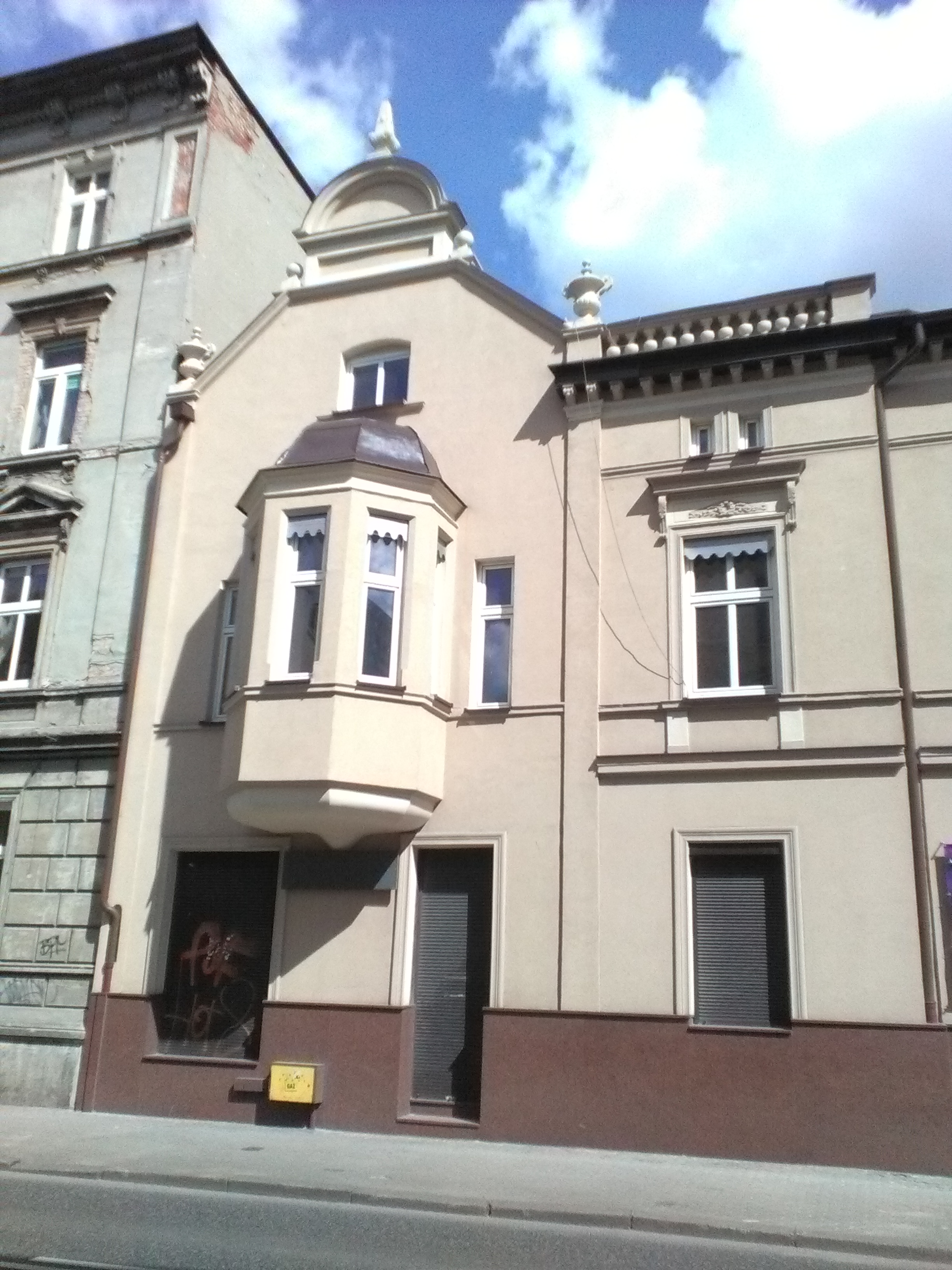
Gable, bay-window and balustrade

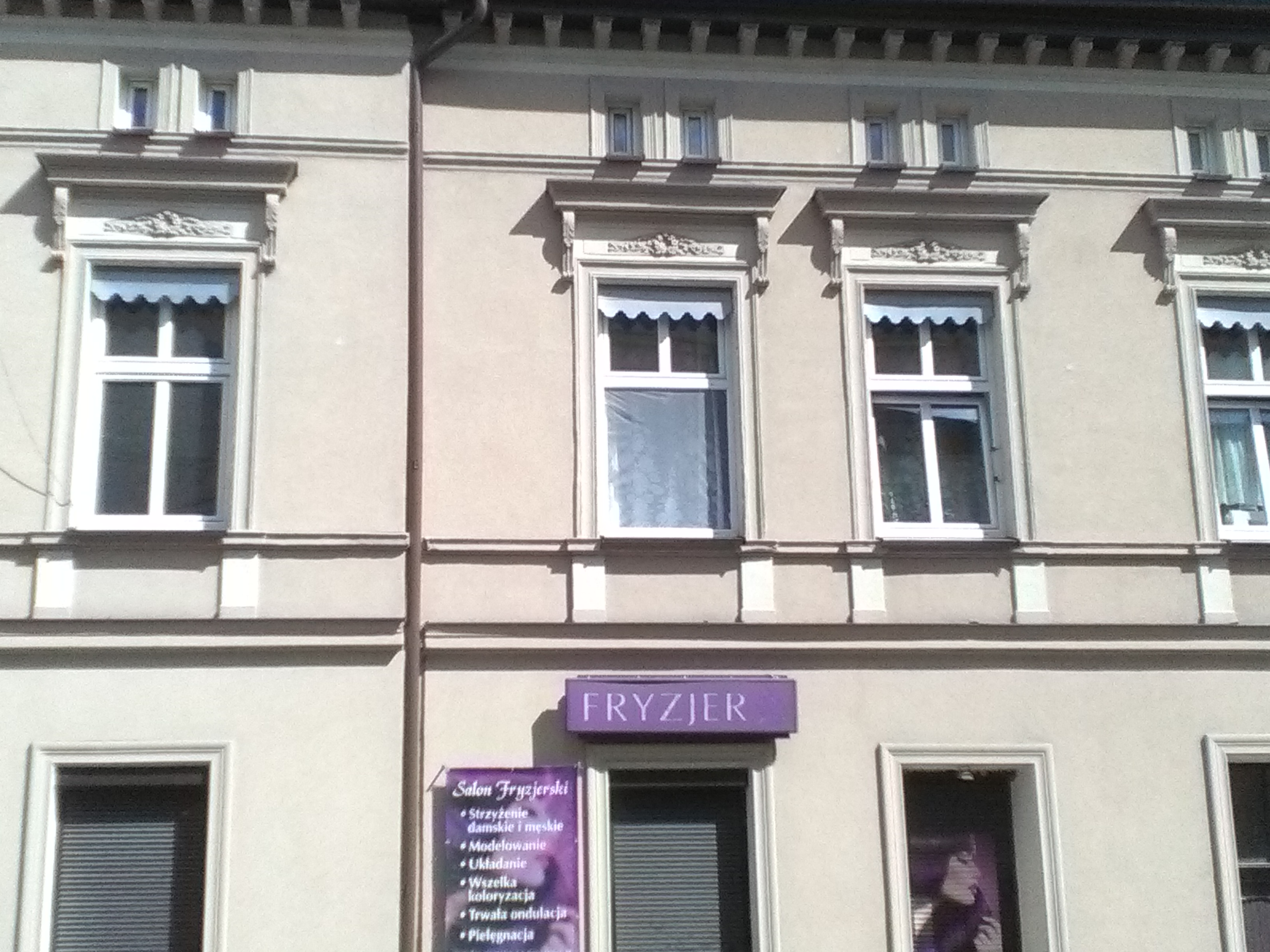
Window decorations

Leopold Hartmann Tenement at 9

1876

Eclecticism

This tenement is pretty old, by street standards, since its first landlord Leopold Hartmann, a painter, is registered on an 1872 document. He had the house re-built up to the current form in 1876. During the 1910s, it was the seat of the Industrial Bank (Polish: Bank Przemyslowy).

The frontage displays eclectic traits, with strong neo-classic accents. Noticeable elements are the oeil-de-boeuf above the entrance, the delicately adorned cartouches on window sills and the pediments crowning the openings of the first floor.

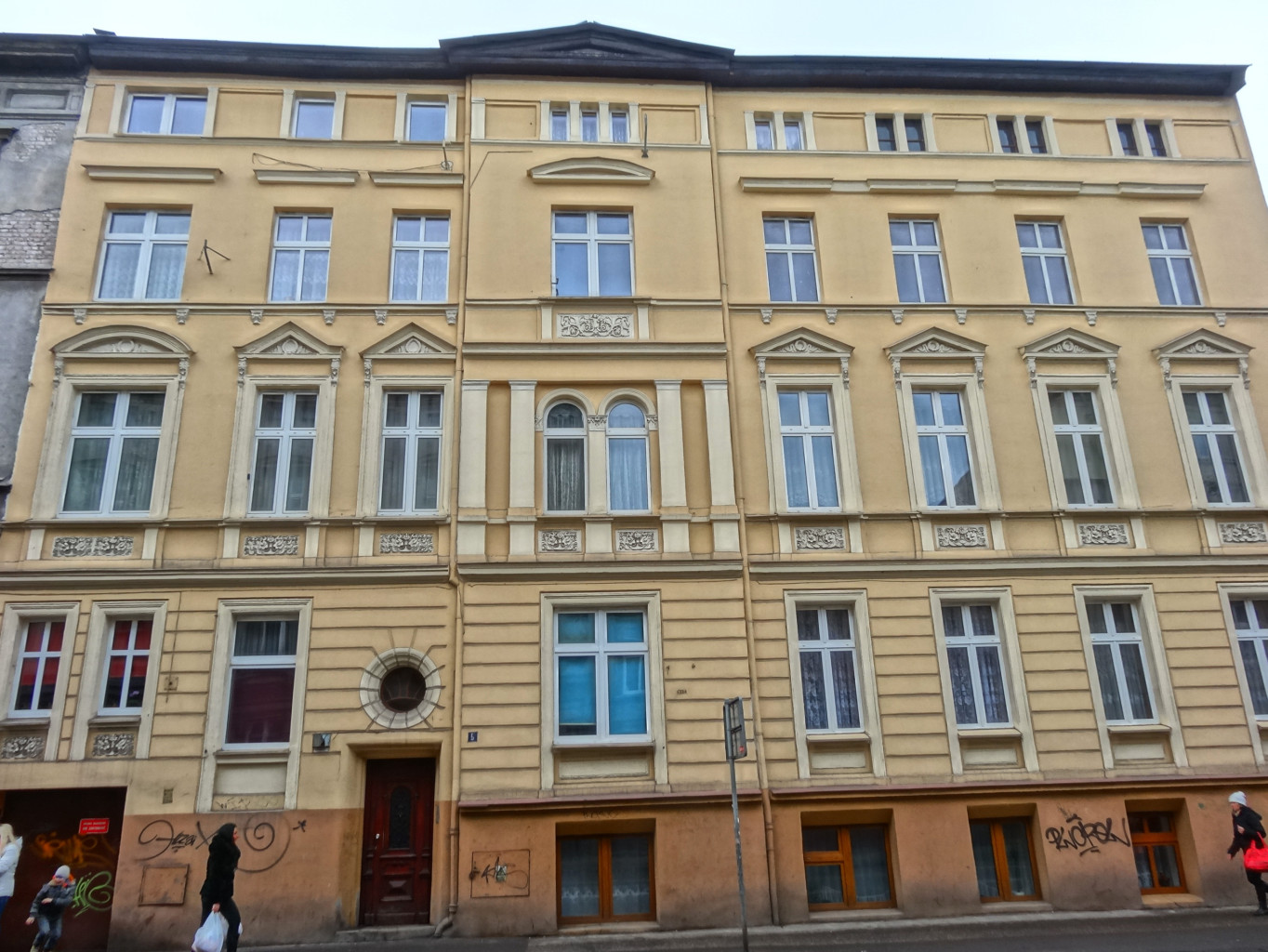
Main facade

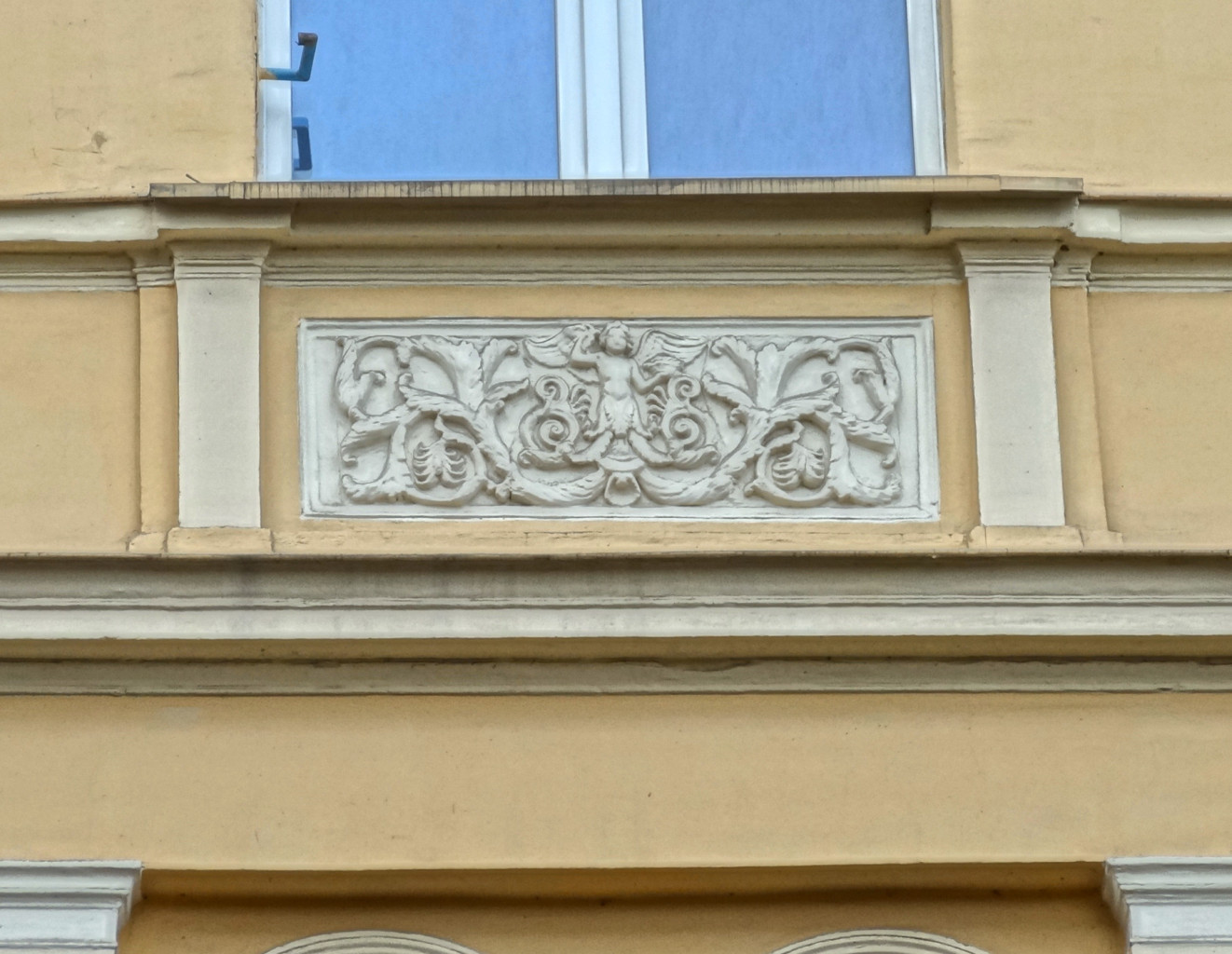
Adorned cartouche

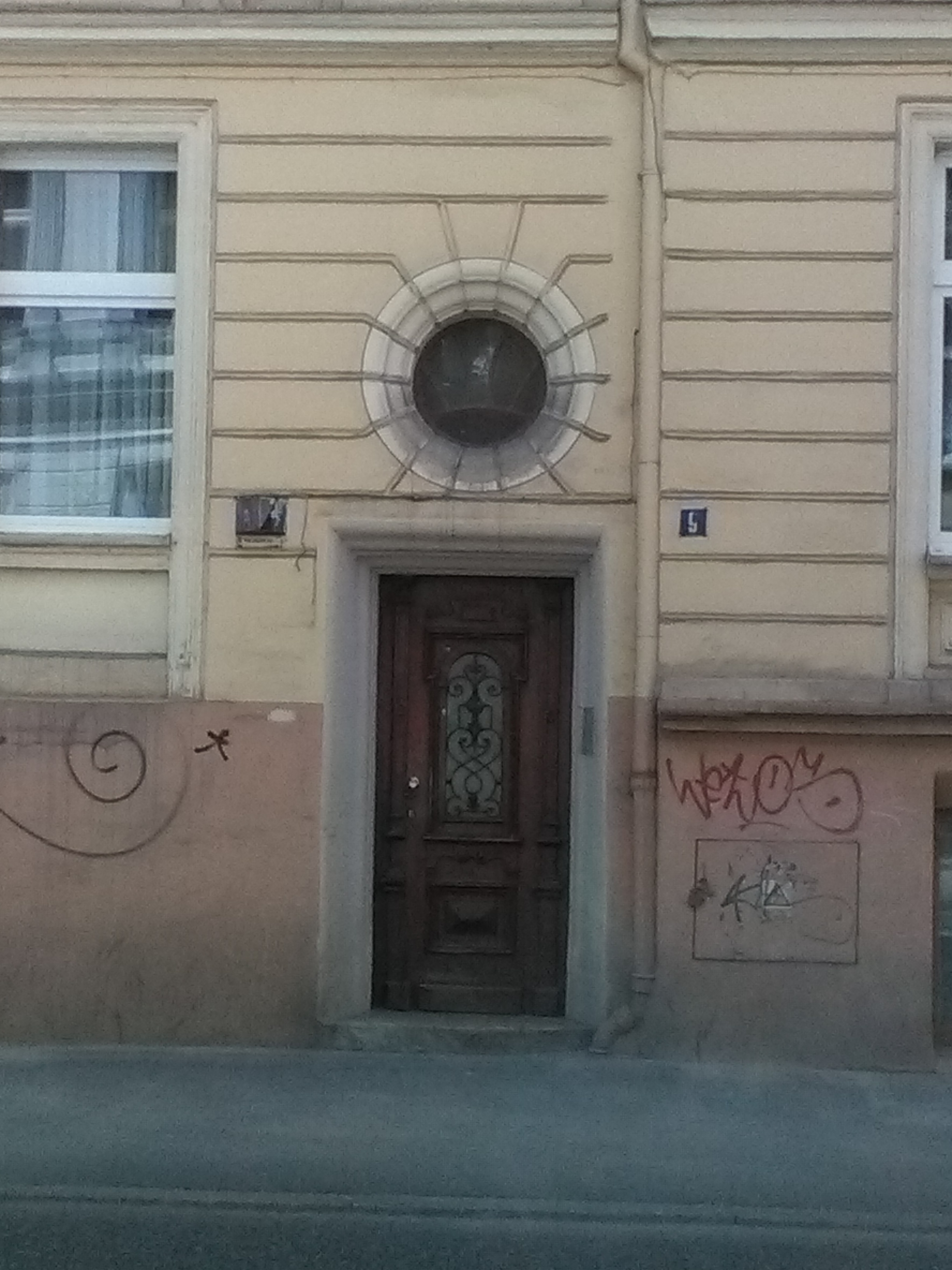
Oeil-de-boeuf and door

August Appelt Tenement at 10

Registered on Kuyavian-Pomeranian Voivodeship Heritage list, Reg.A/1649 (November 20, 2013)

1890-1892

Eclecticism

August Appelt, who ran a roofing company, had his dwelling and business place here, since the construction of the tenement in 1892. He lived there till the outbreak of WWII. This house is also the place where local author and poet Jerzy Sulima-Kamiński had been living (1928–2002). A plaque in memoriam has been unveiled in 2013, while his name has been given to the bridge crossing the Brda river in the old town, between Theatre square and Grodzka Street.

The neo-classic elevation draws attention to its portal: the two pilasters carry a crosshead bearing a bearded mascaron, topped by a pediment which tympanum is adorned with a winged figure and floral motifs.

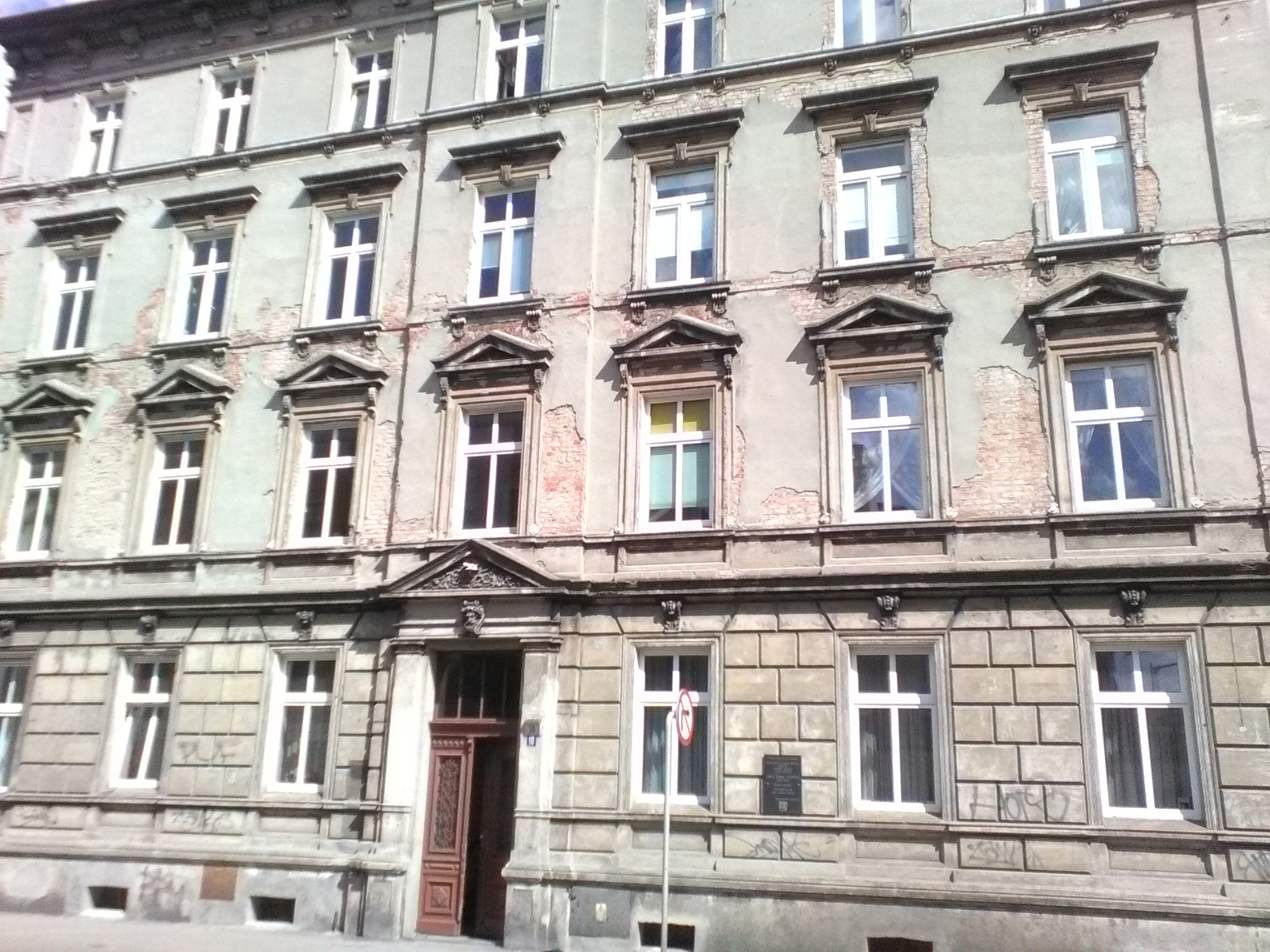
Main elevation, with the plaque on the right

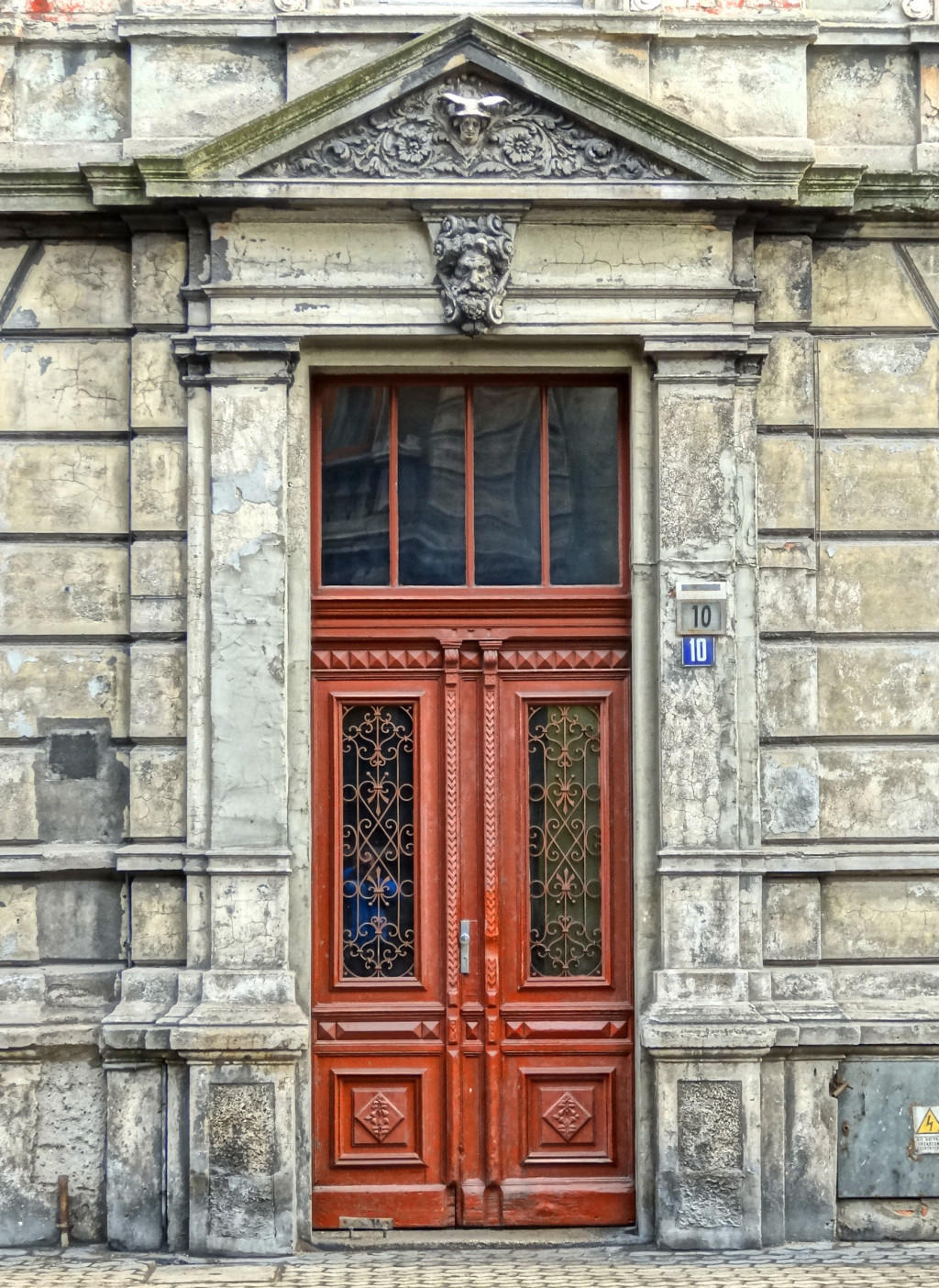
Entrance portal

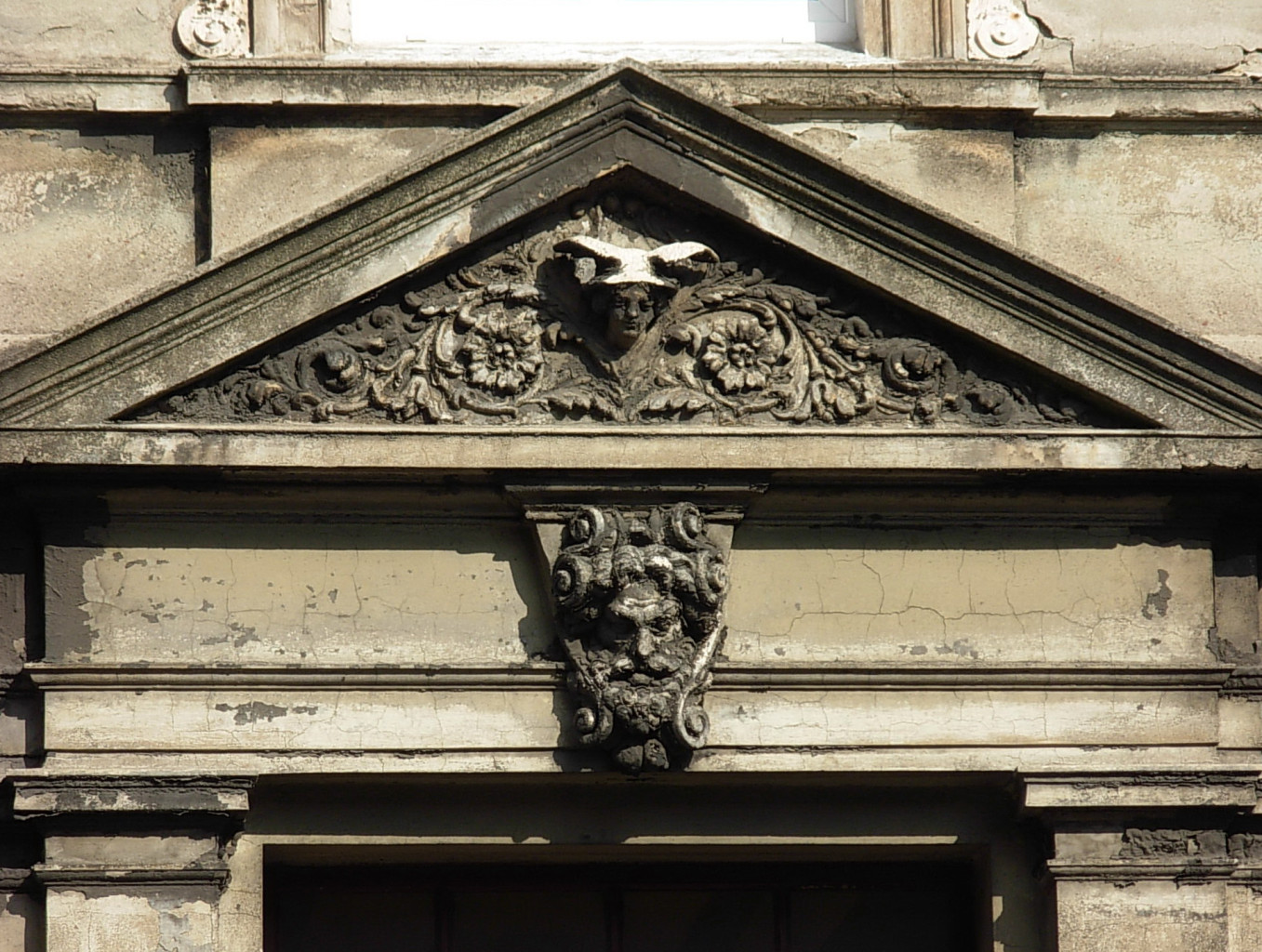
Detail of the crosshead and tympanum

Hermann Rosenberg Tenement at 12

1873

Eclecticism

This old tenement, from the early 1870s, had been commissioned by Hermann Rosenberg, running a transport firm at Holzhofstraße 14 (now Naruszewicza street). He lived there till the eve of the first World War.

The neo-classic frontage, though worn out by time, still displays some architectural details: cartouches with festoons on the first floor and ornaments on the top, or adorned window crossheads.

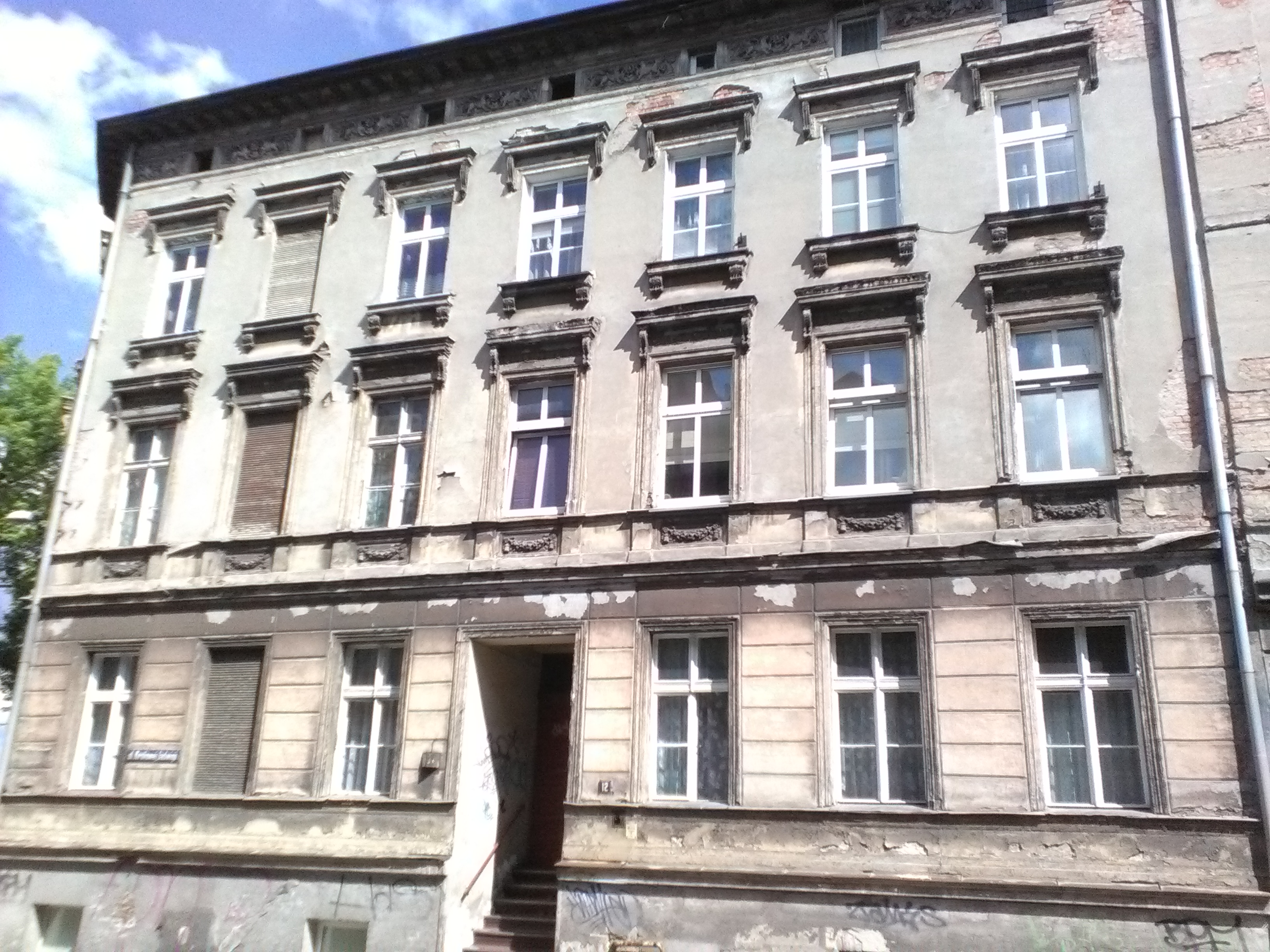
Main facade

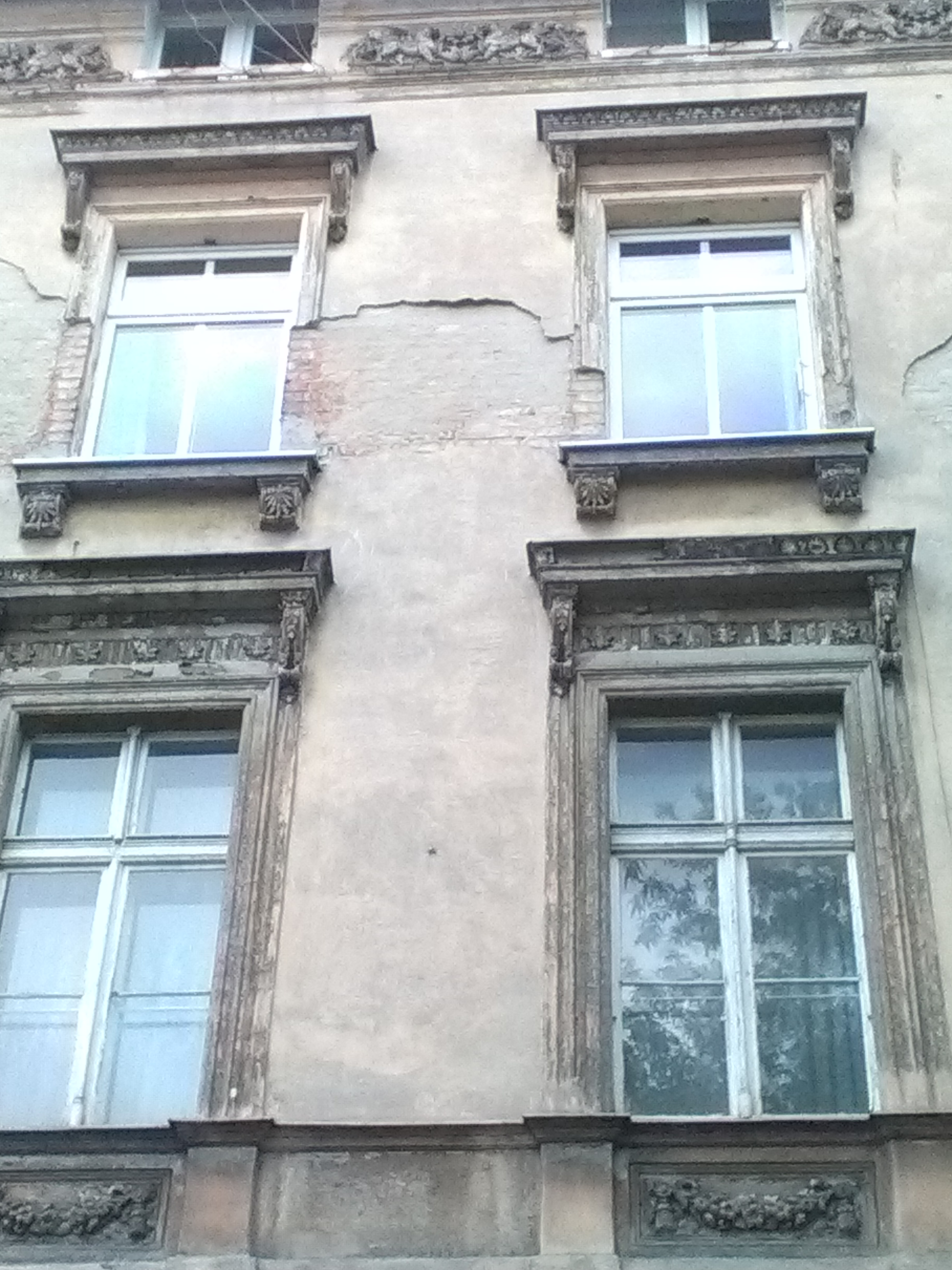
Facade detail

Tenement at 13

1895-1896

Eclecticism

August Götting, landlord at Nr.5 and 7, had also owned this tenement since 1897. In 1925, Bydgoszcz sculptors Piotr Triebler and Teodor Gajewski opened here their first studio.

The eclectic frontage is particularly rich with architectural details. Each slight avant-corps on building sides is crowned by a triangular pediment with an adorned tympanum (bearing a coat of arms). Each opening is ornamented (pediment, mascaron, balustrade, vegetal motifs). The portal displays pilasters, bossage and a triangular tympanum. By its style and material, the house echoes the tenement at Pomorska Street 26, built at the same period.

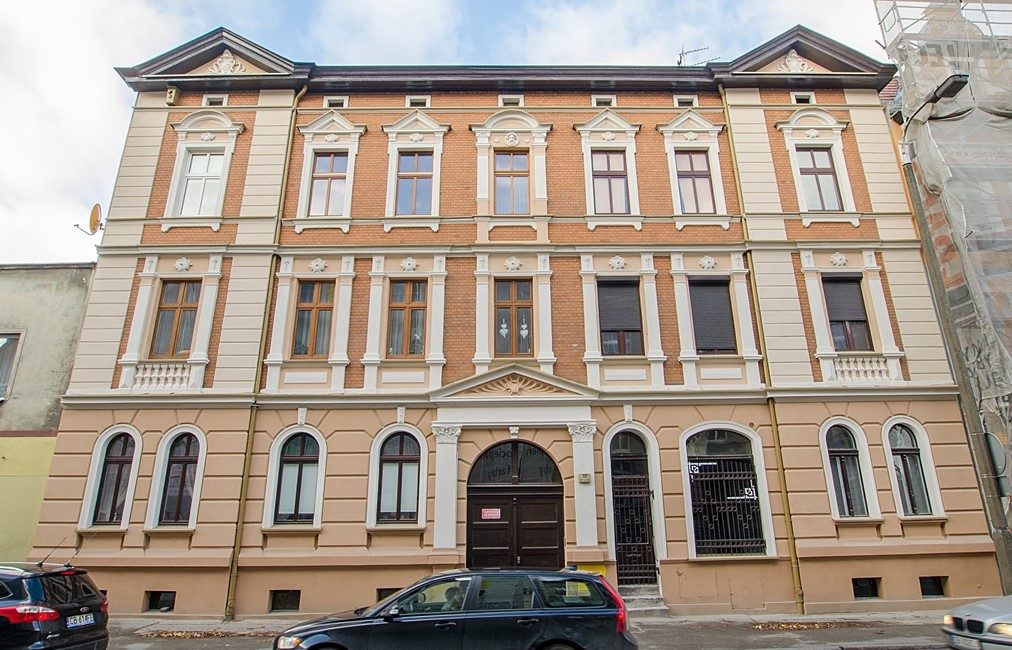
Facade after renovation

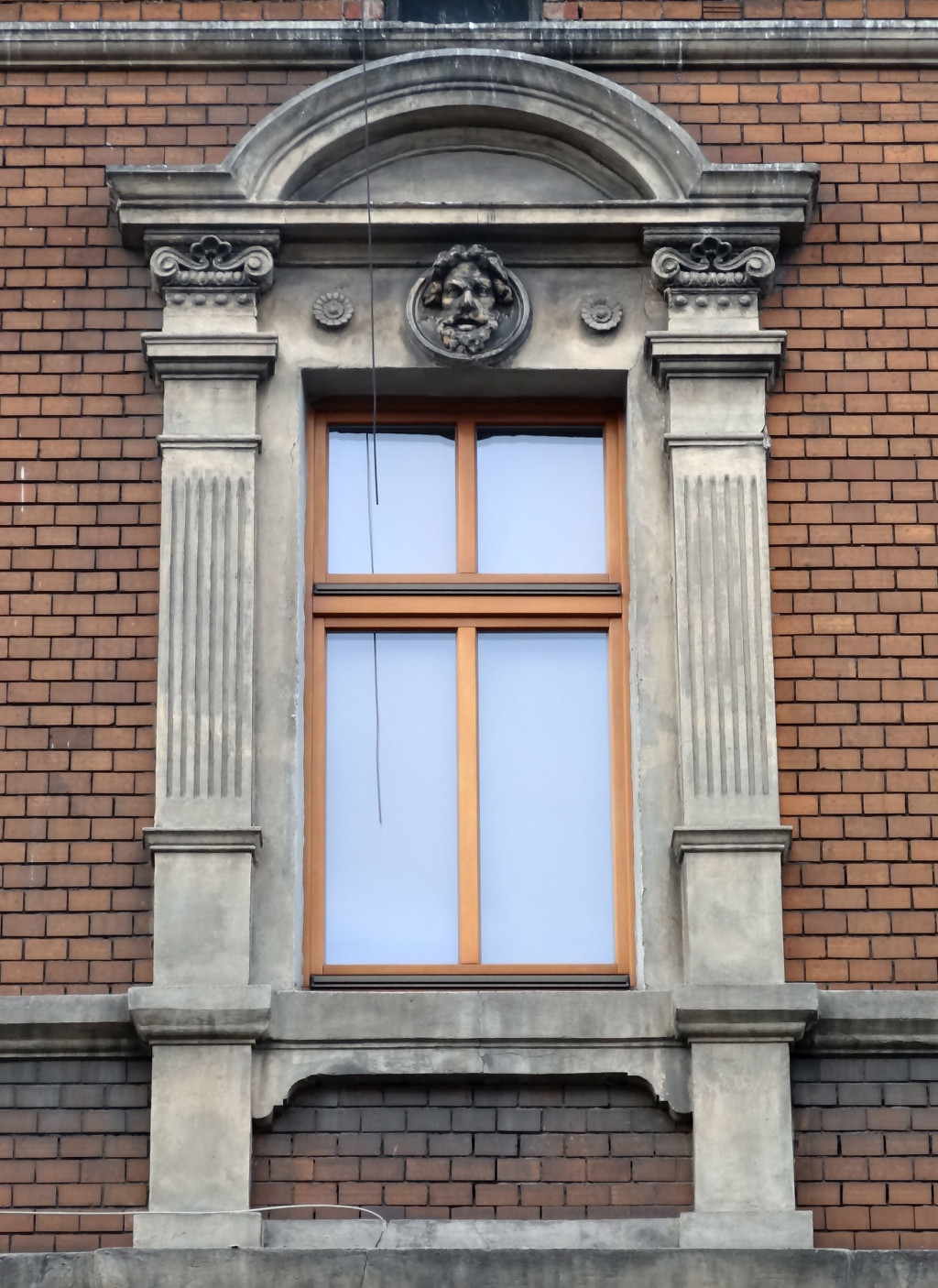
Window with pilasters, pediment and mascaron

Academic House of Culture of the Higher School of Economics at 14

In the late 19th century, the building -now gone- standing at then Viktoriastraße 3, was used as a storage area for Hermann ßietschmann, owner of a wood factory for roofing. After the first World War, another firm, Hartwig, was set up here. In the late 20th century, the buildings housed a cultural display area, owned by the Higher School of Economics (Polish: Wyższa Szkoła Gospodarki WSG) and used by municipal and private associations. It used to host in particular, the Museum of Photography of Bydgoszcz and several art galleries (e.g. Galeria nad Brdą, Galeria Debiut , Katedra Przemysłów Kreatywnych)

In February 2021, demolition of the old edifices began to give way to a real estate project called Urzecze.

A facade of the "Higher School of Economics" giving onto the river exposes a mural painting, Wake Up (English: Breakfast of Champions), realized by two local artists, Bartek Bujanowski and Bartek Świątecki. This work is a part of an ensemble of more than 20 pieces scattered around Bydgoszcz.

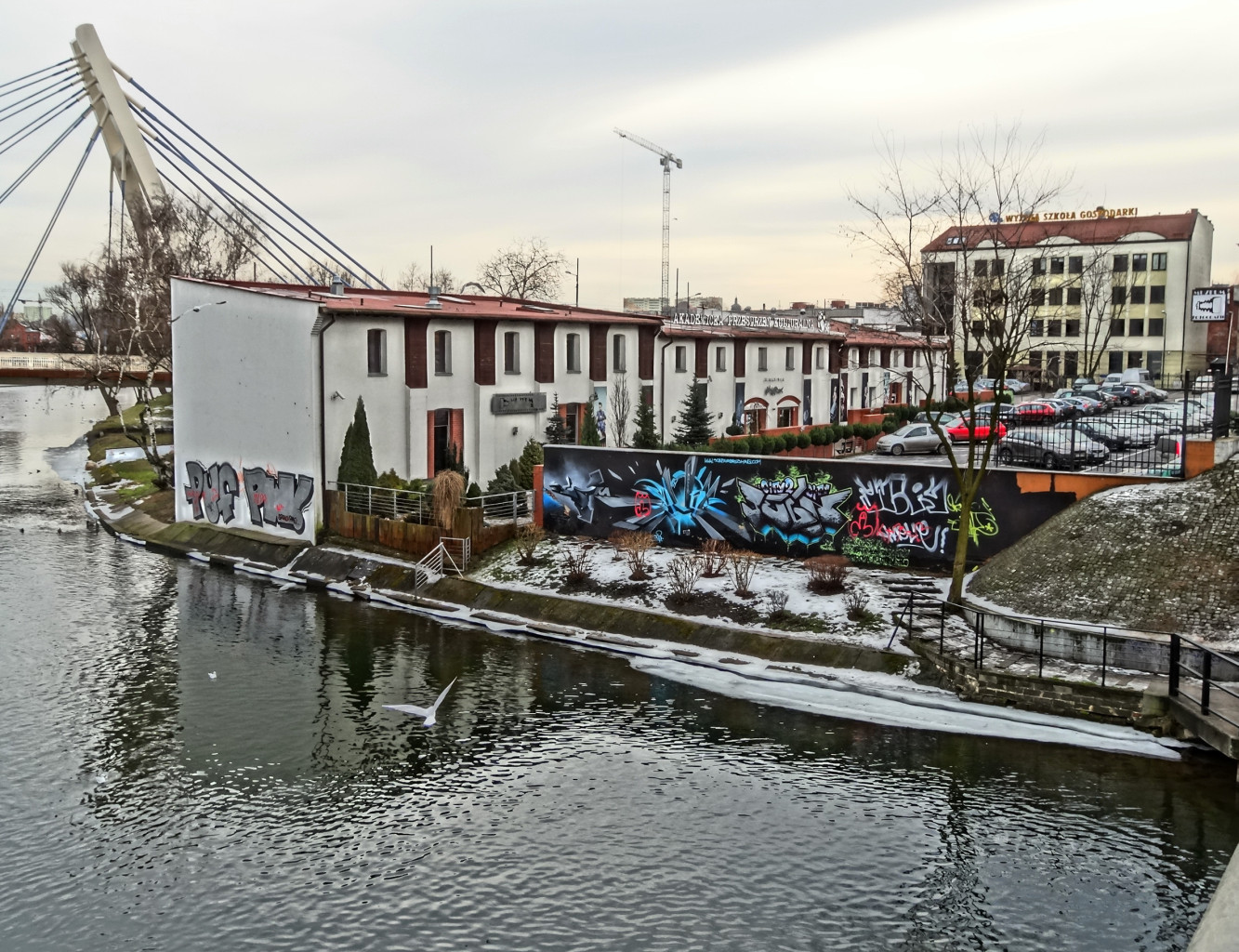
View of the complex from the bridge over the Brda river

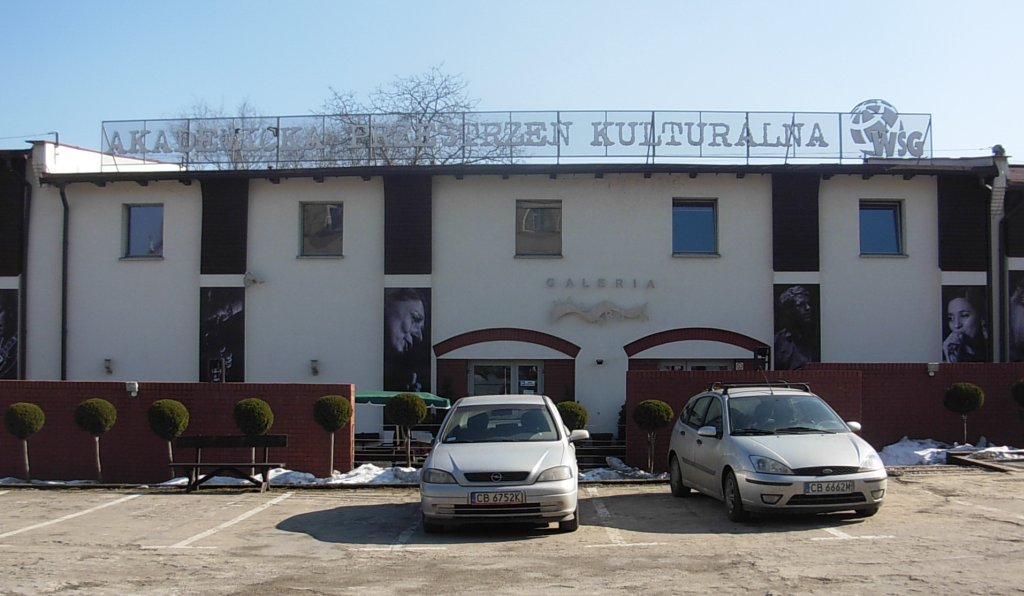
View from the street

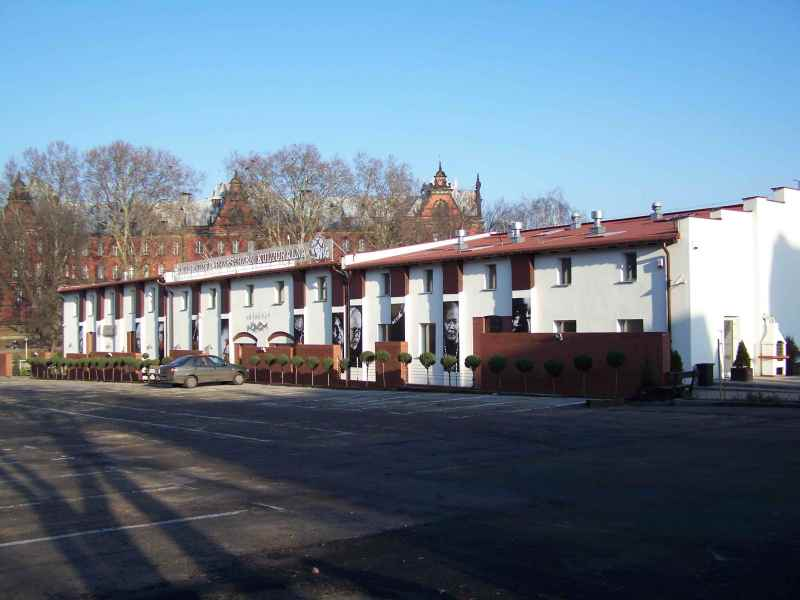
View from the street

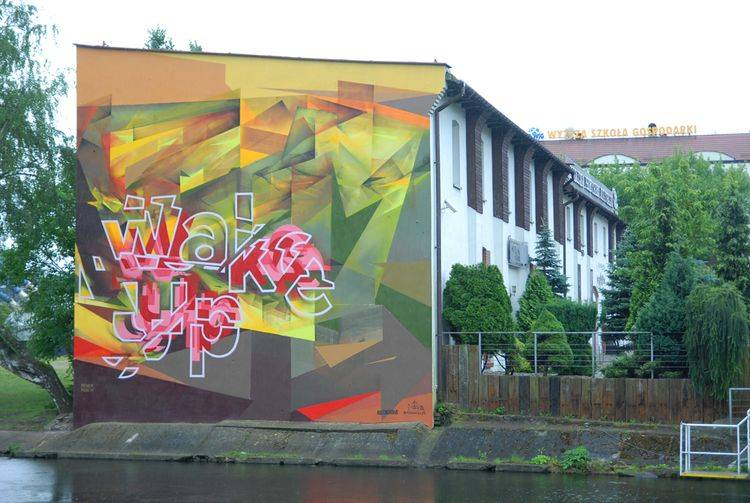
Mural Wake up

Franz Budzbon Tenement at 15

1904

Art Nouveau

This building is the last one which have been constructed in the street, at the turn of the 20th century. Its commissioner was Franz Budzbon, a restaurateur living at then Prinzenstraße 1 (house at Nr.17 today). He had been possessing the tenement till the start of the second World War.

The Art Nouveau elevation, refurbished in 2019, displays noticeable elements. Three mascarons figures, adorned with vegetal motifs towers the facade, above the last window line. Above, a dozen of smaller faces highlights the dentil-like frieze. In addition, the front-gable on the left side is garnished with pilasters, floral details, and other Art Nouveau style motifs. It bears the date of completion of the building (1904).

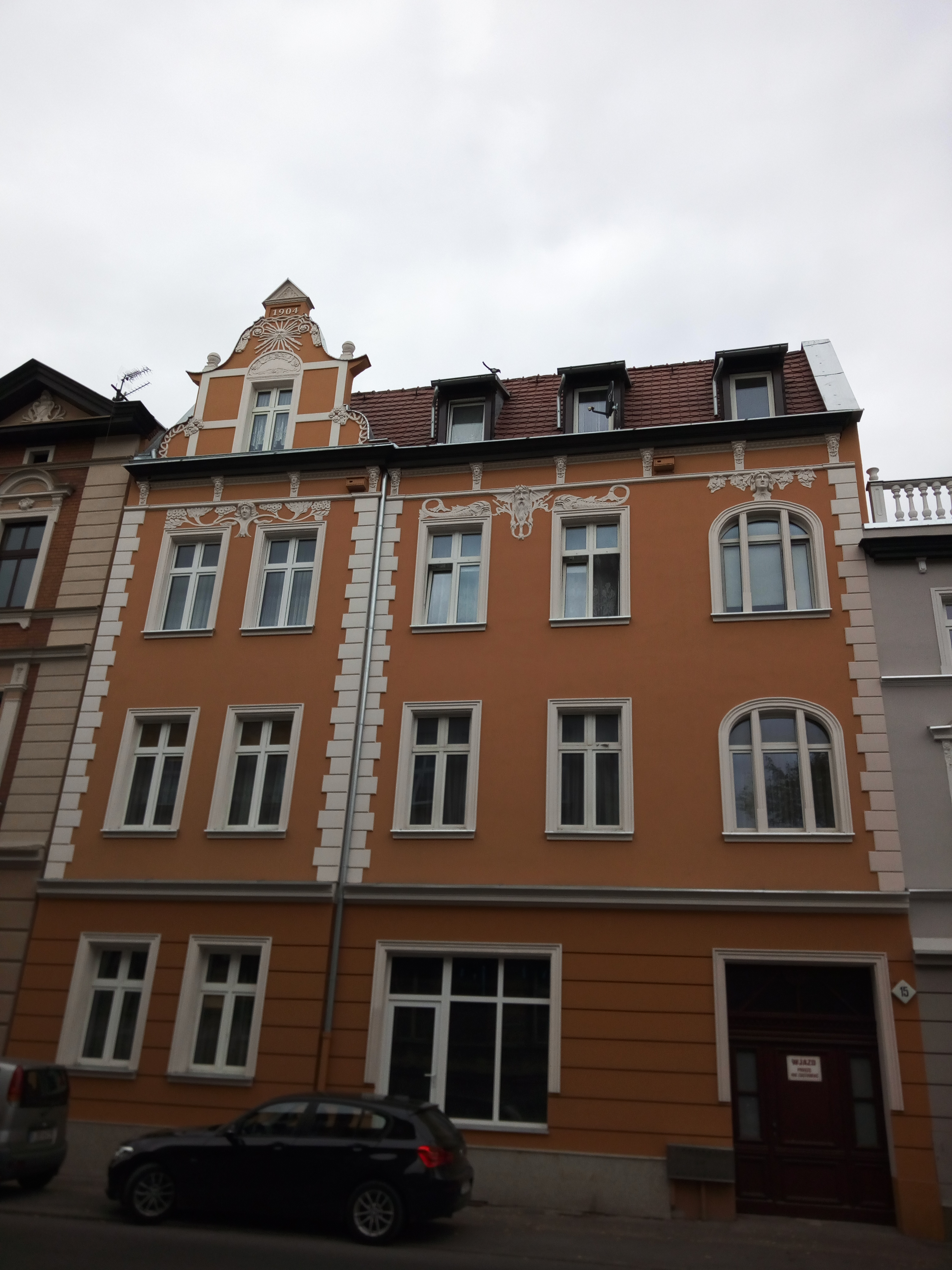
Main facade

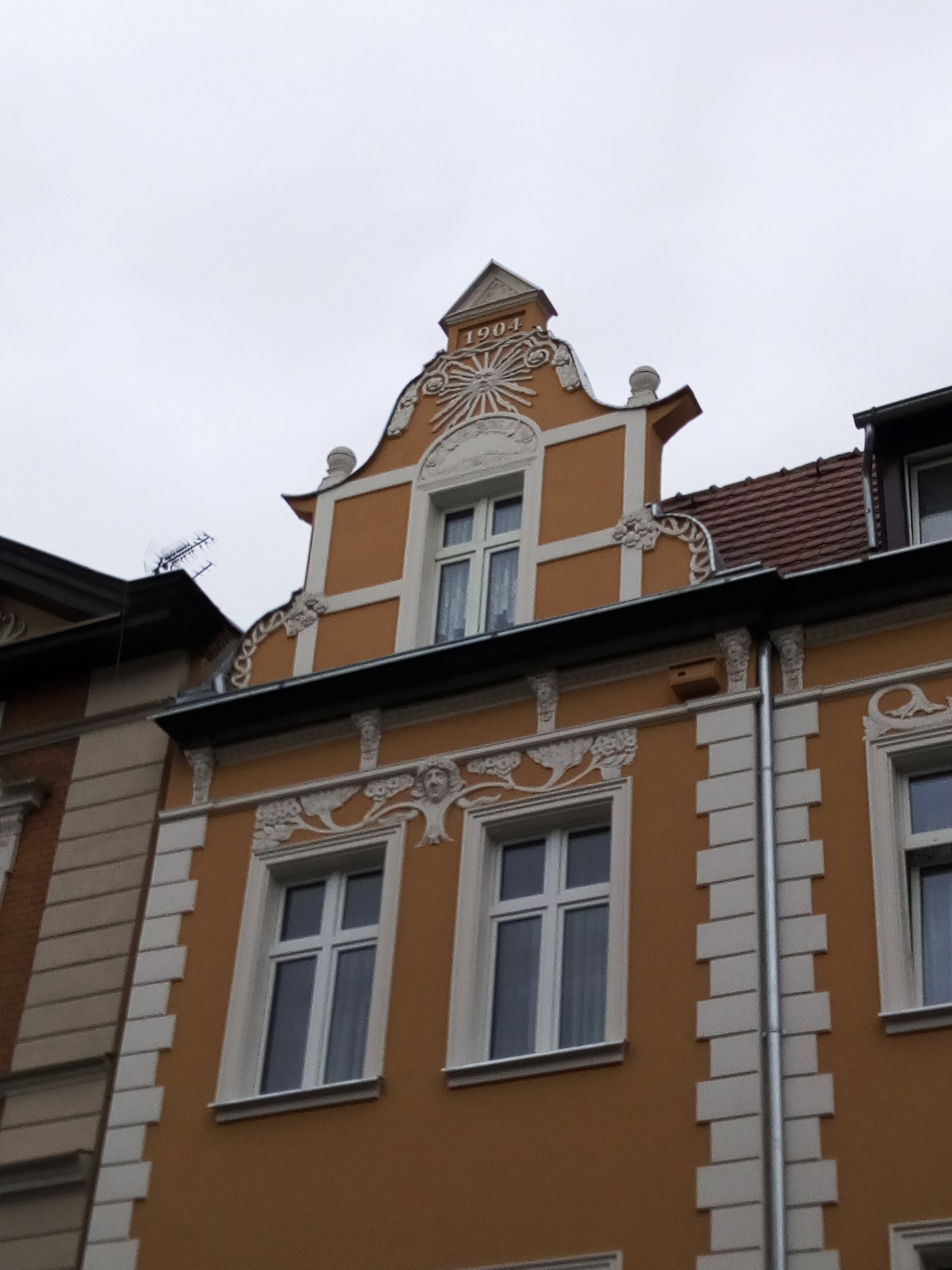
Detail of the decorated gable

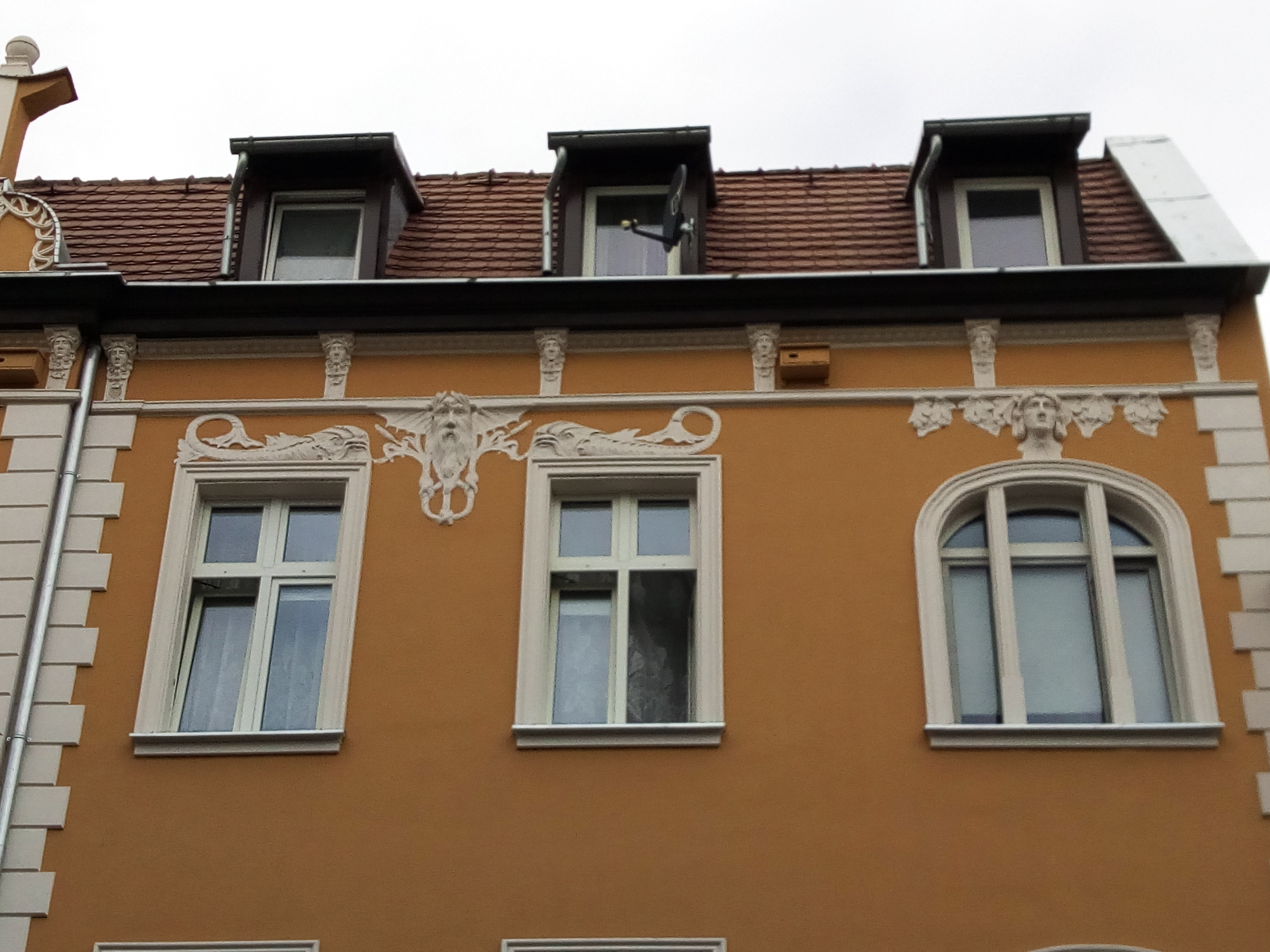
Dormers and stuccoed motifs

Queen Jadwiga bridge over the Brda river

1865, rebuilt in 1913 by Richard Kohnke

The first bridge has been completed in 1861, when in the early 1860s, Viktoriastraße was being laid out to the north, requiring a crossing of the Brda river. This brick-made construction -called Viktoriabrücke (Victoria's bridge), was designed with three arcades, 26 metres (85 ft) long and 11 metres (36 ft) wide. When Brda river Bydgoszcz section was incorporated into the Vistula-Oder waterway (1908–1917), a thorough reconstruction of the bridge was needed to meet the requirements of ship transport companies, leading to a raise of the bridge over the water and the enlargement of the arches.

Decision was made to construct an entirely new bridge (steel frame and single-span), using the innovative technology of the time. In 1912, the demolition of the old bridge started and the work on the new bridge began in May 1913. The official opening took place on August 28, 1913. It was still called Viktoriabrücke, the name change to Queen Jadwiga bridge (Polish: Most Królowej Jadwigi happened only after the re-recreation of the Polish state in 1920. Building company was Windschild and Langelott, which seat was located on Danzigerstraße 153 (now Gdańska street, 34) and factory in neighbouring Białe Błota. Designer was professor Richard Kohnke from Gdańsk: he incorporated in the project four decorative Art Nouveau fish heads and four Art Nouveau lampposts (designed by W. Kaliński) on the bridgehead.

The bridge was mined in 1939, but despite a firing of explosive material on September 4, it did not collapse. During the night of the January 22, 1945, area residents (mainly rail workers) defused several bombs placed on the bridge and connected to a detonator. This action made the Queen Jadwiga bridge the only Bydgoszcz crossing in the city center that survived unscathed through World War II period, notwithstanding some missile impacts on its structure. In 2001, Bydgoszcz bridge works company Promost has carried out a major overhaul of the construction, restoring its former glory. It comprised pavement, sidewalks and re-placement on the bridgehead of original Art Nouveau, back to their original location. In addition, a night lighting system of the bridge was set up in 2005.

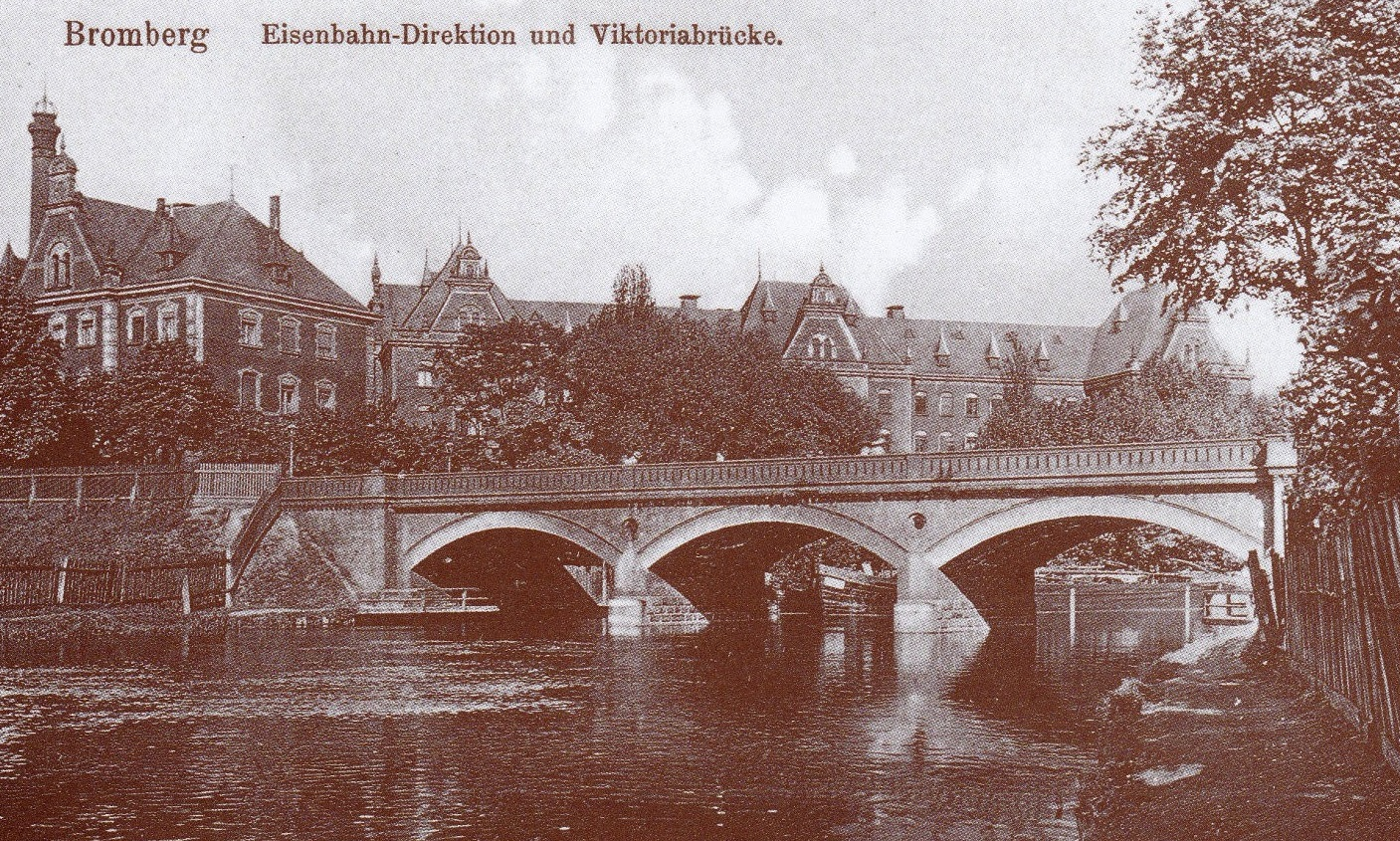
First brick bridge ca 1908

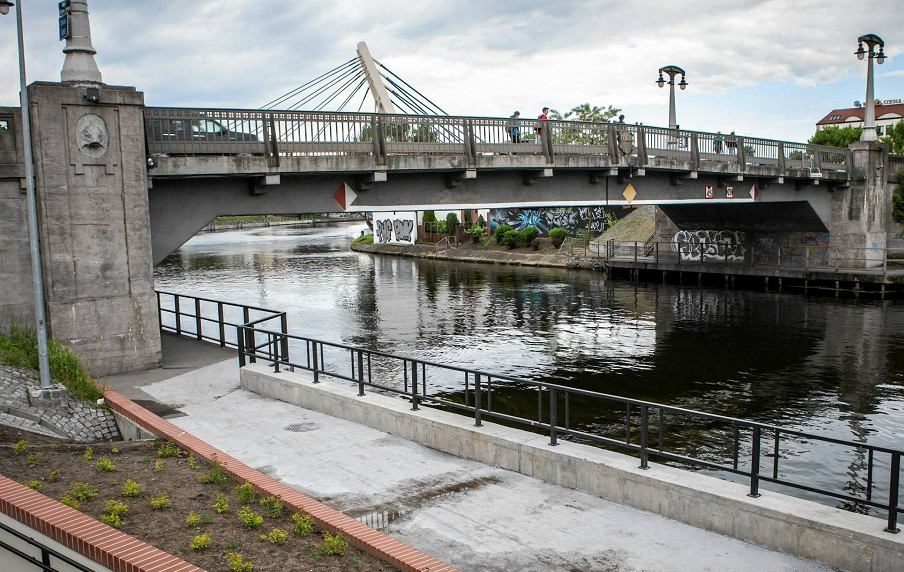
Queen Jadwiga Bridge

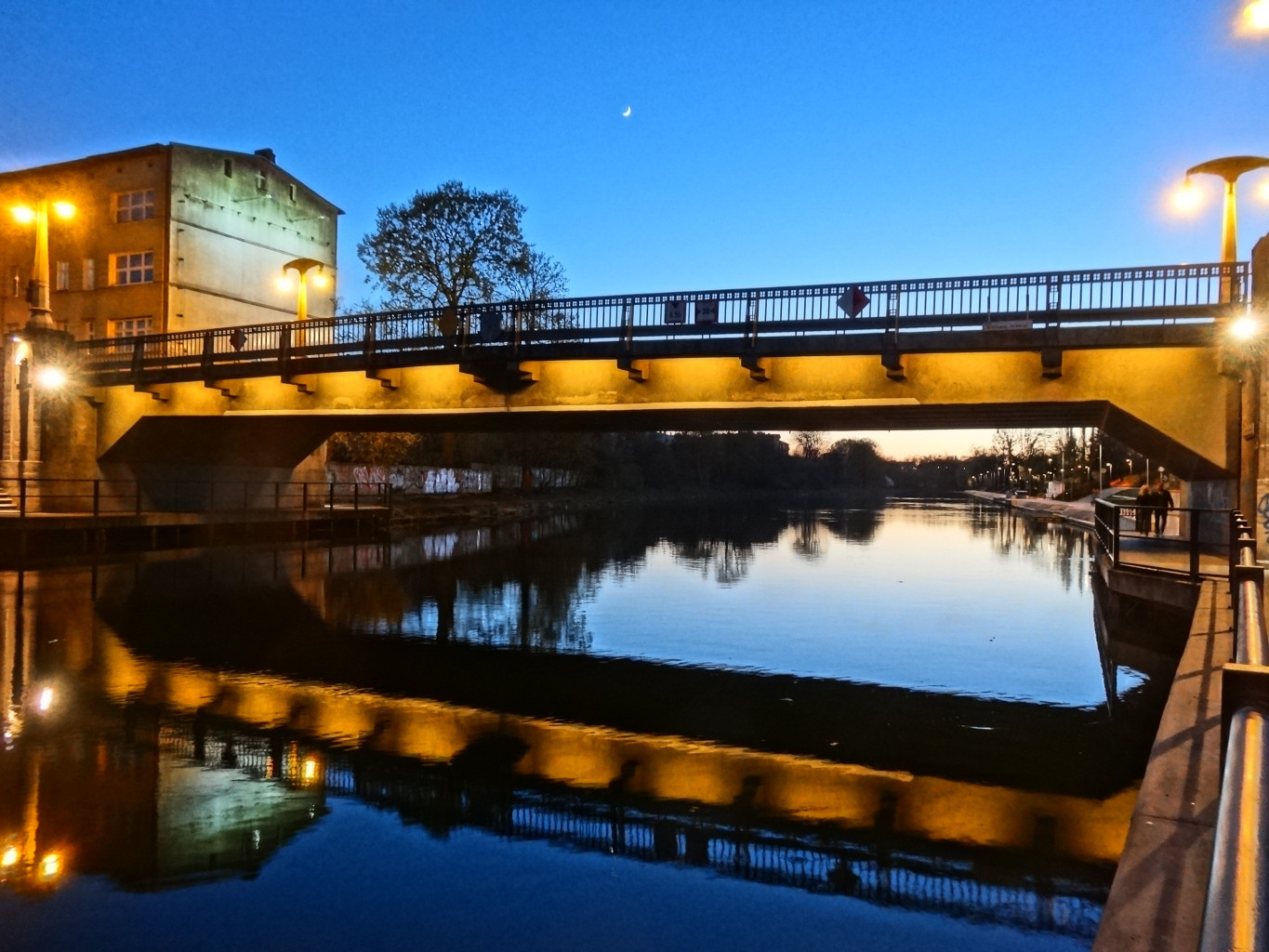
By night

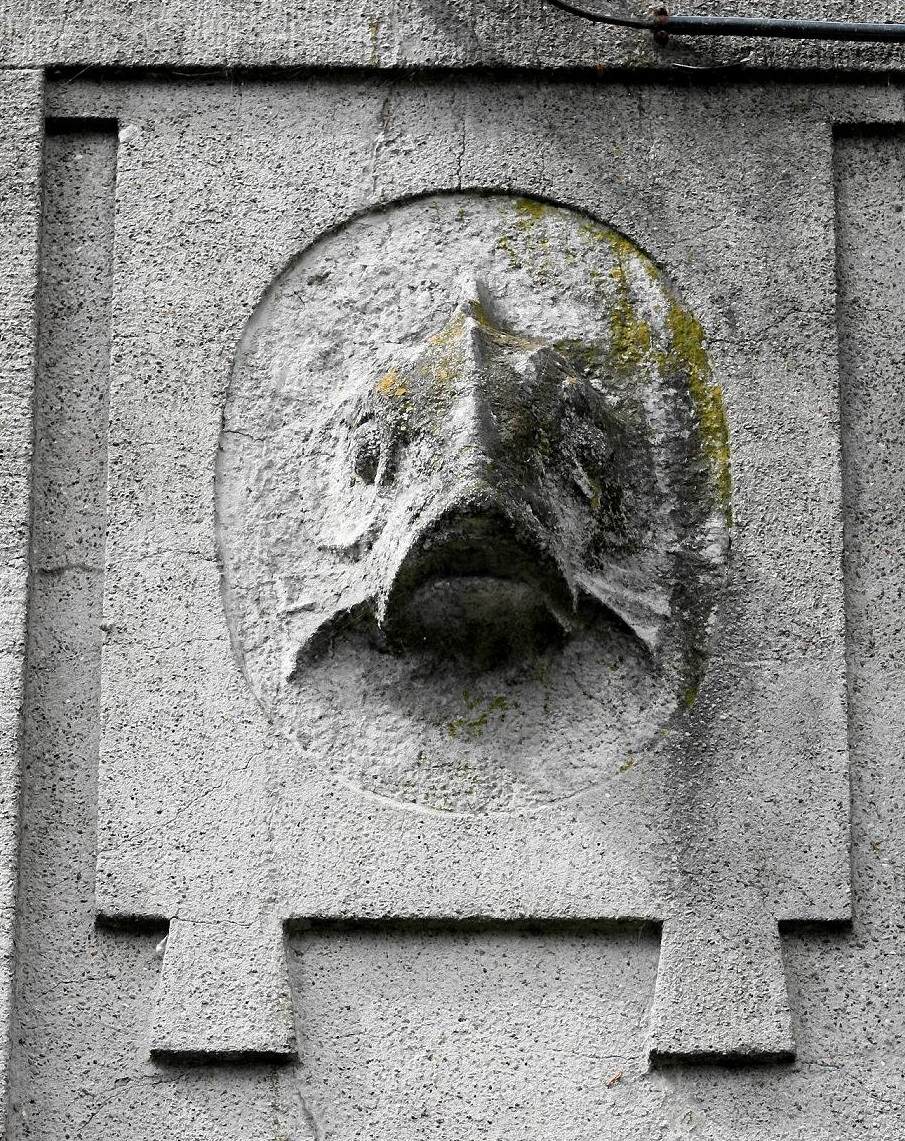
Fish head decoration on bridgeheads

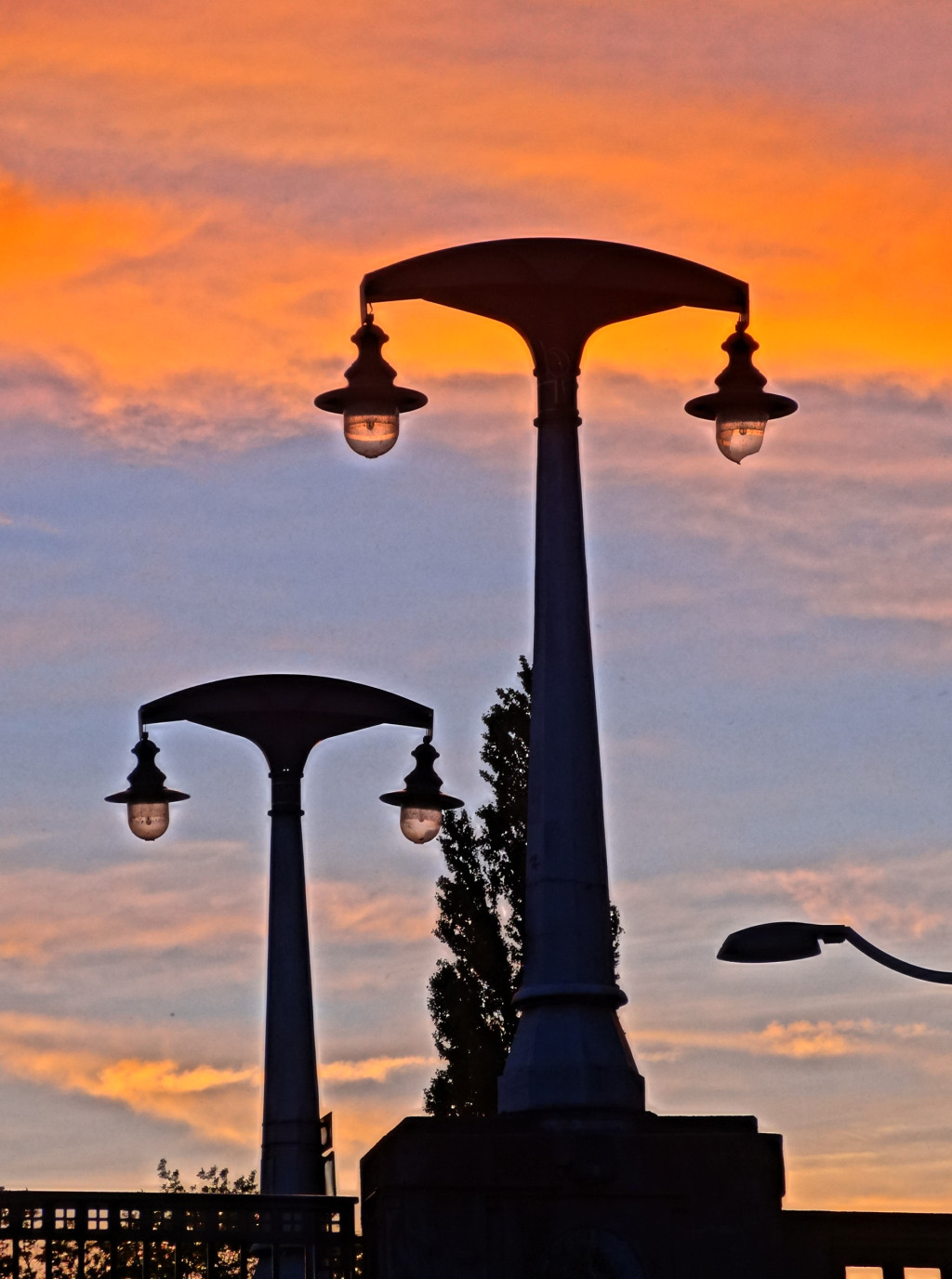
Art Nouveau lampposts

Building at 16

1890-1891

Dutch Mannerism

This building, built originally on a plot belonging to local Prussian General Commission, soon moved to the hand of the Prussian state railways at the end of the 19th century. After 1920, Polish authorities kept the same scheme and gave to the Polish State Railways (Polish: Polskie Koleje Państwowe, PKP) the responsibility for the edifice. PKP set up there an occupational medicine center. Today, the medical activity is still present, since the building houses a medical centre with several different specialities.

The brick building complements perfectly the other large mannerism edifice in the close area, the Prussian Eastern Railway Headquarters. Although it lost after the second World war a front-gable, it kept preserved its other architectural details, in particular the avant-corps bearing the grand stone balcony giving onto the street.

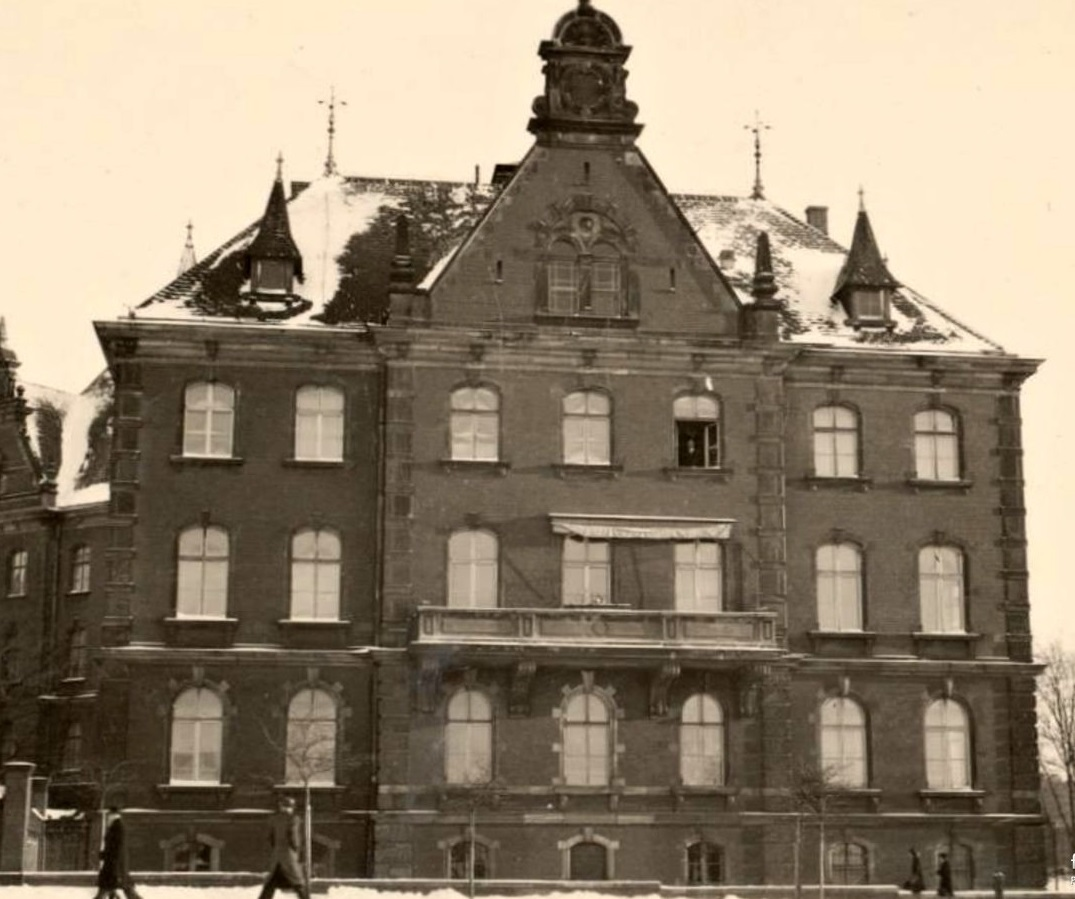
Building ca 1941

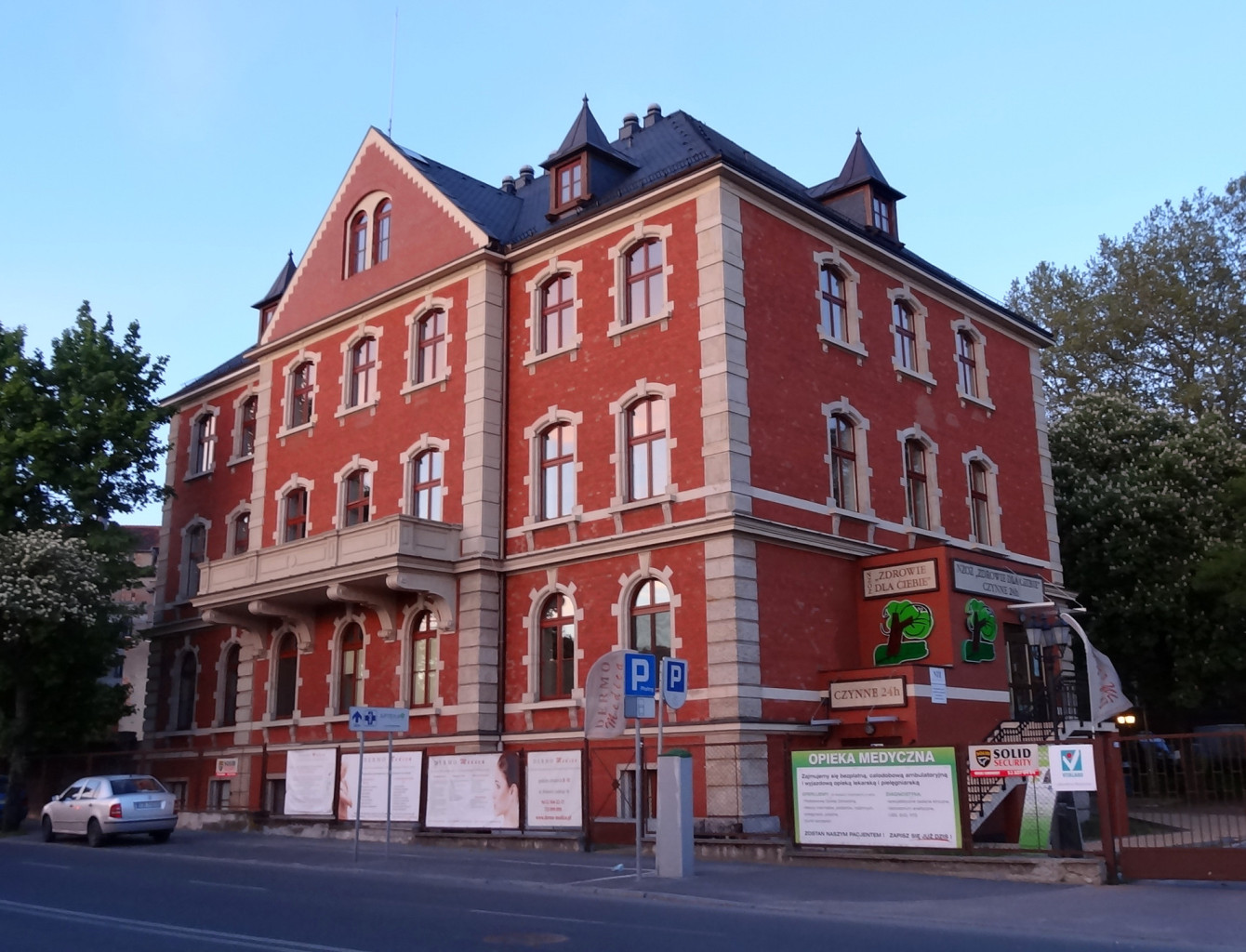
Building from the street

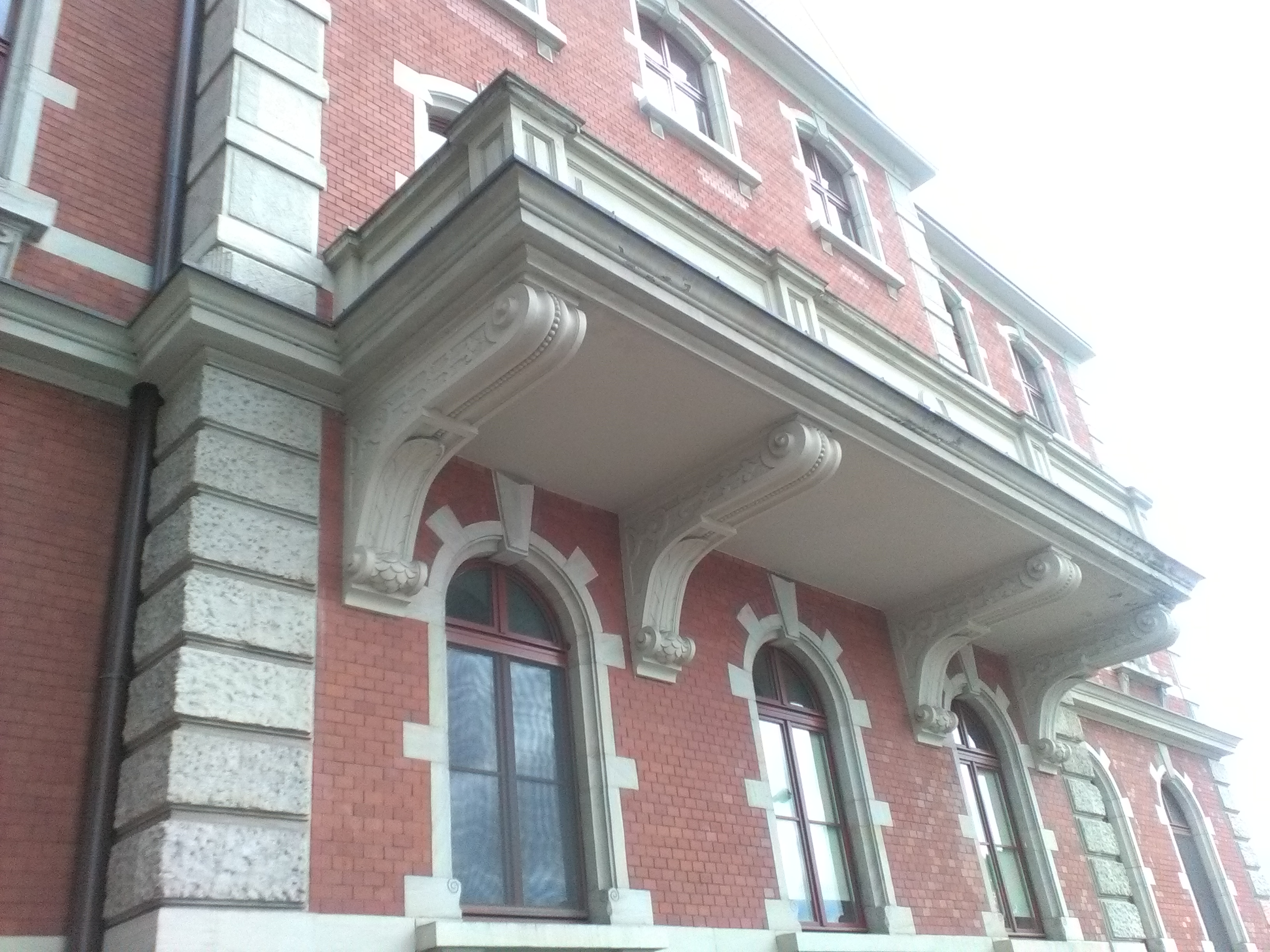
Balcony detail

Tenement at 17, corner with Łokietka street

1850-1875

Eclecticism, Art Nouveau

This building may be the oldest one in the street, according to the Municipal Register of Historic Monuments. Earliest recorded landlord was Georg Affeldt, a rentier, in 1880. From 1900 to the outbreak of WWII, Franz Budzbon, also owner of Nr.15, had his restaurant located there.

The corner tenement shows early elements of Art Nouveau style, in particular in the remaining motifs of both frontages: a cartouche above the corner entrance displays a man figure, all first level windows boast pediments and crossheads with vegetal motifs or flowered woman heads, in the spirit of Art Nouveau ornamentation. The 2019 overhaul of the building replaced back the statue above the entrance.

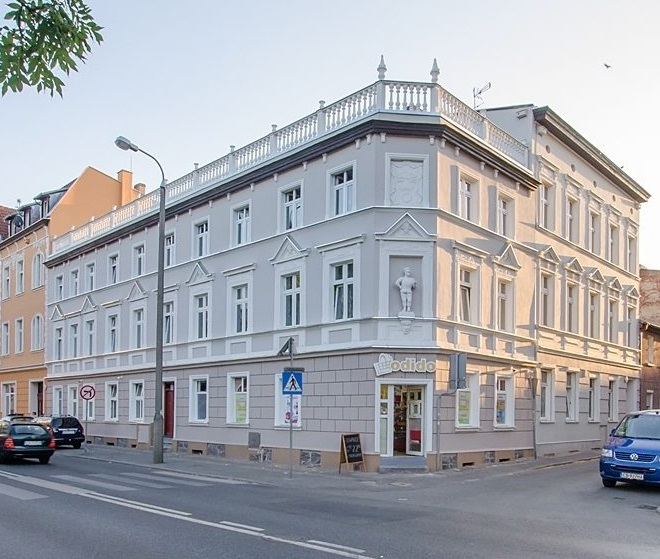
Corner view

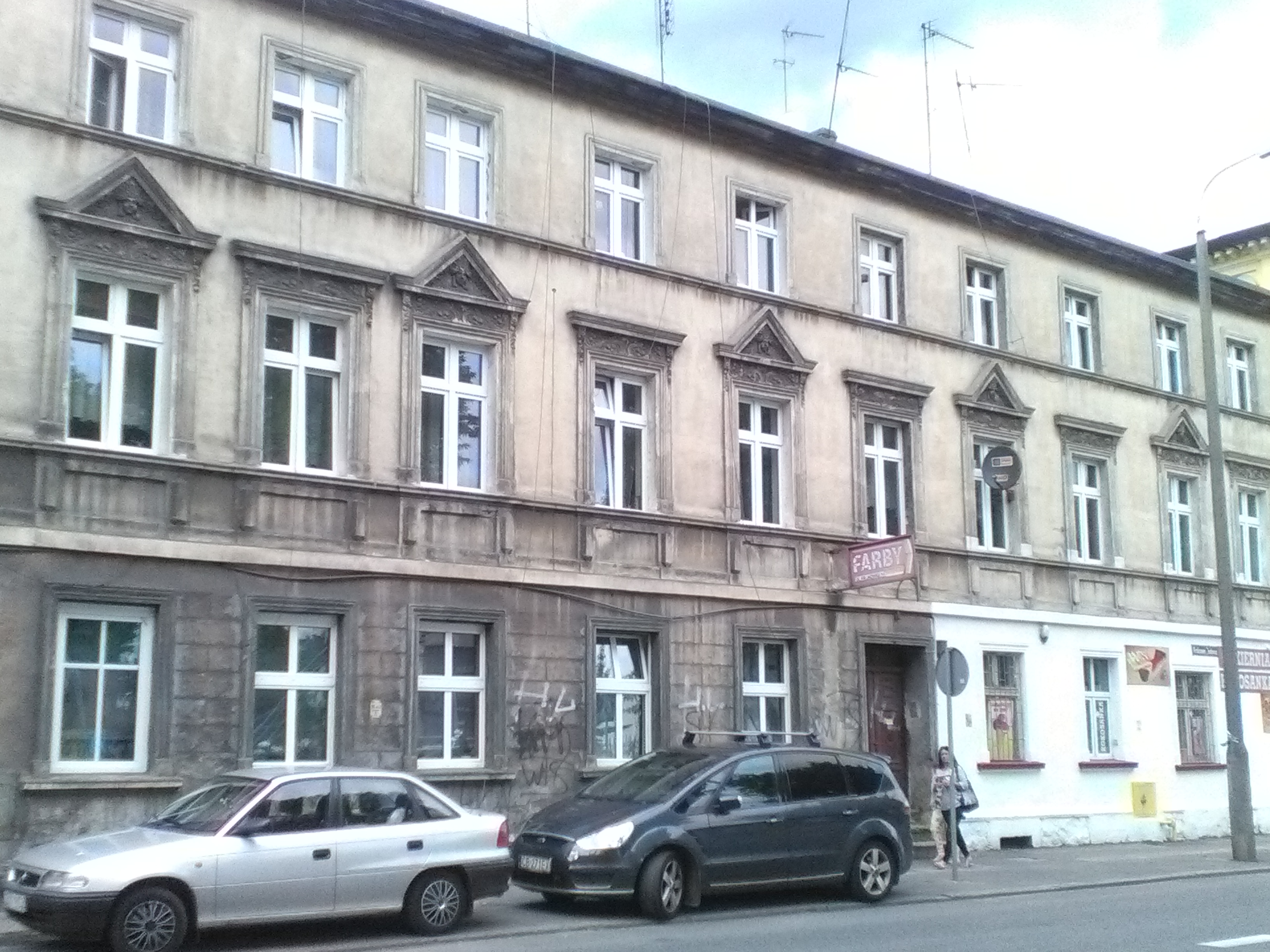
Facade on the street

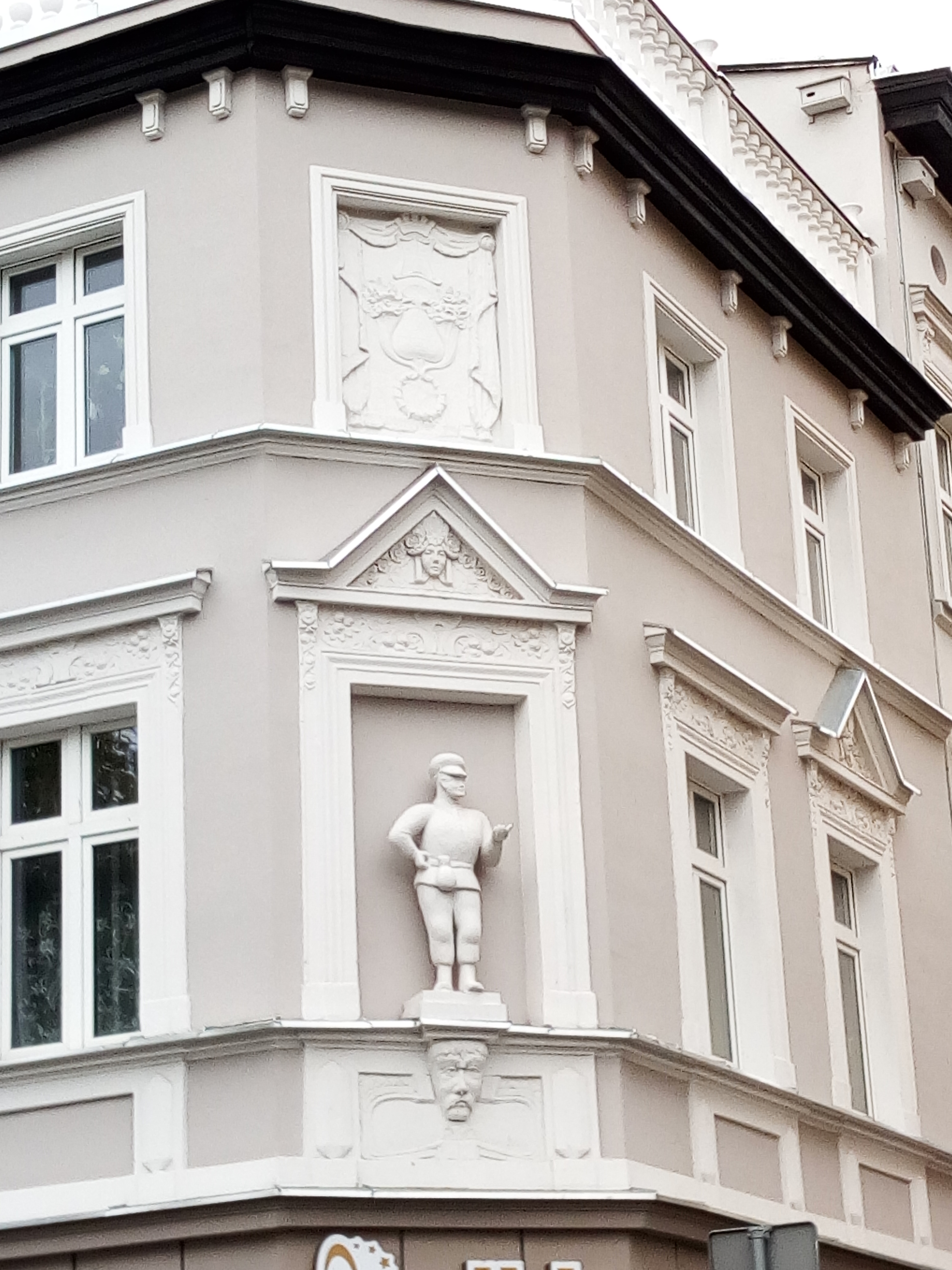
Statue and stuccoes

Tenement at 19, corner with Łokietla street

1875-1900

Neo-Renaissance

This building has been first owned by a rentier, Carl Kaminski in 1894. He still has his initials above the main entrance, held by putti. Carl Kamisnki was also the owner of the building at Nr.21.

This tenement house displays a style inspired by Italian Renaissance. The facade shows bossage, with arched windows on the ground floor. The upper storeys received a rich decoration: stuccoed motifs, pilasters, mascarons, balustrade. The house is crowned with a fourth floor boasting an ornamental table corbel cornice. Two large bay windows break the symmetry of the ensemble, both towering entrances and both with wooden loggias on the second floor. This neo-Renaissance townhouse has been beautifully renovated in 2016.

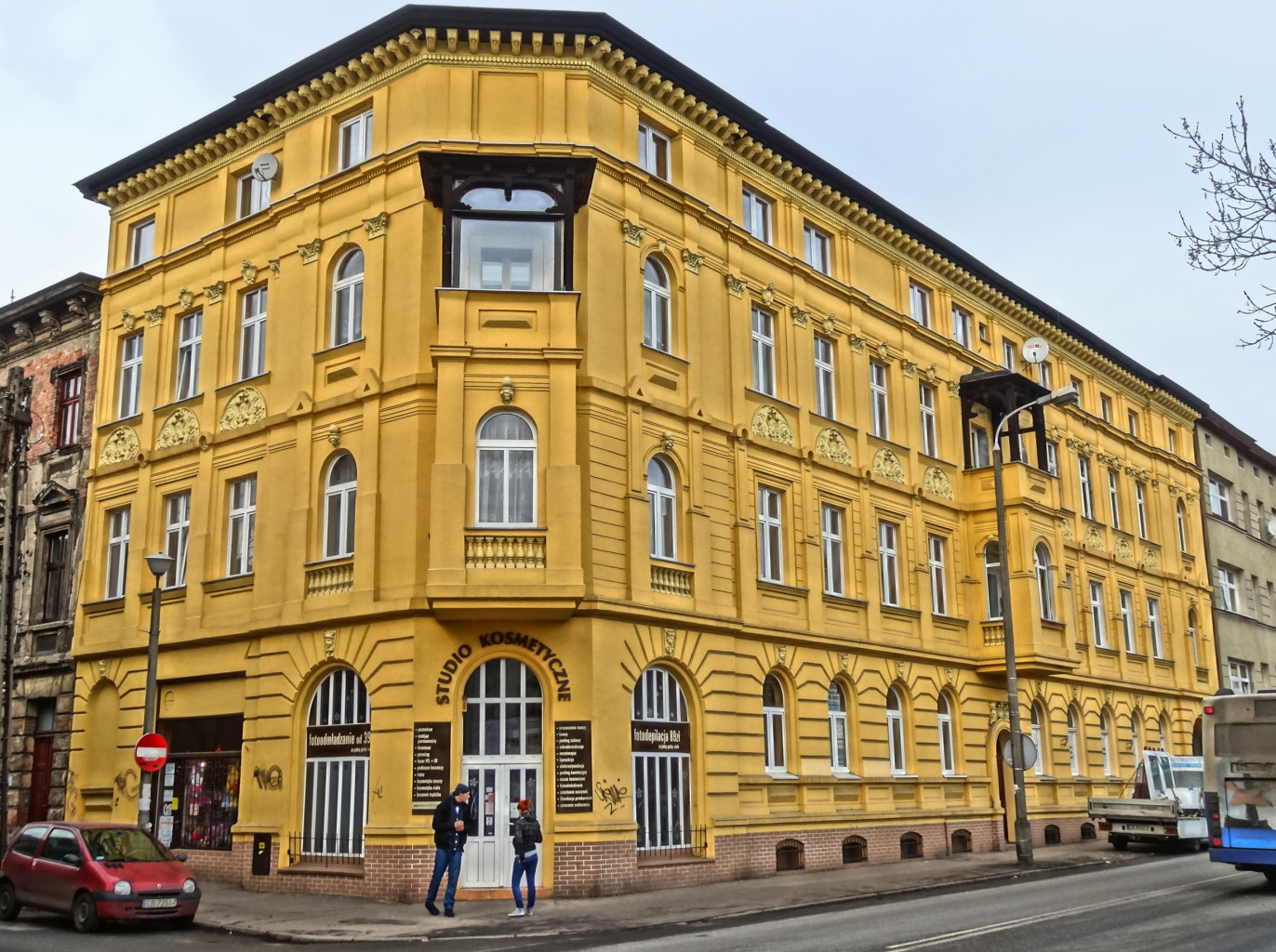
Main facade

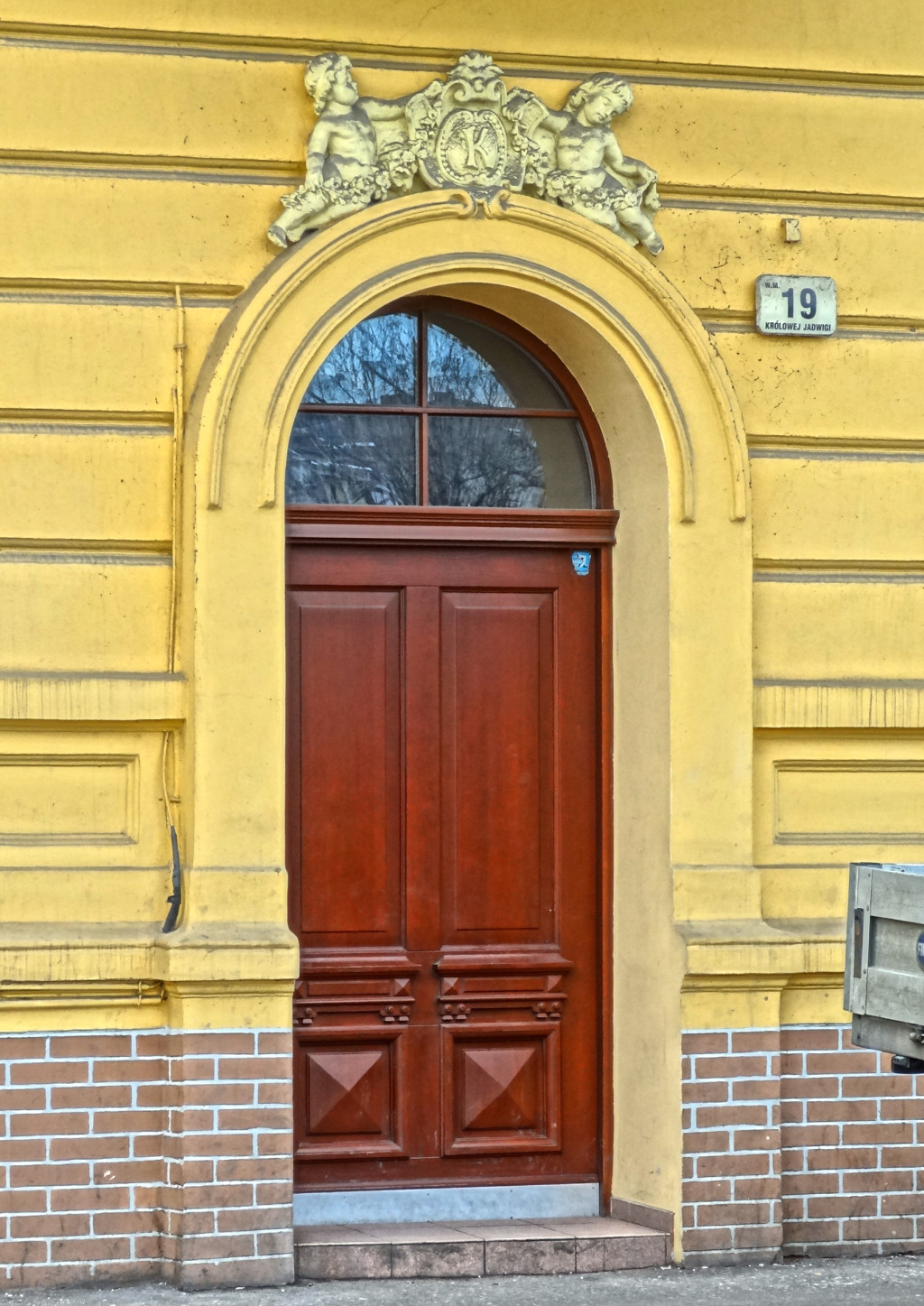
Street entrance with K initial of the first landlord

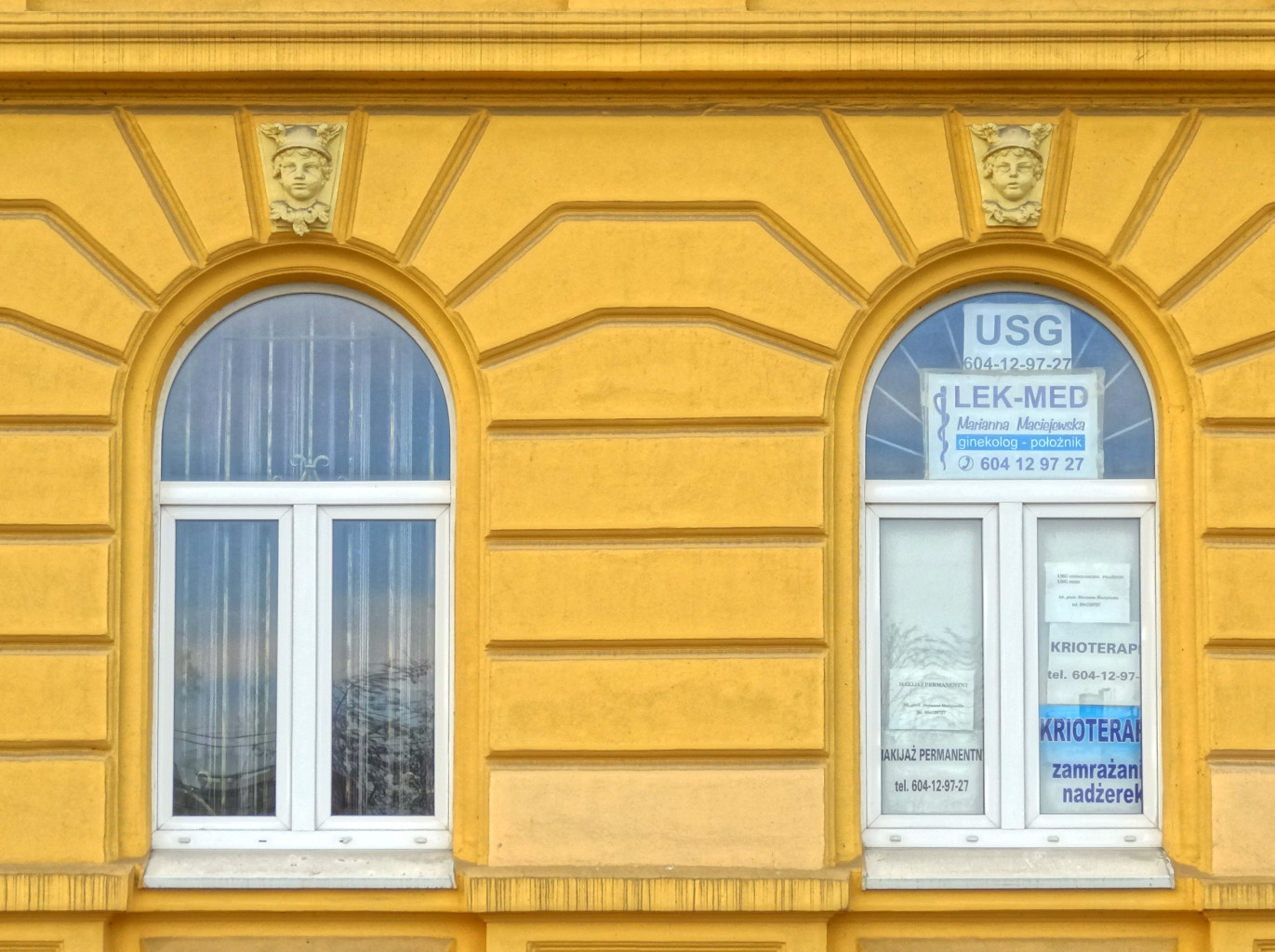
Windows and mascarons

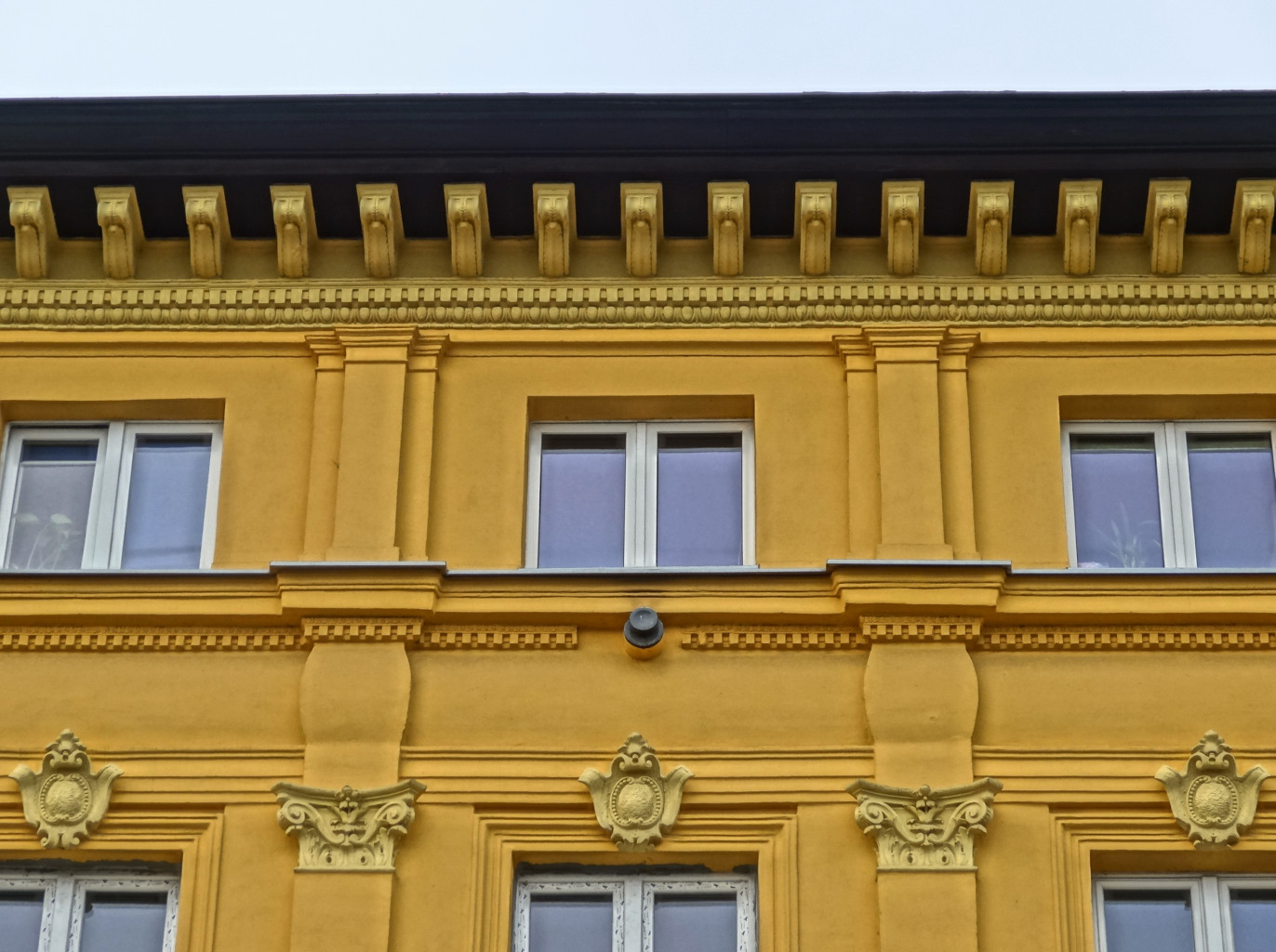
Elevation top, with adorned cornice

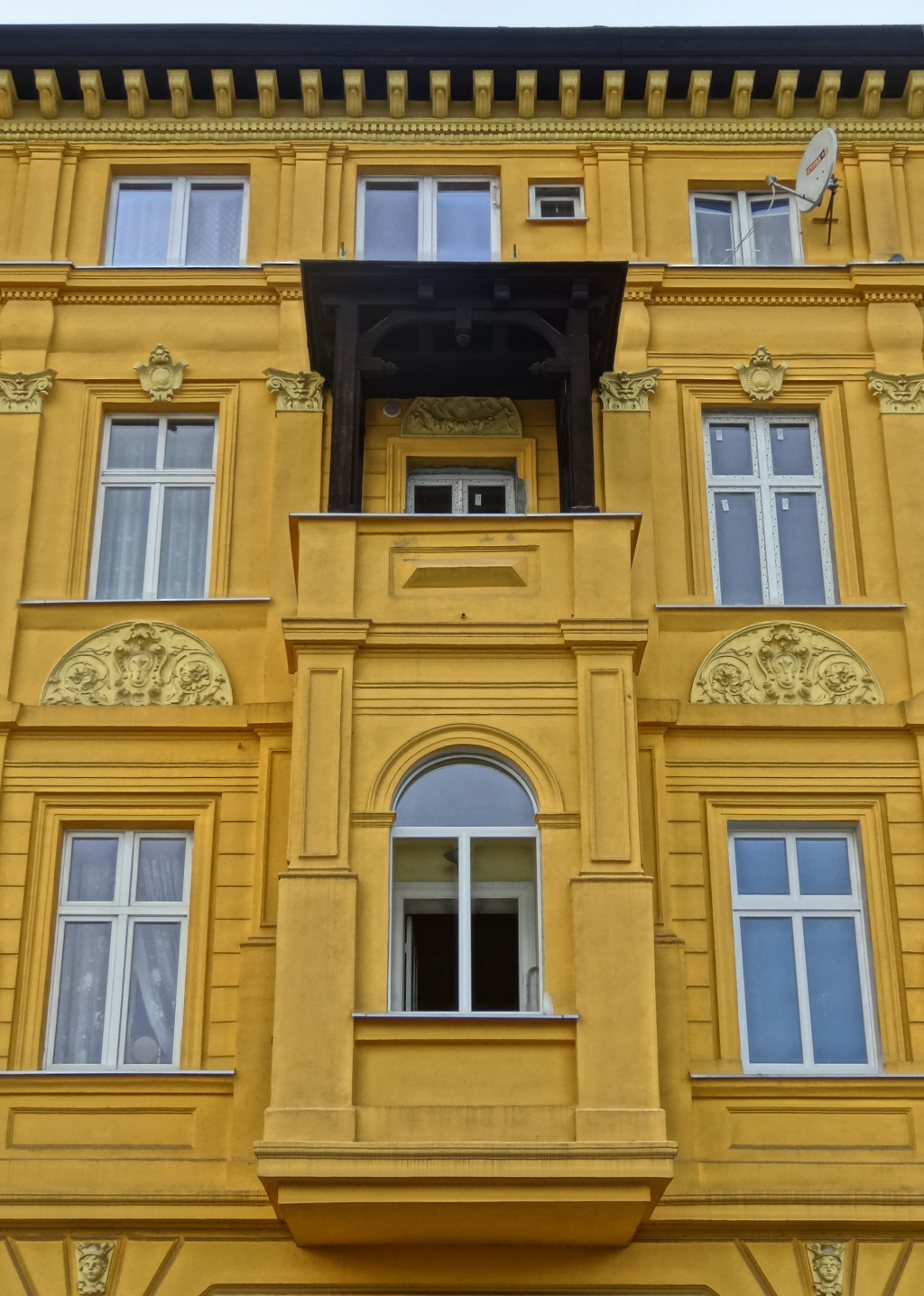
Bay window

Astoria Swimming pool at 23

The pool has been built in 1962, at the location of an old harbour on the Brda. It is the oldest swimming facility in activity in the city. In 2016, municipal authorities have decided to tear down the whole complex and built a new facility, including a 50m Olympic-size with a partially mobile roof and seating for 450 people.

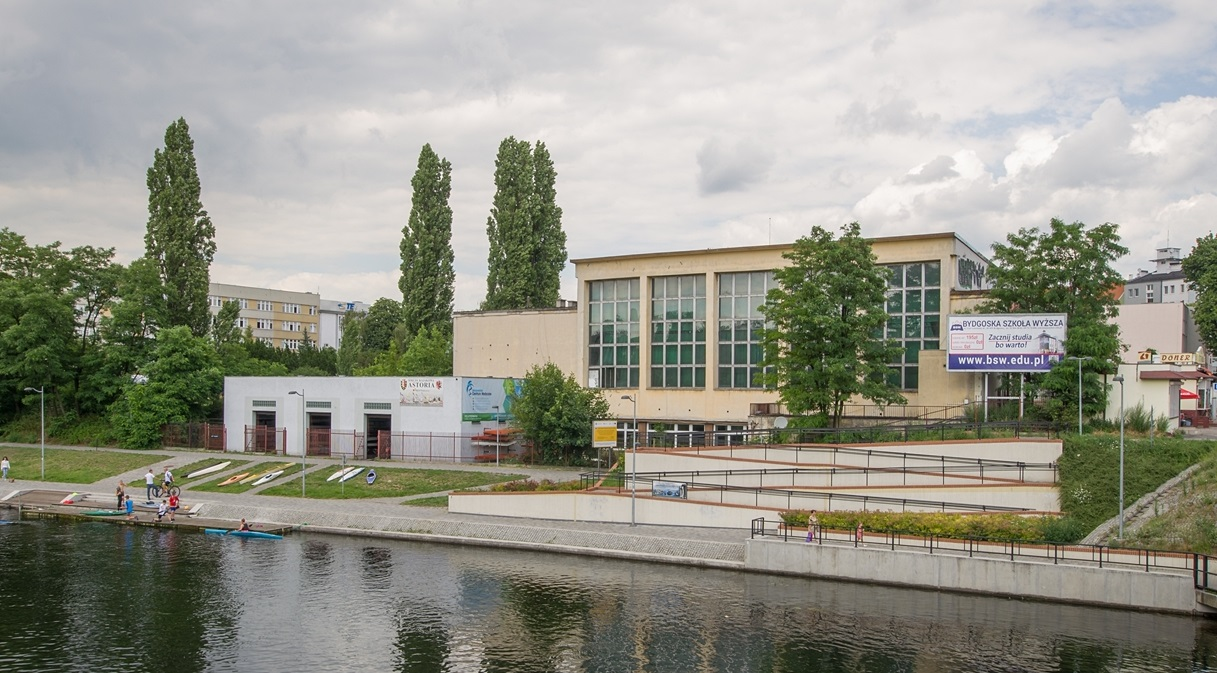
Pool in 2016, view from the bridge

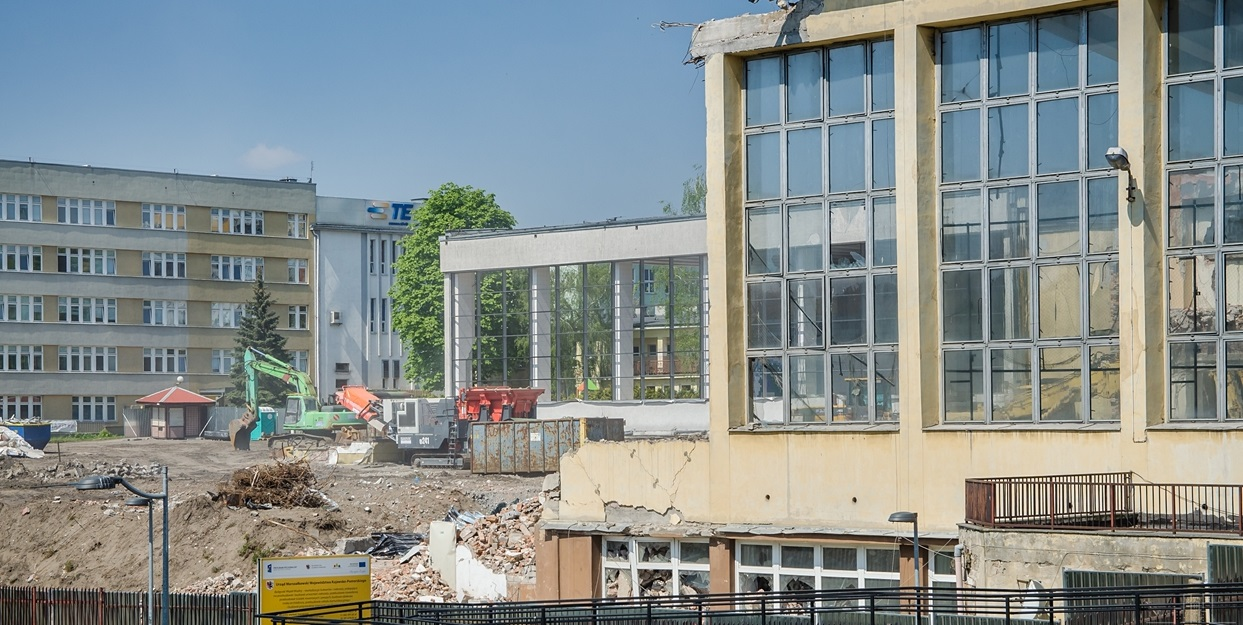
2017: demolition in progress

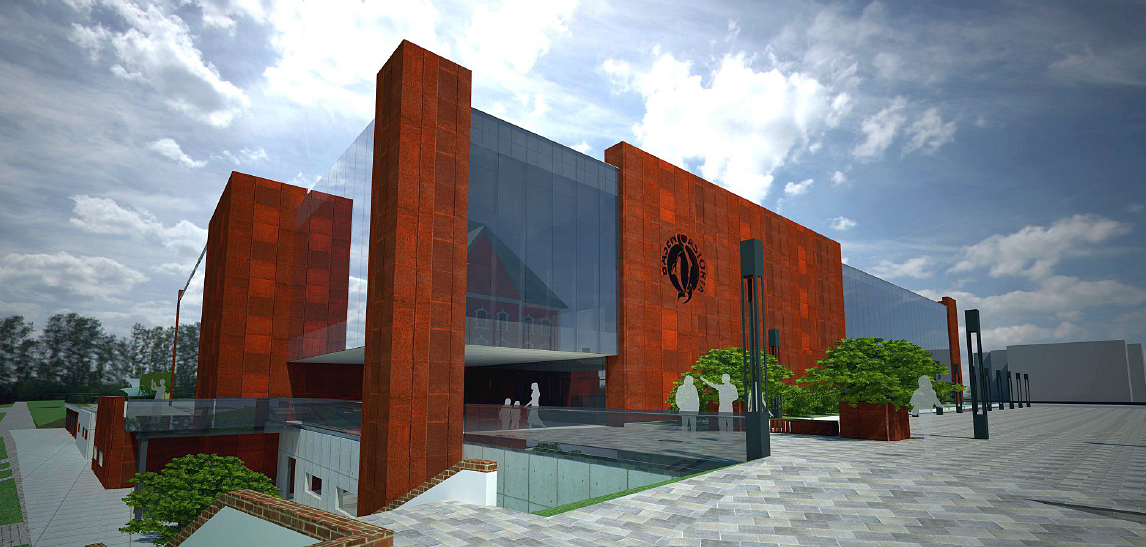
Artist view of the future swimming complex

Villa Dyck at 25

1898, by Fritz Weidner

Eclecticism

This building has been built at the end of the 19th century for Hermann Dyck, who ran there his factory producing steam-powered saw for mills. It kept this role and its owner till the recreation of the Polish state in 1920, when its focus changed dramatically: in 1923–1924, the edifice housed the Commercial High School (Polish: Liceum Handlowo), established by the Chamber of Commerce of Pomerania, the only school of this type at the time in the province. It survived the second World War and left the premises only in 1974, when the "Maria Dąbrowska" School of Commerce moved to Kaliska street 10. Today, the building hosts Bydgoszcz District Office of Measures.

This building lost all of its architectural decoration after the war and several unfortunate re-constructions. The villa was the first realization of Fritz Weidner in Bydgoszcz.

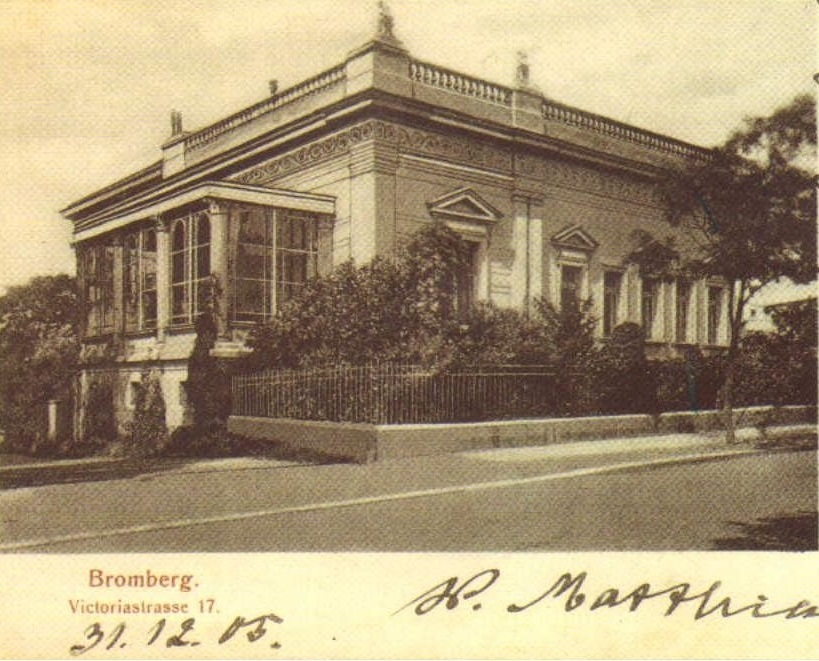
Building ca 1905

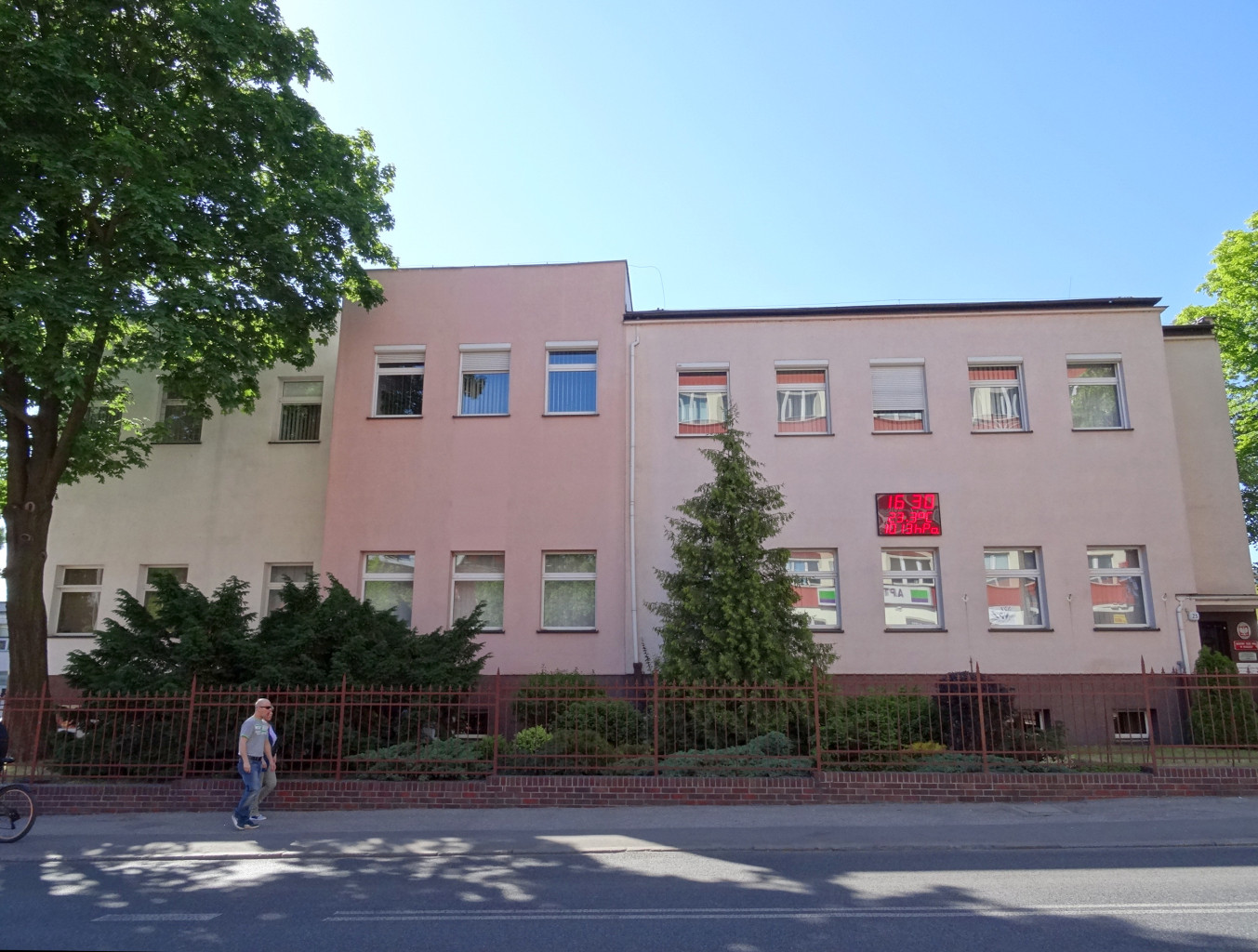
View from the street

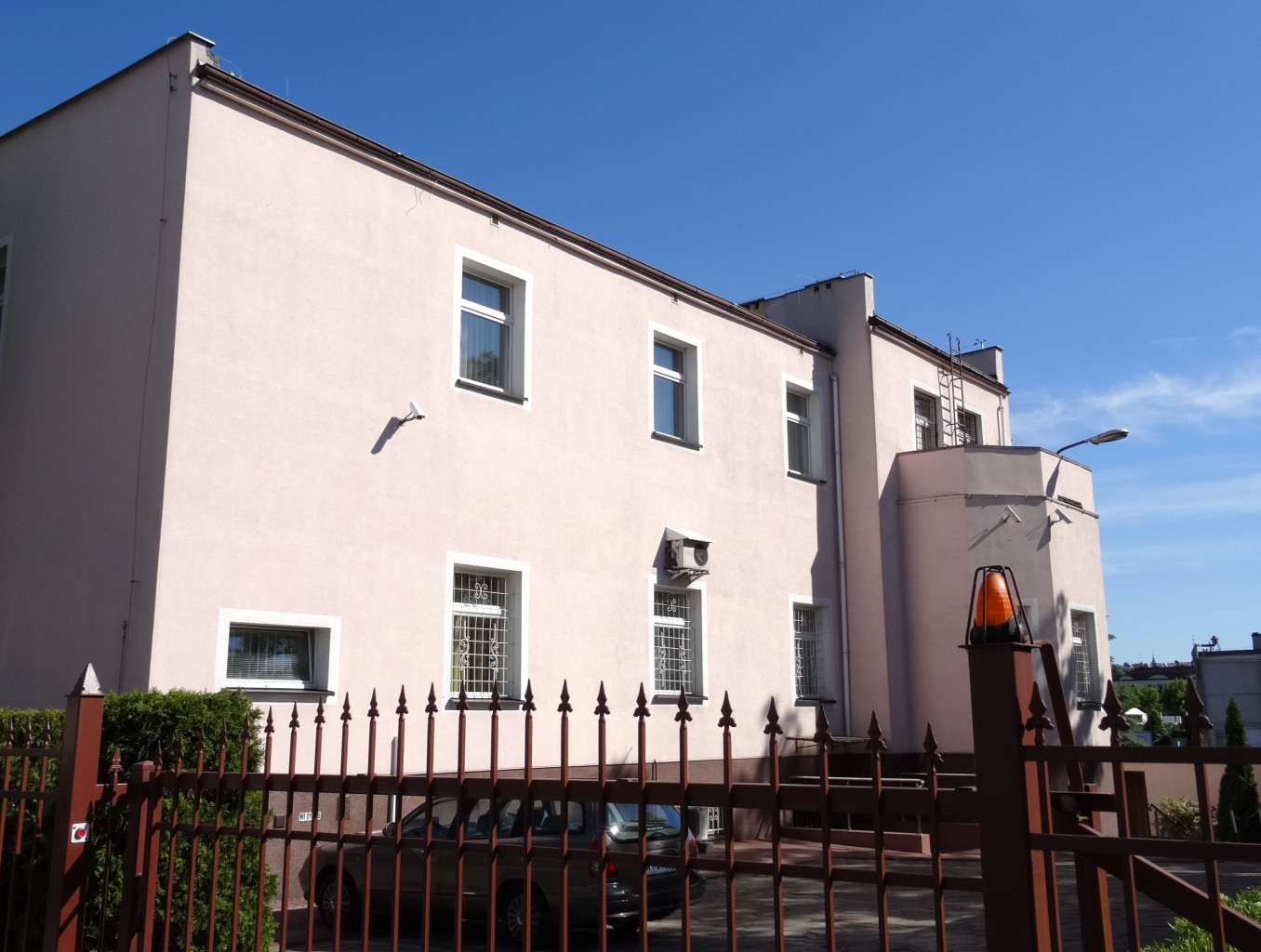
Back view

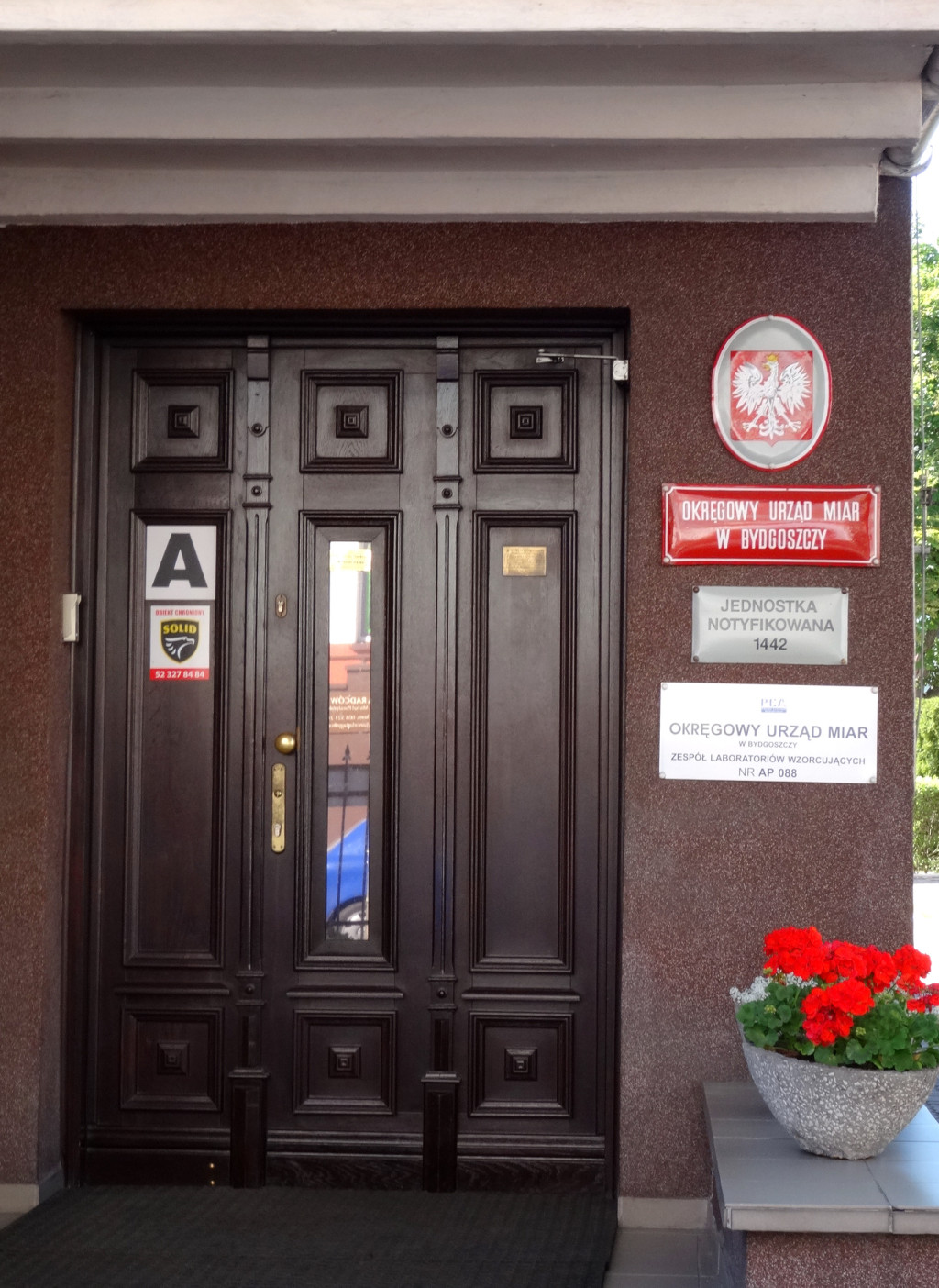
Main door

== See also ==
- Garbary Street
- Bydgoszcz
- Bydgoszcz Architects (1850-1970s)
- Ludwig Buchholz's tannery in Bydgoszcz

== Bibliography ==
- Materiały z konferencji: Przy "Moście Królowej Jadwigi" - Jerzego Sulimy-Kamińskiego. Kronika Bydgoska (in Polish). Bydgoszcz: Towarzystwo Miłosnikow Miasta Bydgoszczy - Bydgoskie Towarzystwo Naukowe. 22 May 2002. p. 209.
- (in Polish) Janusz Umiński: Bydgoszcz. Przewodnik, Regionalny Oddział PTTK „Szlak Brdy” Bydgoszcz 1996
- Parucka, Krystyna (2008). Zabytki Bydgoszczy – minikatalog (in Polish). Bydgoszcz: „Tifen”. ISBN 8392719107.
