= List of hotels in Poland =

This is a list of major hotels in Poland broken down by city.

== Bydgoszcz ==
- Hotel "Bohema" in Bydgoszcz
- Hotel Brda in Bydgoszcz
- Hotel "Pod Orlem" in Bydgoszcz

== Katowice ==
- Altus Skyscraper
- Monopol Hotel

== Kraków ==
- Sheraton Grand Kraków

== Lublin ==
- Grand Hotel Lublinianka

== Łódź ==
- Andel's Hotel Łódź

== Sopot ==
- Grand Hotel

== Warsaw ==
- Hotel Bristol, Warsaw
- Centrum LIM
- Hotel Europejski
- InterContinental Warsaw
- Novotel Warszawa Centrum
- Hotel Polonia Palace
- Hotel Polski
- Branicki Residential House

== Wroclaw ==
- Monopol Hotel
- Sky Tower

== Other ==
- Czocha Castle
- Gola Dzierżoniowska Castle
- Książ
- Tuczno Castle
