= Hotel Bohema =

Hotel in Bydgoszcz, Poland

Hotel "Bohema"
- Polish: Hotel Bohema
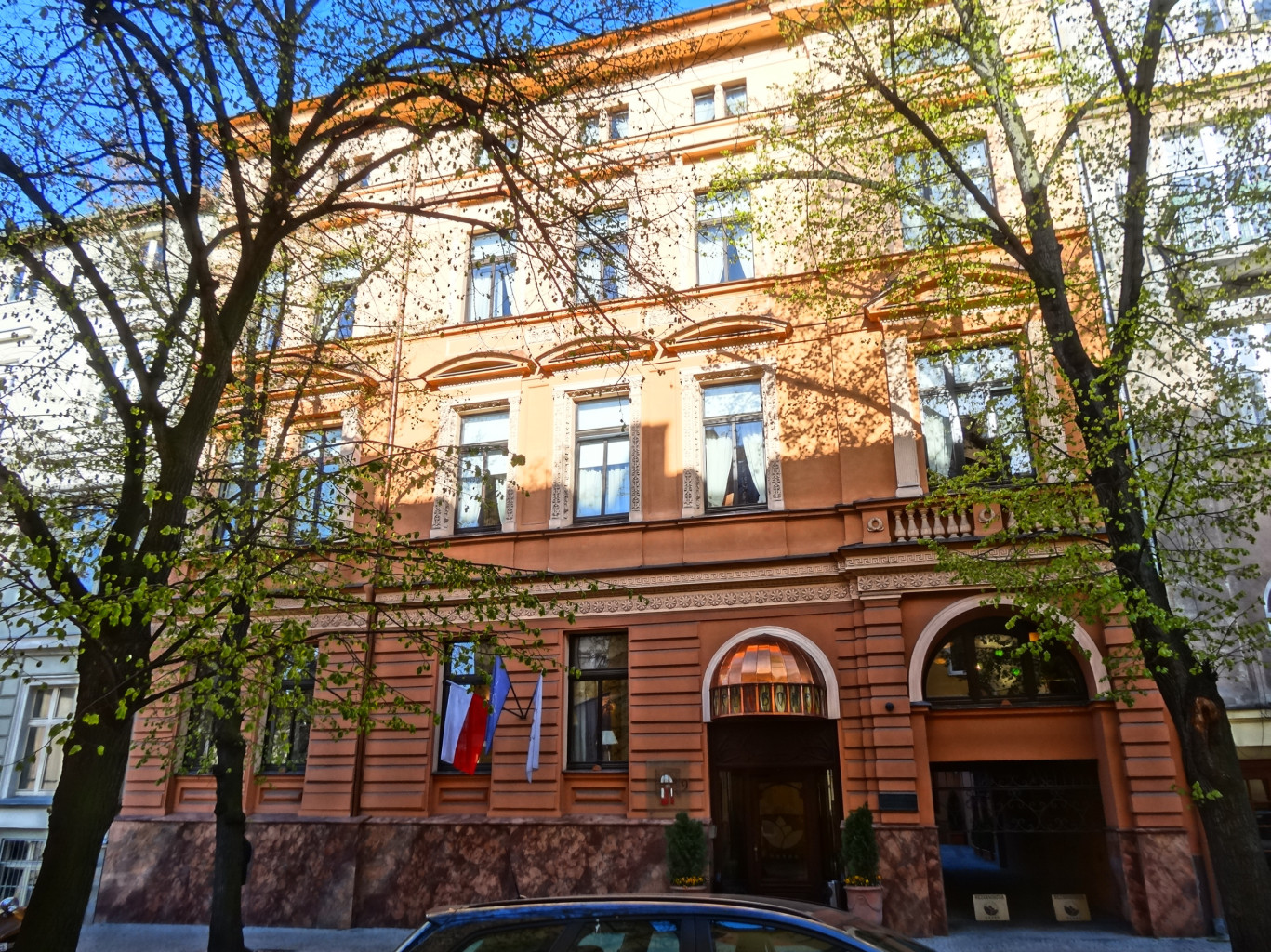
- Main façade of Hotel "Bohema"
- Interactive map of the Hotel "Bohema" area

General information
- Type: Hotel
- Architectural style: Eclectism
- Classification: Nr.722475, Reg.A/1385, 16 September 2008
- Location: Bydgoszcz, Poland, Poland
- Coordinates: 53°7′00″N 18°00′00″E
- Completed: 1877
- Client: Otto Bollmann
- Owner: Joanna and Janusz Franczak

Technical details
- Floor count: 5

Design and construction
- Architect: Anton Hoffmann

Website
- www.hotelbohema.pl/en/

The Hotel Bohema is a five-star hotel located at 9 Konarskiego Street, in downtown Bydgoszcz, Poland. The building is registered on the Kuyavian-Pomeranian Voivodeship Heritage List.

== Location ==
The building stands on the western side of Konarskiego Street in Bydgoszcz, near Piotra Skargi Street. The building is in the vicinity of the Park Casimir the Great, Plac Wolnosci and Fountain "Potop".

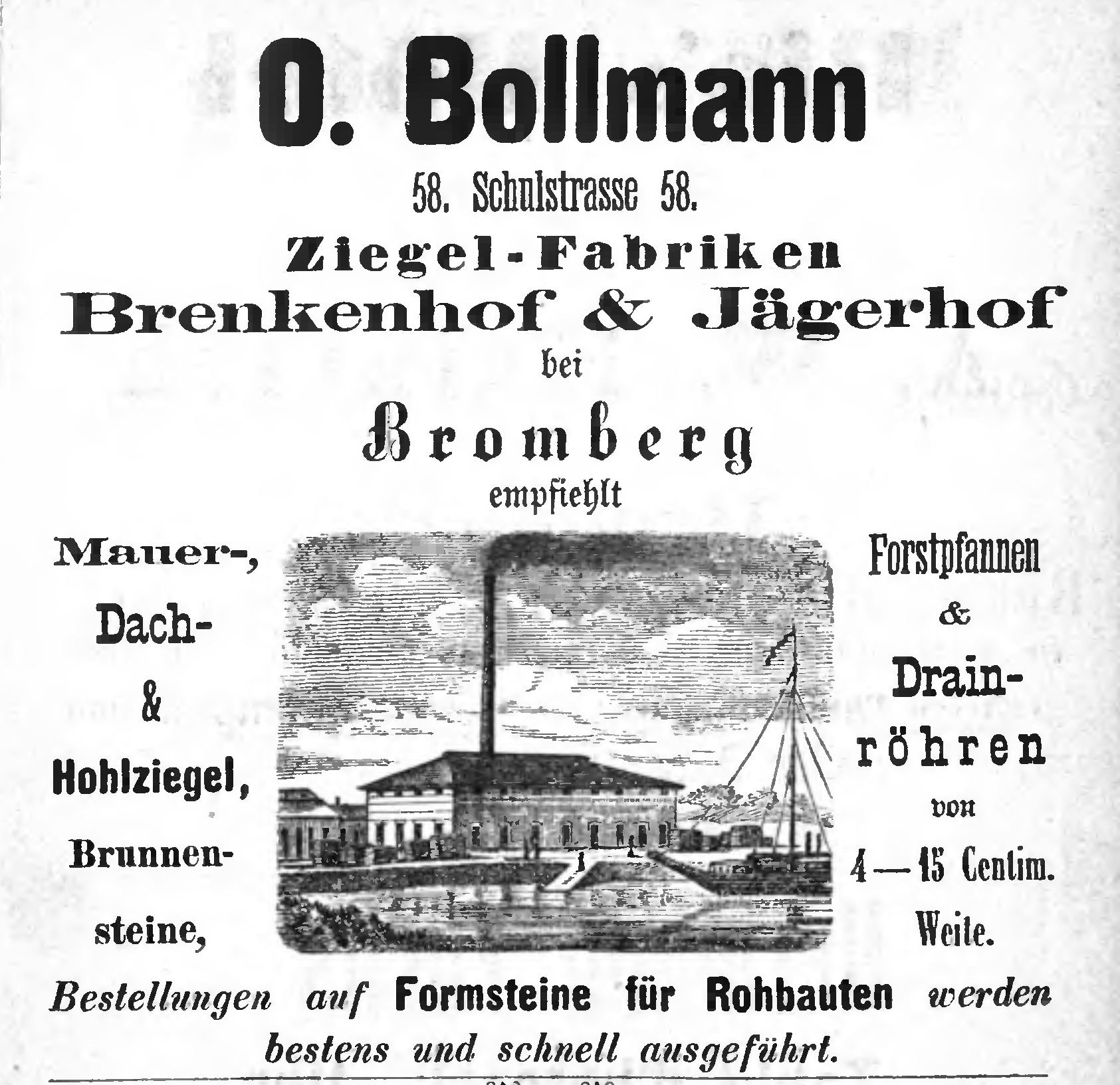
Advertising for Otto bollmann business, 1878

== History ==
The building was constructed in 1877 by master mason Anton Hoffmann, stepfather of Józef Święcicki, who is known for designing many townhouses in Bydgoszcz, in particular Hotel "Pod Orlem" and the buildings at 63 Gdanska street or at 1/3 Stary Port Street.

The first owner was a brick factory manager, Otto Bollmann, a German merchant who never lived in the house. The edifice was conceived as a tenement house with five apartments. Originally at Schule straße 3, tenants were senior officers, officials and artists, such as:

- Julius Bachmann, Lord Mayor of Bromberg in the 1880s,;
- Jerzy Rupniewski, famous 1920s-1950s Polish painter.

In 1920, the property passed into the hands of Magdalena Łaganowska who settled there and rented the other flats. During World War II, the tenement was taken over by German authorities, who accommodated there doctors who worked at the field hospital set up at 5 Konarskiego, now the building of the Catering School of Bydgoszcz.

After World War II, the tenement was managed by a communist estate agency, till the early 1990s. In 1997, it returned to private hands. Since December 2003, the new owners of the building rebuilt the interiors and opened in July 2008 the Hotel "Bohema". The Café and restaurant "Weranda" opened on 15 April 2007, and the restaurant "Black Diamond" on 22 March 2009.

== Architecture and characteristics ==
The hotel features eclectic style, standing out as a charm and rich bourgeois house from the Belle Époque period.

The facade on the street displays neo-Renaissance characteristics, in particular:

- a frieze and a rosette strip parting ground and first floor;
- two slight avant-corps, the right one -giving way to a passage to the backyard- is adorned on the first level by a figure inserted in the curved pediment;
- pilasters on the first floor entirely covered with motifs.

The building side giving onto the park comprises the "Weranda" restaurant, but also exposes in the background restored wooden balcony and loggia.

The hotel offers 24 rooms, a studio for families, apartments and suites.

Hotel "Bohema", since 2008, is the only five star hotel within Kuyavian-Pomeranian Voivodeship.

The building has been registered on the Kuyavian-Pomeranian Voivodeship Heritage List on 16 September 2008.

== Gallery ==
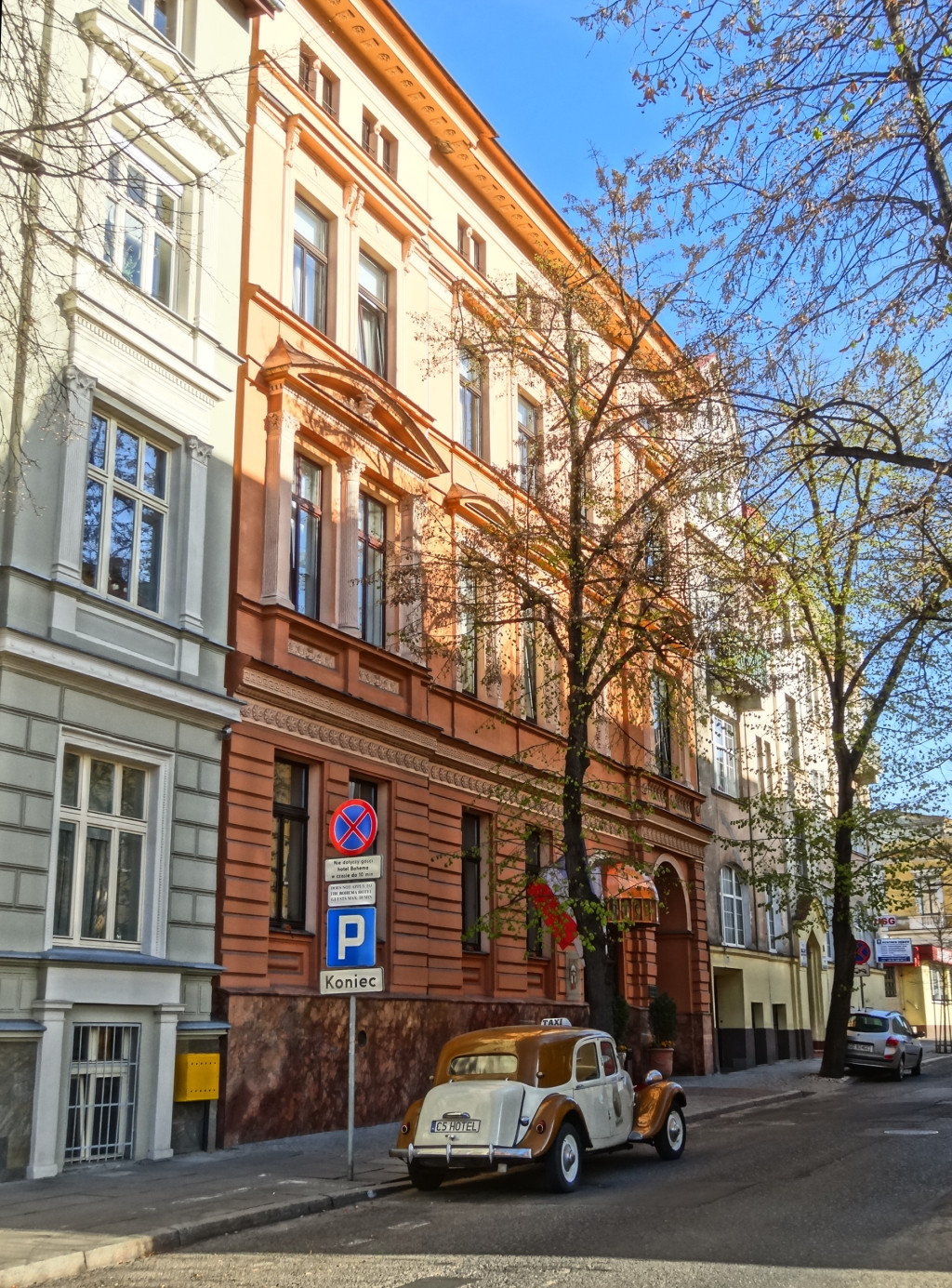
View from the street, with the ancient limousine parked at the front

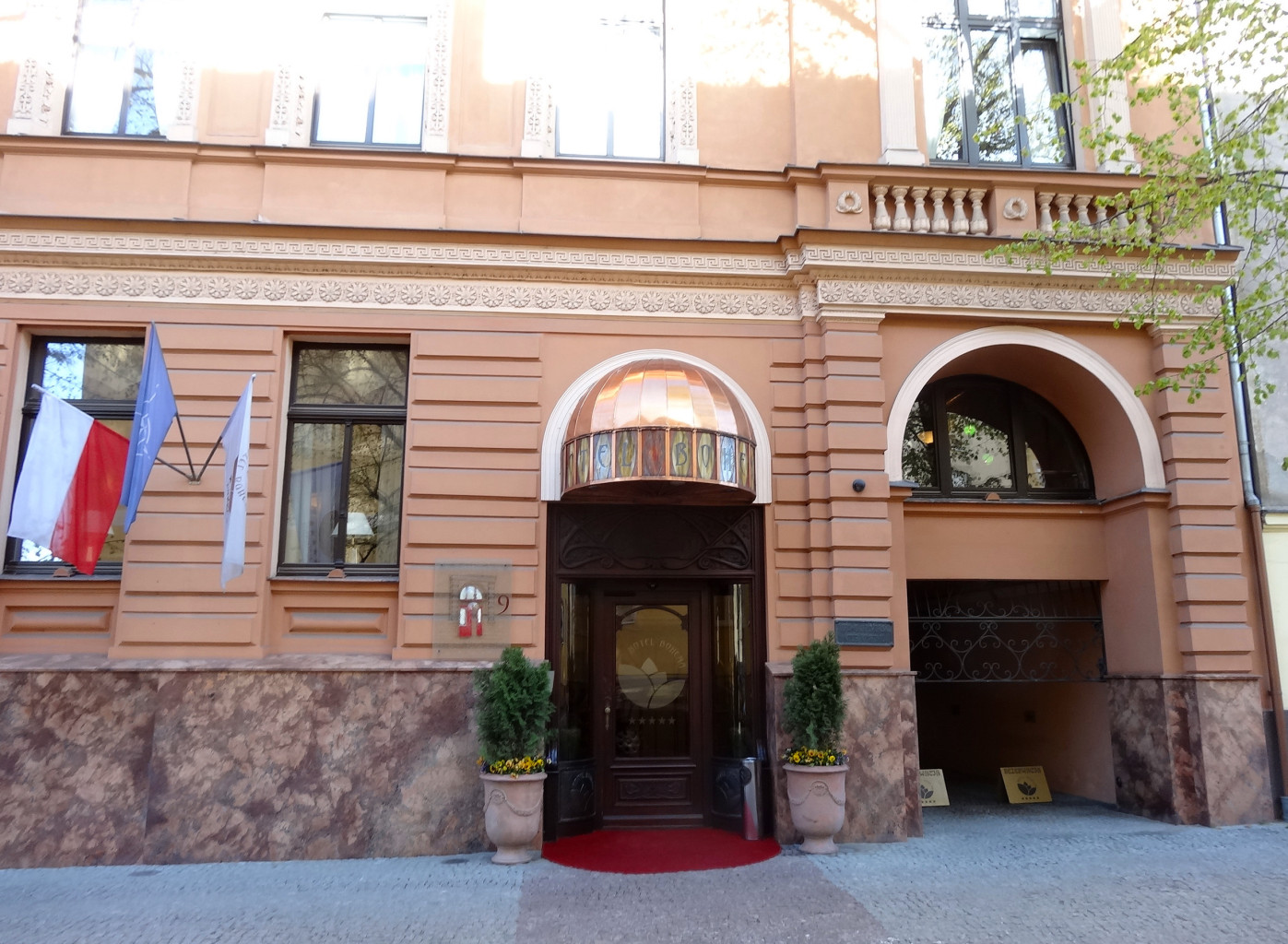
Main entries

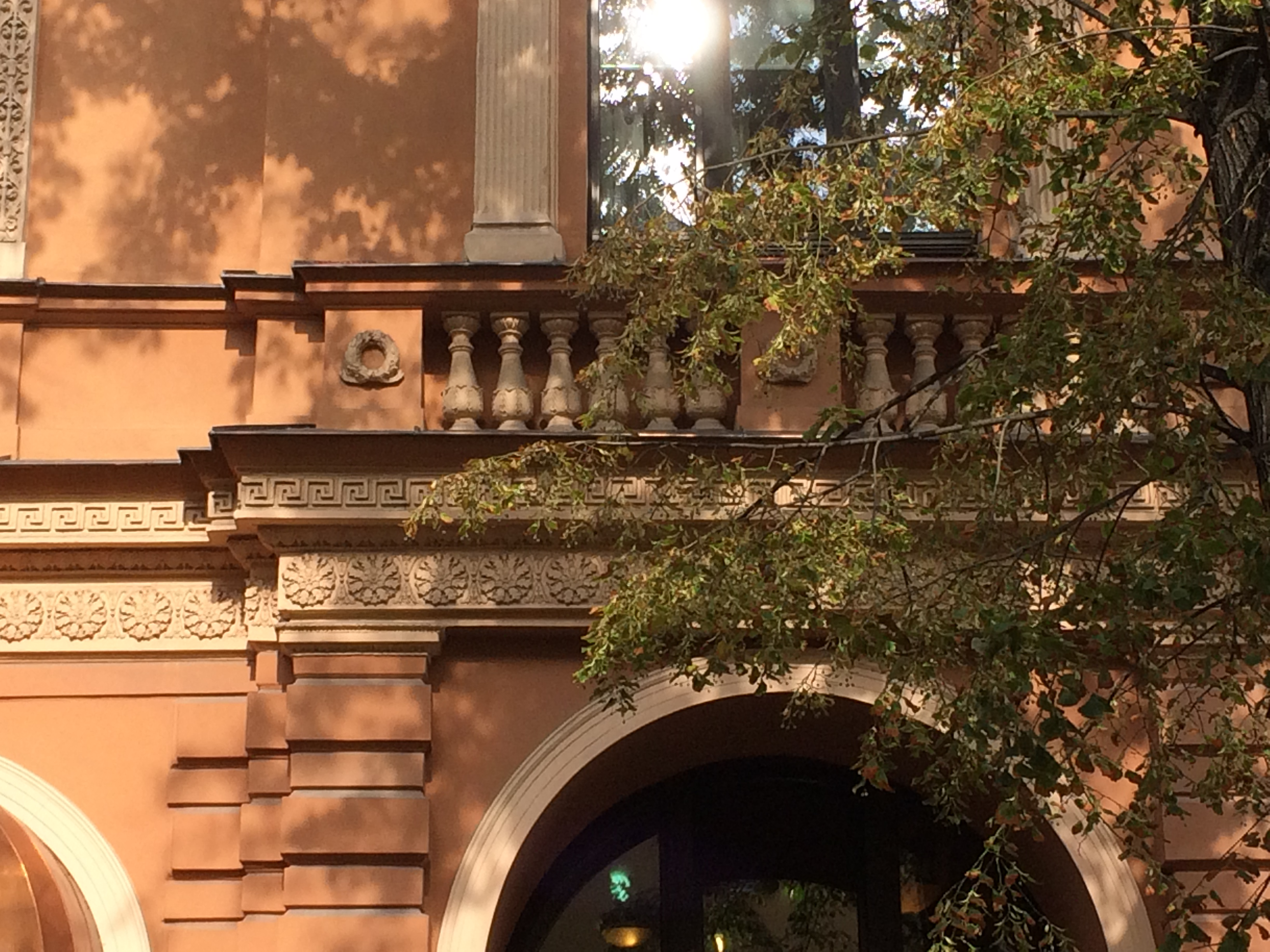
Frieze, rosette and balustrade

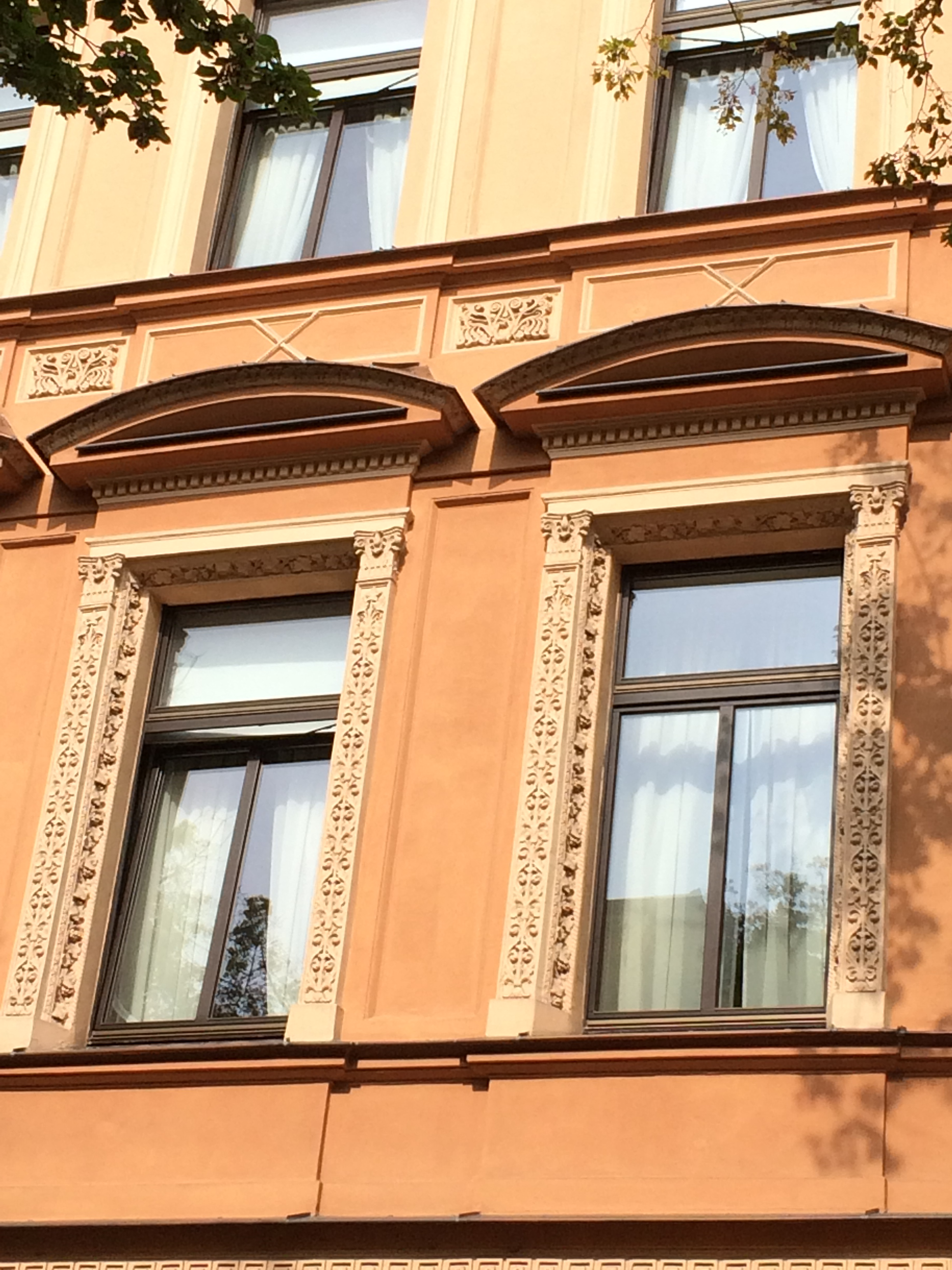
Street elevation with motifs

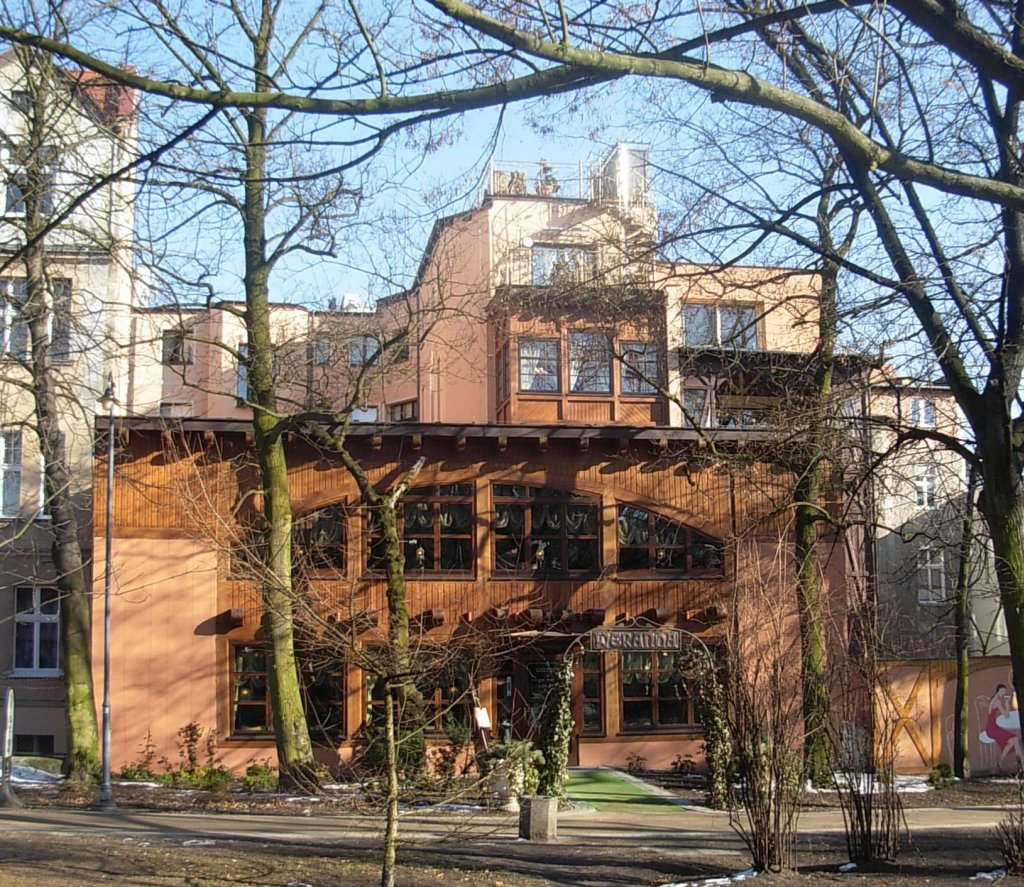
View from the park

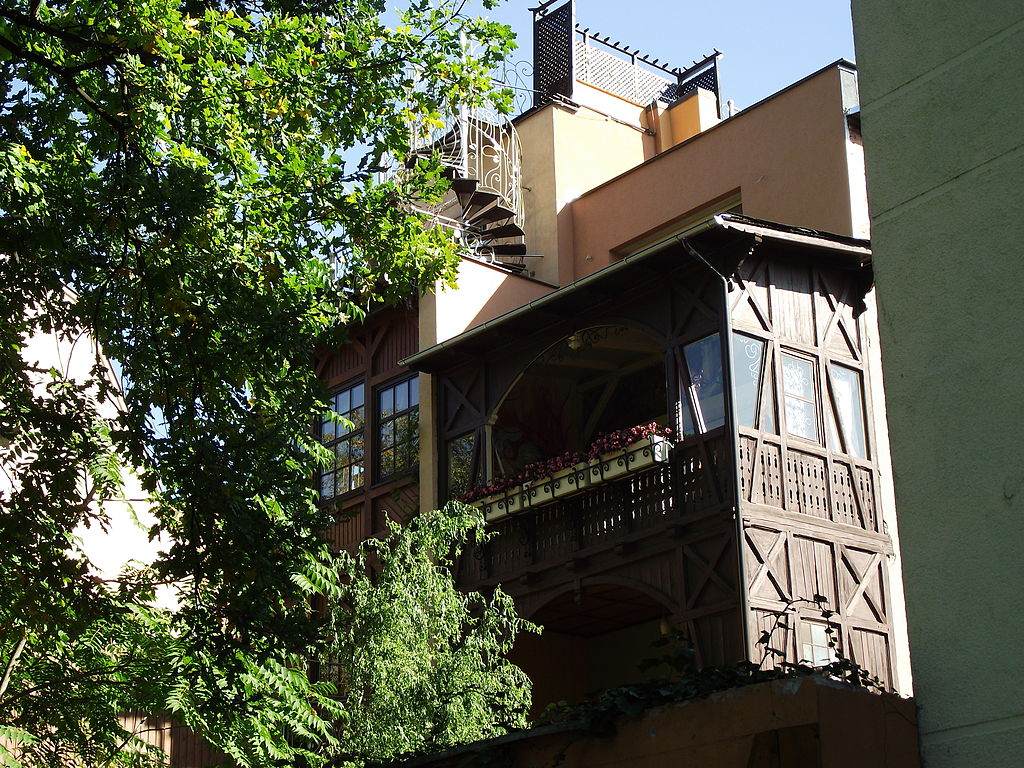
Wooden balcony and loggia onto the park

== See also ==
- List of hotels in Poland
- Bydgoszcz
- Piotra Skargi Street in Bydgoszcz
- Gdańska Street, Bydgoszcz
- Freedom Square, Bydgoszcz
- Jagiellońska street in Bydgoszcz
- Casimir the Great Park

== Bibliography ==
- (in Polish) Umiński, Janusz (1996). Bydgoszcz. Przewodnik. Bydgoszcz: Regionalny Oddział PTTK „Szlak Brdy”. ISBN 9788321725239.
- (in Polish) Parucka, Krystyna (2008). Zabytki Bydgoszczy – minikatalog. Bydgoszcz: "Tifen" Krystyna Parucka. ISBN 9788392719106.
- From Bunia to "Bohema", discussion between Joanna and Janusz Franczak with Irena Stürm-Delcroix, leaflet booklet published by the hotel.
