= Smolna Street, Warsaw =

Street in Warsaw

Coordinates: 52°13′58″N 21°01′23″E

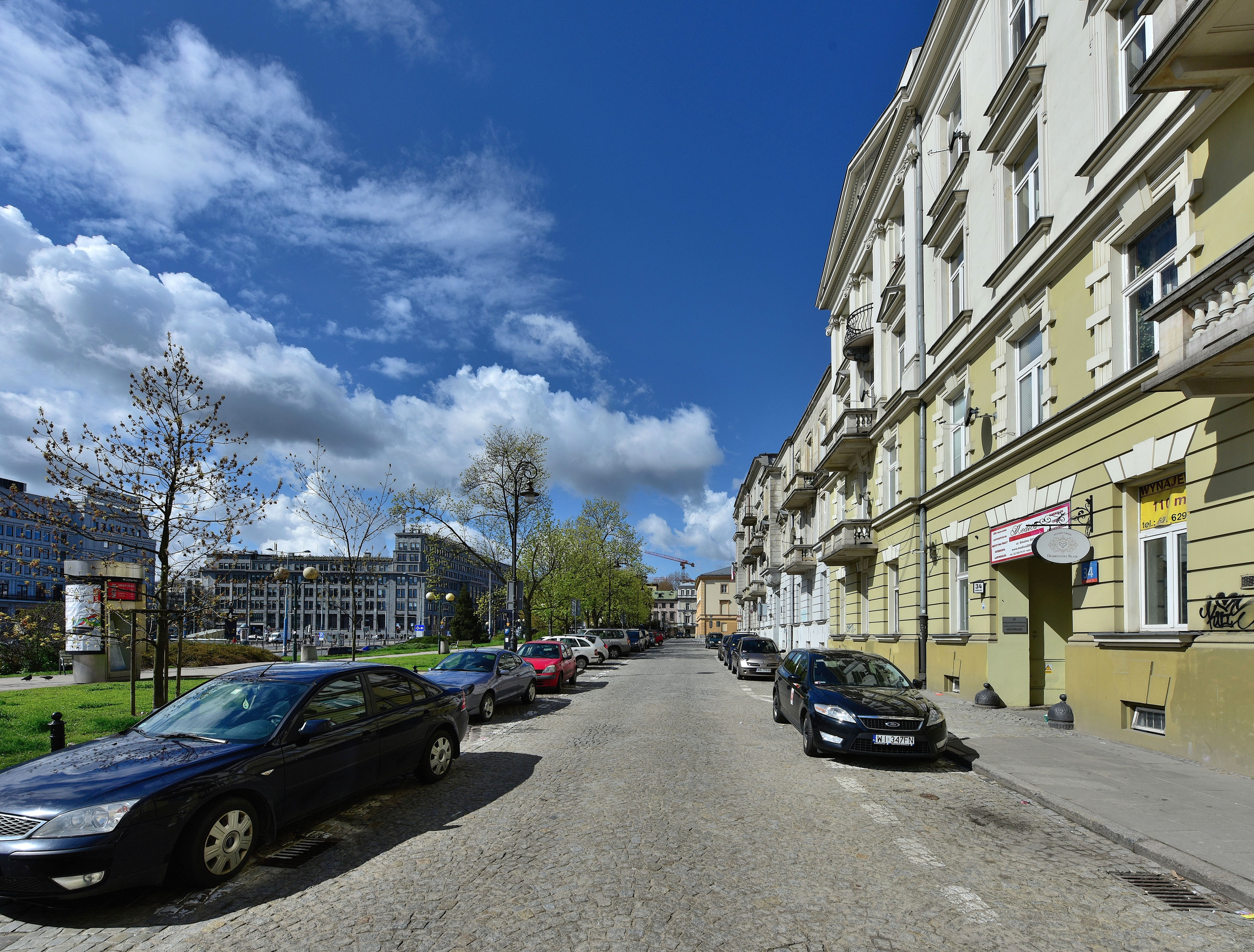
Smolna Street in Warsaw

Smolna (Polish: Ulica Smolna) is one of the streets of Warsaw's city centre. It is entirely contained in the Śródmieście district, and runs for approximately 400m, orthogonal to the Vistula river. It is a one-way street, running eastwards from Charles de Gaulle roundabout to Jerusalem Avenue, approximately 1 km west of the river.

== See also ==
- Branicki Residential House
