= IBB Grand Hotel Lublin =

Coordinates: 51°14′51″N 22°33′28″E

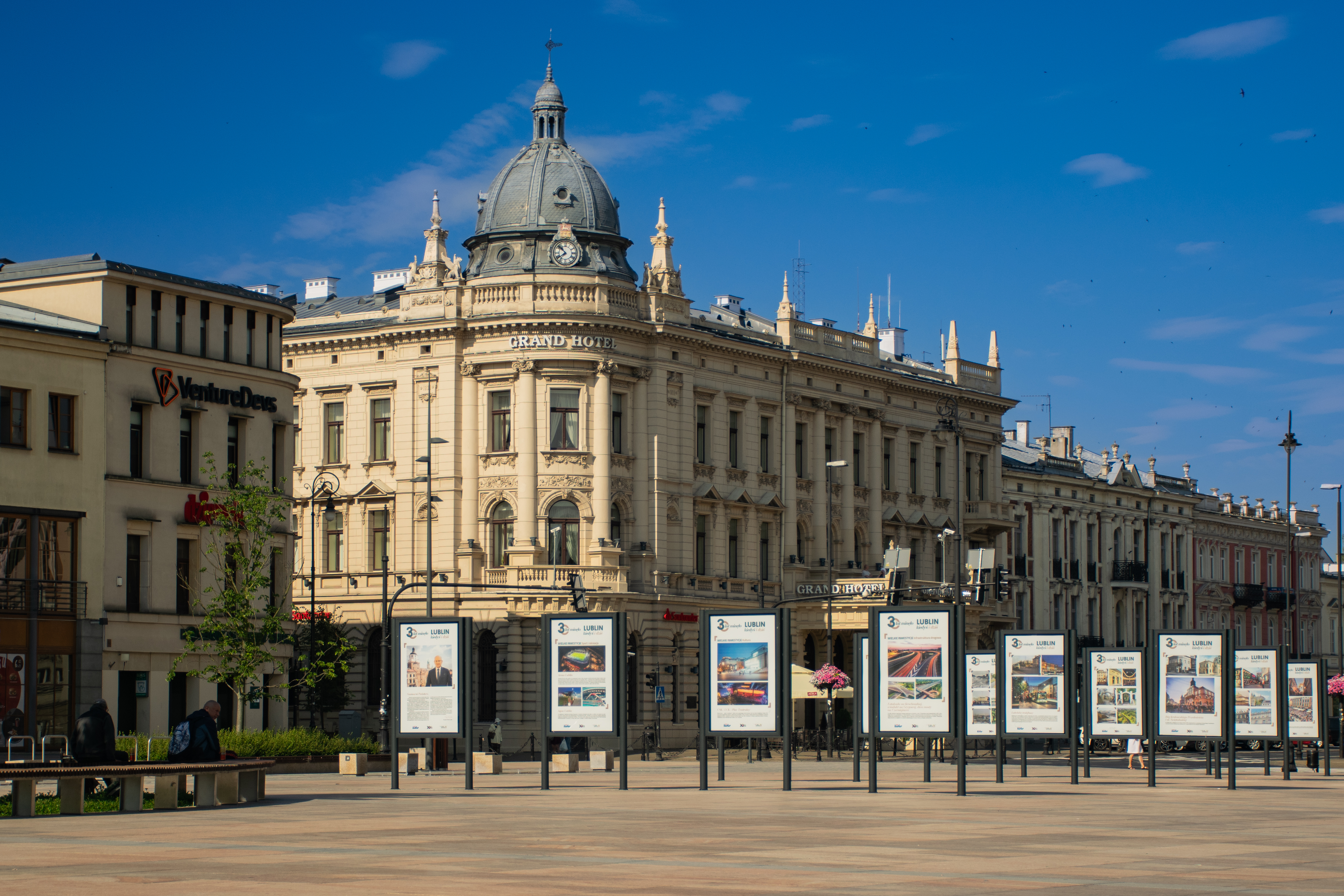
- View of the hotel from the Litewski Square
- Interactive map of the IBB Grand Hotel Lublin area

General information
- Type: hotel
- Architectural style: Eclecticism
- Location: ul. Krakowskie Przedmieście 56, Lublin, Poland
- Construction started: 1899
- Completed: 1900

Design and construction
- Architect: Gustaw Landau

Other information
- Number of rooms: 72

Website
- ibbhotellublin.com

The IBB Grand Hotel Lublin (formerly the Grand Hotel Lublinianka) historic is a four-star hotel in Lublin, Poland. The building was constructed between 1899 and 1900 and has served many purposes throughout its history.

== History ==
The building was constructed in the years 1899–1900, in just 17 months, for the Commercial Chamber of Lublin. It was designed by Gustaw Landau, an architect working in Warsaw and Łódź, and a brother of one of the co-owners of the Commercial Chamber. It became a popular venue for business negotiations as well as meals. In 1910, the building got the architectural shape which has been preserved until today. It was built in the eclectic style and features a Baroque dome, classicist colonnade and a Renaissance Revival attic.

In the period between the two world wars, there was a delicatessen shop and a coffee shop with breakfast rooms on the ground floor.

During World War II, the building was transformed into the Deutsches Haus because of its convenient location in the city centre. In the 1950s, it was changed into a low standard hotel with Lublinianka Cafe and a restaurant downstairs.

Lublin Grand Hotel, a company belonging to the Von der Heyden Group, bought the hotel in 2000 and thoroughly restored and modernized it, which led to its re-opening, as a 4-star deluxe hotel, in May 2002. It offers 72 rooms and apartments, restaurants, cafes, gym, sauna and conference halls. The hotel has been managed by IBB since 2003.

== See also ==
- List of hotels in Poland
