= Branicki Tenement =

Coordinates: 52.232611°N 21.021194°E

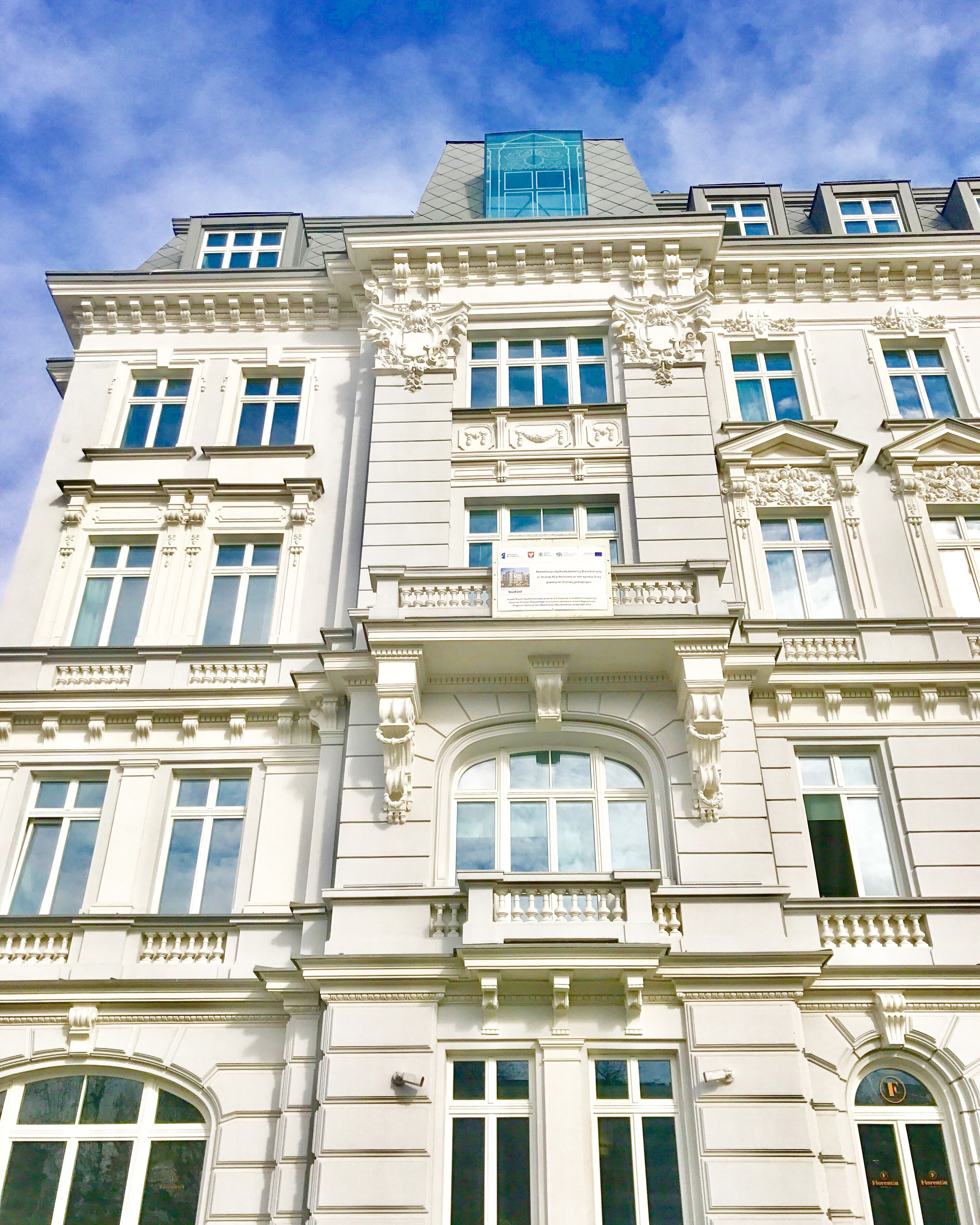
- Interactive map of the Branicki Tenement area

General information
- Location: Warsaw, Poland, ul. Smolna 40
- Opening: 1903
- Management: InterContinental Hotels Group

Design and construction
- Architect: Władysław Marconi

Website
- indigowarsaw.com/pl/

The Branicki Tenement is an eclectic-style historic building dating back to 1903, located on Smolna Street in Warsaw, Poland. It currently houses a four-star boutique Hotel Indigo Warsaw, a brand of InterContinental Hotels Group.

== History ==
It originally functioned as a residence, within a block of tenement houses numbering from 30 to 38. The owner of the building at that time - Count Ksawery Branicki - initiated the division of the Branicki Palace Gardens in hopes of creating a representative urban development. The building is situated in Warsaw’s most charming and picturesque neighborhood, in proximity to Nowy Świat Street, Royal Route and Three Crosses Square.

The design of the building was assigned to valued architect Bronisław Brochowicz-Rogoyski, who also developed an attractive array of tenement houses on Foksal street, the main building of the Warsaw University of Technology, and the first high-rise construction in Warsaw - the "PAST" building.

In 1944 the building was bombed by German forces and robbed. After WWII the building was reconstructed, based on preserved plans and photographs, however it was no longer owned by the Branicki family. Since October 1945 the entire property, pursuant to Bierut Decree, along with the impressive family fortune, was nationalized. For a short period of time, the office of the First Secretary of PZPR Bolesław Bierut was located here. From the 1970s until the reclaiming of the building by the Count Branicki's heirs, it served as headquarter of the Union of Socialist Polish Youth (ZSMP).

Smolna 40 is under the protective care of the Warsaw Conservatory Office. Since 2014, it has been owned by Budizol Property.

In May 2017 the building reopened as the four-star boutique hotel under international brand Hotel Indigo.

== See also ==
- Architecture of Warsaw
- Hotel Bristol, Warsaw
- List of hotels in Poland
