= Sheraton Grand Kraków =

Hotel in Kraków, Poland

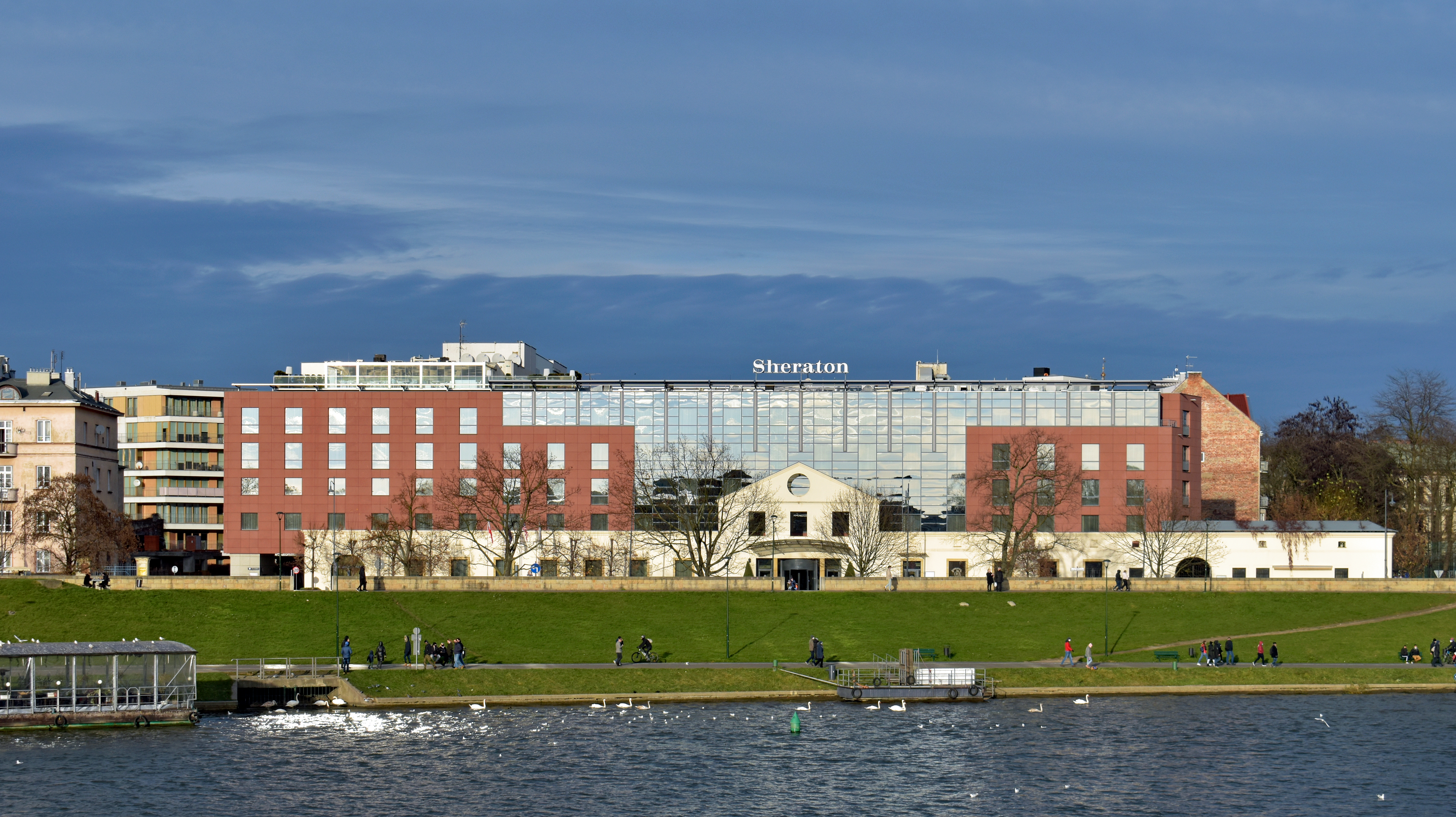
- View from the Dębnicki Bridge

- Location within Poland

General information
- Location: Kraków, Poland, 7 Powiśle Street, Krakow, 31-101
- Coordinates: 50.055939°N 19.9286874°E

Website
- sheratongrandkrakow.co.pl

Sheraton Grand Kraków is a five-star hotel in Kraków, Poland at 7 Powiśle Street. The hotel is located on the Wisla River bank, near the famous Wawel Castle, close to the Market Square at the Old Town.

It was built on the site of the demolished, historically significant Royal Brewery, which was surrounded by scandal. The hotel building was the winner of the 2004 Archi-Szopa poll for the worst new architectural structure in Krakow, and was designed by a Belgian design firm.

== Restaurants and bars ==
- The Olive Restaurant
- Qube Vodka Bar & Café
- SomePlace Else
- Roof Top Terrace & Lounge Bar

== See also ==
- List of hotels in Poland
