= Stary Port Street, Bydgoszcz =

Street in Bydgoszcz, Poland

Coordinates: 53.1229°N 18.0042°E

Stary Port Street
Bydgoszcz
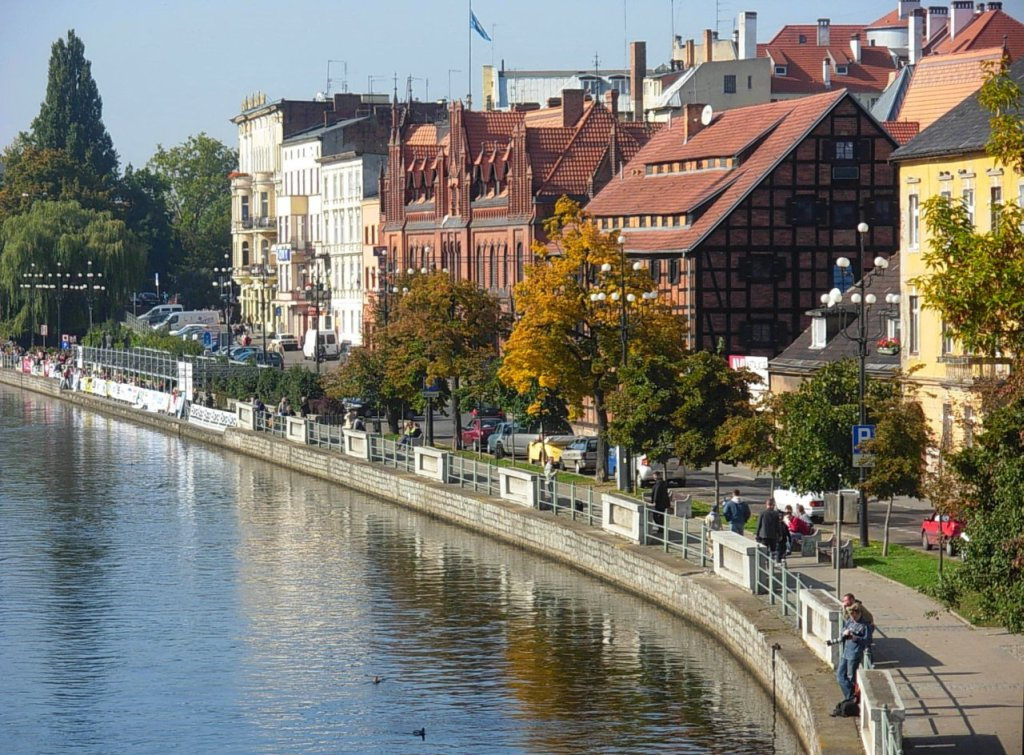
- View of the street from Brda river

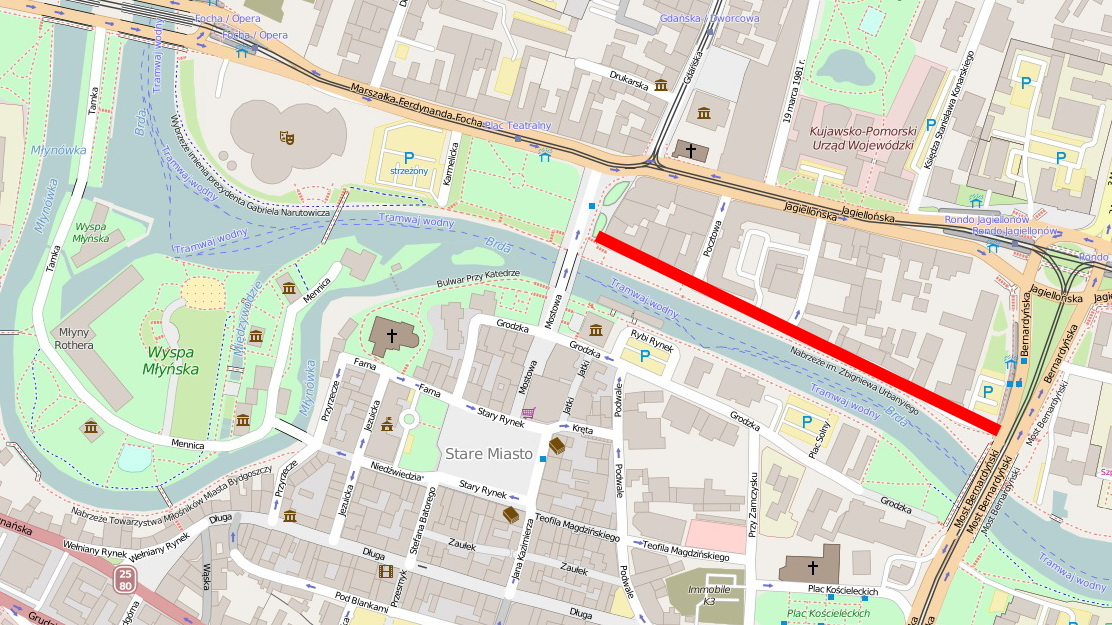
- Location of Stary Port Street in Bydgoszcz
- Native name: Ulica Stary Port w Bydgoszczy (Polish)
- Former names: Kasernenstrasse, Hermann Franke, Wyzwolenia, Julian Marchlewski
- Part of: Bydgoszcz downtown district
- Namesake: Old Harbour
- Owner: City of Bydgoszcz
- Length: 500 m (1,600 ft)
- Location: Bydgoszcz, Poland

Stary port Street ("Old harbour street") is located in Bydgoszcz Old Town, Poland, along the northern bank of Brda river. It bears several buildings registered on the Kuyavian-Pomeranian Voivodeship Heritage List.

== Location ==
Street stretches along the Brda river from the intersection with Bernardyńska street to Theatre square. On its way, the following streets intersect it from the north:

- Franciszek Ksawery Drucki-Lubecki street;
- Pocztowa street.

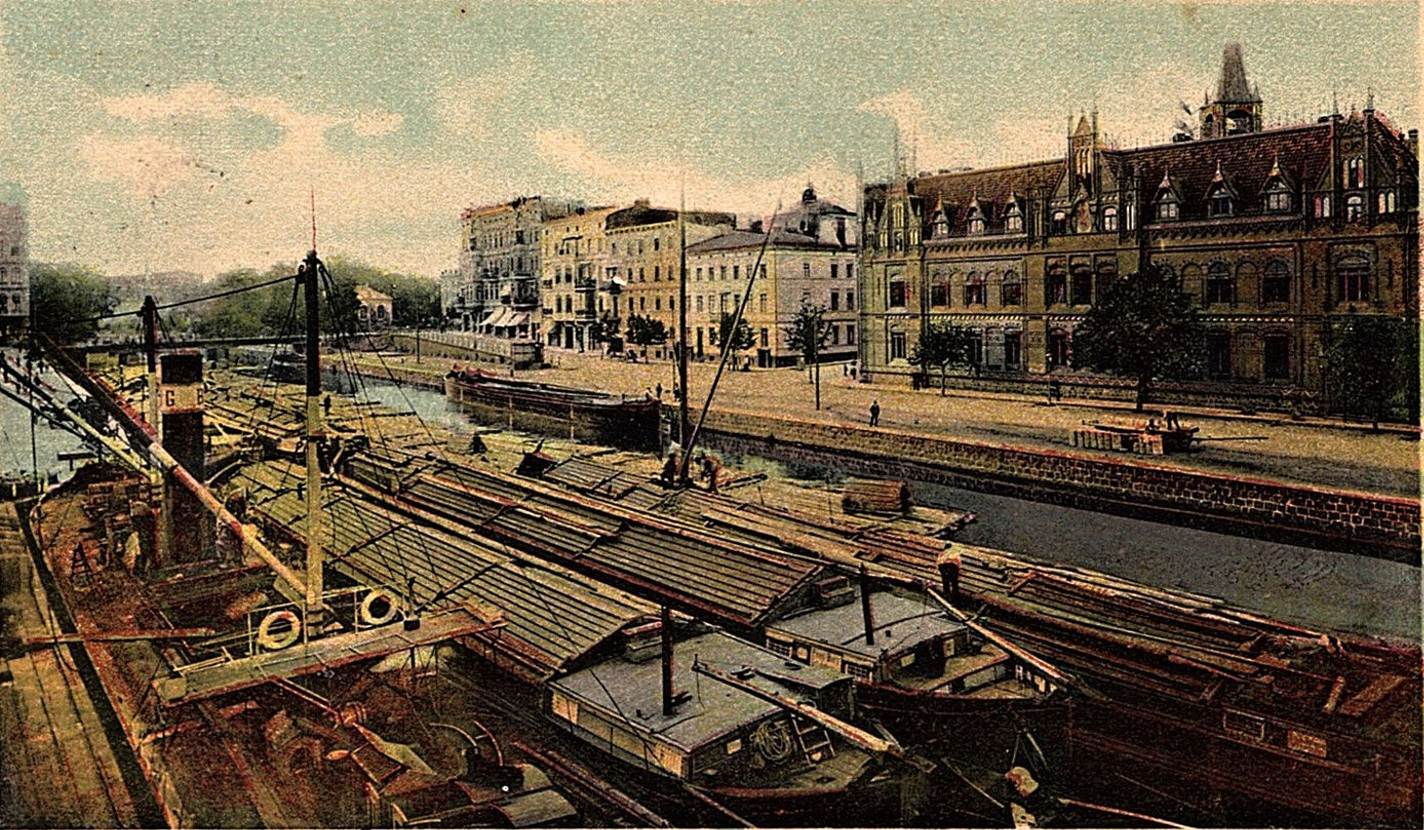
Kasernenstrasse 1899

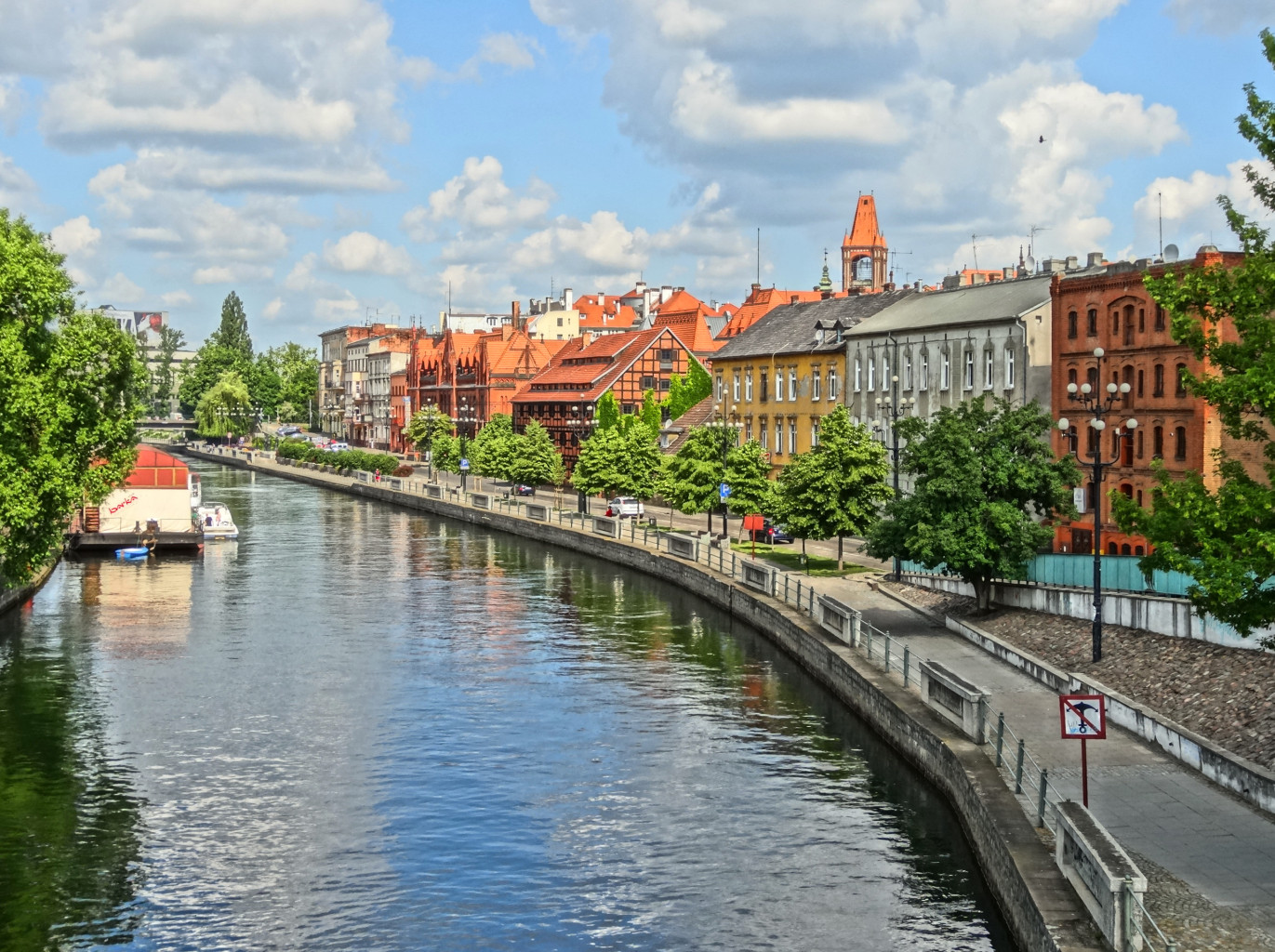
View from the river to the west

The renovated walkway following the Brda river has been given in 2009 the name of Boulevard Zbigniew Urban ((in Polish) "Bulwar Zbigniewa Urbanyiego").

== History ==
The street was founded with as the trail along the old road leading to the old harbour. The road already existed in the Old Polish period (before the 16th century). The river banks were used for storing stored goods and timber rafting. Earliest written mention of the street can be found on a detailed plan drawn by the Prussian geometer Gretha in 1774, where is noticed a row of granaries along its path. In the late 18th century, was built at the place of today's Main Post Office a complex of barracks for the Prussian garrison: hence the name "Kasernenstrasse". On a city map from 1809 appears a complex of buildings in the northern part of the street, with some gardens and farm fields towards Grodztwo.

In the middle of the 19th century, newly built granaries and few other buildings were standing in the street. More buildings appeared in the end of this century:

- The main Post office building complex (1883–1885);
- Tenements in the corner with Theatre Square (1894).

In addition, a wide wharf was used for loading and unloading goods from barges plying on the waterways between Vistula and Oder.

The street frontage did not evolve much through the beginning of 20th century and World War II.

In 1976–1978 and 1986–1987, Brda river waterfront has been renovated and upgraded, setting up a walkway and recreation areas.

In 1989, in front of N°9, has been unveiled a sculpture, "The three Graces ((in Polish) Trzy Gracje ). This work, realized by Jerzy Buczkowski, displays a bronze casting of three women, the Graces, who, according to Greek mythology were goddesses of charm, beauty, nature, human creativity, and fertility. The "Three Graces" are considered one of the most successful examples of modern sculpture in Bydgoszcz. The setting emphasizes the area as the most representative renovated section of the Brda riverbanks in Bydgoszcz.

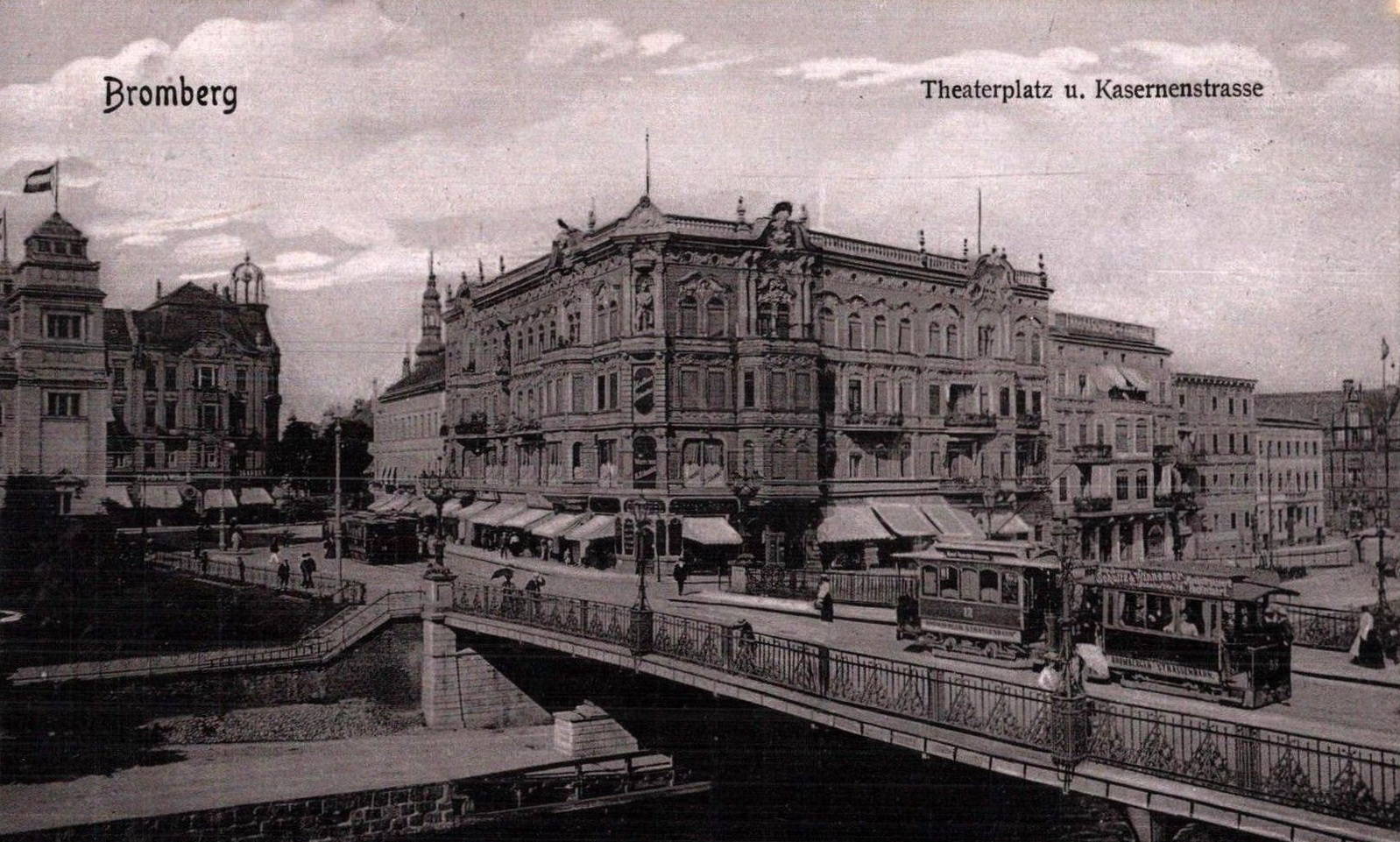
Kasern strasse 1905 Bydgoszcz

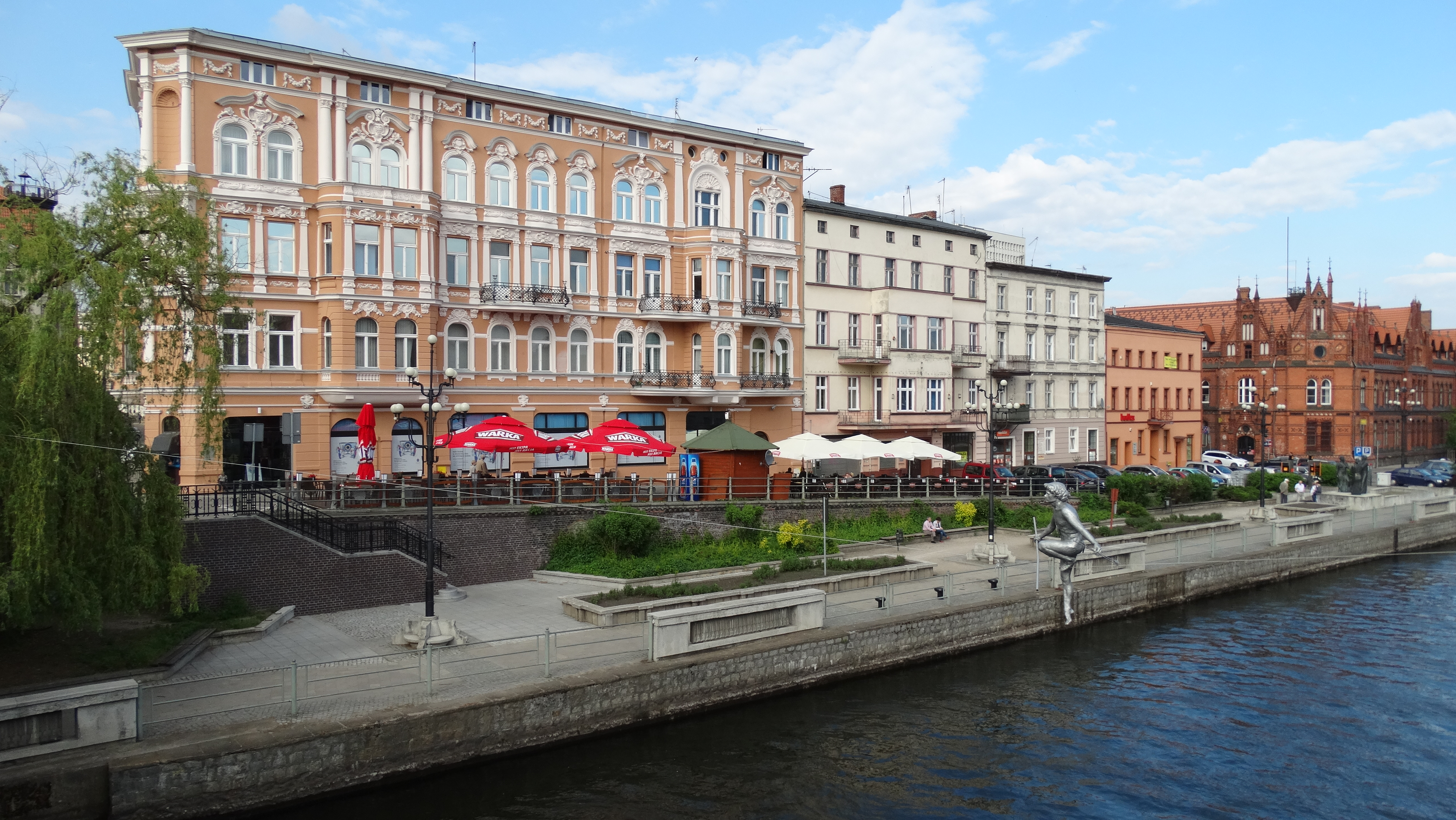
Elevations on Stary Port seen from Brda bridge

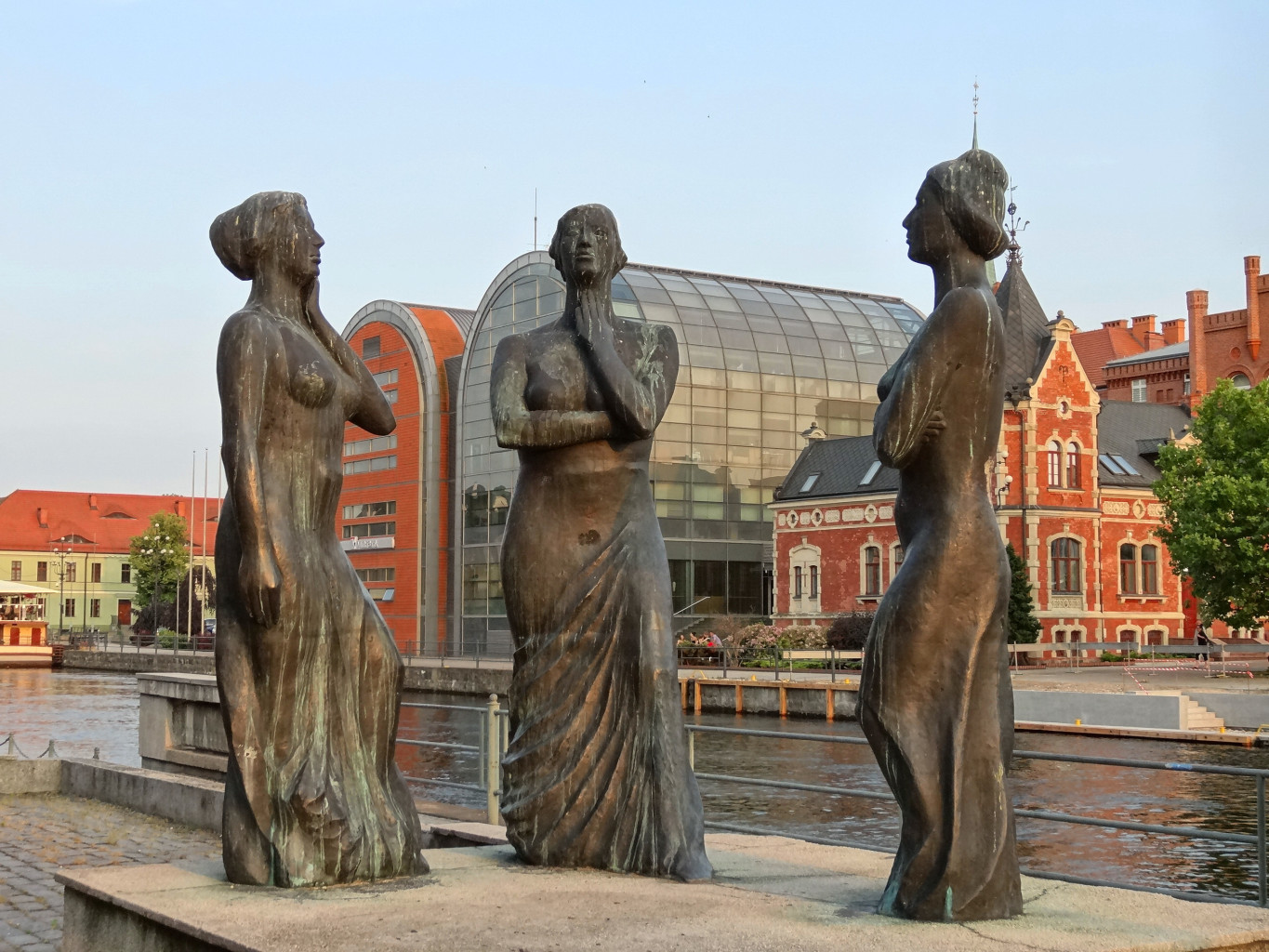
The "Three Graces"

=== Naming ===
The street had the following names through its existence:

- 1855–1909, Kasernenstrasse, due to the presence of Prussian barracks;
- 1909–1920, Hermann Frankestrasse, from Hermann Franke, an industrialist, honorary Citizen of the City of Bromberg;
- 1920–1939, Ulica Hermana Frankego;
- 1939–1945, Hermann Frankestrasse;
- 1945–1956, Ulica Wyzwolenia (Liberation street);
- 1956–1990, Ulica Juliana Marchlewskiego;
- From 1990, Ulica Stary Port (Old Harbour).

== Architecture ==
Frontages of Stary Port street belong to buildings erected in the second half of the 19th century, such as half-timbered granaries, and two larger edifices:

- Post office buildings;
- Polish National Bank building.

Currently, the street is part of "Zbigniew Urban Boulevard", namesake for Bydgoszcz water way. This area of the city is closely associated with Brda river, with highlighted sights such as:

- Lloyd palace;
- Granaries;
- mBank office building aka "new granaries";
- the Main Post Office.

Reflections of facades in the water of the river are part of Bydgoszcz typical scenery.

== Main places and buildings ==
=== Tenements at N°1 & 3, corner with Theatre Square 2. ===
Kuyavian-Pomeranian Heritage list N°601409-Reg.A/1141 (May 6, 1992).

1893–1905 by Józef Święcicki

Neo-Baroque

These houses have been built by Bromberg's architect Joseph Święcicki in 1893 for the heirs of Julius Rosenthal, a businessman. Originally, it was planned to house a Department store and an apartment. The building was completed in 1894. In 1910, the northern end was razed to build a more modern Department store designed by Fritz Weidner. In the 1930s, gables were demolished and decoration moved on the top of the cornice, getting rid of statuesque decorations. In 2011, a thorough refurbishing has been performed on the facade, exposing its initial splendor.

Building elevations display on both sides a lavish Neo-Baroque décor, trademark of Józef Święcicki. They recall his famous realization on Gdanska street. Architectural features include, among others:

- Bay-windows stretching on several levels and topped by terraces, flanked by columns;
- Wrought iron balconies;
- Prolific decoration elements, including a Hermes staff above a balcony.
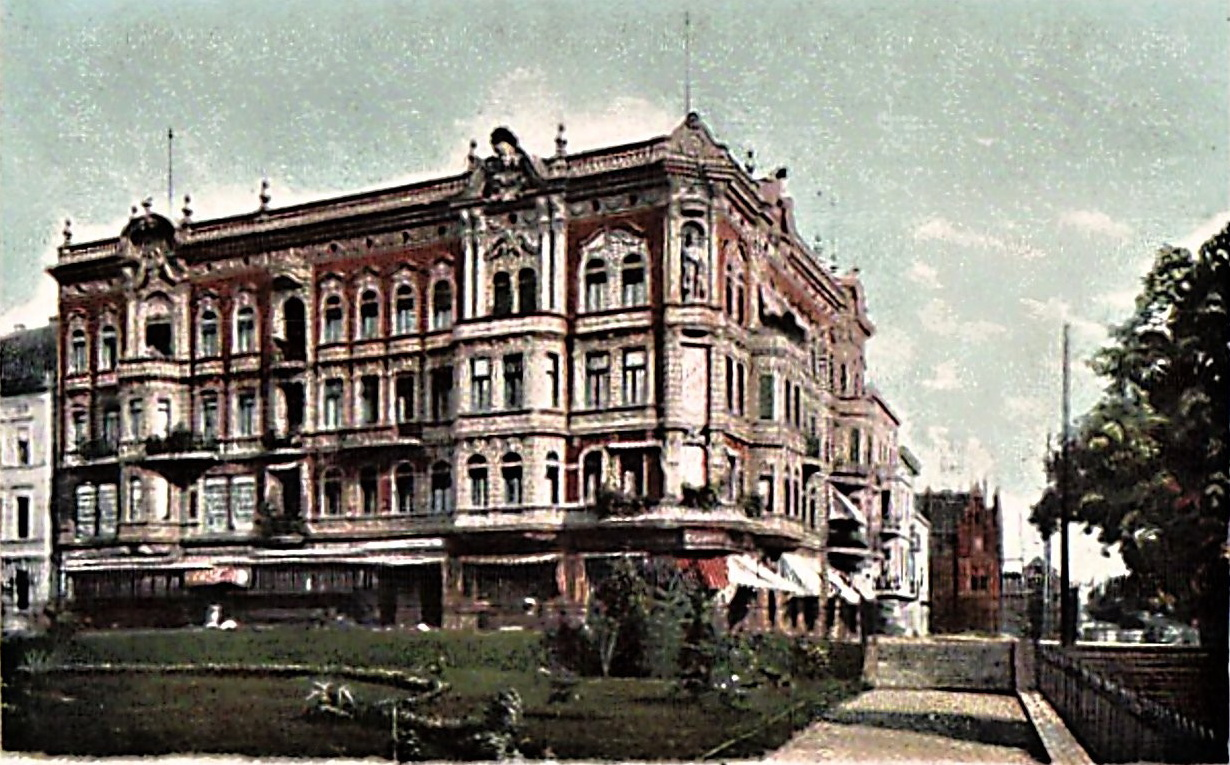
Building in 1910 with its original gables

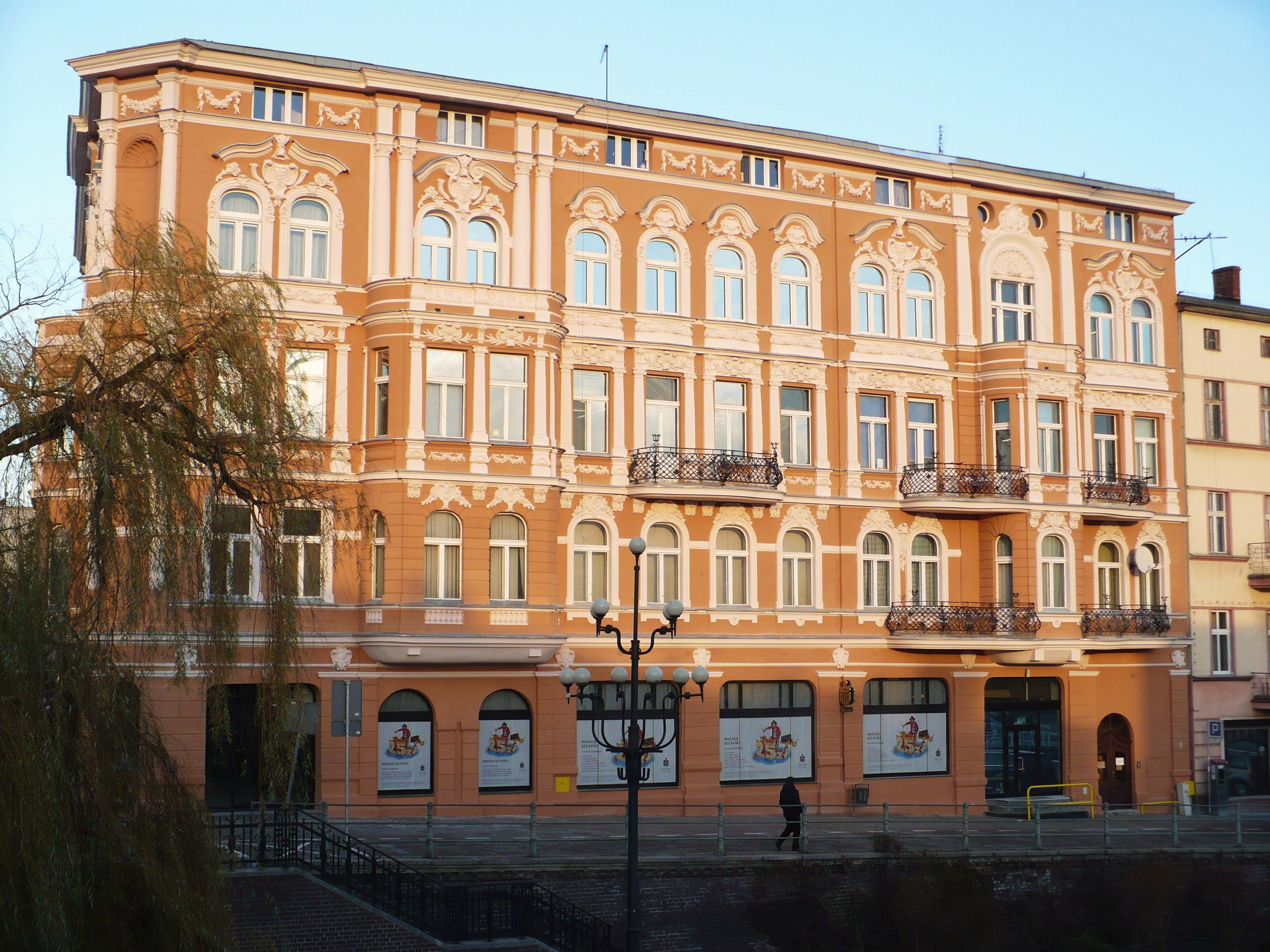
Frontage on the river

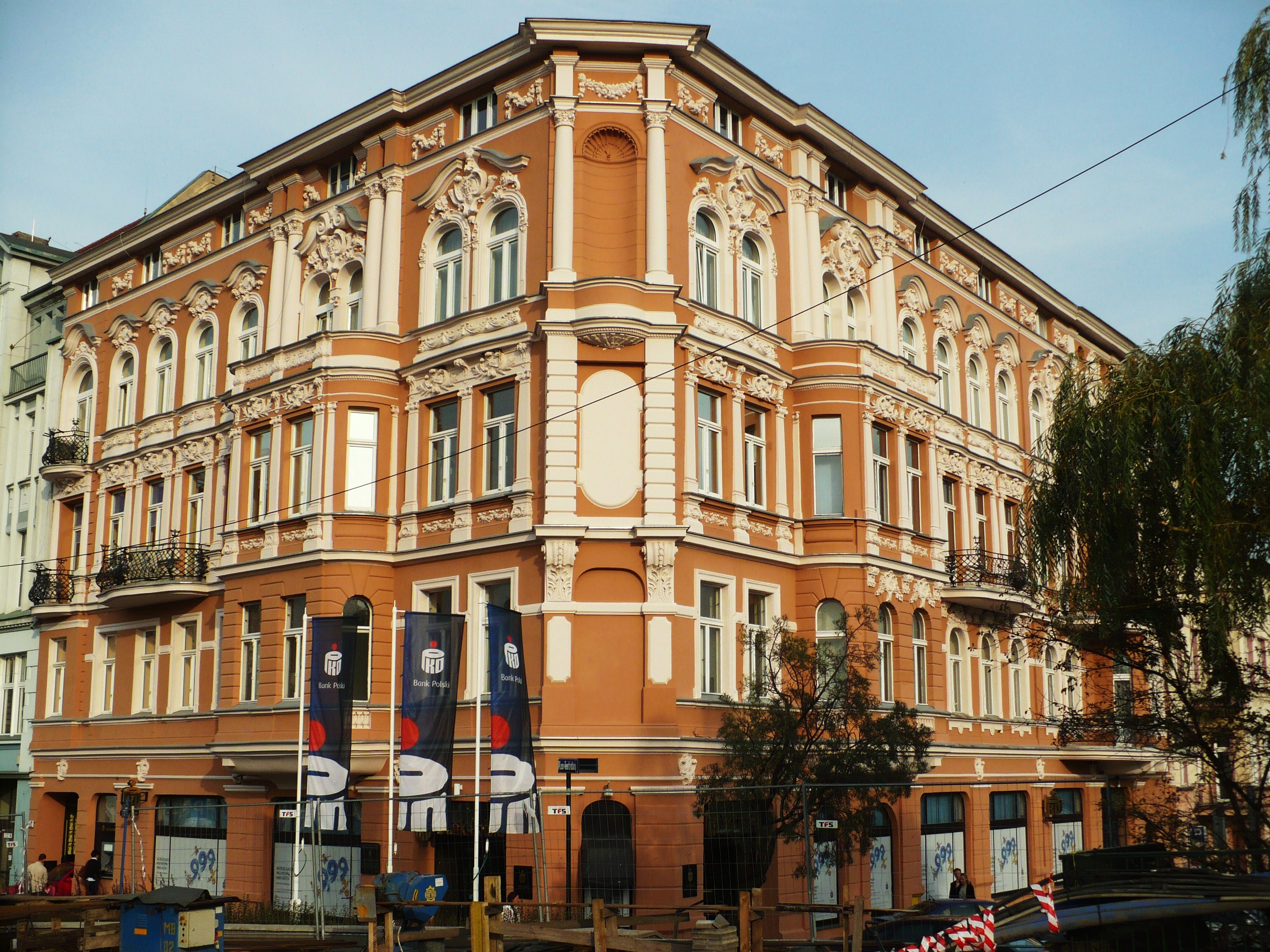
Corner elevation

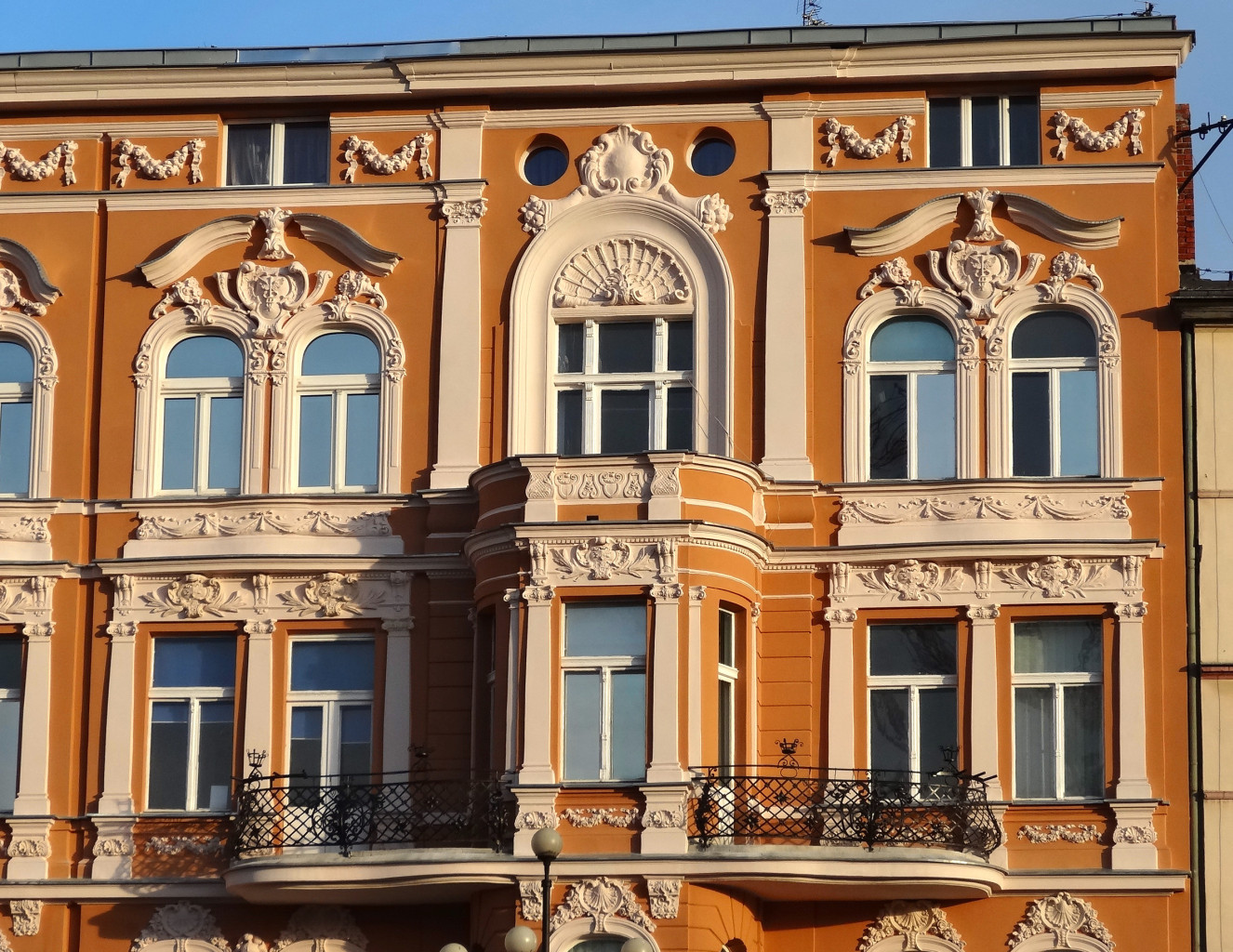
Bay-window

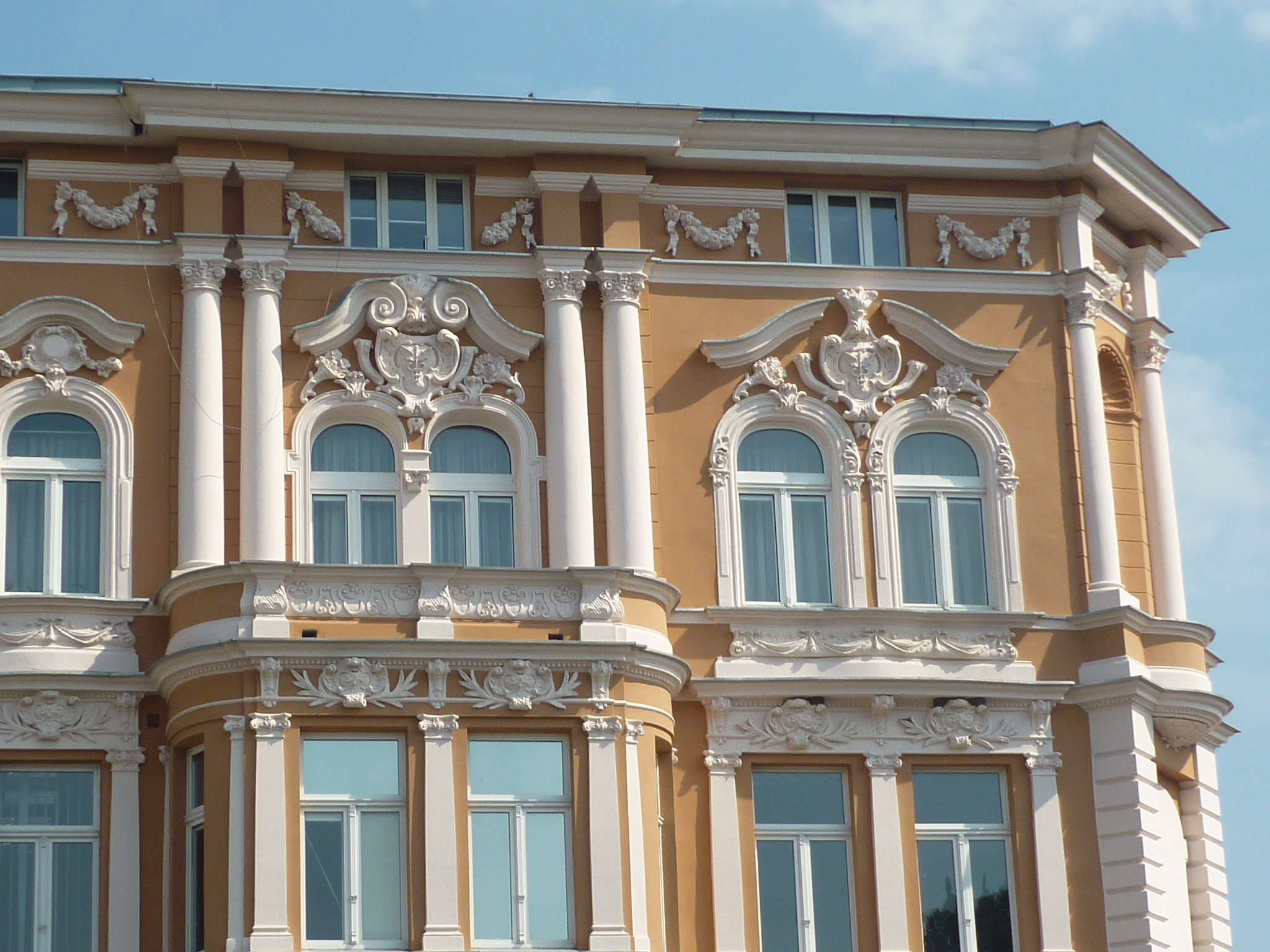
Bay-window topped by a Hermes staff

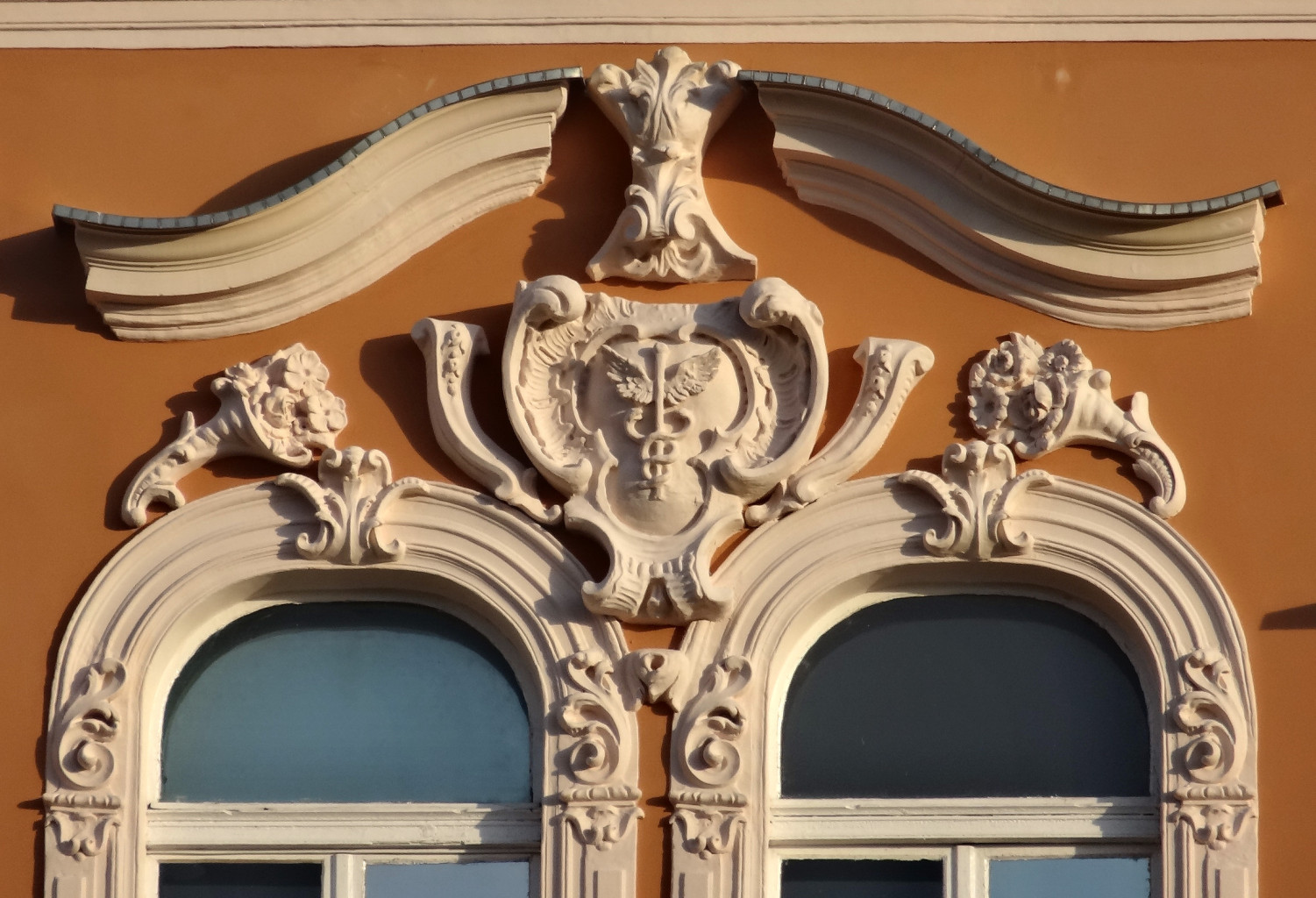
Detail of the Caduceus

=== Post office building, at N°11 ===
Kuyavian-Pomeranian Heritage list N°601347-Reg.A/749 (December 15, 1971).

1883–1899

Neo-Gothic

The building housed the high directorate for post offices and the customs office in the late 19th century (Prussian era). Today, it is still the seat of the Bydgoszcz Post Office. The building was built in two phases: the edifice on Stary Port street dates back to 1883–1885, the one on Jagiellońska street to the years 1896–1899.

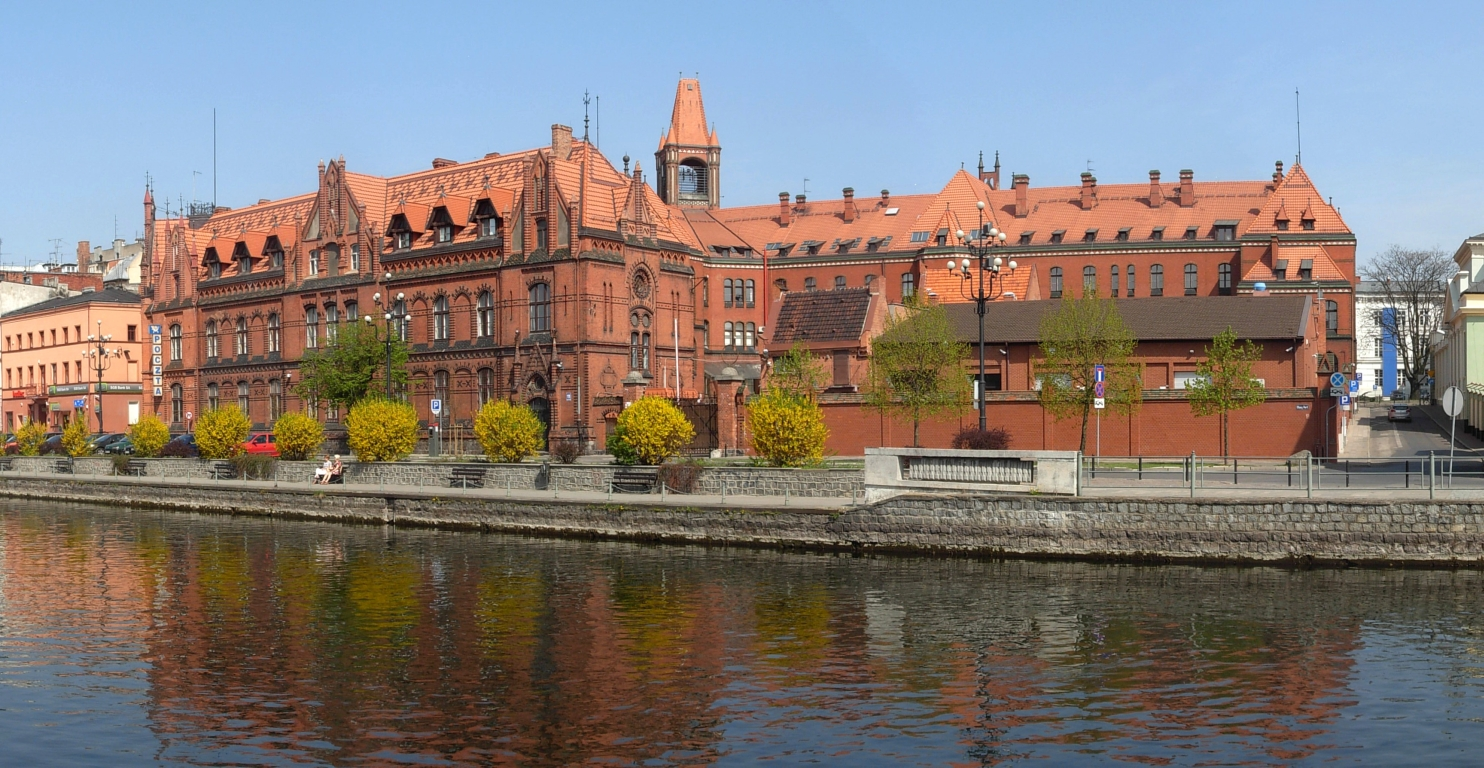
Frontage on Stary Port

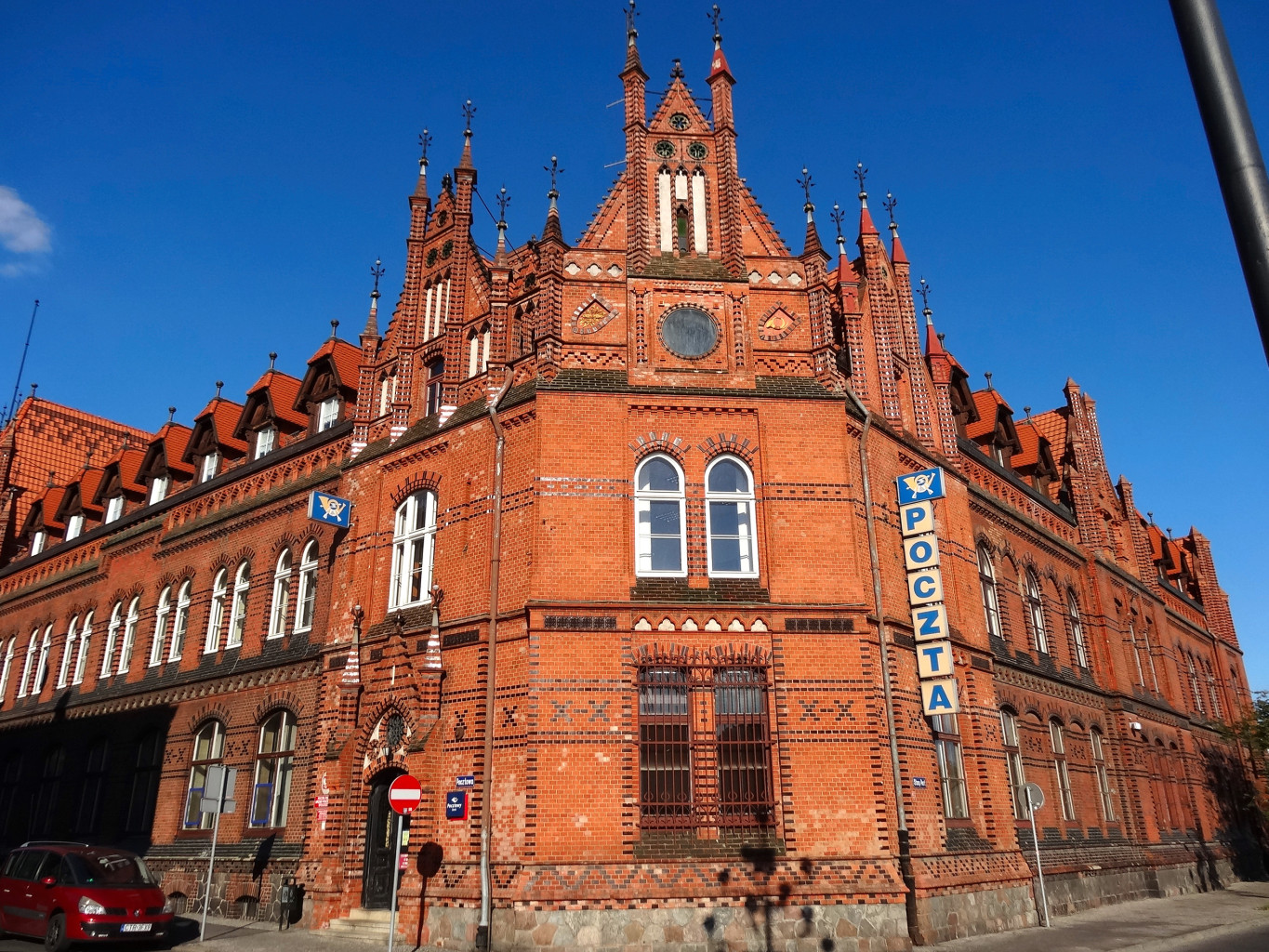
Corner with Pocztowa Street

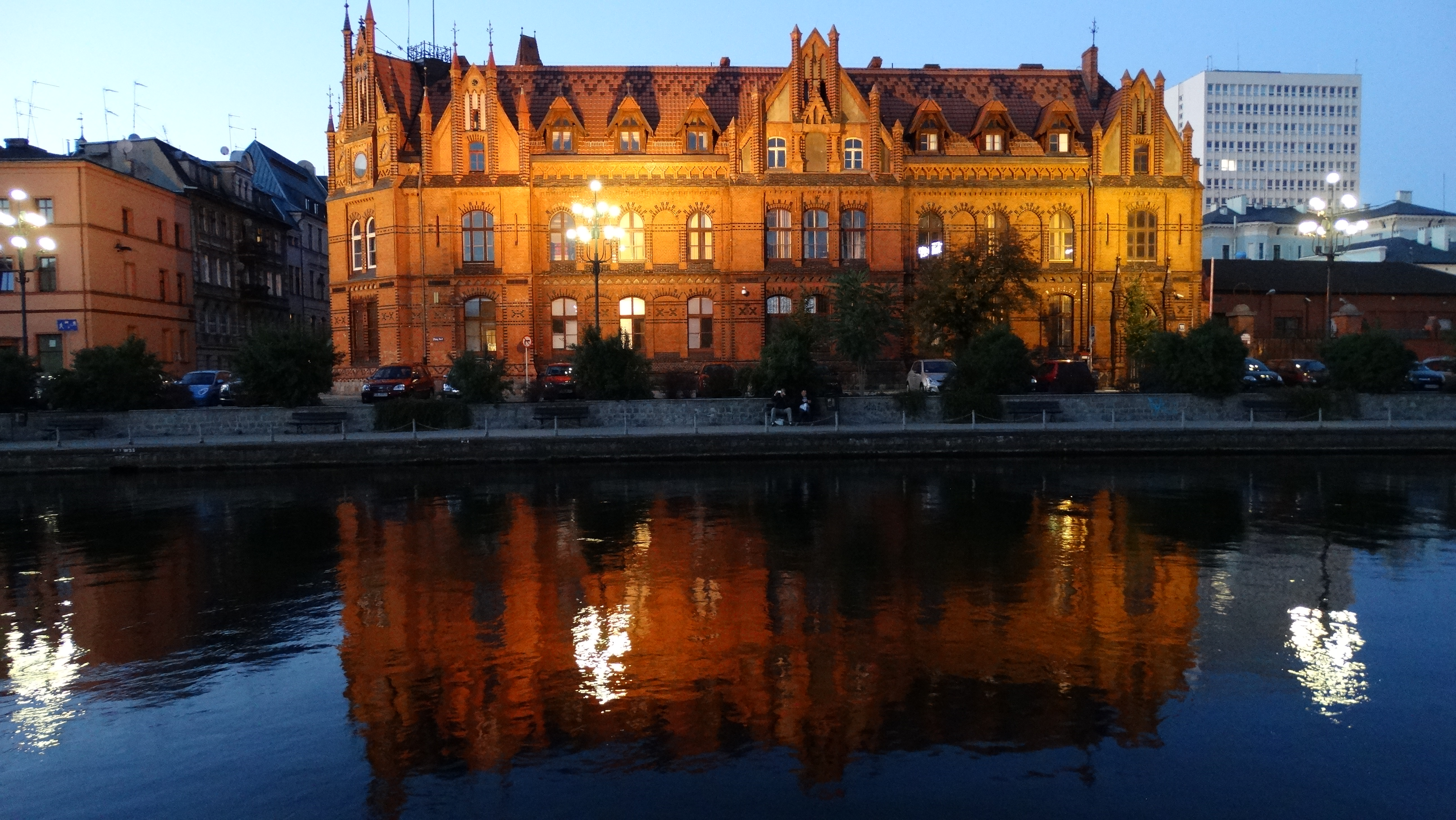
By night

=== House at N°13 ===
Kuyavian-Pomeranian Heritage list N°601410-Reg.A/1094/1-2 (February 28, 1994).

1830-1840

Wattle and daub

The building, located on the banks of the Brda river, was originally a cereal granary for the Prussian garrison established in the barracks along the Brda river. It has been erected on a rectangular plan, following wattle and daub technique. It has two storeys and an attic covered with a gable. On both sides of the house, one can admire the preserved double gates. Interiors boast massive timber structures on the ground floor. In the 1990s, the building has been converted into a restaurant, "Stary Port 13".

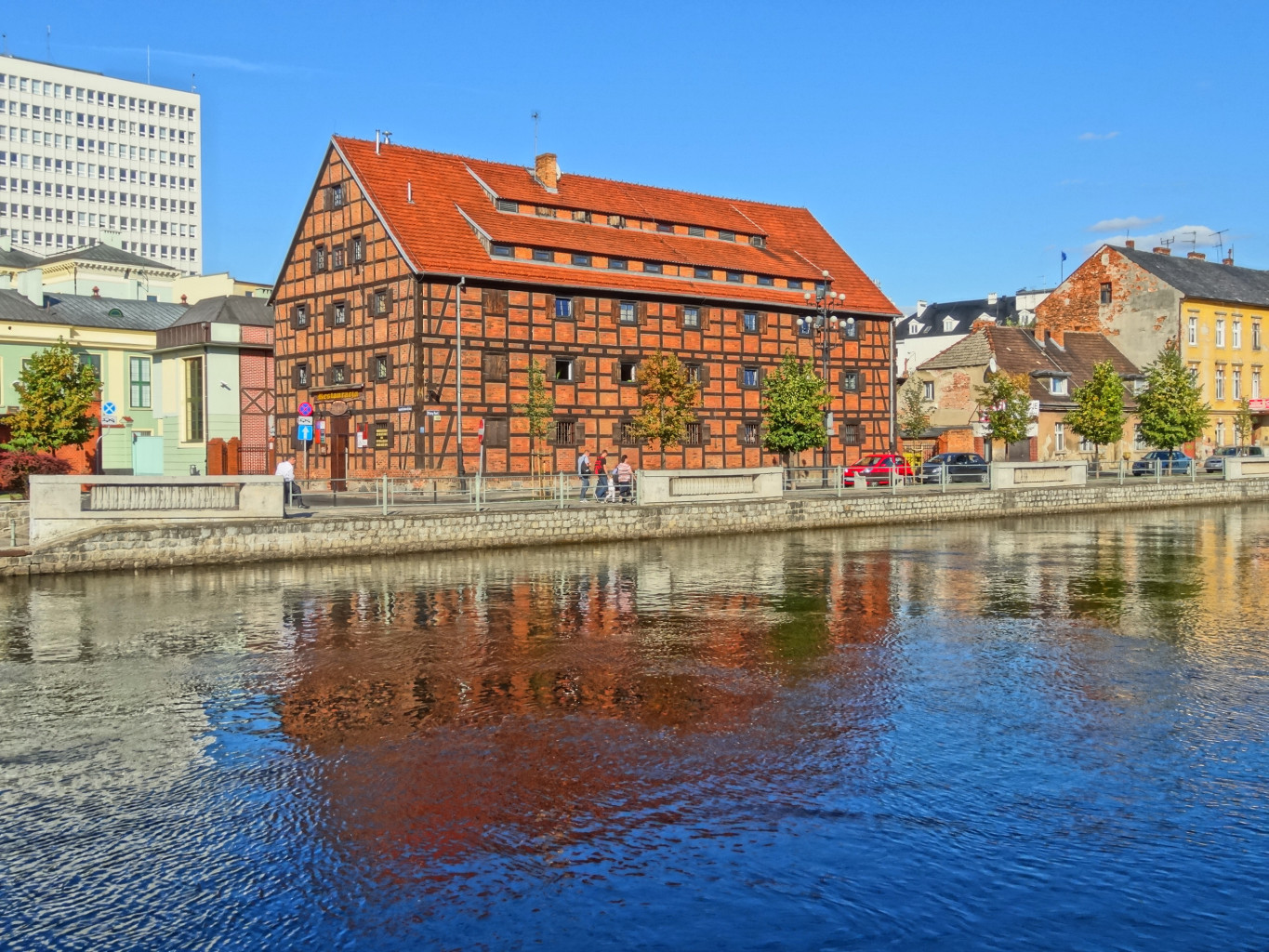
View from the Brda river

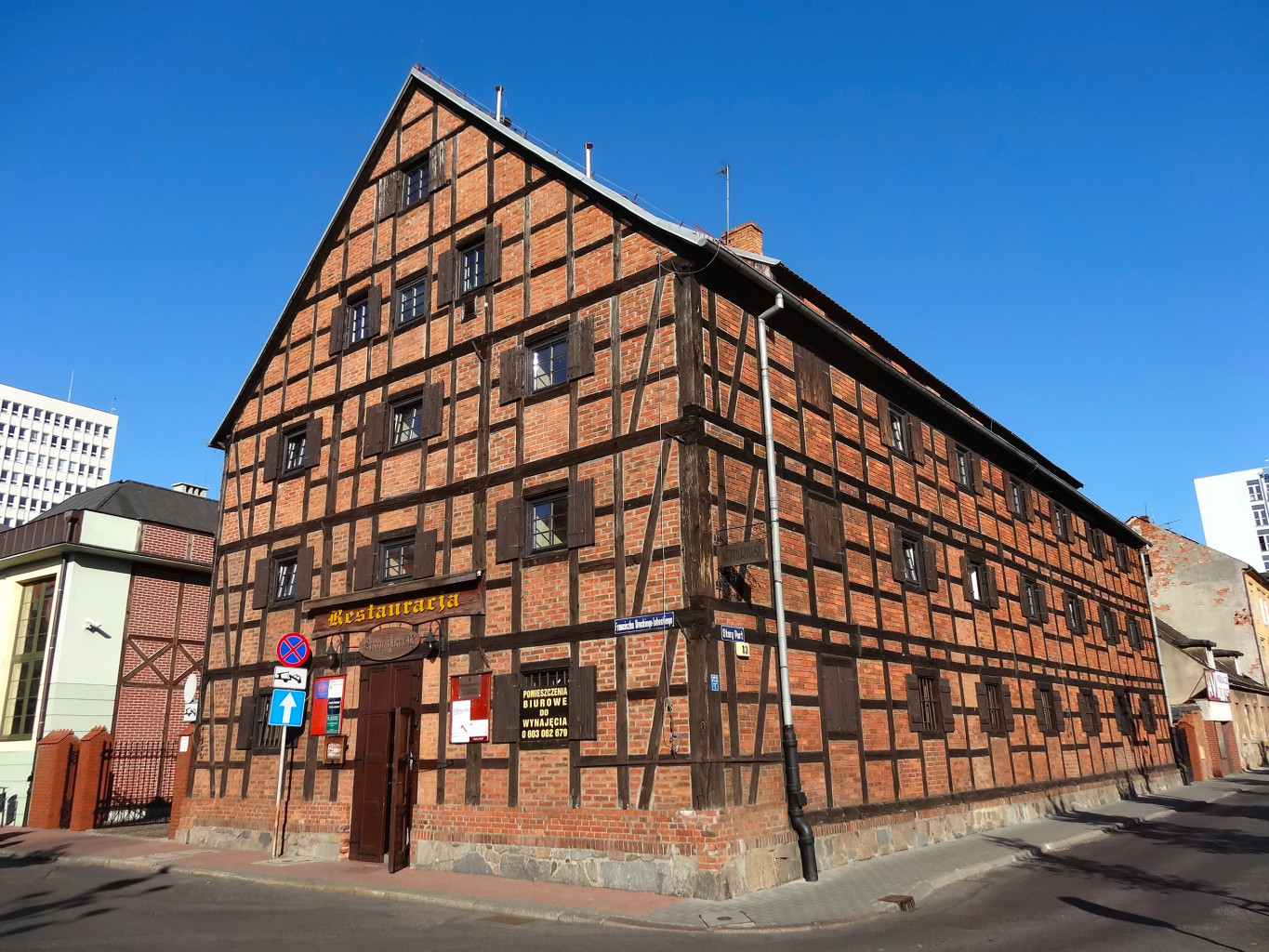
View from Stary Port Street

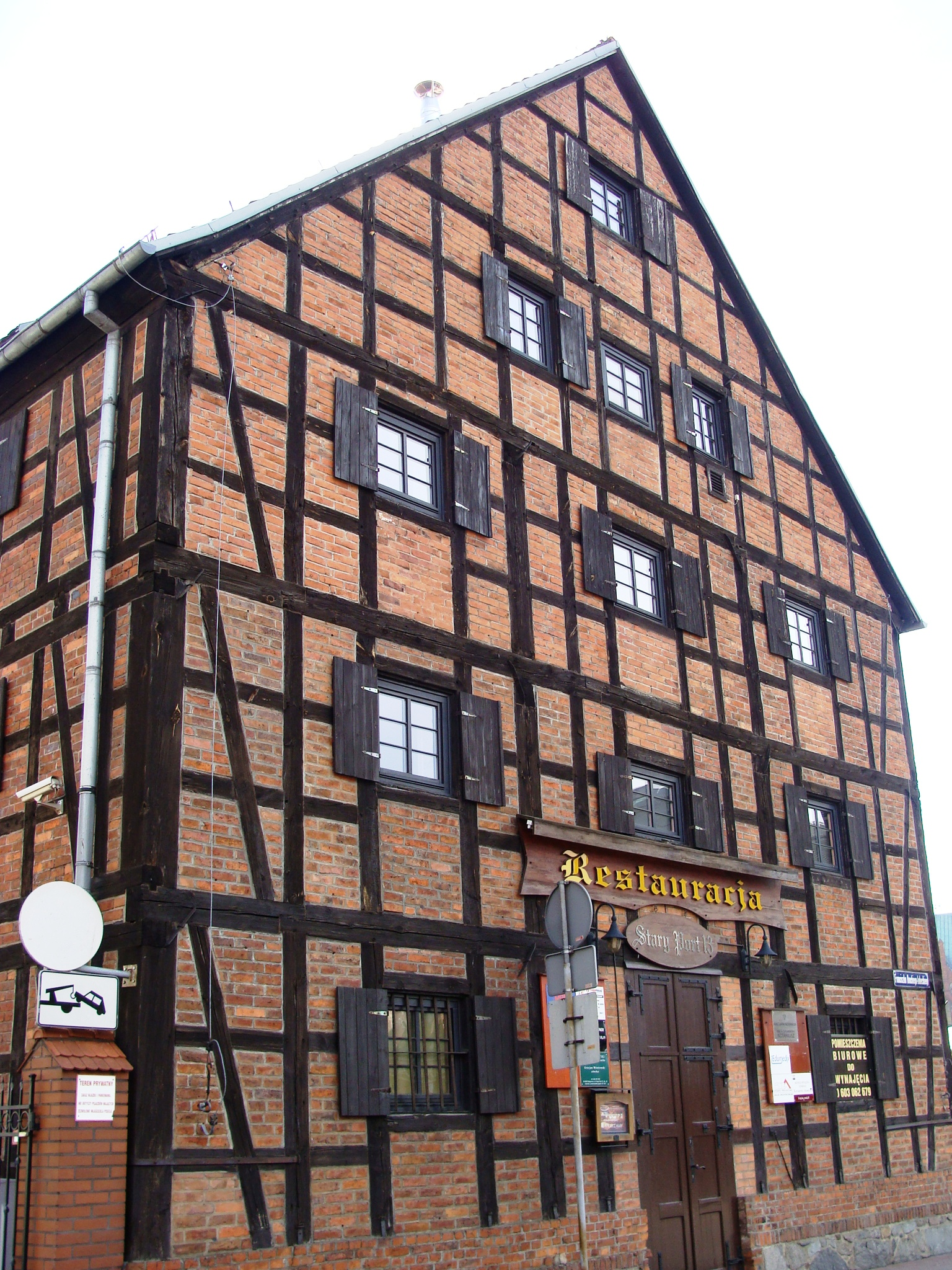
Detail of side elevation

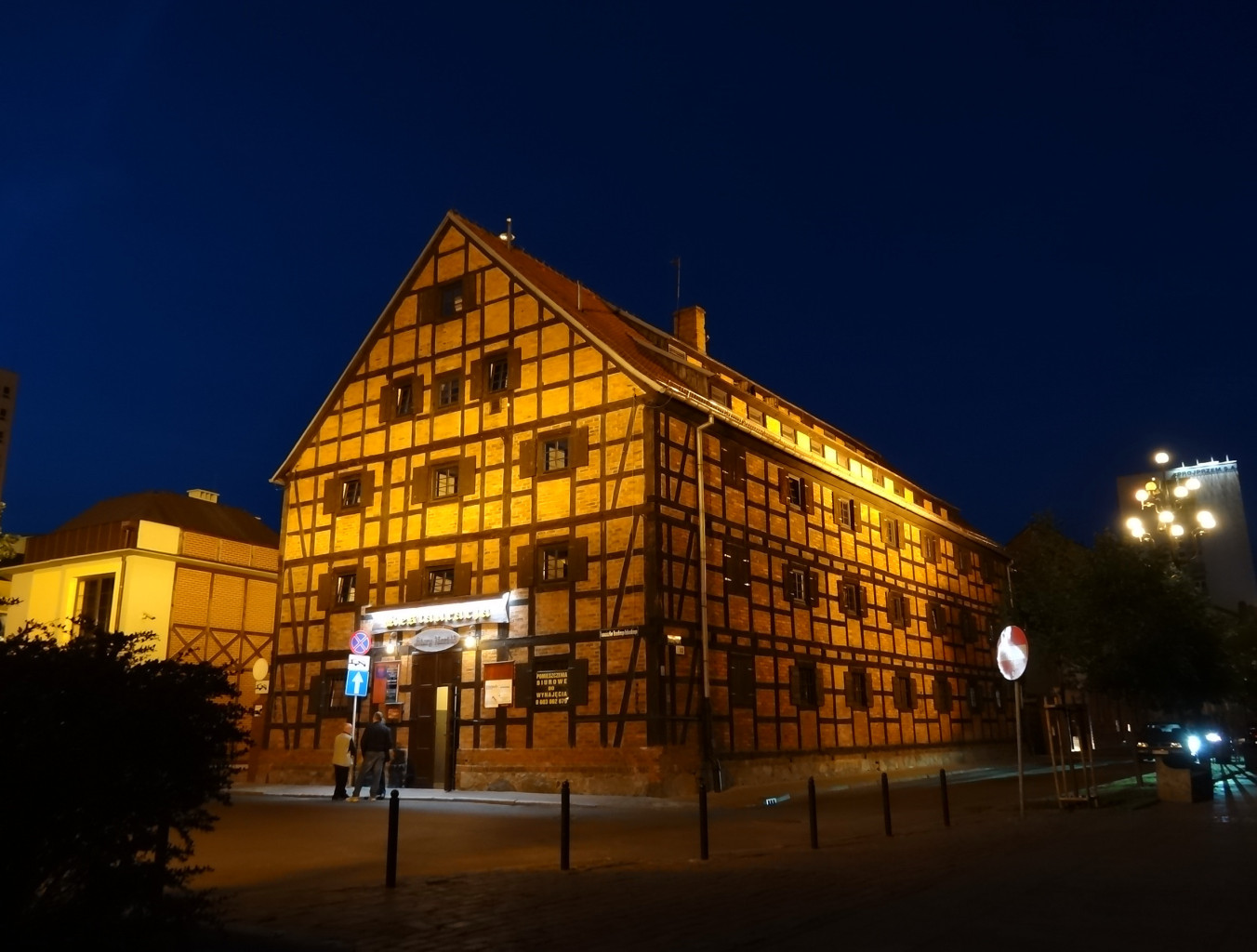
By night
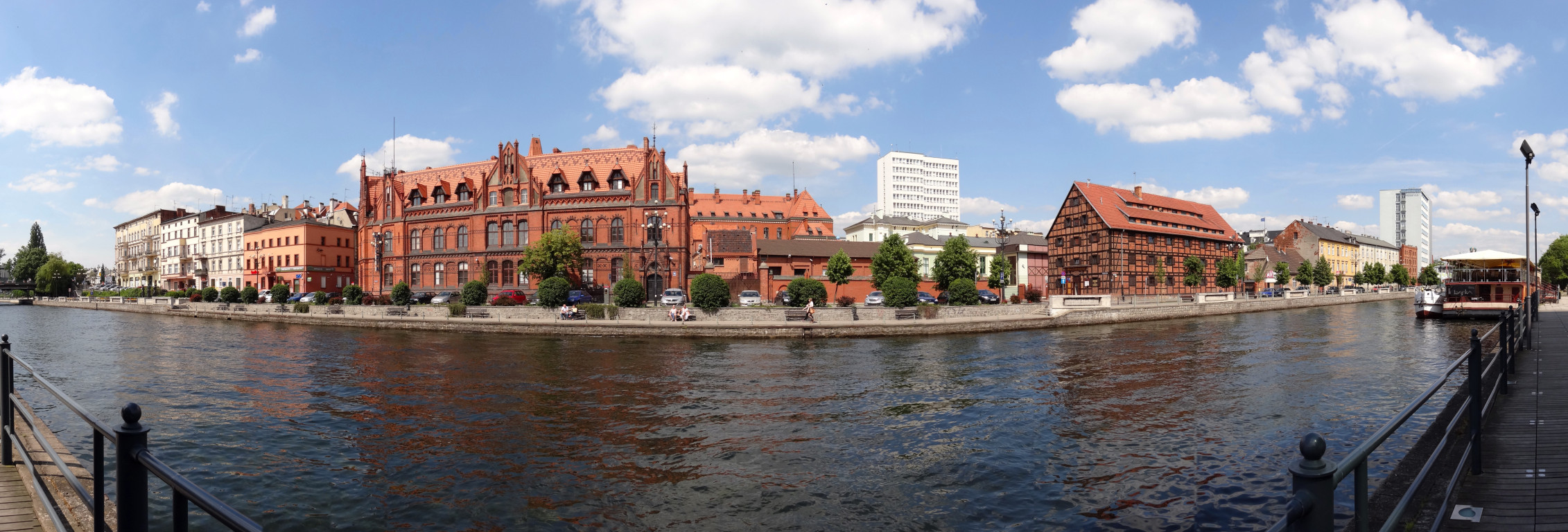
View of Stary Port street frontages from opposite river side

== See also ==
- Bydgoszcz
- Fritz Weidner
- Józef Święcicki

== Bibliography ==
- (in Polish) Derenda, Jerzy (2006). Piękna stara Bydgoszcz, t. I z serii Bydgoszcz, miasto na Kujawach. Bydgoszcz: warzystwo Miłośników Miasta Bydgoszczy. ISBN 9788391617816.
- (in Polish) Umiński, Janusz (1996). Bydgoszcz. Przewodnik. Bydgoszcz: Regionalny Oddział PTTK "Szlak Brdy".
- (in Polish) Winter, Piotr (1997). Dawne bydgoskie budynki pocztowe i z pocztą związane. Materiały do dziejów kultury i sztuki Bydgoszczy i regionu, z. 2. Bydgoszcz: Pracownia Dokumentacji i Popularyzacji Zabytków Wojewódzkiego Ośrodka Kultury w Bydgoszczy. pp. 17–43.
