= Hotel Brda, Bydgoszcz =

Hotel in Bydgoszcz, Poland

Hotel Brda
- Polish: Hotel Brda w Bydgoszczy
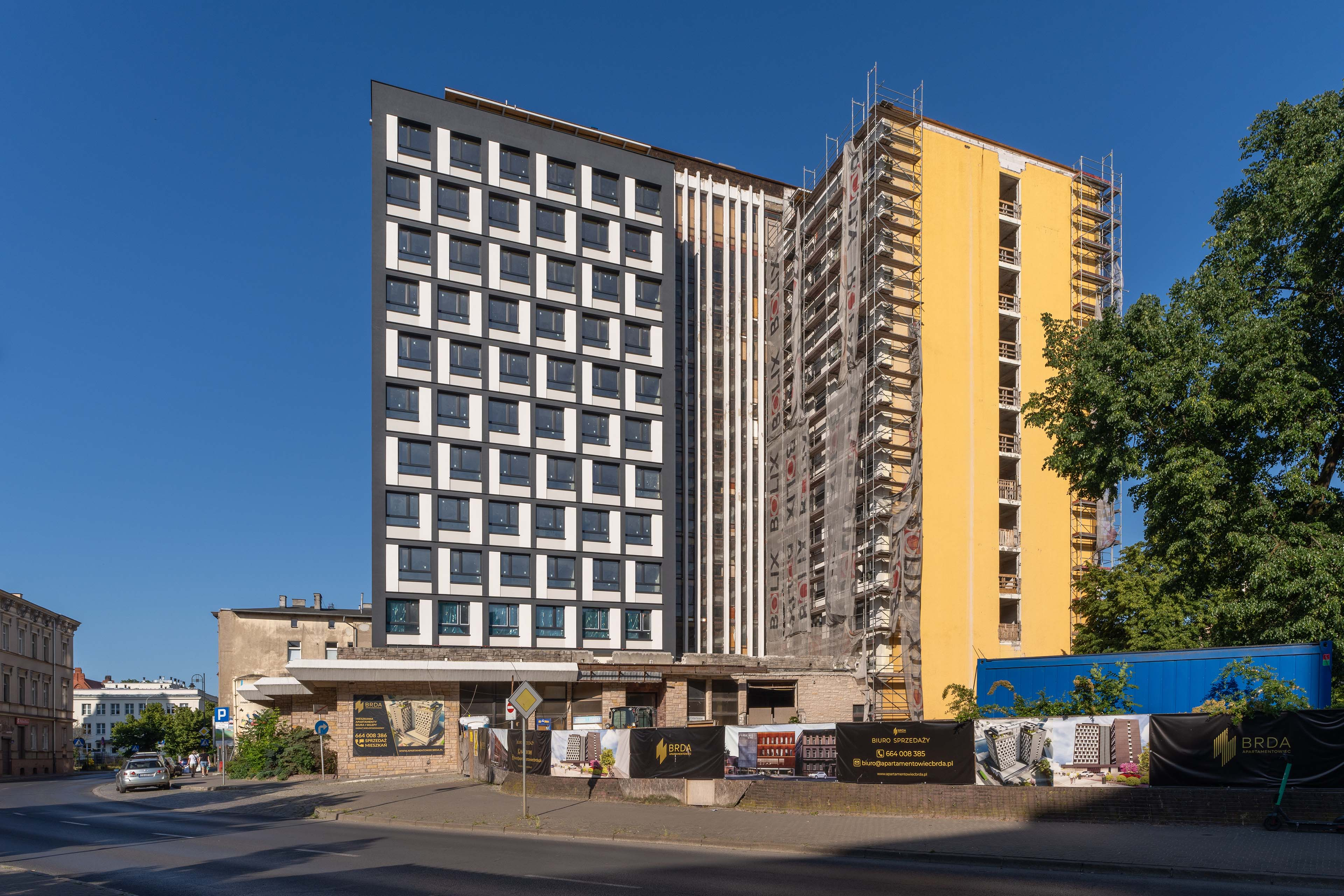
- View of the hotel from Dworcowa Street

- Location within Poland

General information
- Type: Hotel
- Architectural style: Functionalism (architecture)
- Location: Dworcowa Street 94, Bydgoszcz, Poland
- Coordinates: 53°7′55″N 17°59′45″E
- Completed: 1854
- Renovated: 1972
- Closed: 2019
- Client: Provincial Tourist Company "Brda"

Technical details
- Floor count: 11

Design and construction
- Architect: Zbigniew Kostrzewa

The Hotel Brda was a 3-star hotel located in the center of Bydgoszcz, at the junction of Dworcowa and Śniadecki Streets. It was closed in December 2019.

== History ==
The building at Bahnhoffstraße 53, in the second half of the 19th century, belonged to Wilhelm Heise, who ran an inn there. The innkeeping passed in the 1880s to its son, before becoming the "Heise's Hotel" in 1889, soon rename "Hotel Zur Neustadt" (Hotel of the new town).

After World War I, the hotel has been renamed "Hotel Nowe Miasto", keeping the same meaning and the same owner. During the 1930s, the hotel activity collapsed and the tenement returned as a habitation house, owned by Emma and Werner Albrecht. During the Interwar period, the building housed in particular a showroom for a famous local furniture maker, Otto Pfefferkorn, living at Jagiellonska Street N°2, as well as the workshop of sculptors Piotr Triebler and Teodor Gajewski.

First projects to rebuild a hotel at this very location occurred in 1956, so as to mitigate the lack of rooms in Bydgoszcz after the nationalization of the hotels in 1945. Decision was made to erect a new building, under the supervision of company Miastoprojekt. The final design was approved by the City Council after 9 years of negotiation, the construction started in 1967 and was completed on August 29, 1972. On that day, at 7:00, the hotel opened its 75-seat café, at 13:00, the 150-seat restaurant, and at 16:00, the hotel reception. In addition, other services were made available, such as the hairdresser on the second floor, a PKO desk office on third floor, a bar-club, a TV room and an observation deck (on the last floor). The hotel employed at that time 240 employees, and provided all rooms with bathrooms, telephones and radios. One of the impact of the size of the facility is still now to narrow down Śniadecki Street to the point that the end of the avenue is closed to circulation.

Since 2019 and its closure, the ensemble has been undergoing an entire revamping, transforming it into a residential building.

== Characteristics ==
The Brda Hotel is a monument in the city, by its size (the biggest in Kuyavian-Pomeranian Voivodeship at its inception in 1972), but also by its style. The building reflects all the ideals of functionalism style, which the Polish People's Republic was fond of.

The hotel had 205 rooms, including single and double rooms, with two adapted for disabled people. A restaurant, a bar, a sauna, a solarium, a massage area were also available.

== Gallery ==
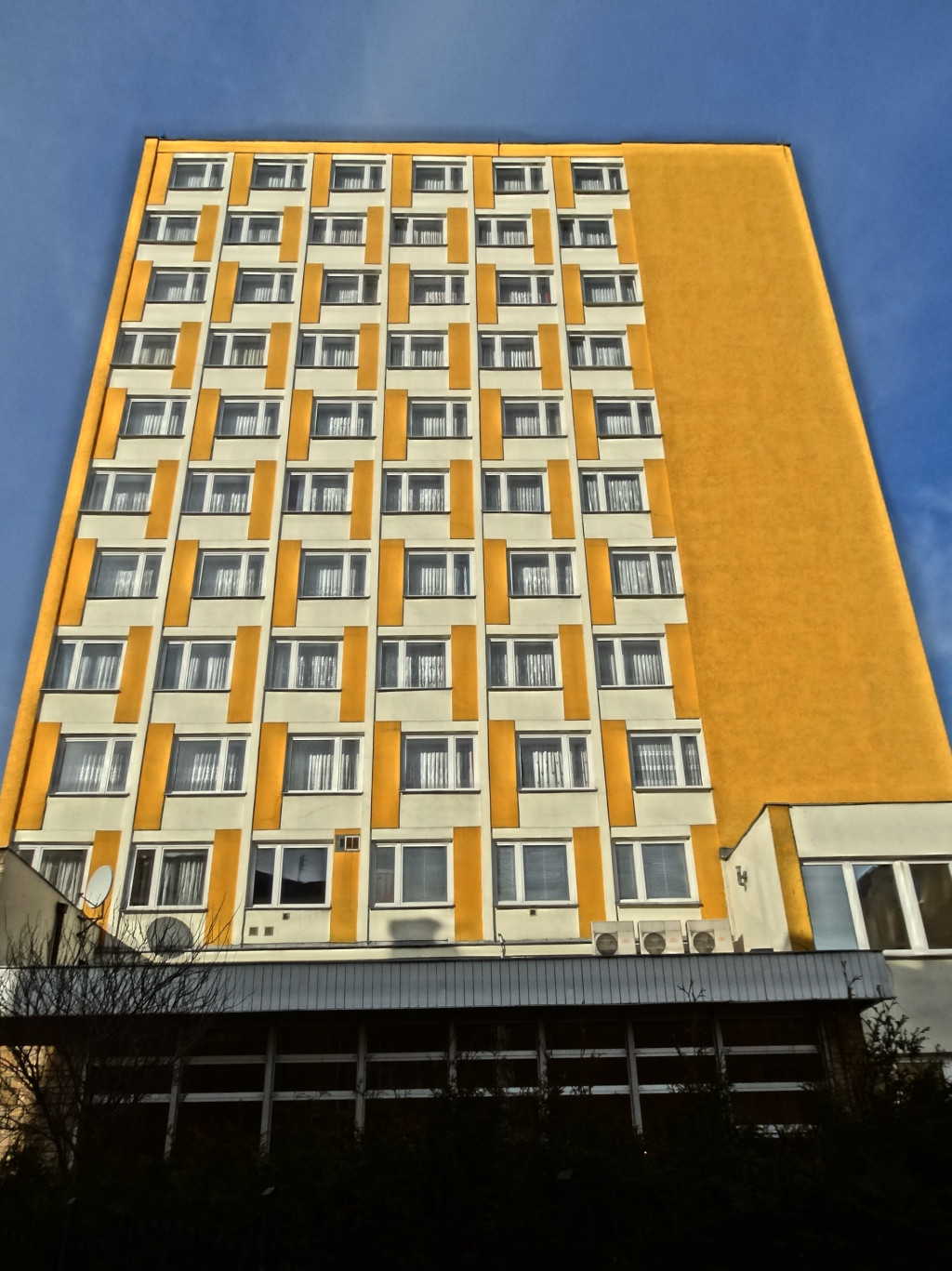
View from Śniadecki street

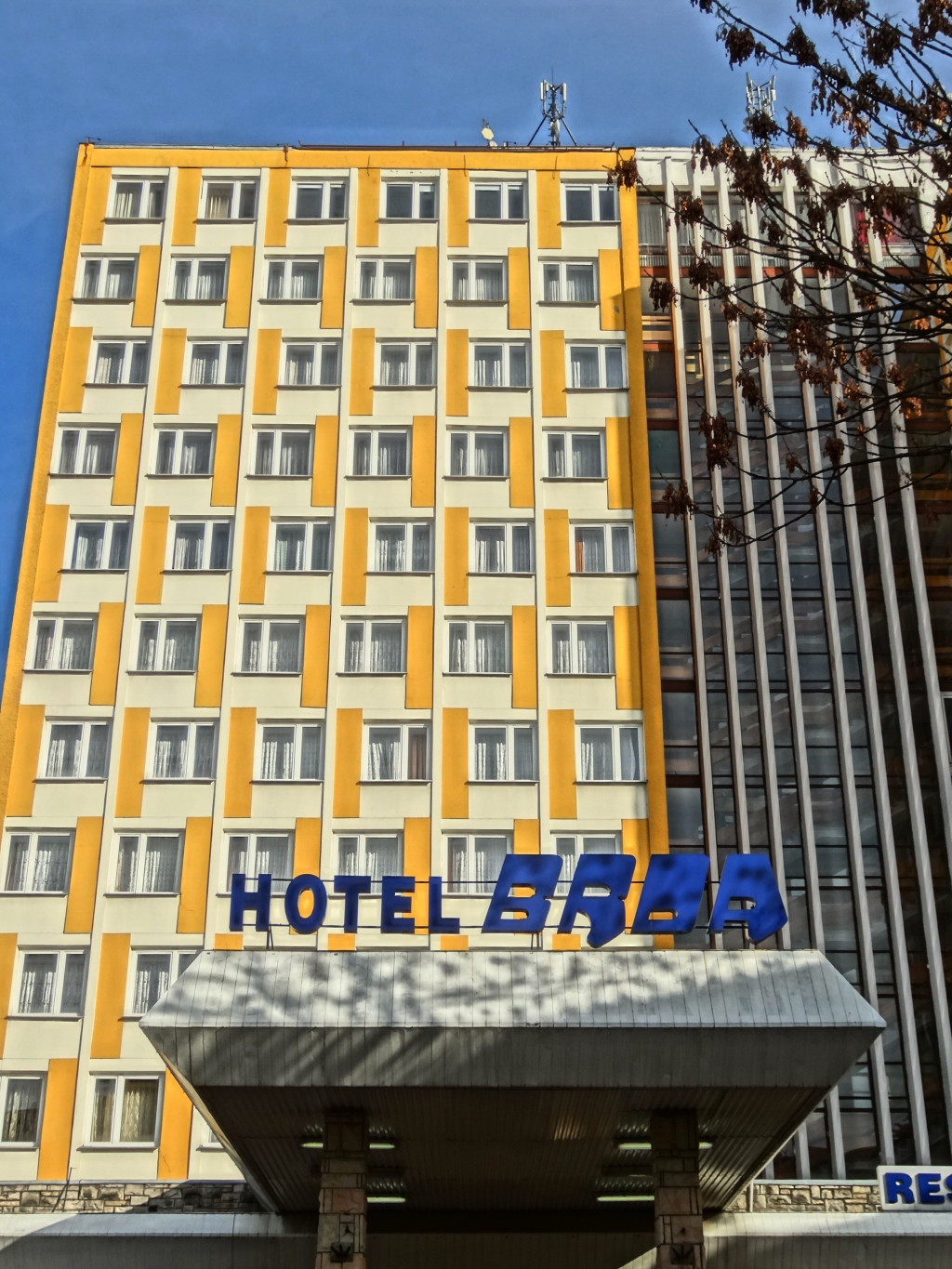
View from Dworcowa street

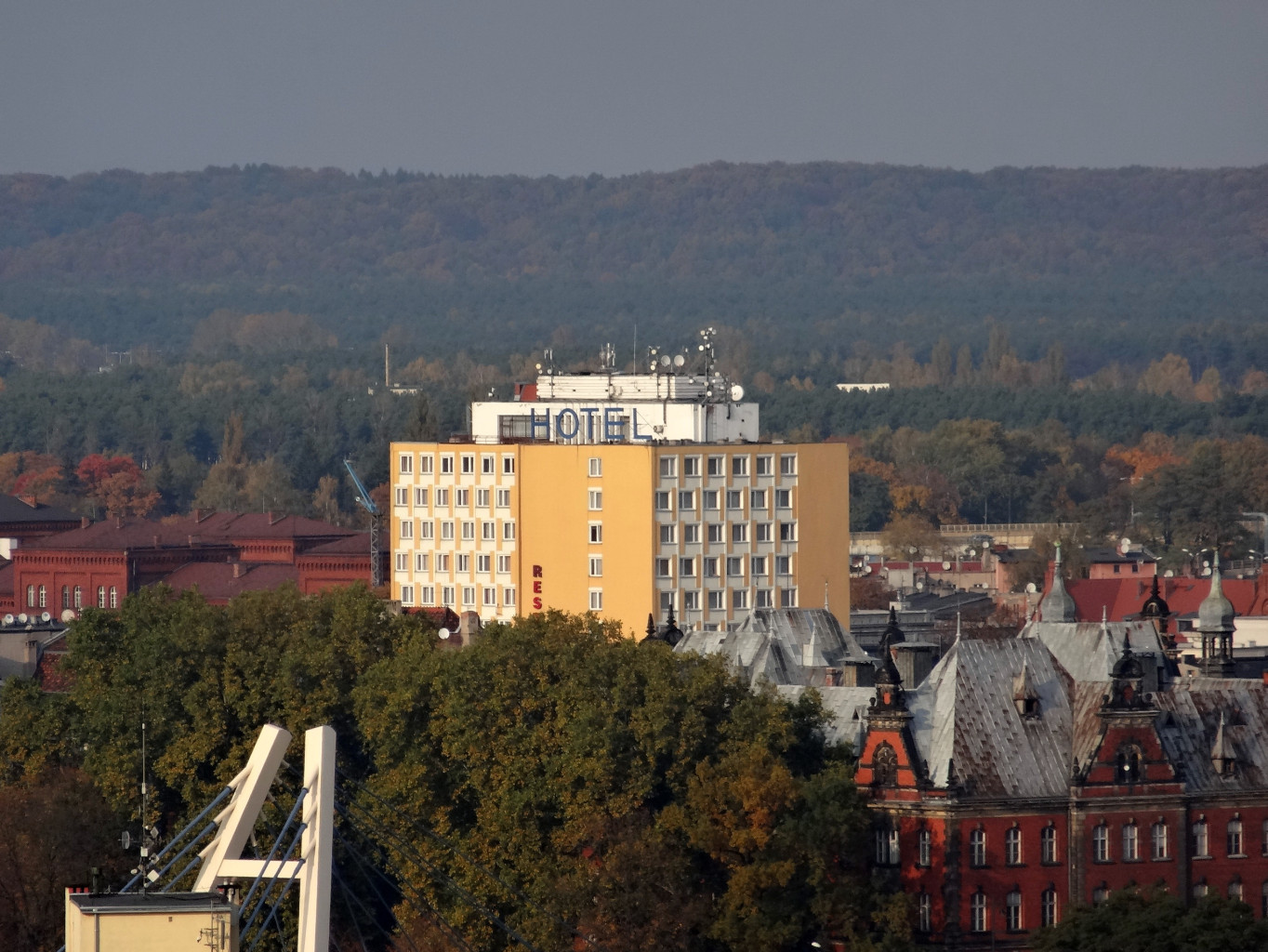
Bird eye view

== See also ==
- Bydgoszcz
- Dworcowa Street in Bydgoszcz
- Jan and Jędrzej Śniadecki Street in Bydgoszcz
- Gdańska Street, Bydgoszcz
