= Piotr Triebler =

Polish sculptor, 20th century

- Born: 22 November 1898; Ligota Bialska, German Empire
- Died: 31 March 1952 (aged 53); Bydgoszcz, Poland
- Resting place: Catholic cemetery of the Holy Trinity in Bydgoszcz; 53°07′17″N 17°57′56″E
- Known for: Sculpture
- Style: Realism

Piotr Triebler (22 November 1898 – 31 March 1952), was a Polish sculptor whose works are associated with Kuyavian-Pomeranian Voivodeship in general and with Bydgoszcz in particular.

== Biography ==
=== Period in Silesia under German Empire rule ===
Piotr Triebler was born on 22 November 1898 in Ligota Bialska, Opole region, part of then Prussian Province of Silesia. He was the son of Edward, a farmer, and Wiktoria, née Kopetzka. His family had a strong attachment to Polish feelings: Edward actively supported the Polish vote in the Upper Silesia plebiscite (1921) and was active in the Union of Poles in Germany. His mother Wiktoria came from a Polish peasant family. Lastly, his older brother took part in the second and third Silesian Uprisings of 1920 and 1921.

Piotr, coming from a farming family, was supposed to be a locksmith. He even received his locksmith diploma when graduated from the local school in Ligota. Then, he studied sculpture from 1914 to 1917, at the workshop of Wiktor Joachimski in Zabrze. In 1917, he passed the journeyman exam. The same year he was drafted to the German Imperial Army and fought on the Western Front until November 1918, as a sapper. At the end of WWI, Piotr returned to Silesia and from there he moved to the territory of the Second Polish Republic.

=== Interwar period ===
In 1920, he went to Poznań, and then settled to Bydgoszcz. In 1921, he enrolled in the National School of Arts and Crafts: under the guidance of Polish sculptors Jan Wysocki (pl) and Feliks Giecewicz (pl), he studied sculpture and medallic art and at school closure in 1923, he continued his studies at the State School of Decorative Arts in Poznań. In 1925, he graduated from sculpture and bronze department. Afterwards, Triebler made artistic study trips to Munich and Dresden. On 18 July 1936 he passed the exam of master sculptor at the Chamber of Crafts in Poznań. From his schooling years, he was remembered and respected for his solid craftsmanship and a reliable attitude to realism.

The influences that left a mark on the artist's earlier works were mainly the influence of the art of Rodin and, above all, of Ivan Mestrowicz.

Most of his works were created in his workshop at 94 Dworcowa street in Bydgoszcz, ran together with Teodor Gajewski - a sculptor with similar artistic penchants. It was the only atelier of this kind in Poznań and Pomerania. There, they realized sculptures, tombstones in bronze, wood or marble.

During this period, he created mainly monuments and figural sculptures for religious buildings in Bydgoszcz. Nevertheless, he also produced busts, portraits, reliefs and numerous plaques. As a matter of fact, Triebler at the time designed a number of commemorative plaques in Bydgoszcz, such as The liberation of the city of Bydgoszcz-1920 (1930) and The kings Stefan Batory and Jan III Sobieski (1933, together with Teodor Gajewski). He also worked for other cities in Greater Poland and Pomerania.

In 1929, he joined the Association of Pomeranian Artists; at the split of the latter in 1932, he was associated with the Pomorskie Artists Group. Eventually, he joined the merged association, Wielkopolska-Pomeranian Artists Union Bydgoszcz-Toruń in 1935 while still a member since 1934 of the Artistic and Cultural Council in Bydgoszcz.

=== World War II ===
During German occupation, Piotr Triebler stayed in Bydgoszcz. He did not join the German Artists Association, despite repeated calls from the German-appointed director of the Bydgoszcz museum. Arrested and badly beaten by Gestapo, his health deteriorated.

Between 1939 and 1945, Nazi forces destroyed the vast majority of his monuments and smaller artworks. Nonetheless, some works such as Blacksmith, Stonemason, Portrait of a painter or Sculptor's head were saved.

=== Post-war period ===
After the liberation, he joined the effort of many other artists who devoted their work to bring life out of the ruins of the devastated area around Bydgoszcz. As he did before the conflict, Triebler created sculpted monuments as well as chamber works: portraits, reliefs, medallions, but he also dealt with drawings and paintings. He realized several plaques:

- 600th anniversary of Bydgoszcz placed on the outer wall of the City Hall in 1946 (removed in 1996);
- honoring the murdered inhabitants of Bydgoszcz set in front of the town hall building on a low plinth (1946);
- to the memory of the murdered Jews in Bydgoszcz, located in the Cemetery of Bydgoszcz Heroes (1949).

The artist undertook at the time the challenge to restore a city famous monument, damaged by war, Ferdinand Lepcke's Archer (Polish: Łuczniczka), as well as recraft the statue of Mary destroyed by the Nazis in 1939, which used to stand outside the Church of the Holy Trinity. He also left behind a series of drawings, sketches and painting works; most of them were purchased by the Bydgoszcz Museum.

From 1945, he was a member of the Bydgoszcz Branch of the Association of Polish Artists and Designers, as was Bydgoszcz artist Marian Turwid from 1930. He exhibited his works in Bydgoszcz, Olsztyn, Toruń and other cities. He died from long heart condition on 31 March 1952 in Bydgoszcz, where he was buried at the Catholic cemetery of the Holy Trinity at Lotników Street.

In June 1953 in the Bydgoszcz Museum, a posthumous exhibition of his works was opened, displaying 90 sculptural works, drawings and paintings.

=== Family ===
Piotr Triebler married in 1937 Cecylia, née Konop. They had three children Janusz Zdzisław (born 1939), Gabriela Maria (born 1942) and Paweł Andrzej (born 1945). After Piotr's death, his widow Cecylia ran a profitable stonemason's workshop.

==== Murder of Gabriela and Paweł Triebler (30 March 1960) ====
At the end of March 1960, Tadeusz Rączka came to Bydgoszcz and appeared a first time at Cecylia's address, introducing himself as a conservator of monuments, who wanted to place a large order for tombstones. The criminal went back to the Trieblers' house on 30 March, where Gabriela (18), a promising athlete and Paweł (14), dreaming to follow his father's footsteps and become a sculptor, were staying. Surprised in his robbery, Rączka killed both children and fled with a meagre loot (a fur coat, a camera and two watches). Rapidly, a large-scale search began, with the police blocking exit roads from Bydgoszcz and disseminating the description of the murderer. Even though Rączka managed to leave the city, he was arrested in the vicinity of Kotomierz, four hours after the attack.

Tadeusz Rączka was condemned to death and the sentence carried out in the prison of Bydgoszcz on 10 August 1960. The funeral of the Triebler siblings, which took place on 3 April, gathered tens of thousands of inhabitants.

== Works ==
Triebler's work is very characteristic. He was particularly prolific during the interwar period.

It can be distinguished by specific features in the artistic expression influenced by realism and expressionism. In particular, Triebler's earlier works were affected by the art of Auguste Rodin and above all by Ivan Meštrović. These elements are most prominent in his famous achievements Stonemason (Polish: Kamieniarz) (1934) and Kowal (1938).

Other works include:

- Monument to the fallen Polish soldiers during WWI, at the Polish military cemetery in Aubérive in France. The bidding competition for the monument ranked Triebler second behind his colleague Teodor Gajewski, Teodor's brother Franciszek won the third prize;
- Monument to the fallen of the Greater Poland Insurgents in Inowrocław (non-existent) and in Gniezno;
- Bydgoszcz statue of the Sacred Heart of Jesus in cooperation with Teodor Gajewski (1932). It was placed initially on Poznański Square. Destroyed during WWII, it has been replicated and has been standing since 2010 on Seminaryjna Street;
- Statue of Christ the King at the Church Saint Jacob the Apostle in Lubsza (1933);
- Statue of Saint Barbara in the Oblates monastery of Kodeń on the Bug River;
- Statue of Mary of Nazareth in Inowrocław. The monument, 4 metres (13 ft) tall, was consecrated on 19 October 1937;
- Interior decoration of the church Saint Nicholas in Ludzisko (1935);
- Monument to the Heart of Jesus in Fordon (non-existent). The statue was consecrated on 2 October 1935;
- Sculptor's head (Polish: Głowa rzeźbiarza) (1934);
- Portrait of a painter (Polish: Portret malarza) (1928);
- Sportswoman (Polish: Sportsmenka) (1938);
- Statue of Mary in Pruszcz (1940);
- Statue of Mary in Golub-Dobrzyń (1939);
- Bust of Tadeusz Kościuszko in a medallion, placed on the facade of the building at 2 Królowej Jadwigi Street in Bydgoszcz;
- Busts of Józef Piłsudski (1936) and Edward Śmigły-Rydz (1938), placed in gymnasiums in Bydgoszcz;
- Monumental tombstone of Leon Wyczółkowski at the cemetery in Wtelno (1937). The monument was commissioned by the Artistic and Cultural Council in Bydgoszcz;
- Freedom Monument in Świecie unveiled on 1 May 1950. At the time, Triebler was paid 480 000 Polish złoty, an incongruous sum compared to the modest salaries under PRL era;
- Monument to Klemens Janicki (1516–1543) in Januszkowo, Janicki's home town near Żnin. The bust was unveiled on 4 May 1952, after Triebler's death;
- Statue of Saint Louise de Marillac in Saint Vincent de Paul Basilica, Bydgoszcz;
- Statue of Mary in Cekcyn near Tuchola;
- Statue of the Jesus Christ in Rynarzewo near Bydgoszcz.
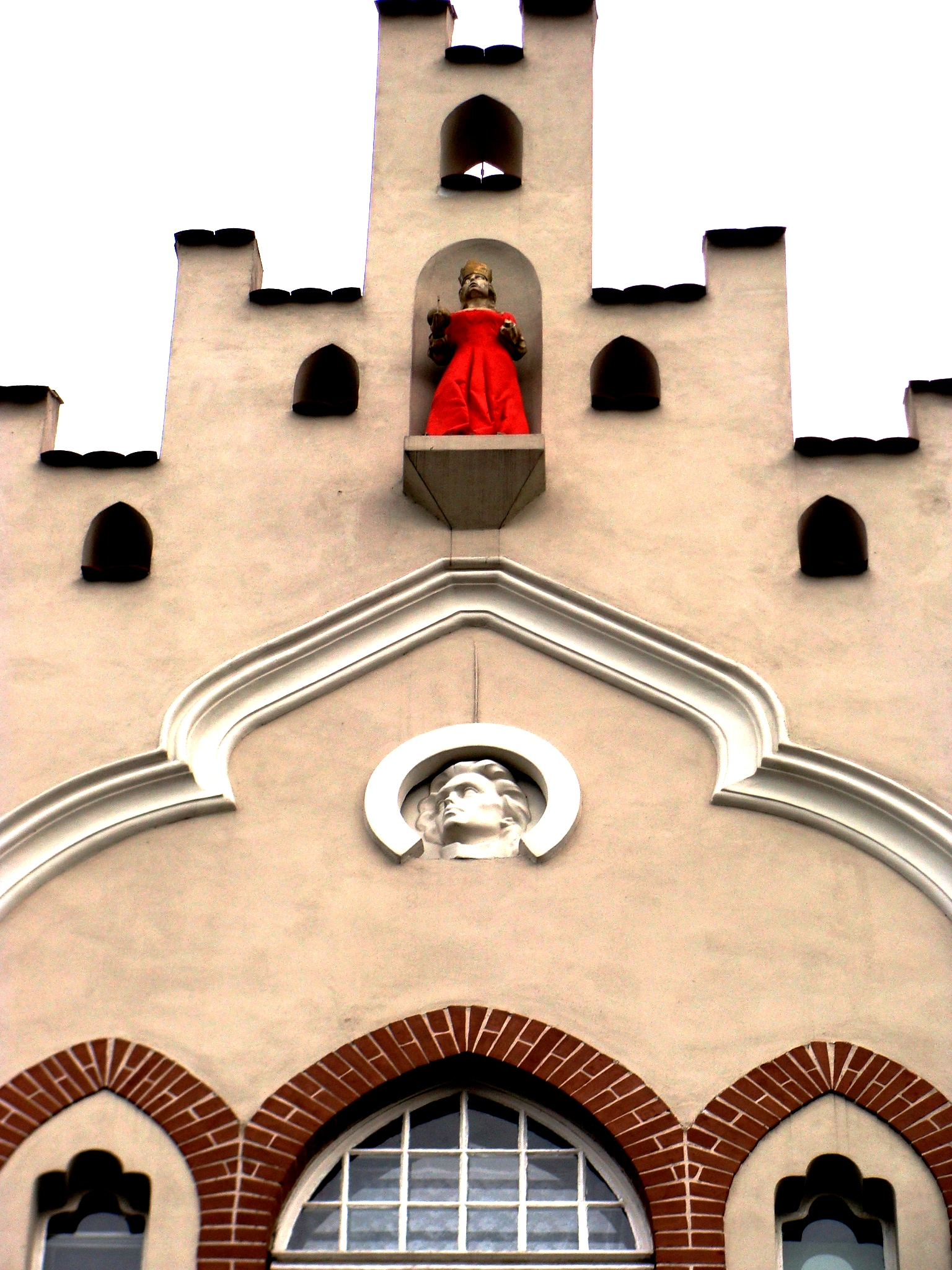
Medallion on the frontage at 2 Królowej Jadwigi Street in Bydgoszcz

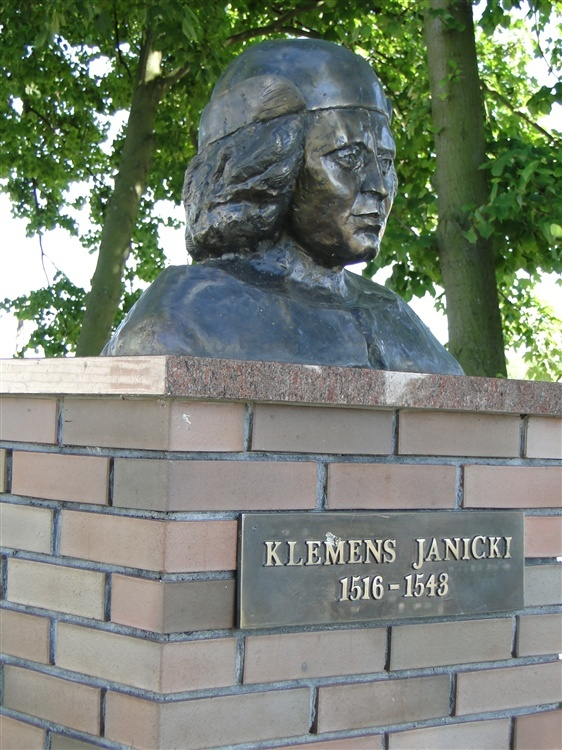
Bust of Klemens Janicki in Januszkowo

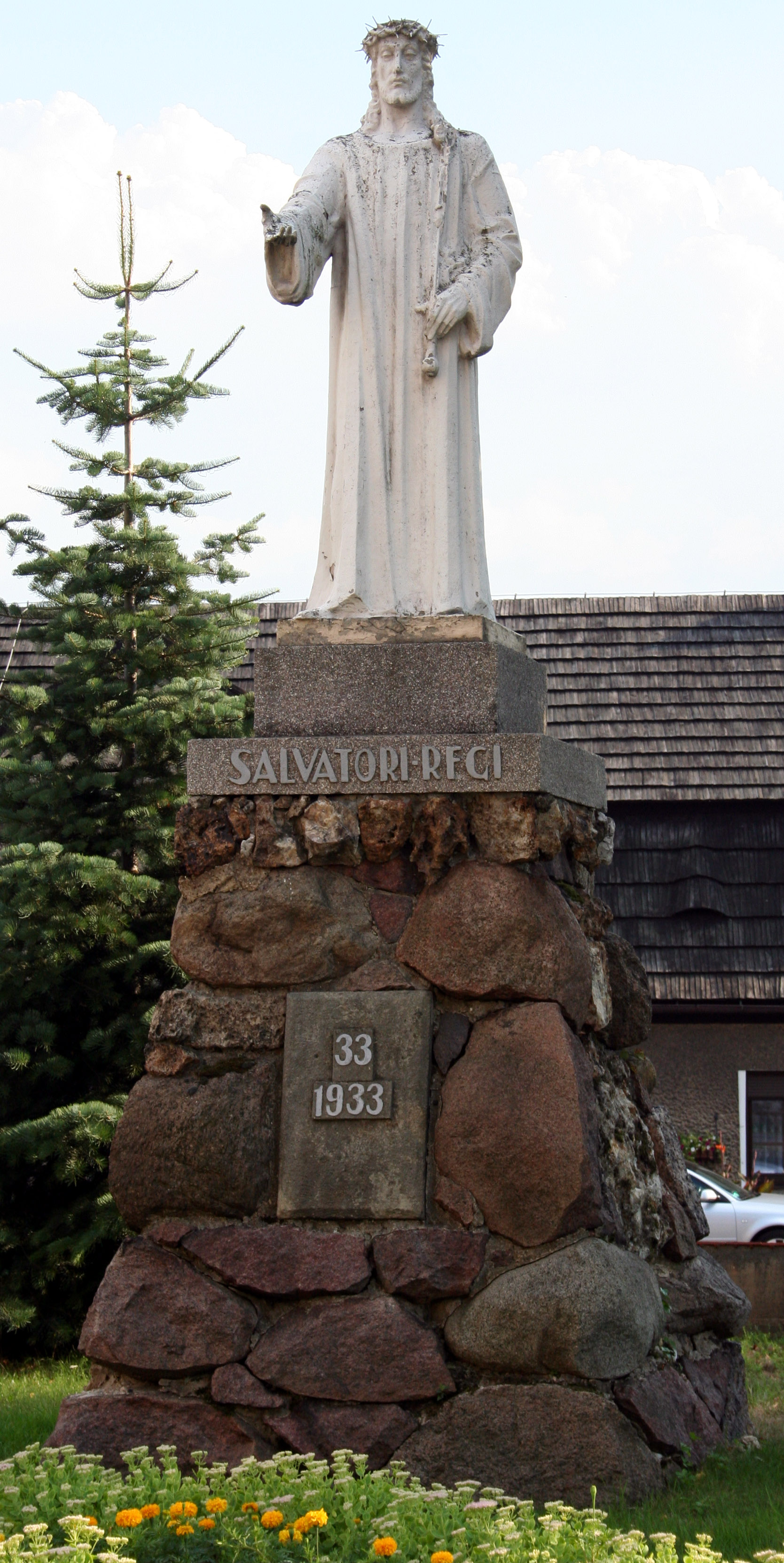
Statue of Christ the King in Lubsza

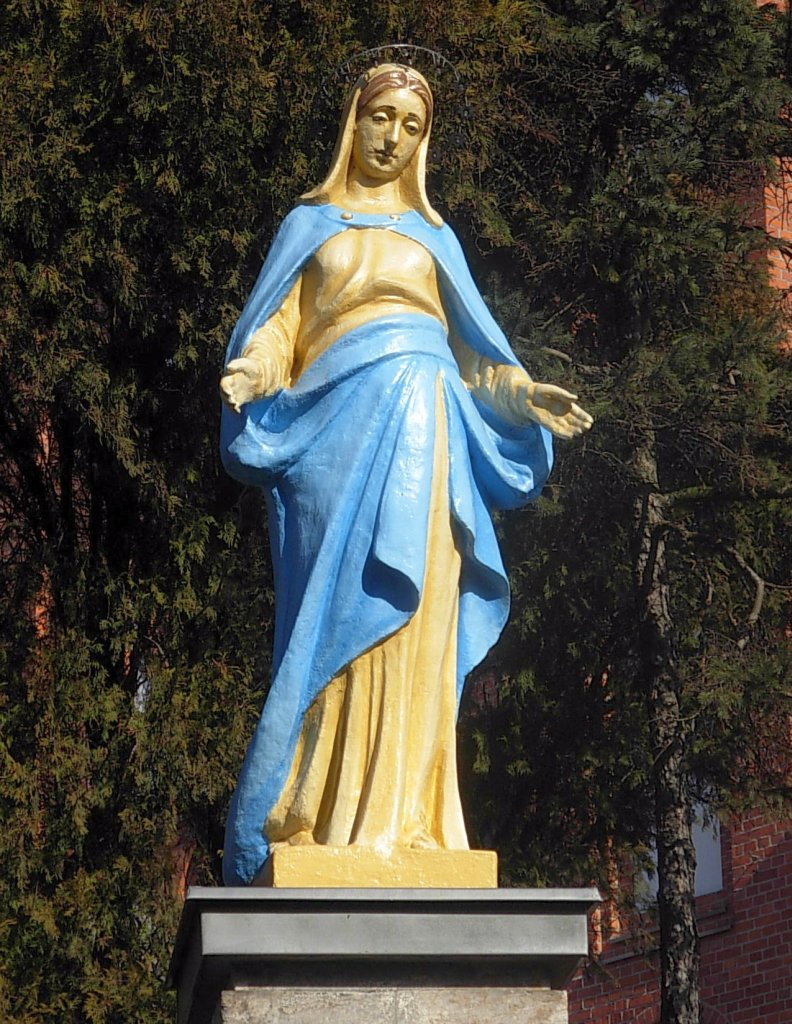
Statue of Mary outside the Church of the Holy Trinity in Bydgoszcz

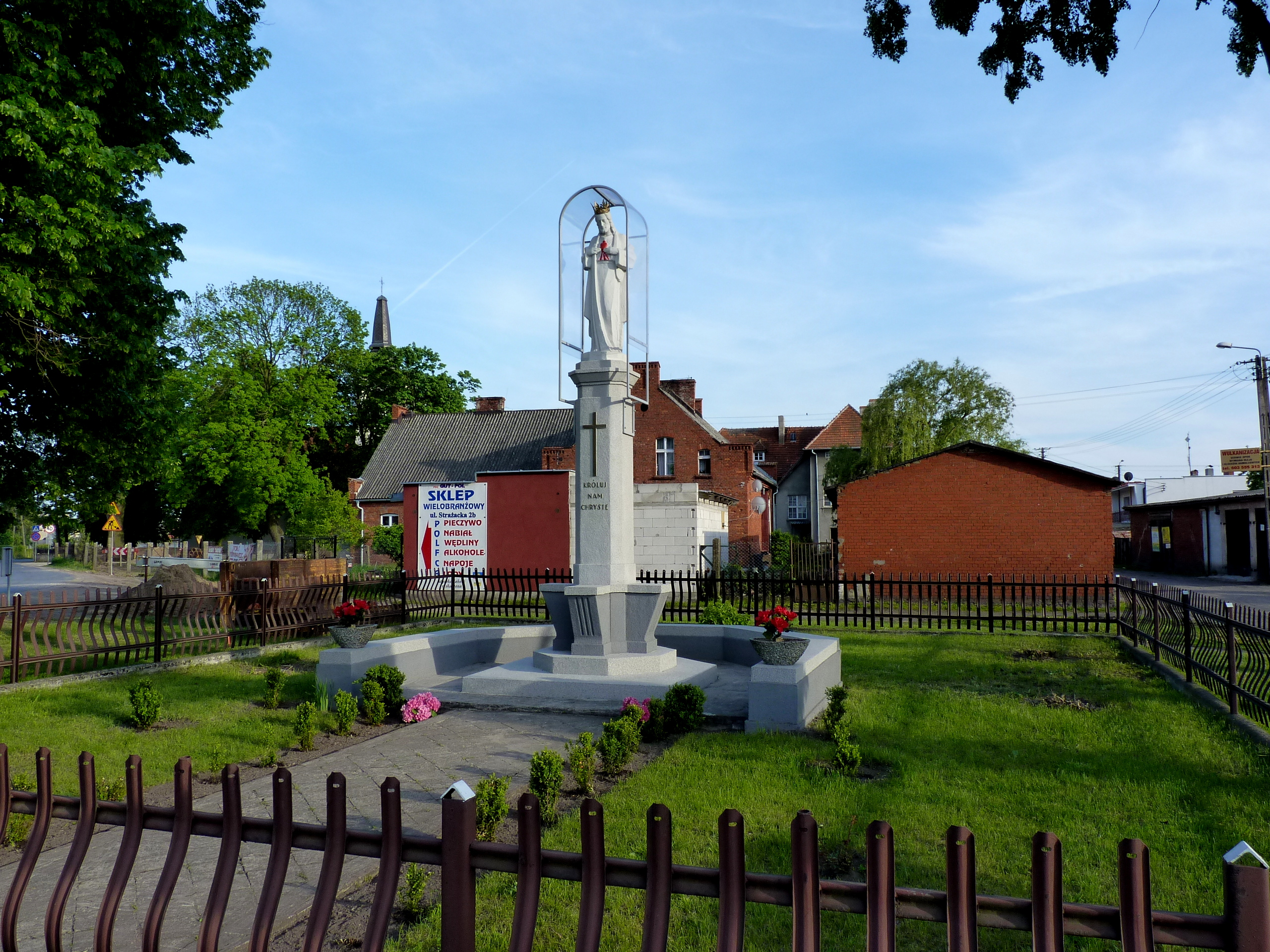
Statue of Jesus Christ in Rynarzewo

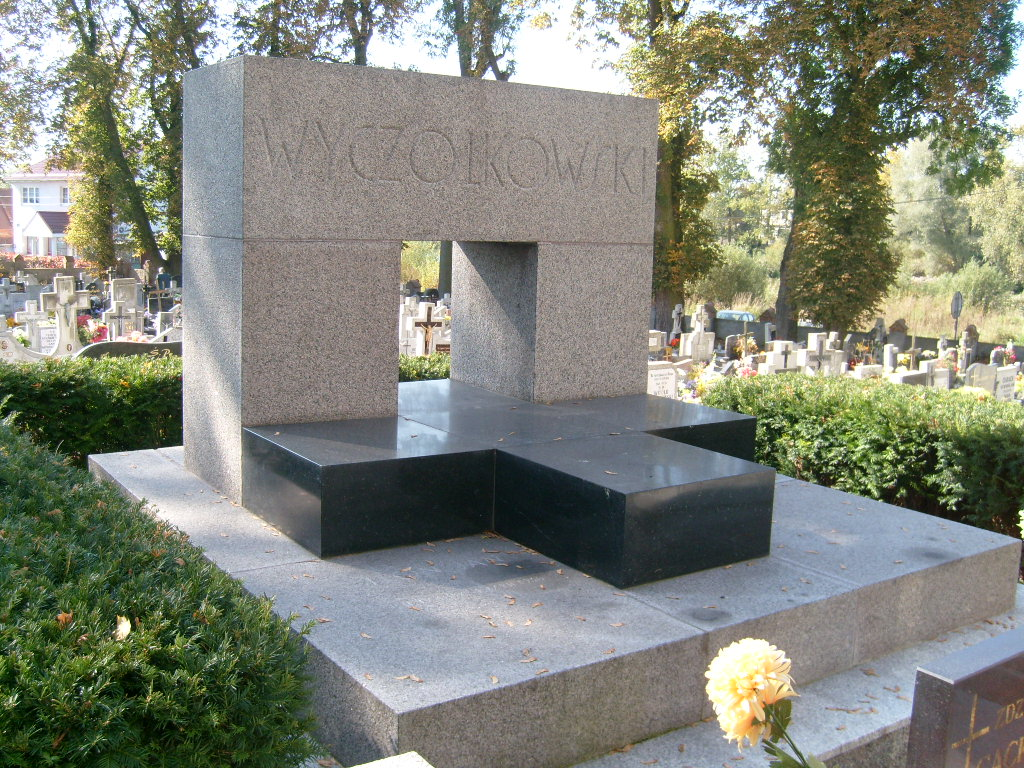
Leon Wyczółkowski's gravestone in Wtelno

== See also ==
- Bydgoszcz
- List of Polish sculptors
- List of Polish people

== Bibliography ==
- (in Polish) Błażejewski Stanisław, Kutta Janusz, Romaniuk Marek (1997). Bydgoski Słownik Biograficzny. Tom IV. Bydgoszcz: Kujawsko-Pomorskie Towarzystwo Kulturalne. pp. 109–110. ISBN 8385327428.
- (in Polish) Bacciarelli, Marceli (1976). Piotr Triebler – artysta zapomniany. Kalendarz Bydgoski. Bydgoszcz: Towarzystwo Miłośników Miasta Bydgoszczy. pp. 117–123.
- (in Polish) Szmańda, Edward (1981). Piotr Triebler. Kalendarz Bydgoski. Bydgoszcz: Towarzystwo Miłośników Miasta Bydgoszczy. pp. 141–142.
