= Teodor and Franciszek Gajewski =

Sculptor, painter, Poland, 20th century

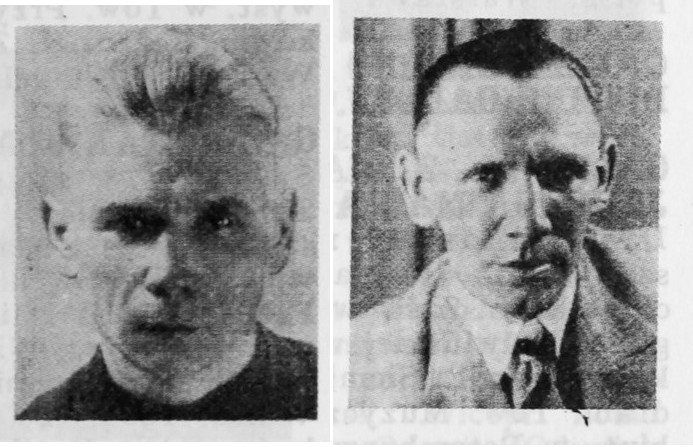
- Franciszek (left), Teodor (right)
- Born: January 30, 1897 (Franciszek), May 30, 1902 (Teodor); Bydgoszcz, German Empire
- Died: April 17, 1969 (aged 72) (Franciszek), November 7, 1948 (aged 46) (Teodor); Bydgoszcz, Poland
- Resting place: Bydgoszcz
- Awards: (Franciszek)

Brothers Teodor and Franciszek Gajewski were sculptors and painters, who lived in Bydgoszcz, Poland in the 20th century.

== Lifes ==
=== Childhood ===
Both brothers were born in Bydgoszcz: Franciszek on January 30, 1897, and Teodor on May 30, 1902. Their father Teofil was a shoemaker, their mother was Antonina née Relka.

Franciszek attended elementary school in Bydgoszcz. He was drafted in the Imperial German Army; in 1916, he fought on the western front and fell into captivity in Belgium.

Teodor attended primary school in Bydgoszcz. Having joined the scouts movement at 15, he actively participated in 1917 in the local recruitment and training campaigns.

=== Second Polish Republic ===
Released in 1918, Franciszek volunteered in Józef Haller's Polish Army in France: he returned to Poland in 1919. In 1920, Franciszek took part in Polish–Soviet War. During this period, he had his studio in the attic of the Bydgoszcz Museum, overlooking the Old Market Square.

==== Teodor ====
After the outbreak of Greater Poland uprising, Teodor acted in the underground. He participated in the campaign of acquiring weapons, sending volunteers, collecting information about German troops and Grenzschutz Ost elements. The Grenzschutz was a paramilitary voluntary formation operating on the eastern frontiers of the Weimar Republic together with Freikorps and Selbstschutz.

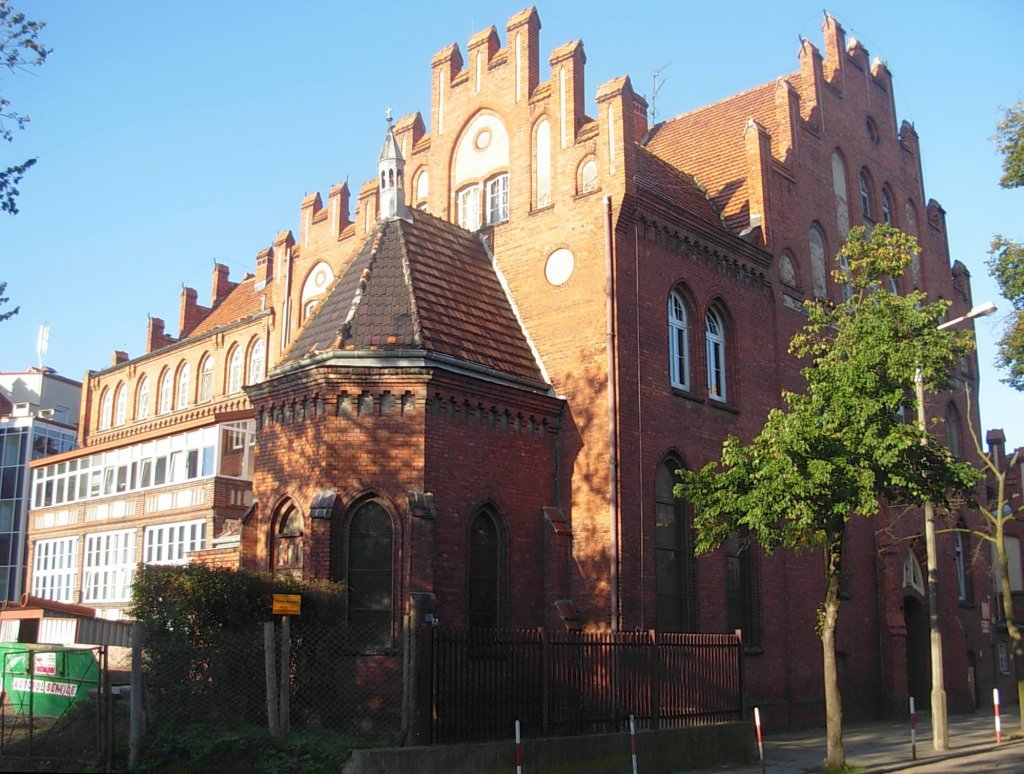
Tadeusz Browicz Hospital for Infectious Diseases, today's Observation and infectious diseases Hospital

He spent his military service period (1924-1925) in the 8th Mounted Rifle Regiment (Polish: 8 Pułk Strzelców Konnych), in Chełmno.

=== WWII and Polish People's Republic ===
Teodor died on October 7, 1948, at the Tadeusz Browicz Hospital for Infectious Diseases, in Świętego Floriana Street, Bydgoszcz. He lived at Garbary Street 23, in Okole district. He was buried at the Catholic Cemetery of Our Lady of Perpetual Help, in Szwederowo district, Bydgoszcz.

Franciszek spent the years of war in Bydgoszcz. After the liberation, he joined the mainstream of artistic life. He lived at Nowodworska street 25, in Szwederowo district. He died on April 17, 1969, in Bydgoszcz. Like his brother, Franciszek was buried at the Catholic Cemetery of Our Lady of Perpetual Help, in Bydgoszcz.

== Artistic career ==
=== Franciszek ===
In the early 1920s, he studied at the State School of Artistic Industry under the supervision of professors Bronisław Bartel, Leon Dołżycki, Karol Mondral and Antoni Procajłowicz.

He was characterized by a great creative commitment. His favorite themes were flowers, female nudes, still lifes. Furthermore, he depicted many city architectures, from Pomerania but essentially from Bydgoszcz. In this vein, Franciszek left many paintings and drawings of the city, portraying particularly the Bydgoszcz Venice near Mill Island. He painted Bydgoszcz nooks and crannies at different times of the day and night.

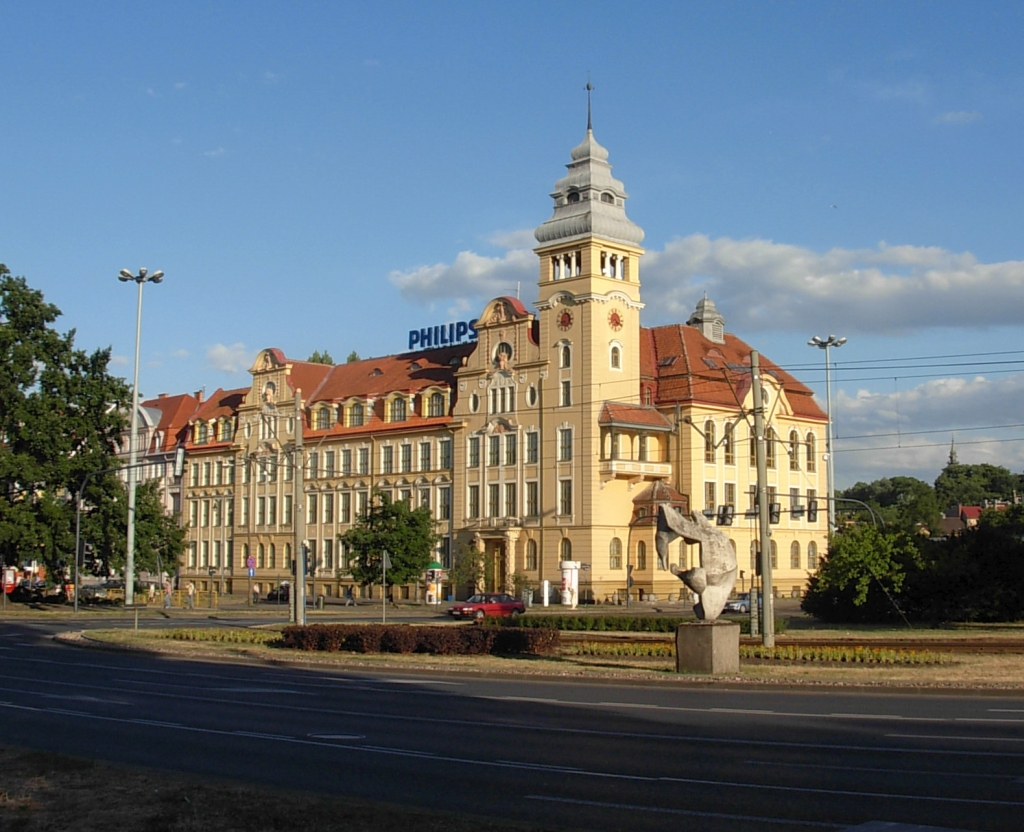
State School of Artistic Industry, today's Mechanical School Nr.1

He first exhibited his works in 1926 at the City Museum. In 1937 and 1938, he received the Bydgoszcz City Prize and several of his works were purchased by the City Hall. He was a member of the Association of Polish Artists and Designers (Polish: Związek Polskich Artystów Plastyków, ZPAP) and the Artistic and Cultural Council of Bydgoszcz (Polish: Rada Artystyczno-Kulturalna w Bydgoszczy). In 1931, the Gajewskis and Piotr Triebler took part in a competition for the design of the Monument to the Fallen Poles (soldiers of the 1st Polish Division) who died in July 1918 in the fields of Champagne, France. Franciszek received the second prize for this project to be erected in Saint-Hilaire-le-Grand's cemetery, for which he designed the gate and fences.

After WWII, Franciszek re-joined the Bydgoszcz Branch of the ZPAP. He participated in regional and national exhibitions.

In 1950, he won the first prize of the city of Bydgoszcz (painting department) in a competition dedicated to "The beauty of Bydgoszcz in picture and graphics". In 1958, he was awarded the Bydgoszcz art award for lifetime achievement. The City Museum organized exhibitions of his works in 1958 and in 1969 (after his death).

Franciszek had a stormy temperament associated with a profound sense of artistic achievement. His dissatisfaction sometimes drove him to destroy his works, considering them imperfect or of unworthy. Hence many of his drawings have been lost or damaged.

=== Teodor ===
In 1920-1923, he followed the path of his brother at the State School of Artistic Industry, but in the sculpture department. His professors were sculptors Jan Wysocki and Feliks Giecewicz.

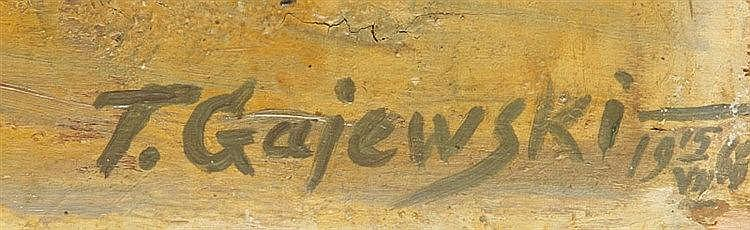
Teodor's Signature

After his military service, he returned in 1925 to Bydgoszcz. Together with his friend Piotr Triebler, also a graduate of the State School of Artistic Industry, he ran a sculpture and stonemason's workshop, located at 13 Królowej Jadwigi Street. Later they moved to 94 Dworcowa street in Bydgoszcz. It was the only atelier of this kind in Poznań and Pomerania. There, they realized sculptures, tombstones in bronze, wood or marble.

He was a multi-talented activist and organizer of the art movement in Bydgoszcz. In 1932, he co-founded of the Pomeranian Artists Group. Like Franciszek, he was a member of the Artistic and Cultural Council of Bydgoszcz. In 1931, Teodor won the first prize in the competition for the design of the Monument to the Fallen Poles in Aubérive's cemetery.

As an artist, Teodor most often used wood and plaster. He presented his works at exhibitions in Bydgoszcz, Poznań, Toruń and Warsaw. In Bydgoszcz, he co-created with Piotr Triebler in 1932 the Statue of the Sacred Heart of Jesus made from sandstone from Szydłowiec: destroyed during the Second World War, a copy stands today in Seminaryjna Street. Teodor additionally designed in 1935 a monumental cross erected in Szwederowo district.

Some of his works were purchased by the City Museum, while many others were acquired by private amateurs, mainly residents from Bydgoszcz, Gniezno, Poznań, Szczecin or Warsaw.

== Recognition ==
=== Franciszek ===
- Bydgoszcz City Prize (1937, 1938);
- First prize of the city of Bydgoszcz in the painting category (1950);
- Bydgoszcz art award for lifetime achievement (1958);
- Silver Cross in the Polish Virtuti Militari Order (1921), for his actions during the Polish-Soviet War;
- Badge of honor as "Bydgoszcz Meritorious Citizen".

== Notable works ==
=== Franciszek ===
A large collection of his works (drawings, watercolors, oil works) is in the Leon Wyczółkowski Regional Museum in Bydgoszcz.

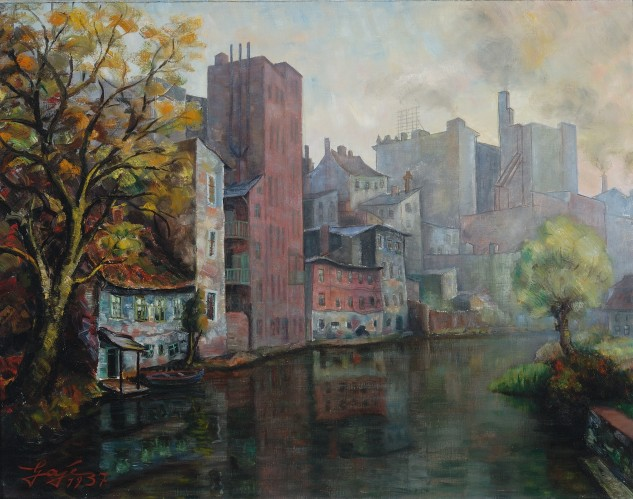
Wenecja Bydgoska, 1937

Among his many city views, one can cite:

- Targ na Starym Rynku (Market in the Old Town Square);
- Wenecja Bydgoska (Bydgoszcz Venice);
- Zamek w Gniewie (Gniew Castle );
- Ratusz w Chełmnie (Town Hall in Chełmno);
- Spichrze w Grudziądzu (Granaries in Grudziądz).

=== Teodor ===
Small works:

- Głowa Chrystusa (Christ's Head);
- Bust of Józef Piłsudski, placed in Bydgoszcz City Hall, destroyed by the Nazis;
- Judasz (Judas);
- Faun.

Teodor was the creator of larger monuments:

- Dobry Pasterz (The Good Shepherd), set up Gniezno;

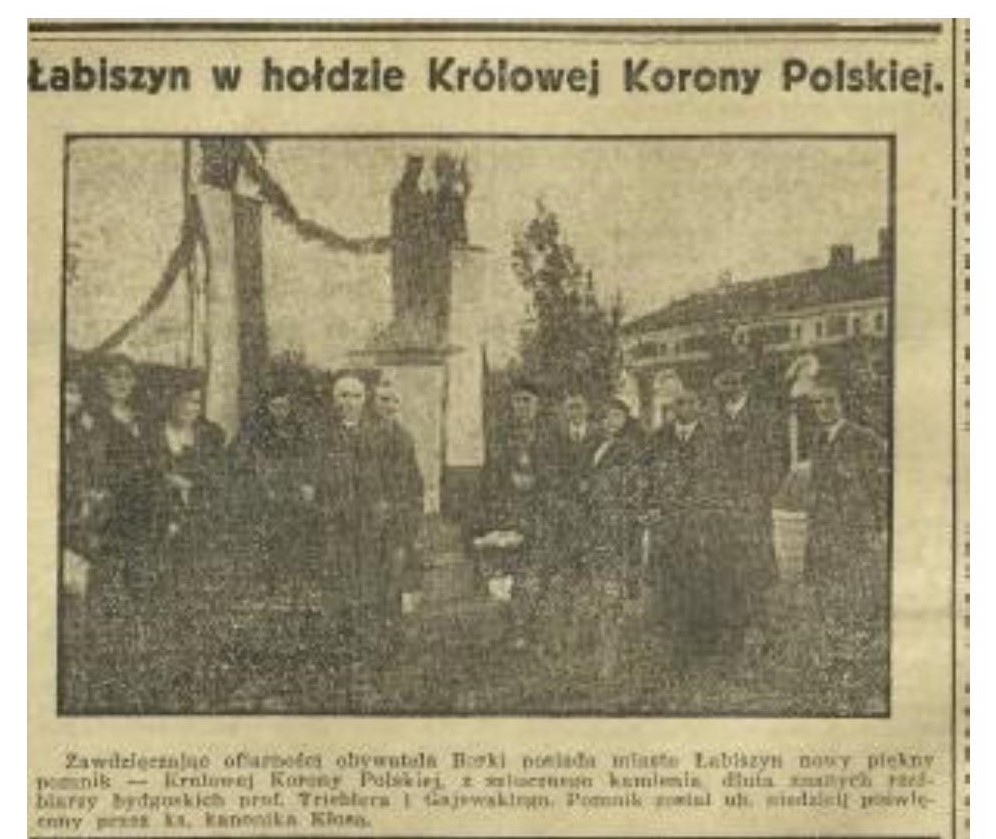
Article reporting the inveiling of the monument in Labiszyn, 1932

- Serca Jezusa (Heart of Jesus) (1932). The figure was 2 metres (6.6 ft) high and stood on a 4 metres (13 ft) pedestal. The cornerstone was laid on March 30, 1930 and the consecration took place on October 2, 1932. On the pedestal was the following inscription: "To the Sacred Heart of Jesus - Bydgoszcz Liberated". Initially located on Poznański Square, after its destruction during WWII, a replica has been unveiled in 2010 on Seminaryjna Street;
- Jesus Cross (1935), a 7.5 metres (25 ft) monumental cross erected in Szwederowo district. The cross was consecrated on May 3, 1935 by Father Jan Konopczyński, rector of the Church of Our Lady of Perpetual Help parish. In the first weeks of the occupation, the monument was demolished by the Germans. In 1992, the monument has been partially rebuilt;
- Monument to the fallen Polish soldiers during WWI in Aubérive, France, for which he received the 1st prize;
- Chłopcy z Fish (Children playing with a fish) (1934), fountain in Szwederowo district;
- tombstone monument to Idzi Świtała (1877-1928), a member of the Chamber of Deputies of the Prussian Sejm at the Nowofarny Cemetery in Bydgoszcz;
- Queen of the Polish crown in Łabiszyn, consecrated in November 1932;
- Sacred Heart of Jesus (1933) in Barcin;
- Monument to the fallen of the Greater Poland uprising (1918–1919) in Inowrocław (non-existent) and in Gniezno.

== Gallery ==
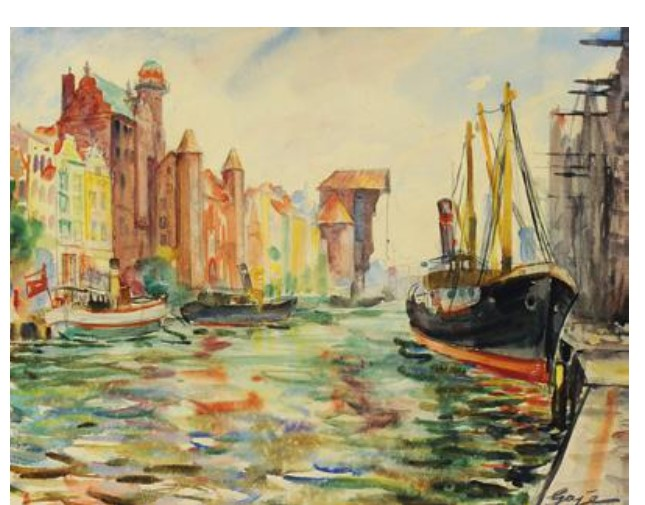
F. Gajewski, Gdańsk, 1934

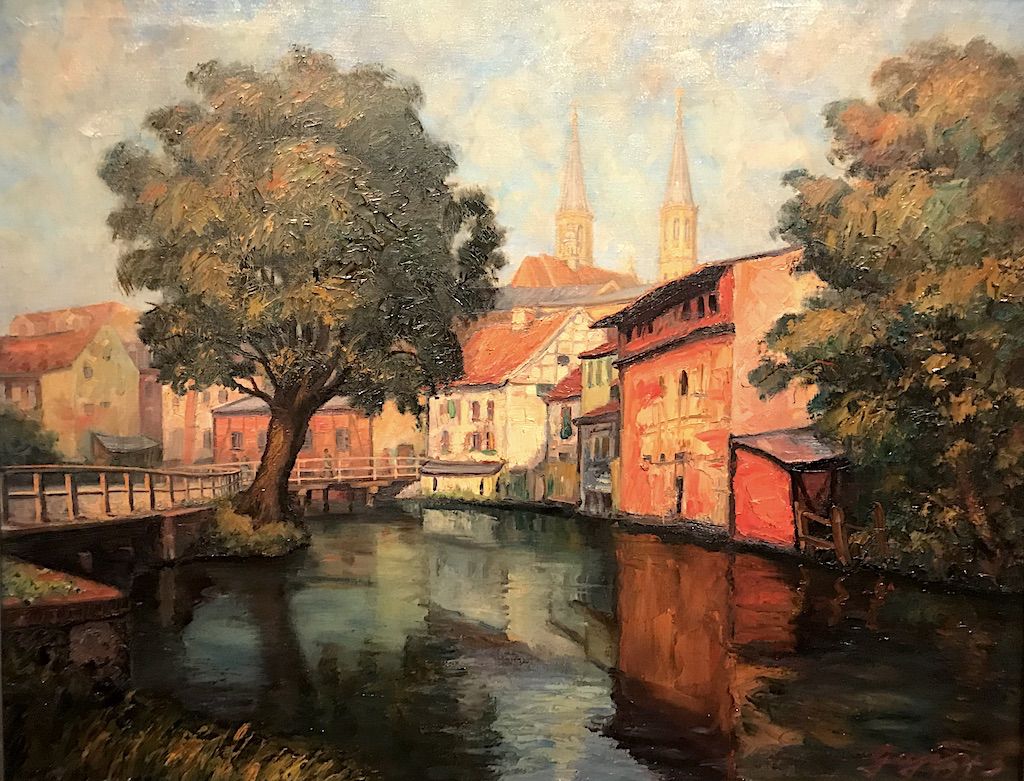
F. Gajewski, Wenecja Bydgoska, 1943

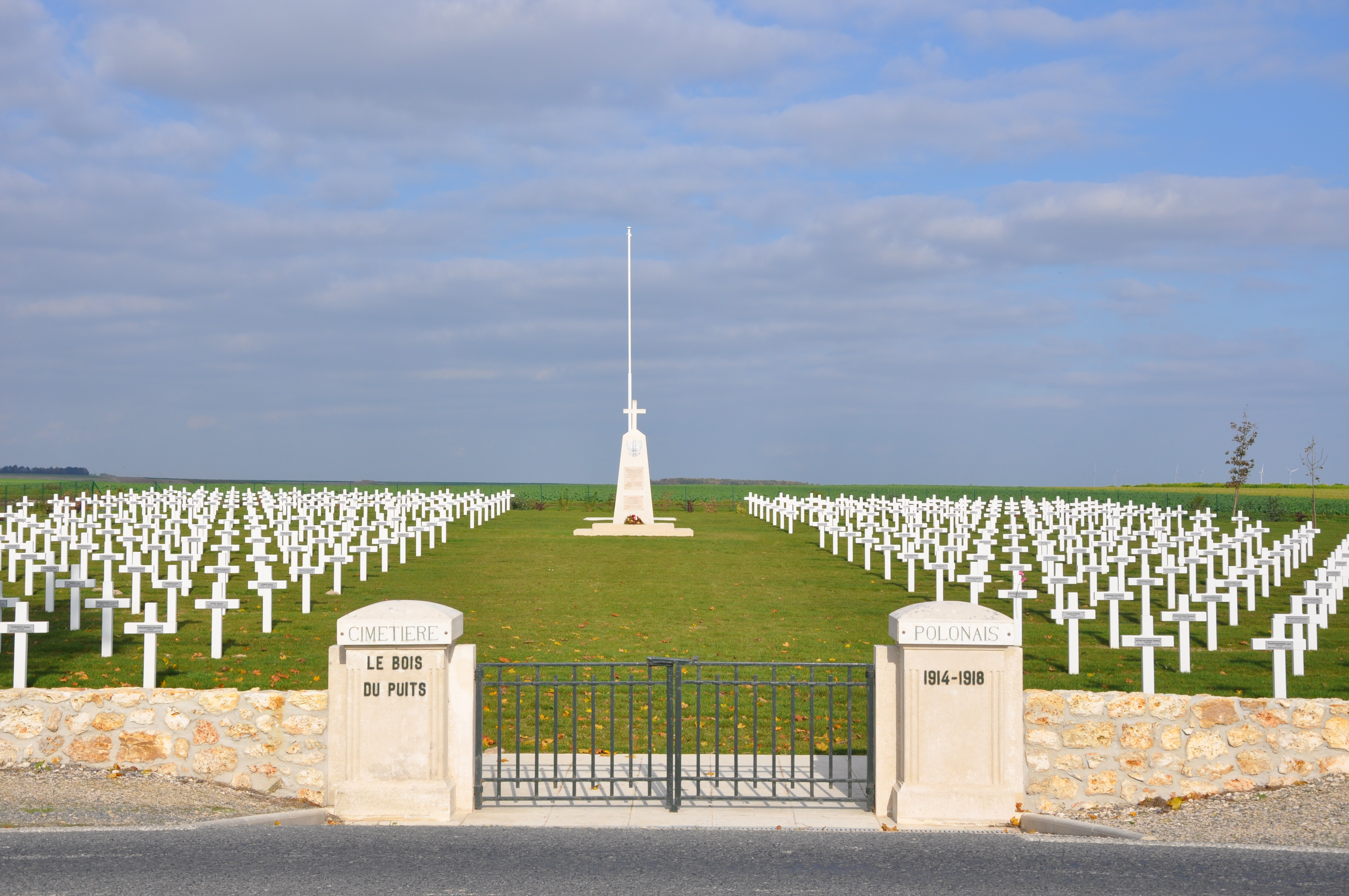
Aubérive, Polish cemetery

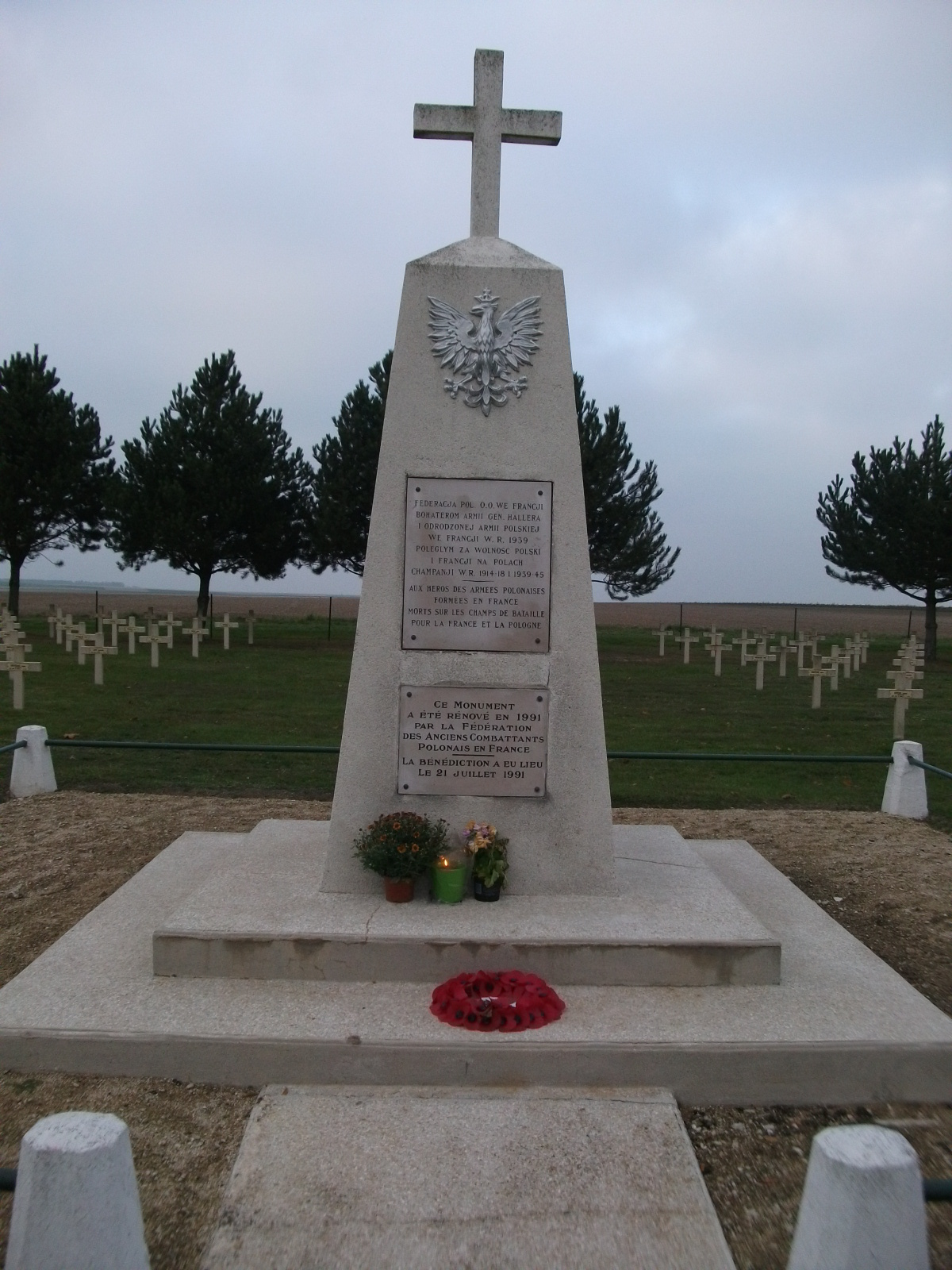
T. Gajewski, Monument at the Polish cemetery

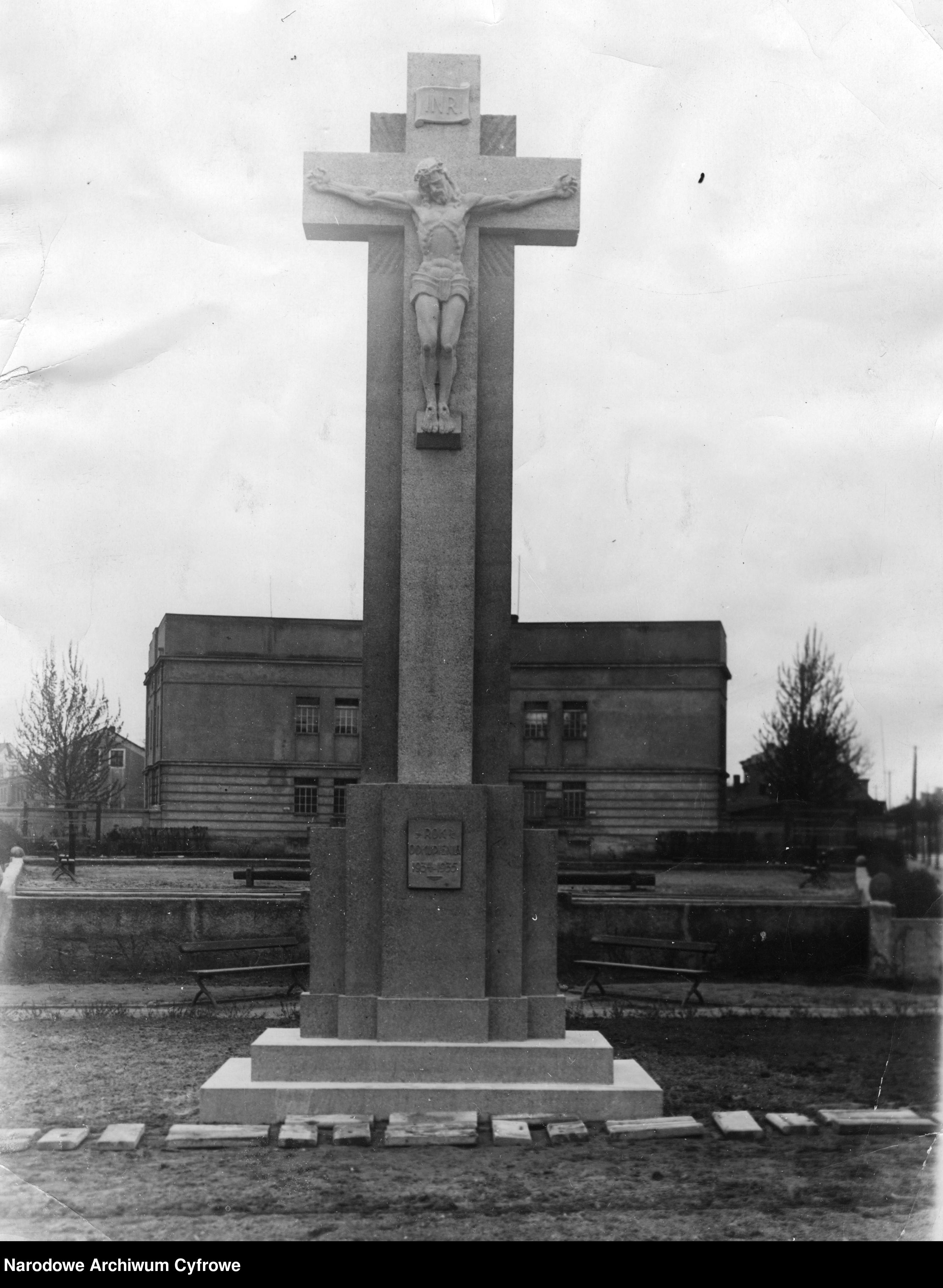
T. Gajewski, Monumental Cross of Jesus, Szwederowo district, Bydgoszcz, 1932

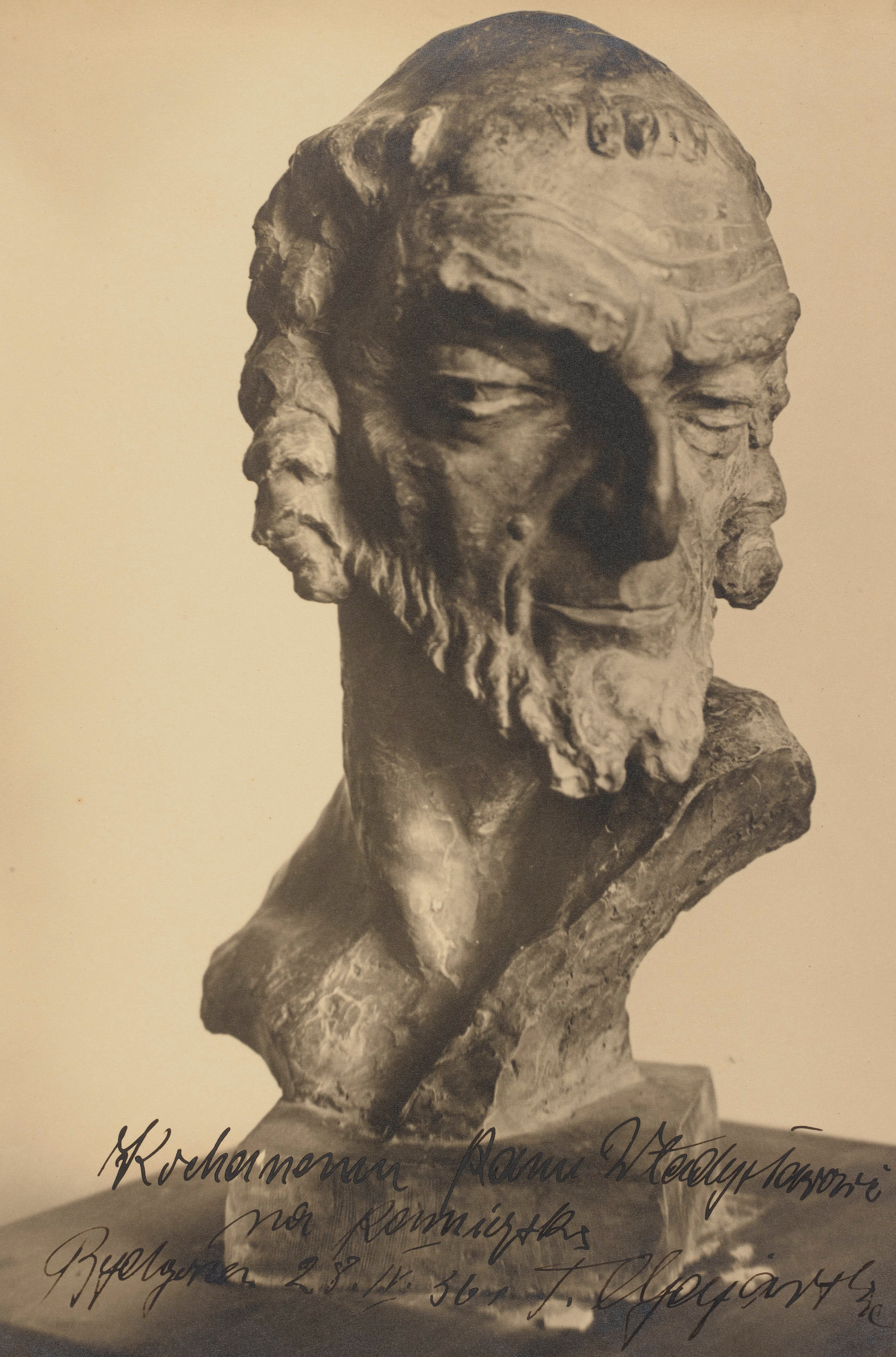
T. Gajewski, Head of Judas

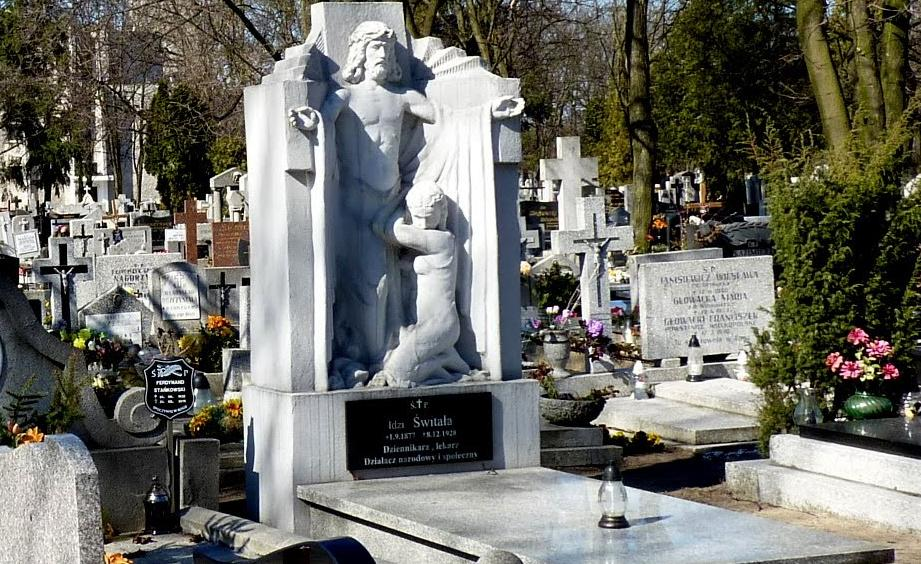
T. Gajewski, Monument to Idzi Świtała

== See also ==
- Bydgoszcz
- Piotr Triebler
- Blue Army (Poland)
- List of Polish people

== Bibliography ==
- (in Polish) Agnieszka Markowska, Paweł Rzekanowski (2017). Stanisław Horno-Popławski. Katalog zbiorów Bydgoskiego Centrum Sztuki. Bydgoszcz: Bydgoski Centrum Sztuki. ISBN 9788365533227.
