= Aubérive =

- Commune
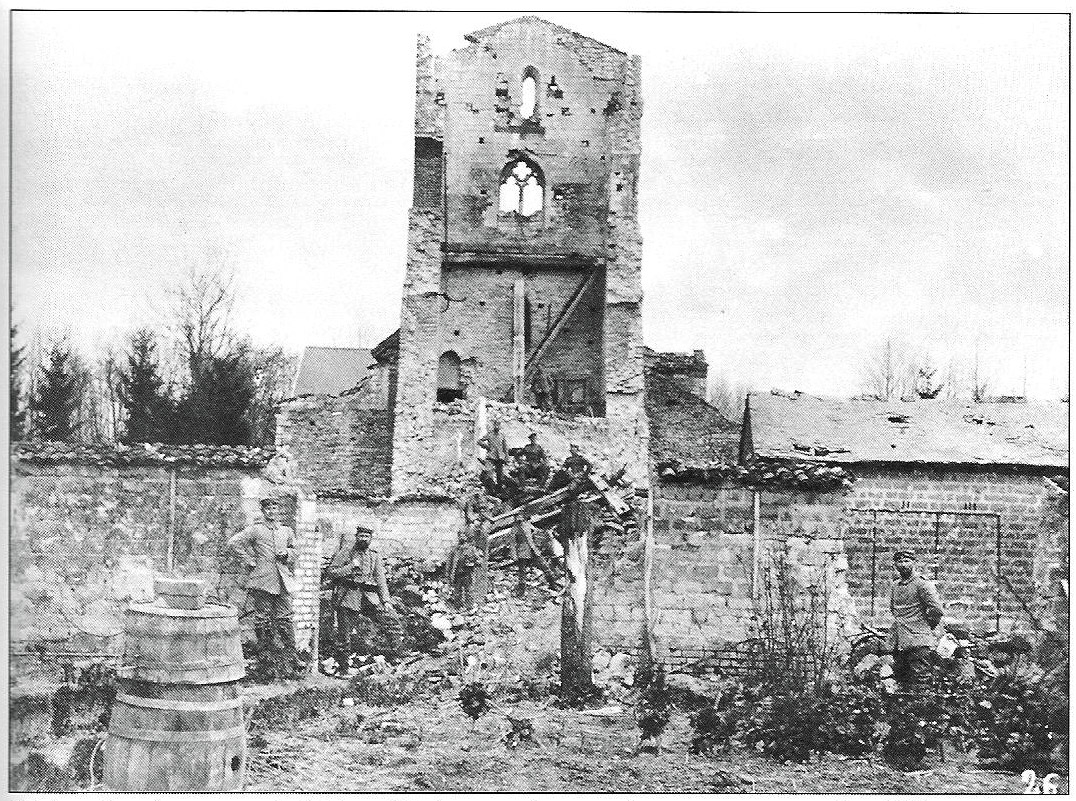
- The war-damaged church in 1915

- Coat of arms
- Location of Aubérive
- Location within France Location within Grand Est
- Coordinates: 49°12′18″N 4°25′02″E
- Country: France
- Region: Grand Est
- Department: Marne
- Arrondissement: Reims
- Canton: Mourmelon-Vesle et Monts de Champagne
- Intercommunality: CU Grand Reims

Government
  - Mayor (2020–2026): Pascal Lorin
- Area^{1}: 27.5 km^{2} (10.6 sq mi)
- Elevation: 113 m (371 ft)
- Population (2023): 241
  - Density: 8.76/km^{2} (22.7/sq mi)
- Time zone: UTC+01:00 (CET)
  - Summer (DST): UTC+02:00 (CEST)
- INSEE/Postal code: 51019 /51600
- ^{1} French Land Register data, which excludes lakes, ponds, glaciers > 1 km^{2} (0.386 sq mi or 247 acres) and river estuaries.

Aubérive (French pronunciation: [obeʁivə]) is a commune in the Marne department in northeastern France.

== Population ==
Historical population
Year	Pop.	±% p.a.
1968	203	—
1975	175	−2.10%
1982	156	−1.63%
1990	157	+0.08%
1999	182	+1.66%
2007	196	+0.93%
2012	228	+3.07%
2017	238	+0.86%
2023	241	+0.21%
Source: INSEE

== Geography ==
The commune is traversed by the Suippe river.

== See also ==
- Communes of the Marne department
