= Seminaryjna Street =

Street in Bydgoszcz, Poland

Coordinates: 53°07′19.6″N 17°59′00.4″E

Seminaryjna street
Bydgoszcz
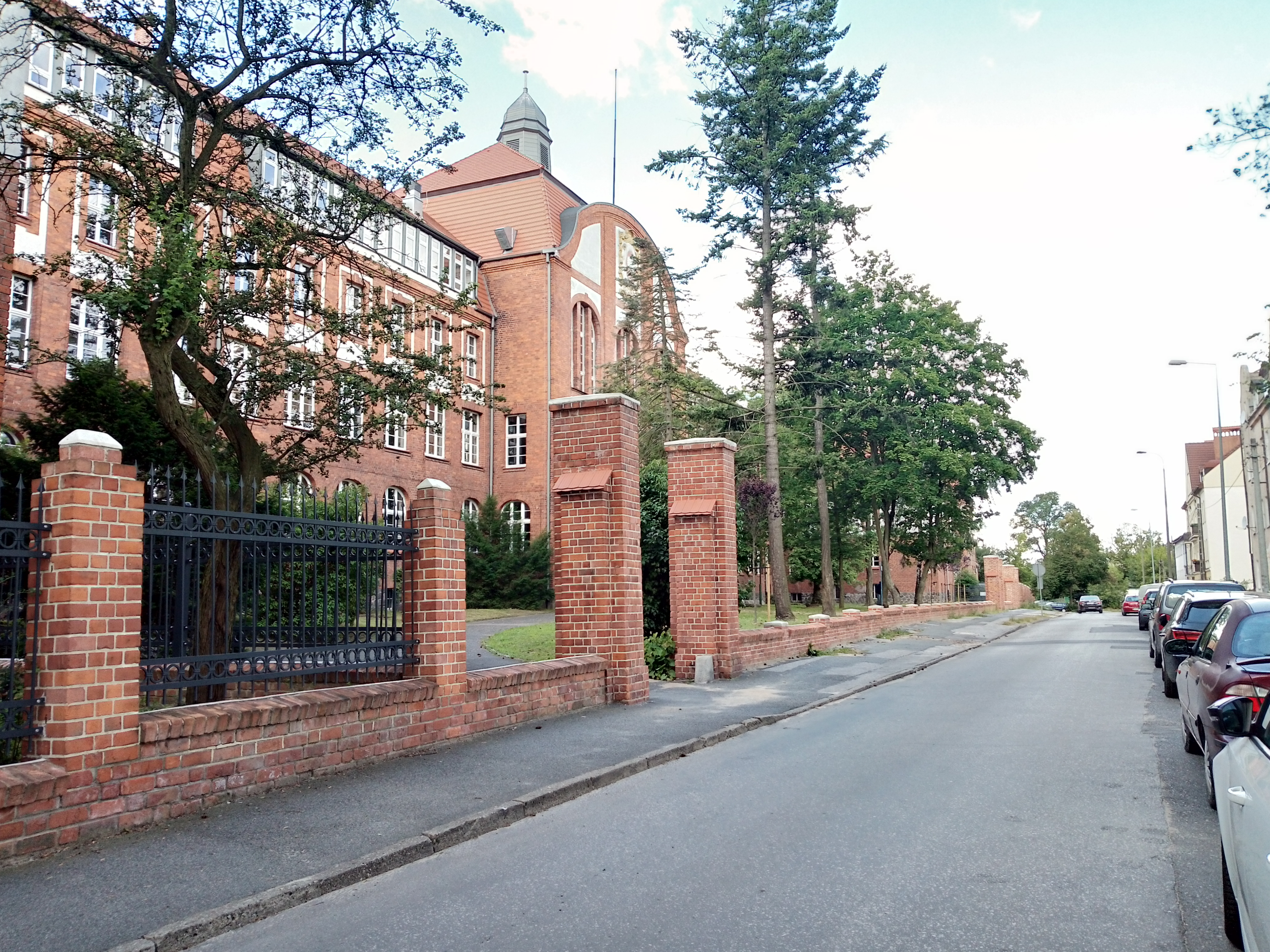
- View of Seminaryjna across Nr. 3
- Interactive map of Seminaryjna street
- Native name: Ulica Seminaryjna w Bydgoszczy (Polish)
- Former names: Naumanns höhe, Naumannshöhe straße
- Namesake: Seminary
- Owner: City of Bydgoszcz
- Length: 450 m (1,480 ft)-Google maps
- Width: ca. 10m
- Area: Wilczak, Błonie, Downtown districts
- Location: Bydgoszcz, Poland

Construction
- Construction start: Late 1870s

Seminaryjna street is located between Wilczak, Błonie, Downtown districts in Bydgoszcz, Poland. Laid in the late 1870s, its winding path offer a view on the old town nested down in the Brda river. Many frontages and edifices display architectural and historic interests, one of them is registered on the Kuyavian-Pomeranian Voivodeship Heritage List.

== Location ==
Seminaryjna street is a path linking the low-downtown part of the city to the southern heights overlooking the valley. It stems from the original Plac Poznański and winds its way along the edge of the hill up to the low-altitude urban plateau.

== History ==
The road appears on a 1857 map, without naming: it follows the actual path and linked at the time down-town to the shooting range (German: schießstände) and the exercise area (German: Exercier Platz der Königl. IV Division) of the 3rd Neumark Cavalry Grenadier (Dragoon) regiment "Freiherr von Derfflinger" of the 4th Royal Cavalry Brigade.

Seminaryjna street is first registered on the 1908 Bromberg's Address book, as Naumanns Höhe (English: Naumanns Heights). The name referred to Johann Gottlieb August Naumann, who was president of the Bromberg region of the Province of Posen from 1864 to 1870. At the time, only the catholic seminary (today's building at Nr.3) was identified in the street. The other and much older edifice, the Deaconesses House (German: Diakonissenhaus) -today's clinic at Nr.1-, was registered at 1 Schubiner straße (today's Szubińska street).

After an administrative reorganization of the street mapping, the Diakonissenhaus moved to Naumanns Höhe in 1915, while most of the buildings still standing nowadays were already completed.

Through history, the street bore the following names:

- From inception in the 1870s to 1920, Naumanns höhe;
- 1920–1939, Ulica Seminaryjna;
- 1939–1945, Naumannshöhe straße;
- since 1945, Ulica Seminaryjna.

Seminaryjna street refers to the first edifice listed in the avenue, the catholic seminary at Nr.3.

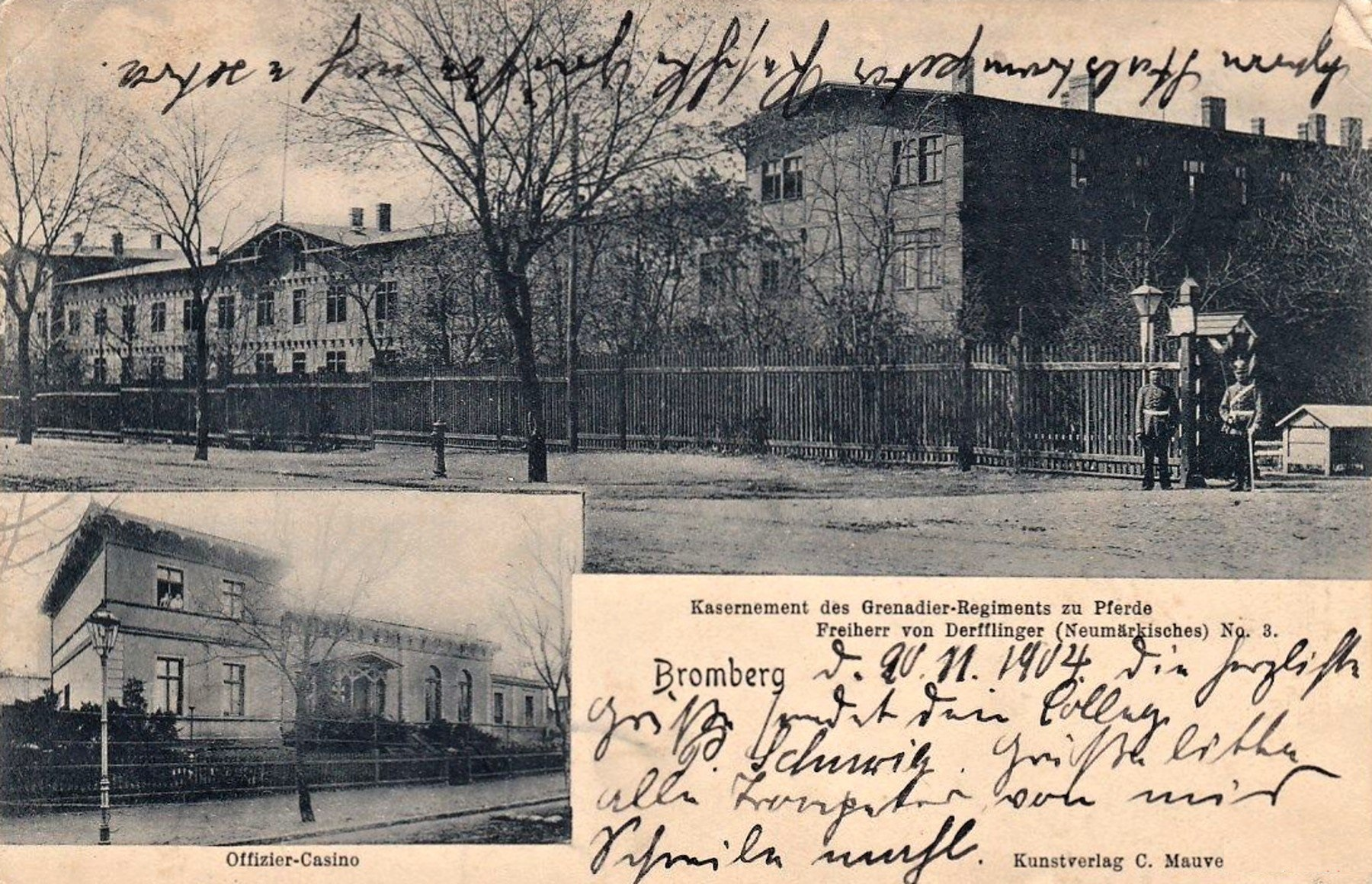
1913 postcard of the 3rd Dragoon's barrack in Bromberg

== Main areas and edifices ==
=== Kujawsko-Pomorskie pulmonary care hospital at 1 ===
The hospital is one of the oldest in Bydgoszcz: it was established on December 9, 1885, with funds donated by Luiza Gisse-Rafalska - the owner of a large estate in Rupienica, today's Wzgórze Wolności district, with the proviso that deaconess sisters from the nearby Evangelical Church would take care of the patients. The 1 hectare (2.5 acres) terrain for the construction of the hospital was handed out by municipal authorities. Luiza Gisse-Rafalska also funded a caring facility for elders at 1, Szubińska street, today's Building of the Army Recruiting Command.

The design of the edifice was realized by a city counselor for buildings, Wilhelm Lincke. The new institution comprised 40 beds distributed in two departments, surgical and internal. In 1900, the facility expanded to 68 beds and in 1902, an additional building housing 25 beds for contagious patients was erected contiguously, with funds from German donors and city authorities.

At the rise of the Second Polish Republic, the institution fall under the responsibility of Bydgoszcz mayor. In 1925, the 90-bed hospital was managed by 3 doctors, 14 deaconess sisters and 2 nurses. In 1926, a new 30-bed pavilion was built in the vicinity, dedicated for patients with Typhoid fever, Scarlet fever, Influenza and STIs. In 1938, the hospital housed 128 beds.

During the nazi occupation, the establishment was used for Wehrmacht soldiers. After WWII, since the main building was still occupied as a military facility, the hospital was reorganized for a few months around two barracks by Dr. Władysław Baranowski, head of the city health department. In 1949, the infectious diseases ward was moved to the Hospital for Infectious Diseases at 10 Świętego Floriana Street and the institution transformed into the Municipal Pulmonary Hospital: with 144 beds, Władysław Baranowski was raised to the position of director.

In 1953, the hospital was named after Dr. Alfred Sokołowski, a pioneer in studying and treating tuberculosis in Poland. In 1954, Władysław Baranowski unsuccessfully requested the clinic to expand to the neighboring building of the Seminary at Nr.3. In 1959, the barracks were razed and the erection of a modern extension to the historic building started. During the works, which lasted till 1964, patients were received with difficulties in an edifice at Stawowa street. In 1975, a branch of the Pulmonology faculty of the Medical University of Gdańsk was housed there: it became in 1985 the new Medical University in Bydgoszcz. At that time, the medical ensemble encompassed three facilities:

- the Provincial Tuberculosis and Lung Diseases Clinic at 11 Gimnazjalna street;
- the Alfred Sokołowski Provincial Pulmonary Hospital at 1 Seminaryjna street;
- the tuberculosis Sanatorium in the northern district of Smukała.

In 1992, the foundation took the name of Provincial Hospital of Tuberculosis and Lung Diseases. In 2000, the hospital received the direction of the Smukała sanatorium and moved there the Tuberculosis Treatment Department, together with the Rehabilitation Department and the Tuberculosis and Lung Diseases Department (in 2004). In 2003, the institution changed its name to Kujawsko-Pomorskie Pulmonology Centre in Bydgoszcz. In 2020, Bydgoszcz authorities announced further investments in the centre, in particular to erect additional building extensions.

The historic building displays historicist red brick facades, leaning to Neo-gothic forms: many other instances of this architecture can be found in the city (Main Post Office building, 18 Grodzka Street, 10/18 Świętego Floriana Street). The multi-storey edifice comprised two rectangular-shape buildings, linked by the extension of the right side gabled wing. One can appreciate avant-corps turrets or pointed arches portals still bearing the Christian cross as a remembrance of the religious origin of the clinic.

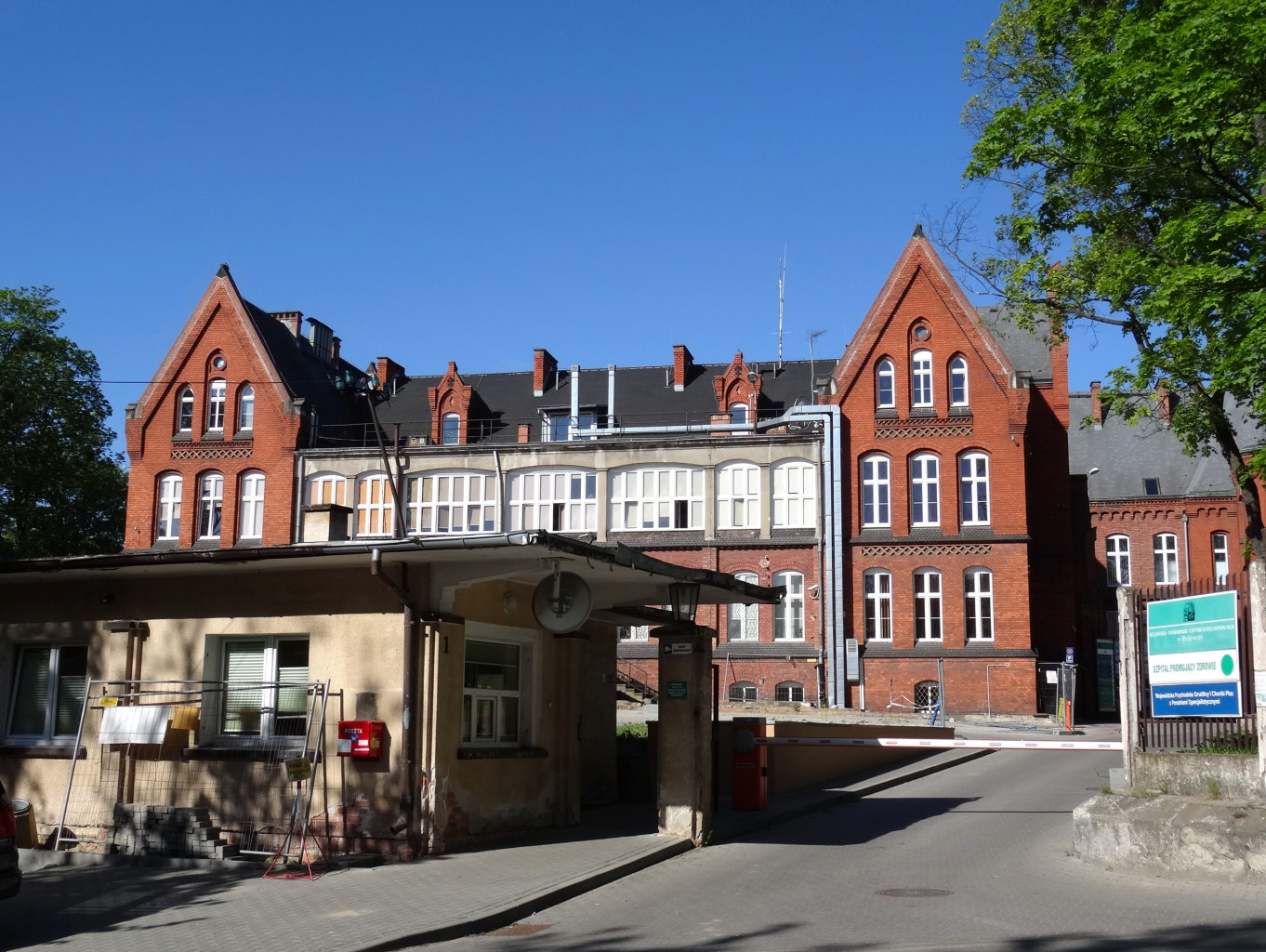
View from the street

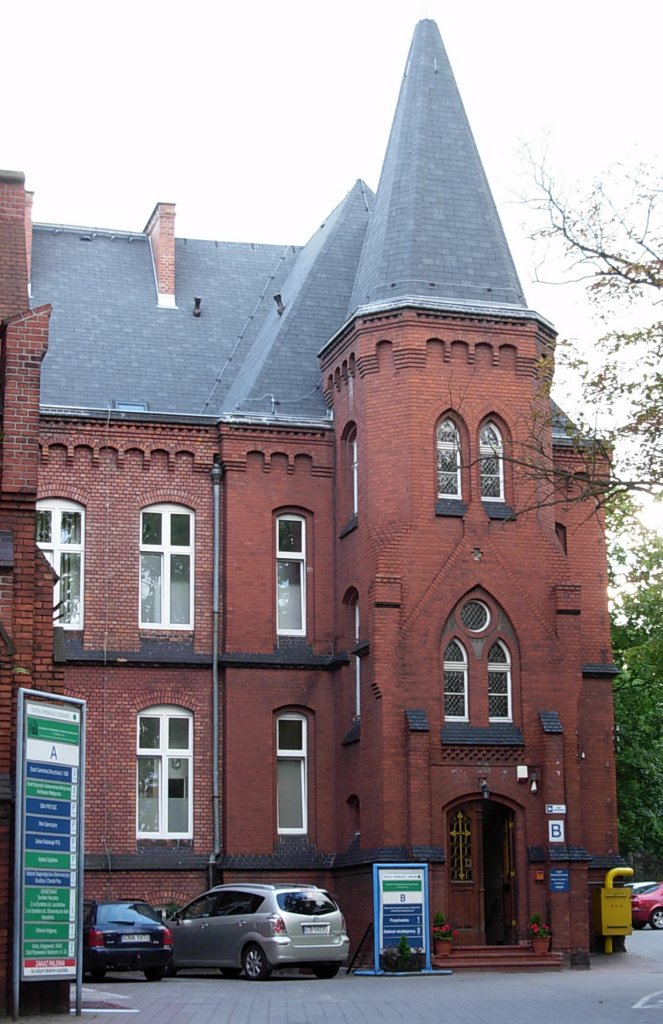
Detail of a wing

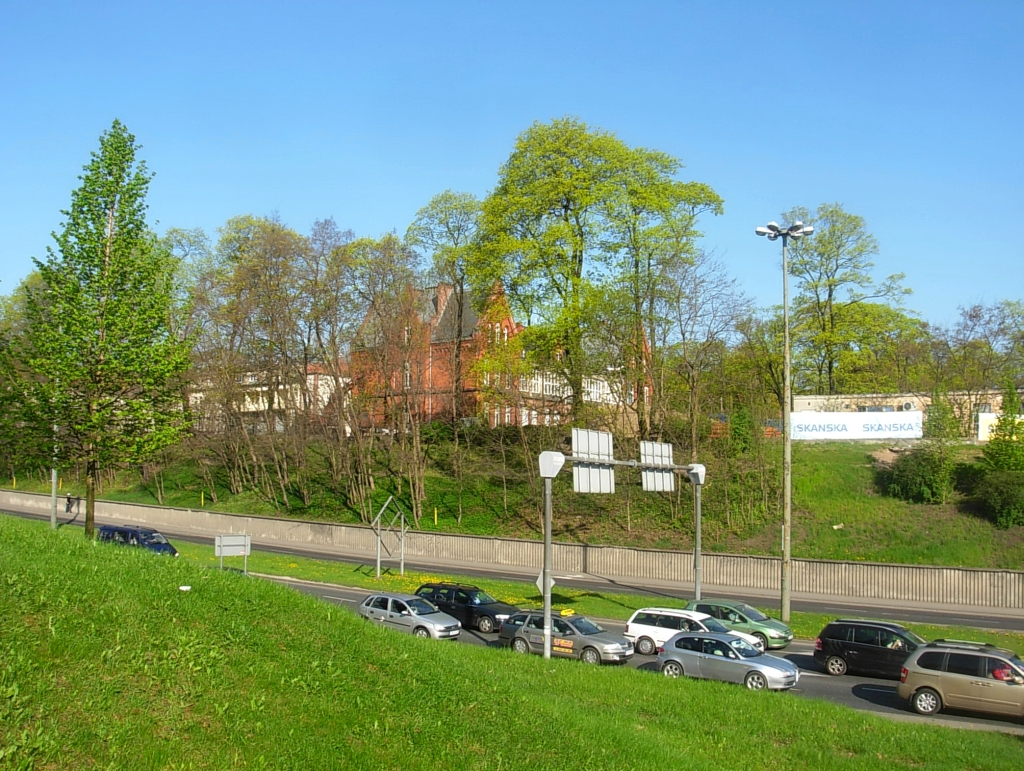
View from Szwederowo, with Szubińska street on the foreground

=== Statue of the Sacred Heart of Jesus ===
The original statue has been realized in the early 1930s by Teodor Gajewski and Piotr Triebler. The former was the author of the monumental cross in Szwederowo district (1935). The latter, more fertile, created among others, the statue of Tadeusz Kościuszko (on the facade at 2 Królowej Jadwigi Street), the statue of Mary standing outside the Church of the Holy Trinity or the sculpture of Louise de Marillac in Saint Vincent de Paul Basilica.

Their artwork was made of white sandstone of Szydłowiec, it stood on a foundation stone laid on March 30, 1930: the monument was 6 metres (20 ft) high, the figure itself 2.2 metres (7.2 ft) tall. Official consecration happened on October 2, 1932, by Kazimierz Stepczyński, then parish priest at the Church of the Sacred Heart of Jesus located downtown.

On the plinthe, the following inscription was carved:

Najświętszemu Sercu Jezusa
Bydgoszcz wyzwolona

(in English) Sacred Heart of Jesus
Bydgoszcz Liberated

On November 7, 1939, the monument was demolished by Nazi armed forces. In September 1945, an oak cross standing on a concrete base was set up on the very place where the statue used to be. In 1987, the rebuilding of Poznański square required to move up the cross to Seminaryjna street, close to the pulmonary care hospital.

In the late 2000s, the idea to re-create the original statue took off: the project was finalised in 2010. The official unveiling ceremony was carried out on June 24, 2010, chaired by the president of Bydgoszcz. The new sculpture, replicating the original one, was realized by Marek Rona, a local artist.

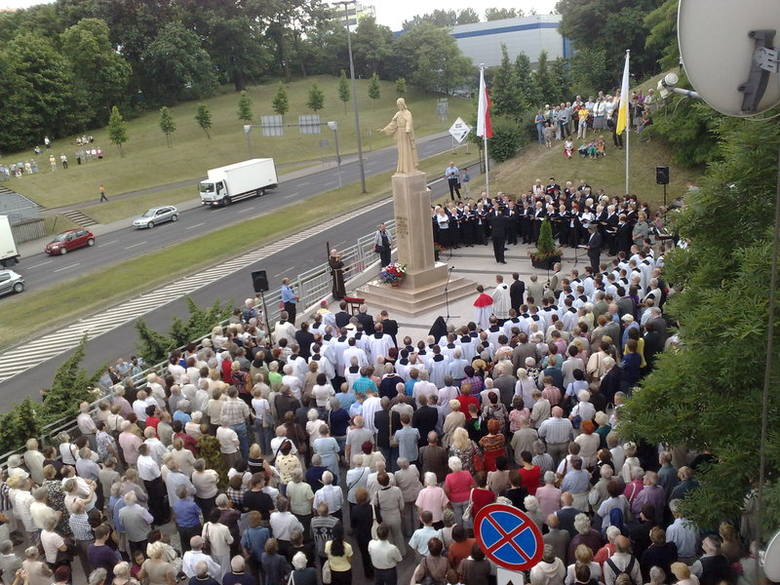
Inauguration ceremony

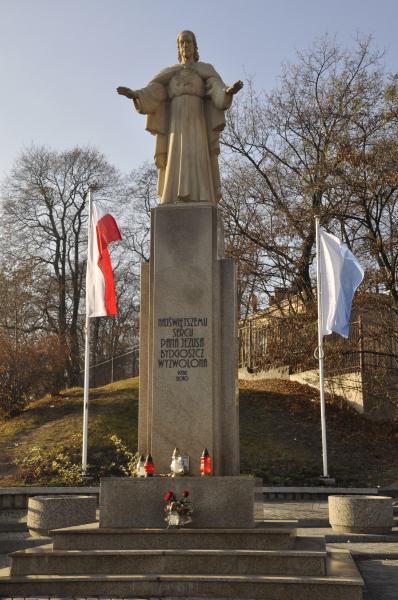
The new statue

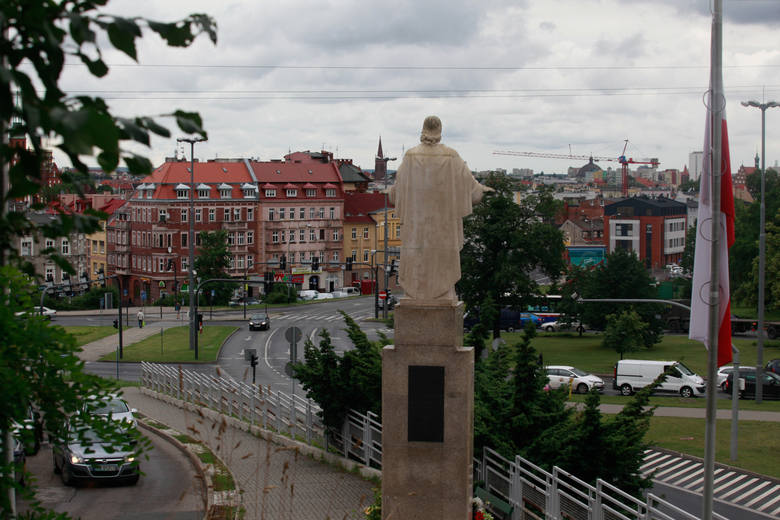
Back view, overlooking Poznański square

=== Tenement at 2, corner with Lubelska street ===
1910

Eclecticism

Located at the corner with another street, the tenement was initially at registered Prinzenhöhe straße and not Naumanns Höhe straße. Hence the first landlord, Gustav Kott, lived at 1, Prinzenhöhe straße. In 1910, the address shifted to 15, Naumanns Höhe straße.

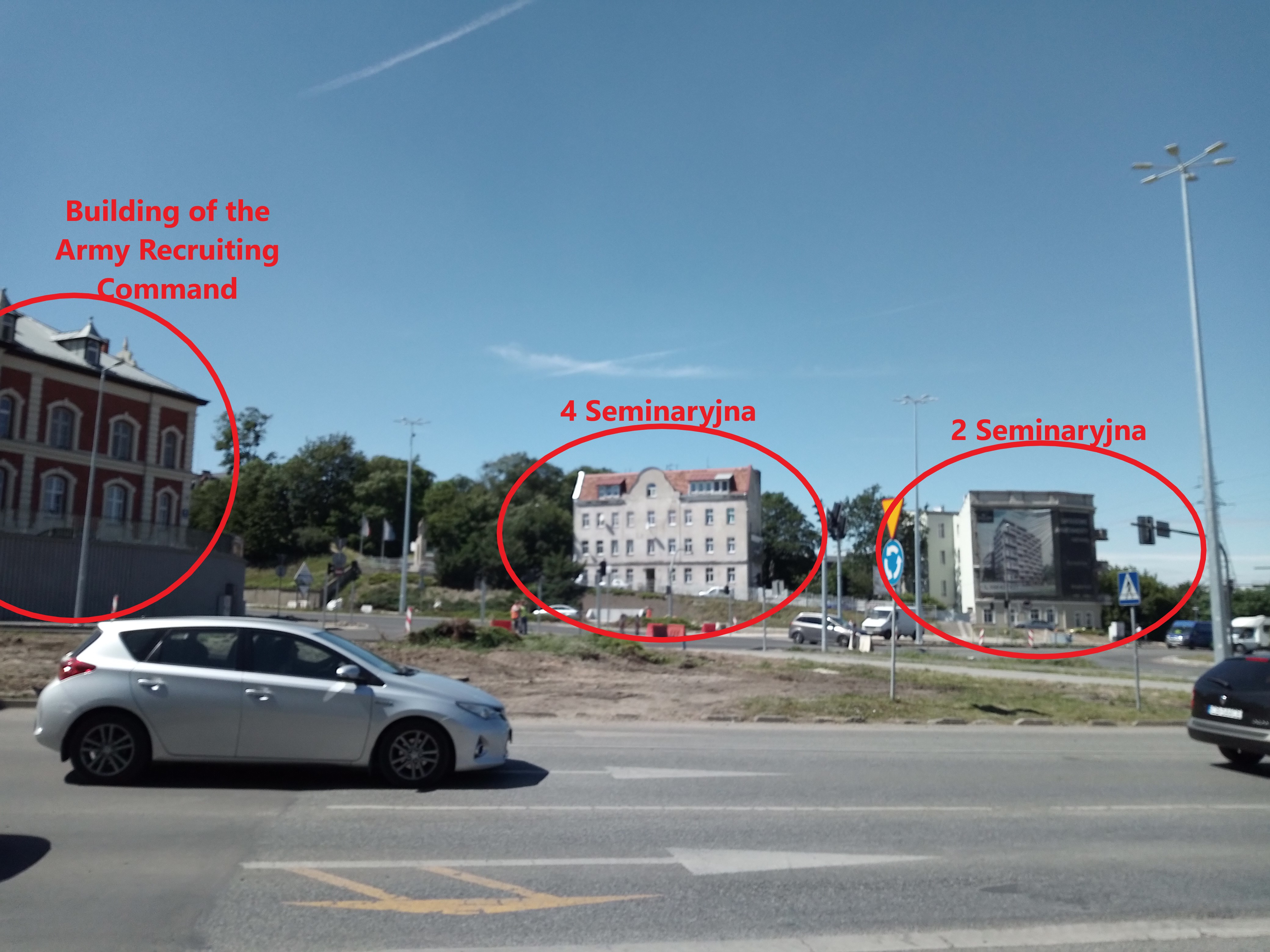
View from Poznański square of tenements at Nr.2 and 4

=== Ancient seminary building at 3/5/7 ===
Registered on Kuyavian-Pomeranian Voivodeship Heritage List, Nr.601400 A/809/1-2 September 30, 1992

The building was erected from 1905 to 1907 for the Teachers Catholic Seminary, as one of the state secondary schools in Bromberg. The project was designed by the architect Lehwesse and carried out by building inspector Heumann. The seminary was established in 1907 with state funds, comprising a training and preparation school to enter the institution. Although a Catholic religious organisation in German language, it welcomed Germans as well as Poles.

At the start of the Second Polish Republic, on January 20, 1920, the seminary was taken over from the German hands: in January 1920, a first exam in Polish was conducted and the 73 successful students composed the first 5 seminar classes of the Polish era. The school building provided a boarding house for non-local students at the school and a residential house for teachers. Studies at the seminary lasted 5 years and fees were charged; the curriculum included general education topics, similar in scope to lower secondary school education, and basic pedagogical subjects. Artistic and technical themes (music, singing, drawings, handicraft) were also quite widely covered: an exercise school accepted students for apprenticeships and was accessible to all children. The institution was housing around 200-250 seminarians at the same time: during its existence, the school graduated 449 students, mostly from petty-bourgeois and rural extraction. The seminary ceased its activities following the 1932 education reform. The edifice first harboured a private gymnasium of the Polish School Society (Polish: Polskie Towarzystwo Szkolne) but in September 1938, a State Pedagogical Secondary School took over, admitting 26 students on the first grade. Be there as it may, the school development was interrupted by the outset of WWII the following year.

During Nazi occupation the school building was periodically occupied by military units. The relief of the Polish eagle hanging above the main entrance was hammered down. In 1943, a Women's Teachers' Seminary was installed in the building, as part of the Germanisation policy: during school year 1943–1944, 230 girls attended such a program.

After the end of World War II, the organisation resumed its operation as State Pedagogical Secondary School, but initially from another facility: on September 1, 1945, lessons were located at 22 Gdańska street and moved back to Seminaryjna on September 1, 1946. The ground floor was occupied by the exercise School, the first floor was devoted to high school classes and the second floor harboured an auditorium and a dormitory, enlarged in the 1950s beneath the attic. In 1951, a commemorative plaque was placed inside the building in memory of 5 teachers murdered during Nazi occupation. From 1950 to 1954, school headmaster was Ludwik Bandura, later rector of the University of Gdańsk. The activity slowly declined, to cease definitely in 1964. Since 1945, the institution had educated 1384 graduates, among whom was Edmund Trempała, later rector of Kazimierz Wielki University in Bydgoszcz.

In 1967, municipal authorities took charge of the building, handing it over to the Engineering Colledge of Bydgoszcz (Polish: Wyższa Szkoła Inżynierska) which housed there the Faculty of Chemical Technology and the university main library. In 1974, the Engineering Colledge merged with the Bydgoszcz branch of the Agricultural Academy of Poznań and changed its name to University of Technology and Agriculture. In 2006, it was renamed Jan & Jędrzej Śniadecki University of Technology and Life Sciences. In 1978, the main library left Seminaryjna Street to move to a more recent facility in Fordon district.

The three-storey building displays historicist style. Its footprint is an elongated rectangle, with a middle avant-corps at the front and side wings. Most of the complex parts are equipped with a basement, a gym area occupies the eastern wing. The buildings have all a Mansard roof. The main entrance portrays an arch, as well as three openings at the third floor. Above the middle window stands a cartouche bearing 1907, the inauguration date. A renovation of the building started in 2016: during the works, in April 2017, several documents from 1906 were found: newspapers (Ilustrierte Zeitung fur Blechindustrie), leaflets, a letter and a business card.

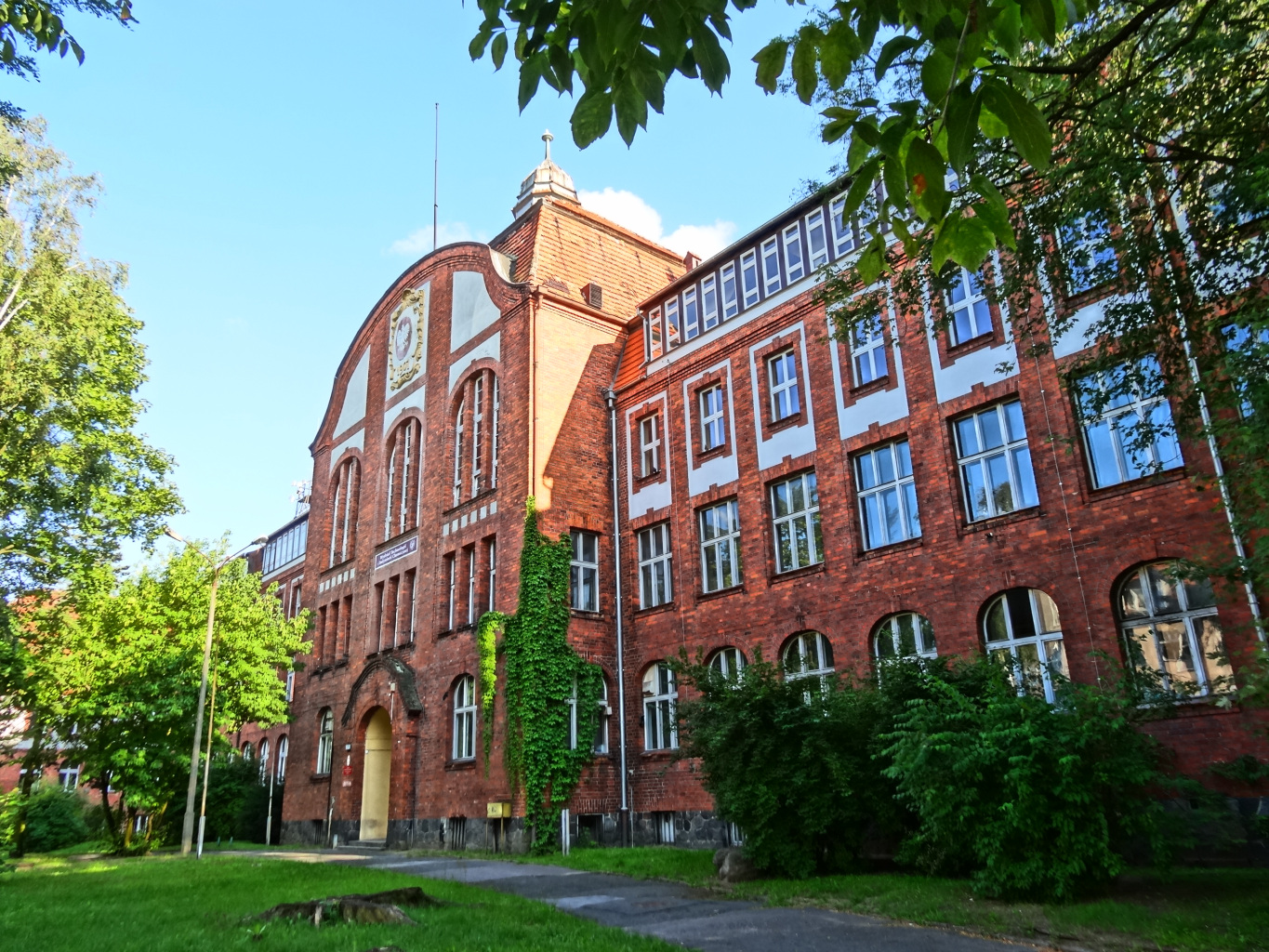
Main frontage on the street

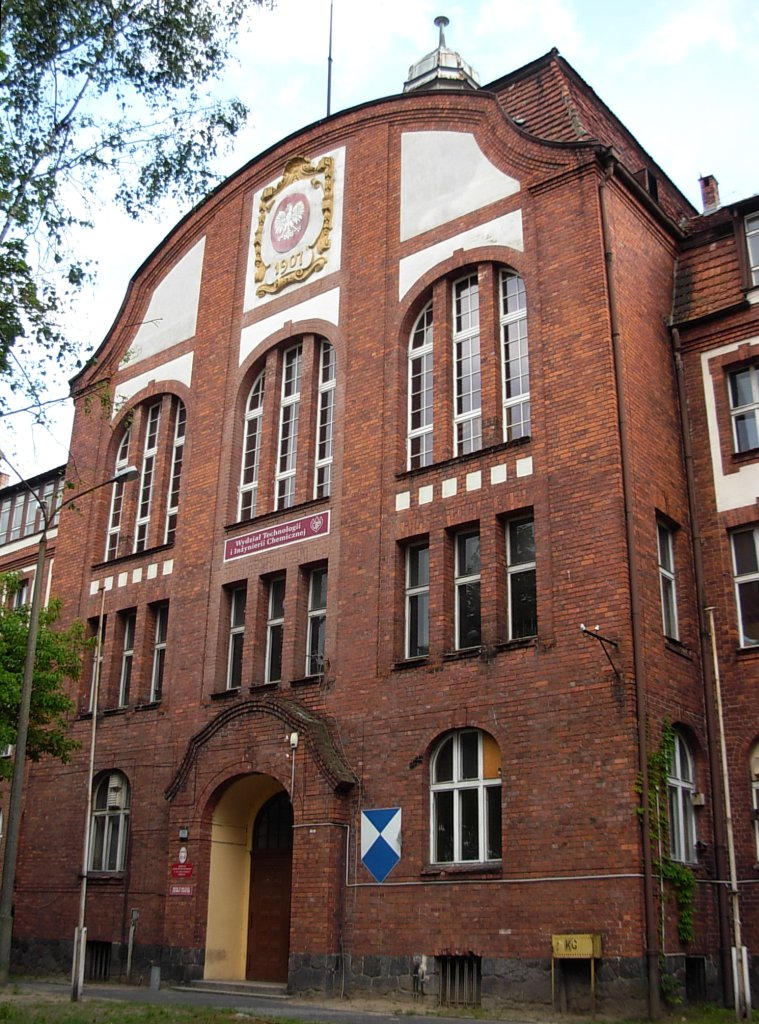
Main avant-corps

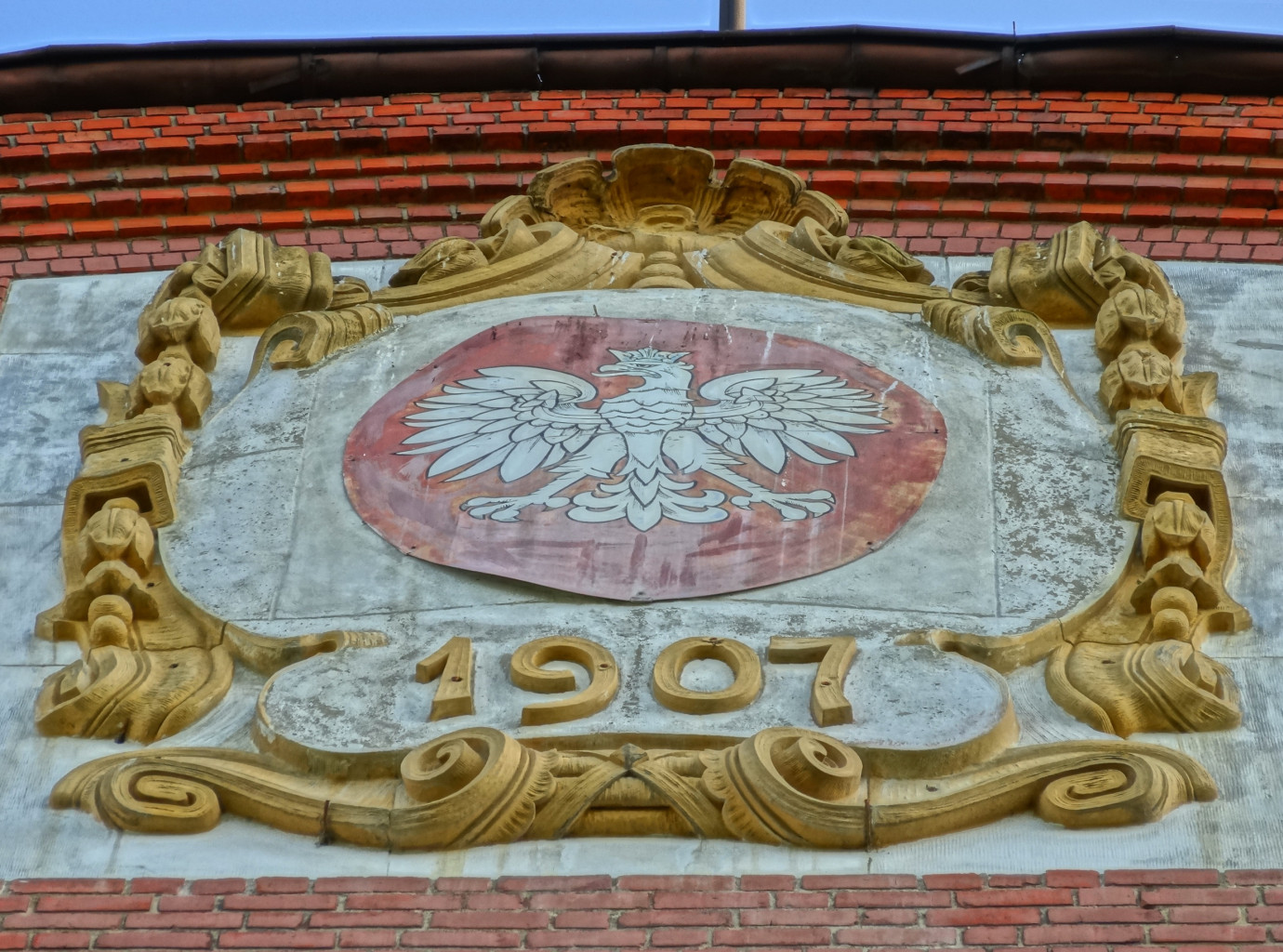
1907 cartouche with Polish coat of arms

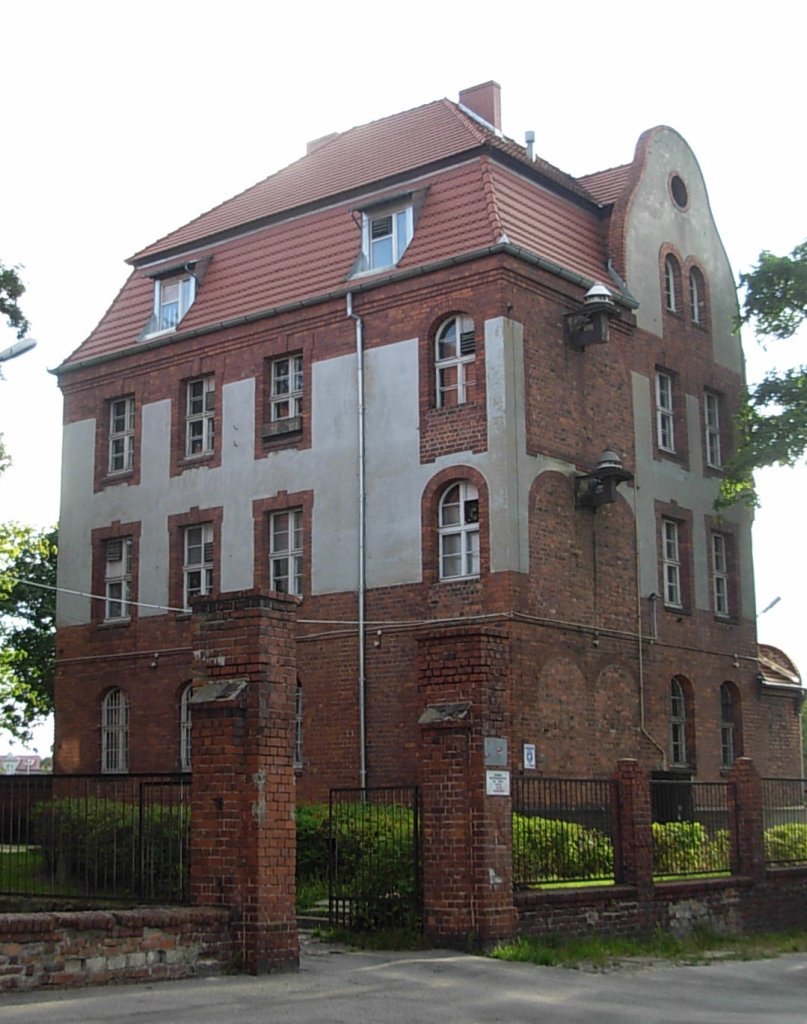
Additional building for lodgings

=== Tenement at 4 ===
1908

Eclecticism

The building was first registered at 1a Prinzenhöhe straße. The first landlord at this address was Rudolf Fredrich in 1908. Like Nr.2, the edifice changed its registration in 1910, to 14 Naumanns Höhe straße.

The neighbouring area at Nr.6, still untouched, has never been built.

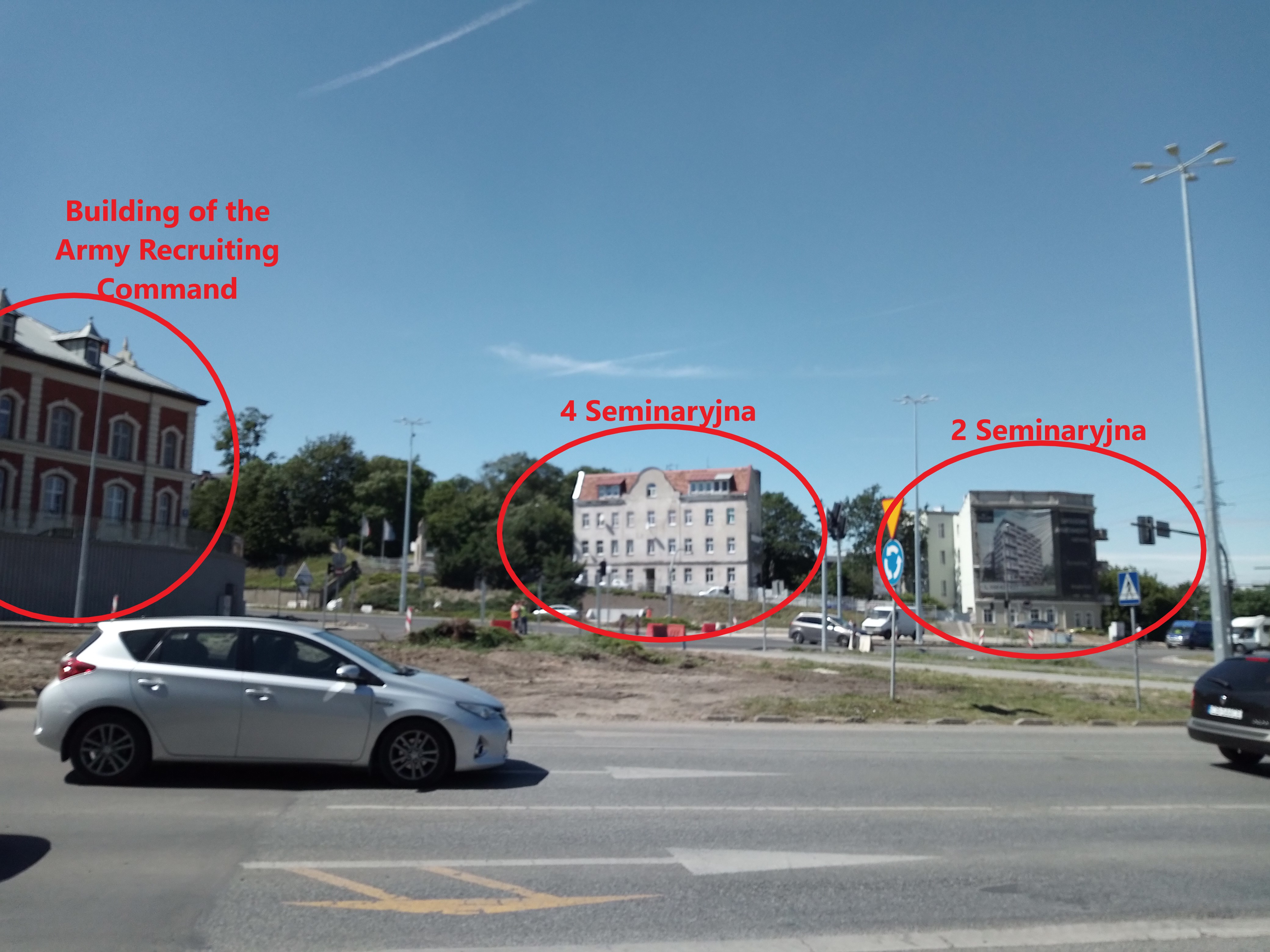
View from Poznański square of tenements at Nr.2 and 4

=== Tenement at 8 ===
1910

Eclecticism

The first landlord was Stephan Sarnowski, registered as a journeyman blacksmith, who lived at the contiguous Prinzenhöhe straße. After 1910, Sarnowski moved to the tenement he owned and stayed there at least till 1933. Located on the ridge of the hill, the southern elevation of this building faces downtown district and the valley of the Brda river.

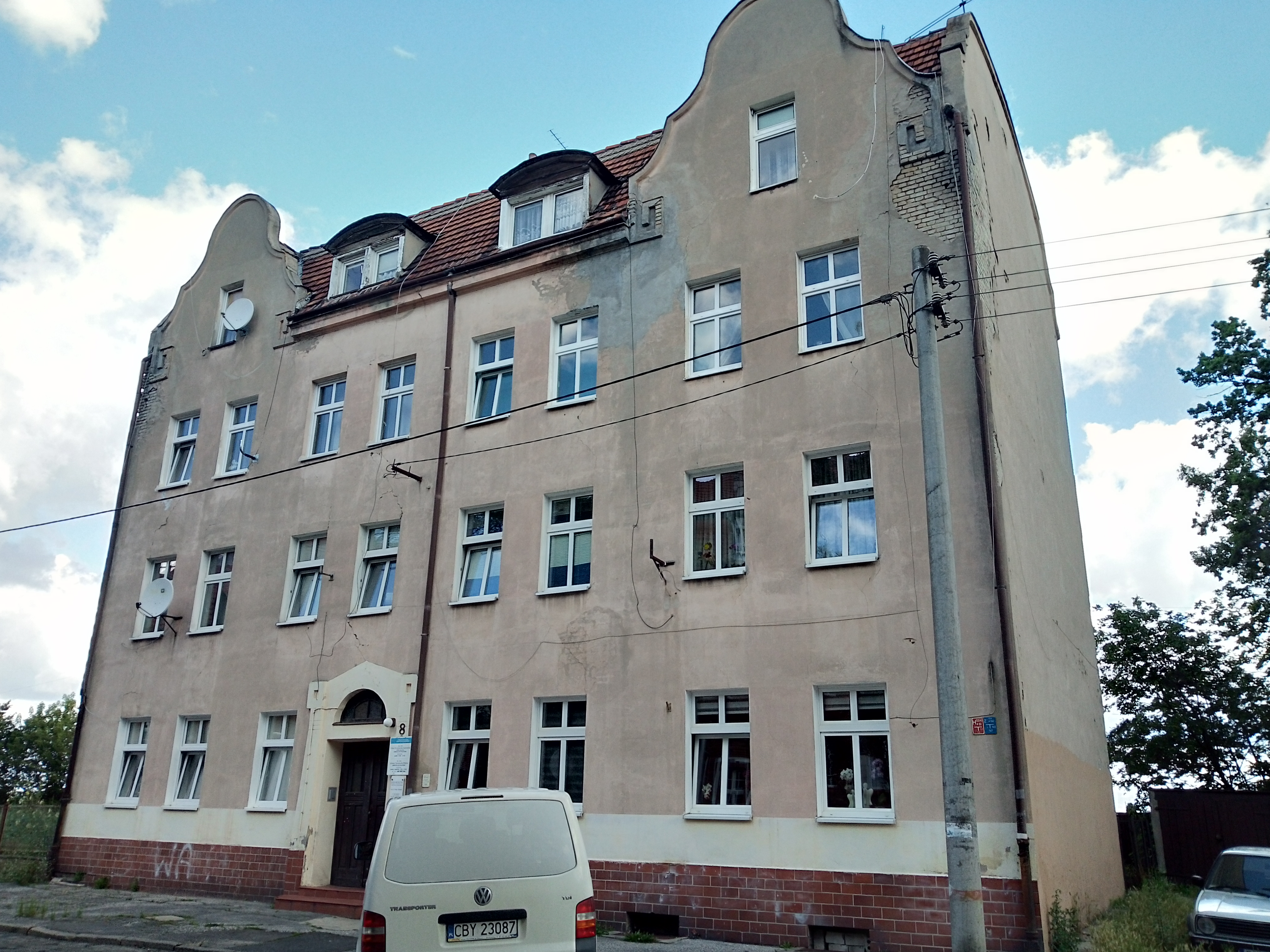
View of the northern facade from the street

=== Tenements at 12 and 14 ===
1910

These two buildings, together with the one at Nr.10 (today non-existent), had a sole landlord, Alexander Grylewicz, a blacksmith. Their address under Prussian rule was 8/9 Naumanns Höhe straße. After WWI, Grylewicz is registered in 1925 as an "invalid person", living in Bielicka street in Szwederowo district. Both edifices turn their southern frontage towards downtown district.

Only the tenement at Nr.12 kept architectural traits. Early modernist features can be noticed on the facade, following a recent restoration.

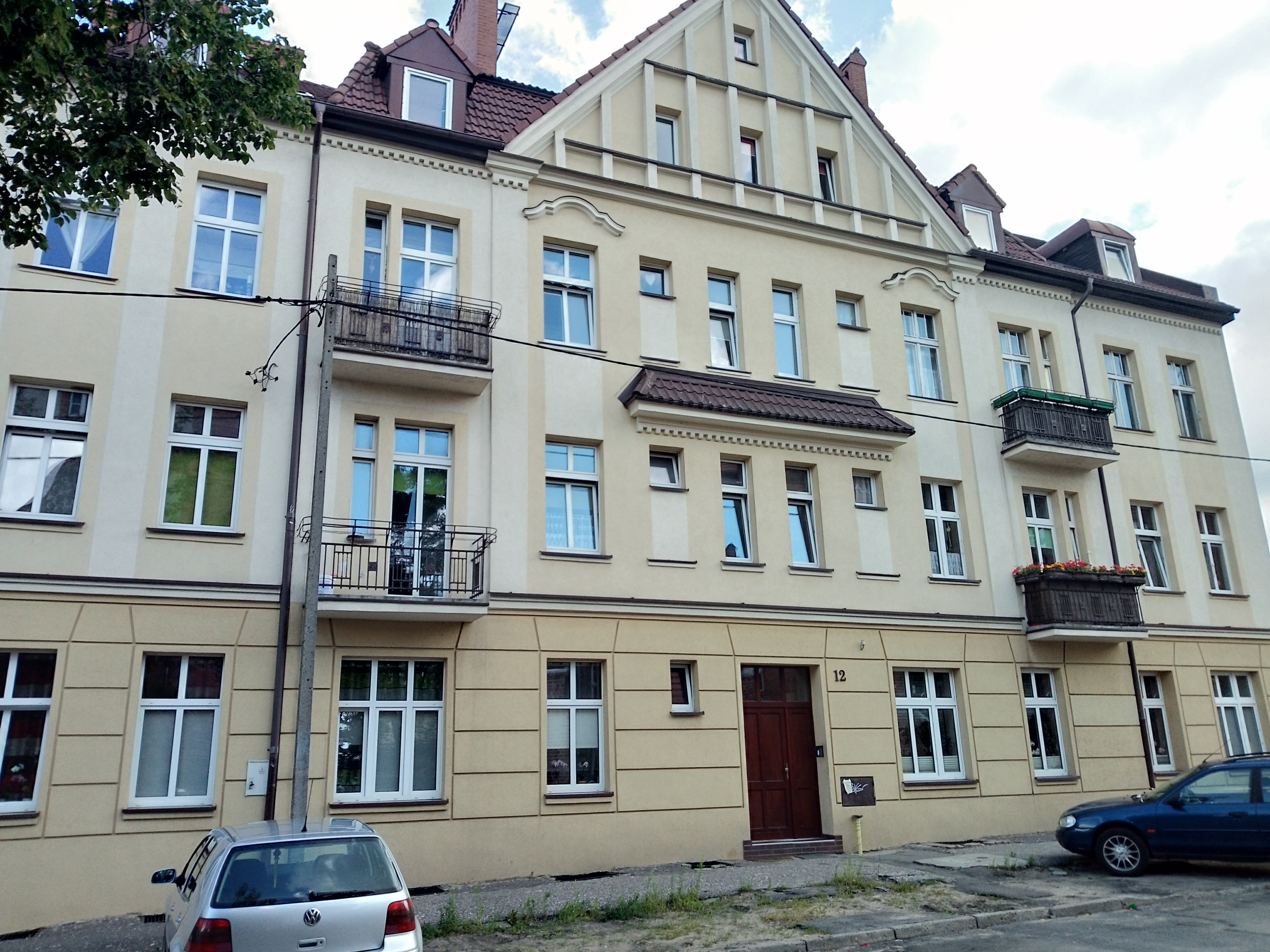
View of facade at Nr.12 from the street

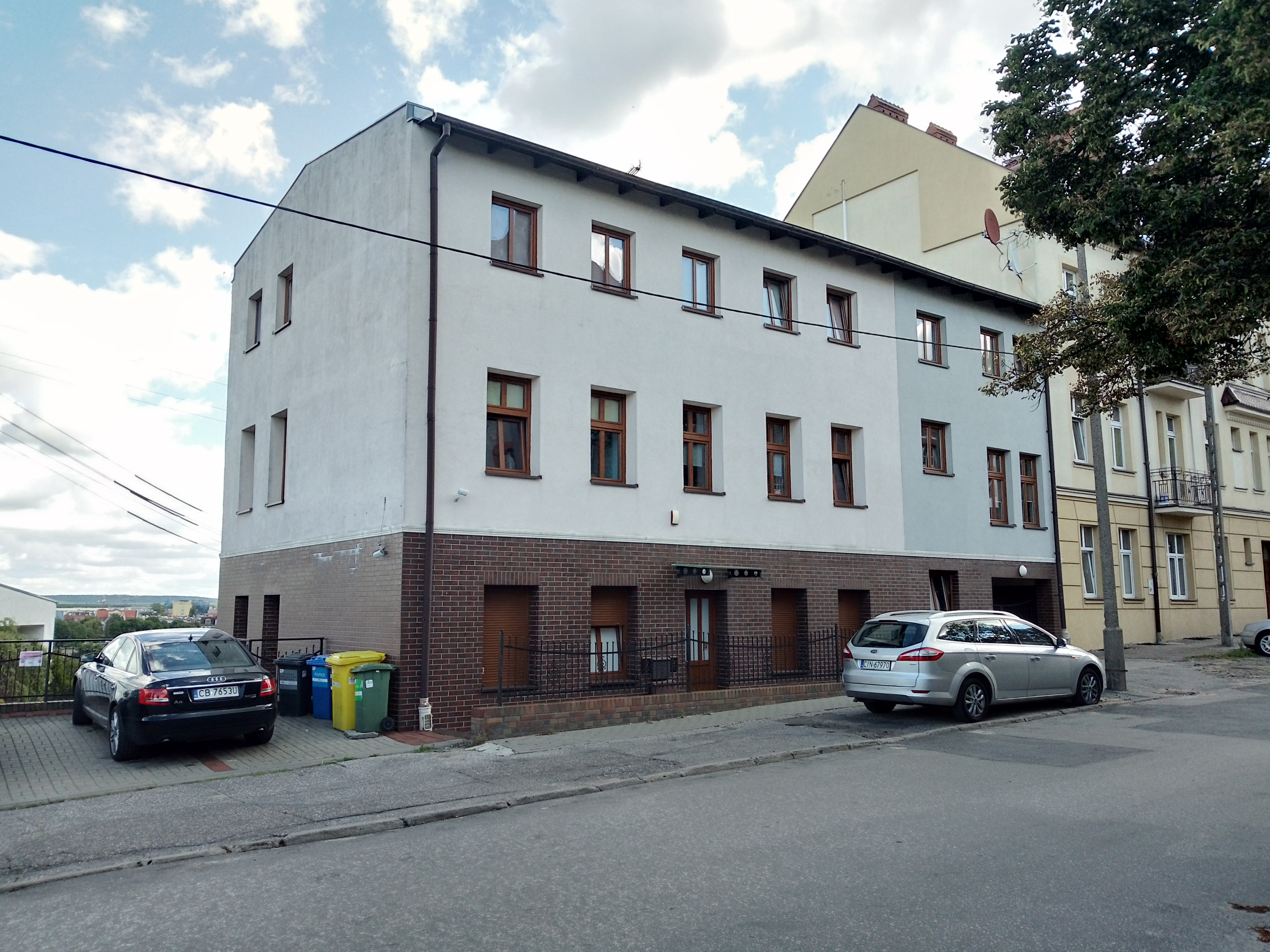
Main elevation of Nr.14

== See also ==
- Bydgoszcz
- Szwederowo district, Bydgoszcz
- Henryk Dąbrowski Park and Aleja Górska in Bydgoszcz

== Bibliography ==
- (in Polish) Derkowska-Kostkowska, Bogna (2007). Miejscy radcy budowlani w Bydgoszczy w latach 1871-1912. Materiały do Dziejów Kultury i Sztuki Bydgoszczy i Regionu. zeszyt 12. Bydgoszcz: Pracownia Dokumentacji i Popularyzacji Zabytków Wojewódzkiego Ośrodka Kultury w Bydgoszczy. pp. 11–22.
- (in Polish) Chojnacka, Barbara. Najświętszemu Sercu Jezusa - Bydgoszcz wyzwolona Pomnik Piotra Trieblera i Teodora Gajewskiego. Bydgoszcz: Towarzystwo Miłosnikow Miasta Bydgoszczy - Bydgoskie Towarzystwo Naukowe. pp. 205–250.
