= Garbary Street =

Street in Bydgoszcz, Poland

Coordinates: 53°07′40″N 17°59′29″E

Garbary street in Bydgoszcz
Bydgoszcz
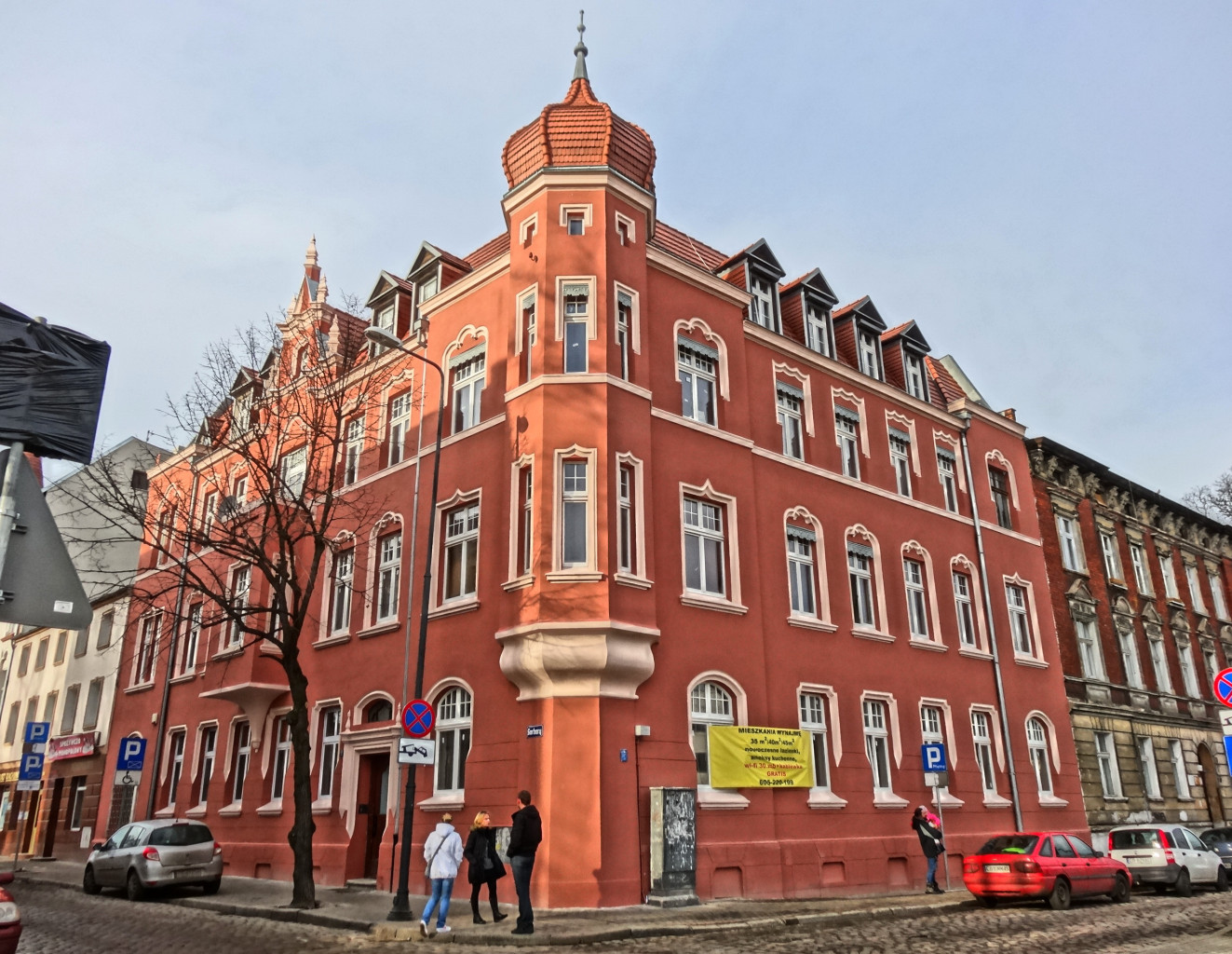
- View of the street at Nr.12

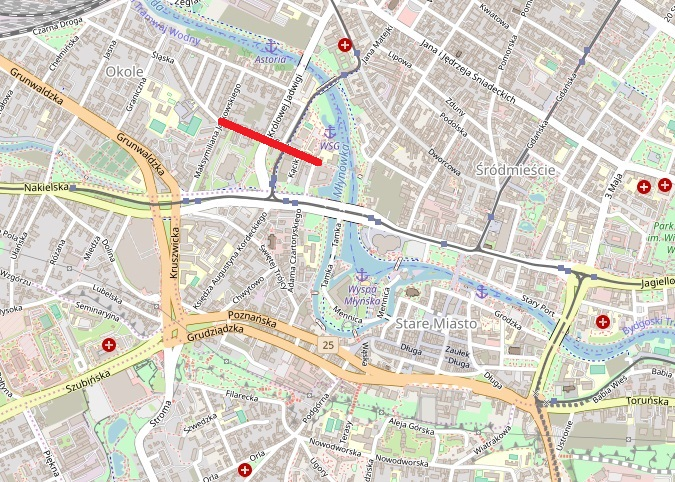
- Garbary Street highlighted on a map
- Native name: Ulica Garbary (Polish)
- Former name: Albert Straße
- Namesake: (in Polish) Garbarnia (tannery)
- Owner: City of Bydgoszcz
- Length: 350 m (1,150 ft)Google maps
- Width: ca. 10m
- Area: Okole district
- Location: Bydgoszcz, Poland

Construction
- Construction start: 1850s;
- Completed: 1900s

Garbary street is located in the Okole district of Bydgoszcz city, Poland. Its development occurred during the second half of the 19th century and today it displays several buildings listed on the Kuyavian-Pomeranian Voivodeship Heritage list, with a variety of architectural styles, from eclectic to early modernist. The area also nurtured a series of local successful factories, under the Prussian and the Polish periods.

== Location ==
The street is located on an area between the Brda river and the Bydgoszcz Canal, laid on an ESE-WNW axis. It starts from the river bank and crosses a handful of other streets, among which Królowej Jadwigi Street.

== History ==
The plot of land where the street lies was called canalswerder (transl. canal islet) in the 19th century, as mentioned on an 1857 Prussian map of Bromberg.

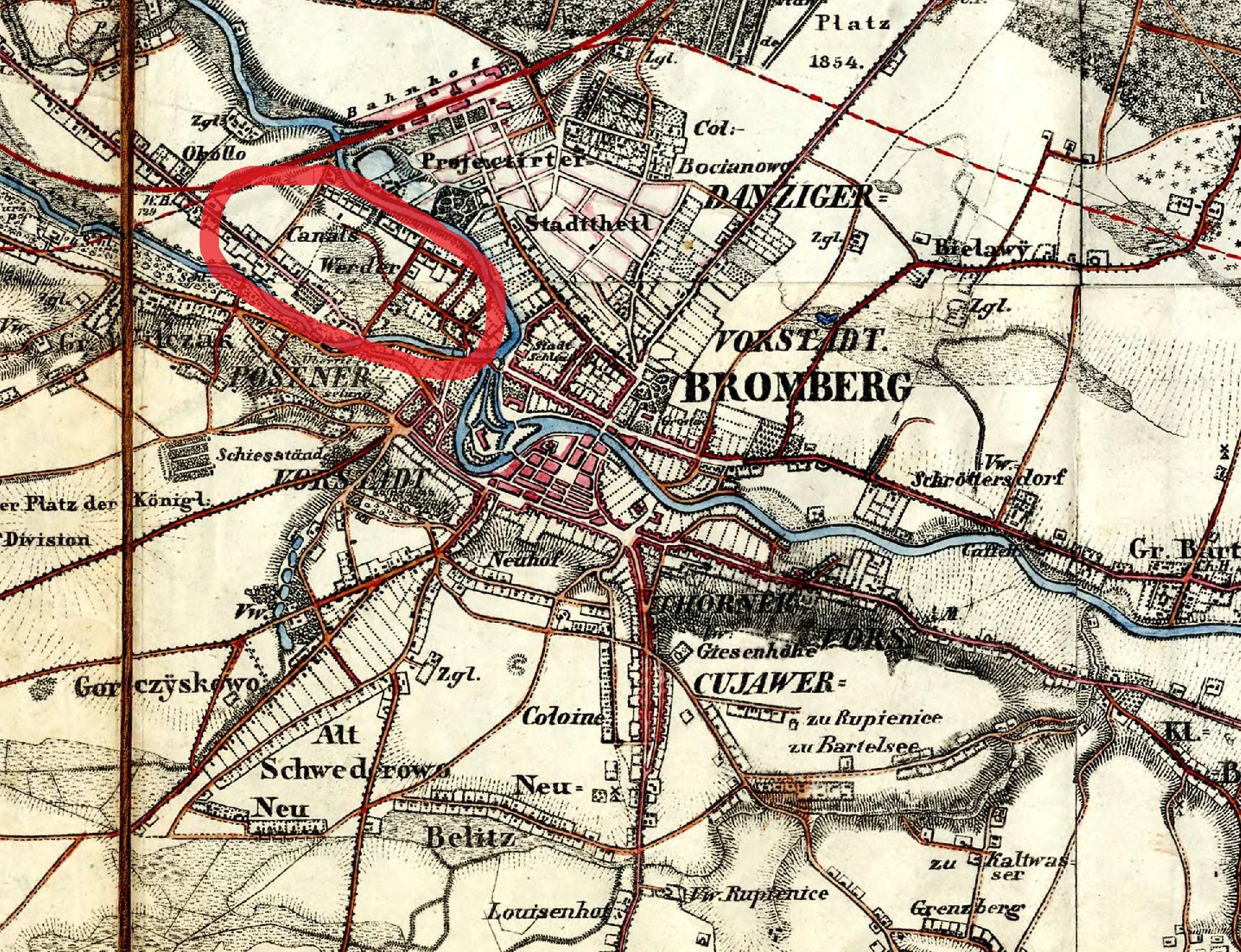
Canalswerder area on an 1857 map

Indeed, the area was delimited by the Brda river bed on the north and the Bydgoszcz Canal on the south. Nowadays, the sector is even cut off in the north-west by a second section of the Bydgoszcz canal, built in the early 20th century.

The street is mentioned as early as the mid-19th century, as the address of the successful Buchholz tannery. The rest of the building plots have been completed at the turn of the 20th century.

The street bore only two names through time:

- 19th century - 1920 and during German occupation, Albert straße, from Prince Albert of Prussia (1837–1906);
- 1920 - 1939 and since 1945, Ulica Garbary.

The current appellation Garbary refers to the (Buchholz) tannery, called garbarnia in Polish.

== Main edifices ==
House at 1

Today occupied by a modest house, the plot was owned at the end of the 19th century by the Prussian State Bank (German: Seehandlung) and was offering guest rooms.

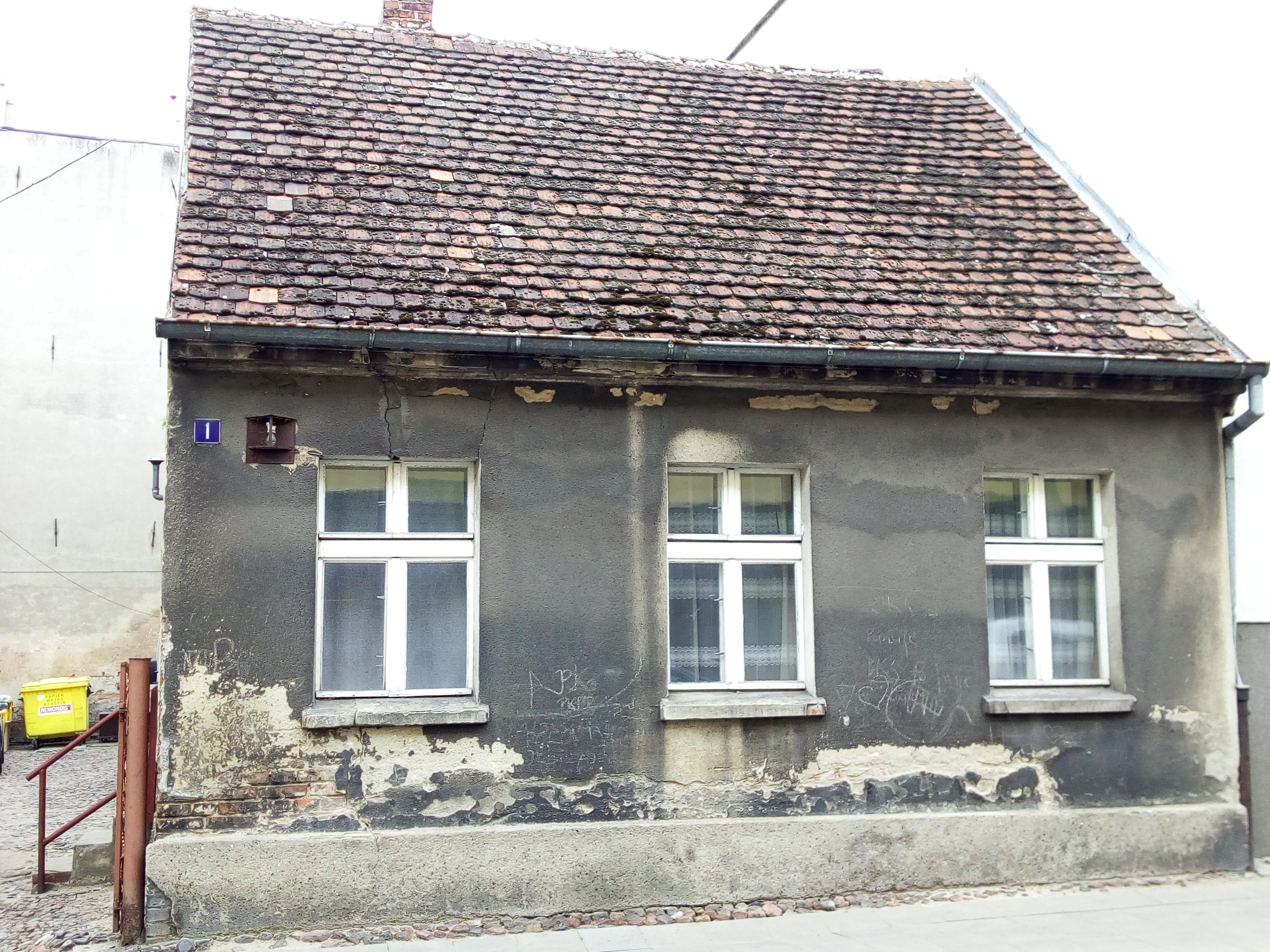
House at 1

Former Buchholz's tannery at 2/4

1877

Registered on Kuyavian-Pomeranian Heritage list Nr.601293, A/1066 (18 April 1995)

The Ludwig Buchholz's Tannery was a leather complex factory which operated from 1845 to 1992 in Bydgoszcz. The plot and the administrative building are now used by the Private University of Economy of Bydgoszcz (Polish: Wyższa Szkoła Gospodarki w Bydgoszczy).

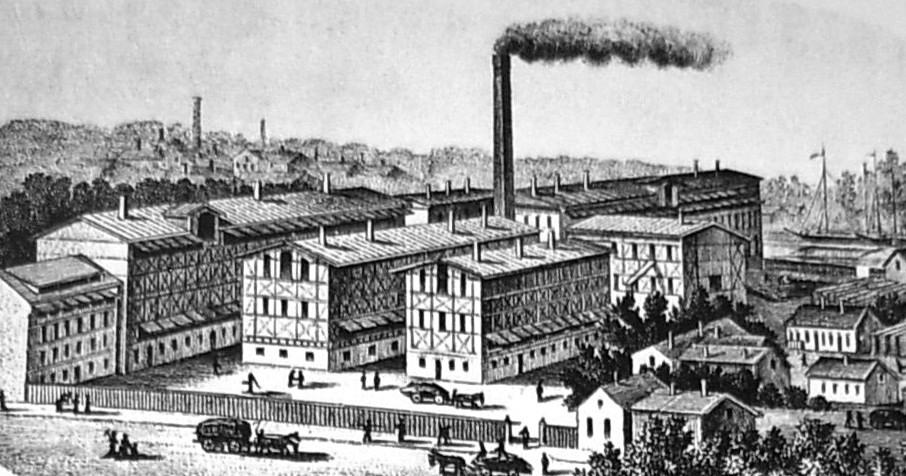
Sketch of the tannery at the end of the 19th century

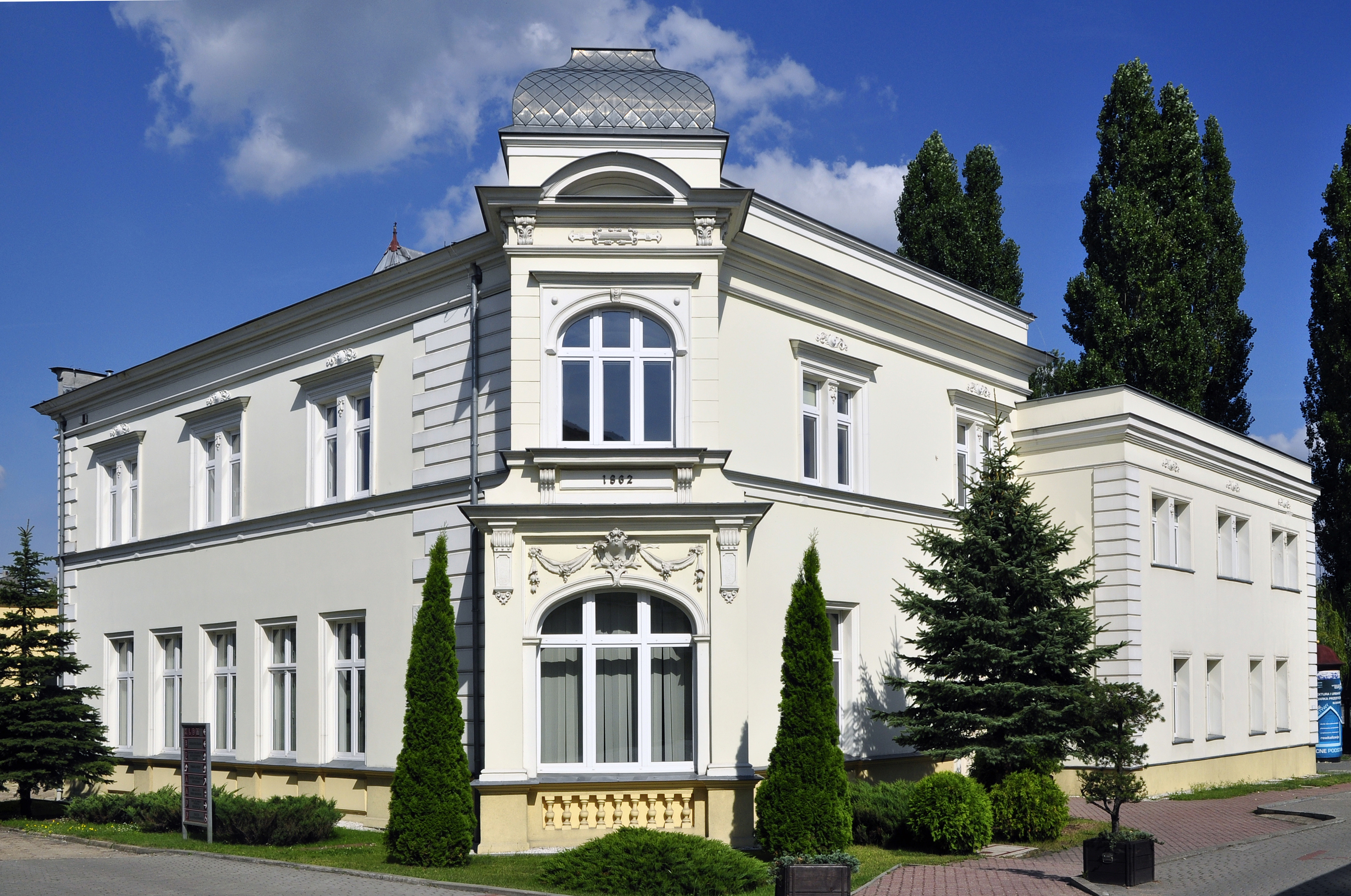
Former Buchholz's villa

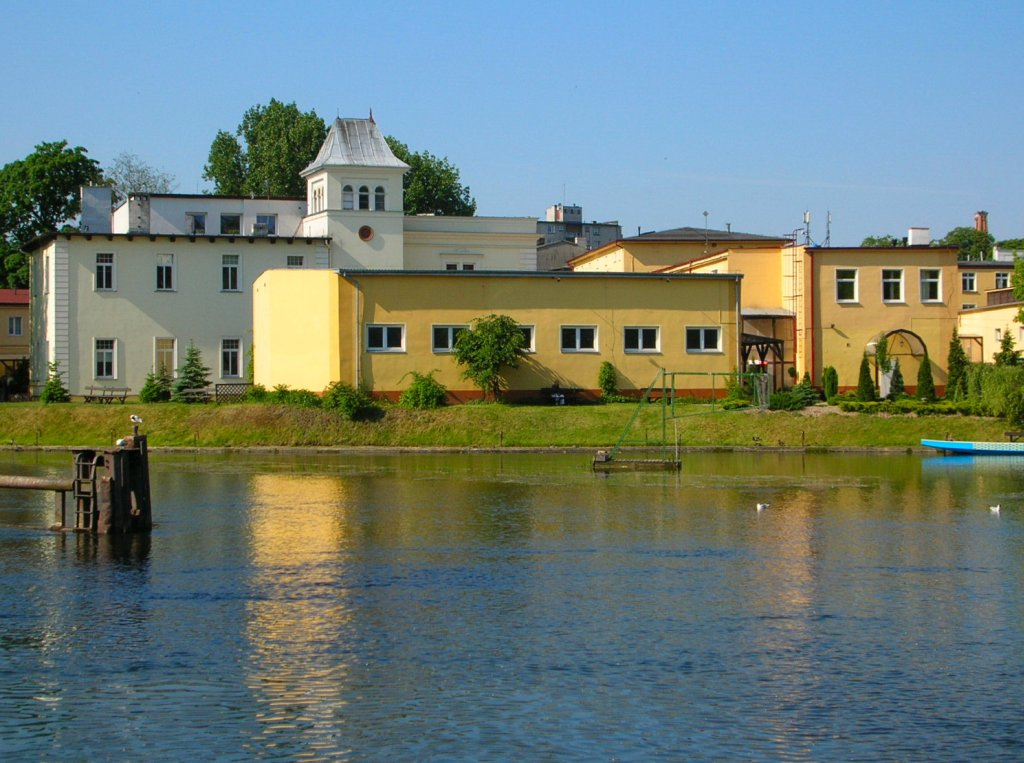
Today's view of the area

Tenement at 3

1880s, Eclecticism

The plot has long been housing manufacturing industries:

- in the 1880s, it was the property of Theodor Simons, an entrepreneur in the cigarette business. In the 1900s, he ran there a local printing house, Bromberger Unparteiischen;
- in the 1910s, Simons's business was acquired by the company F. Eberhardt, producing cast iron and steam powered engines, located at Swiętej Trojcy street.
- during the interwar, Marian Dziatkiewicz (1895–1965) set up in 1926 a production of photochemical plates, Alfa. In 1934, the successful business produced a million square meters of photographic papers and 30,000 square meters of photographic plates.

The growing success of the company led to the moving of the expanding factories in the area of Piekna street in Bydgoszcz before WWII: it was then renamed FOTON.

The building retains only its global shape, with a high corner wall gable, but it lacks any architectural motif.

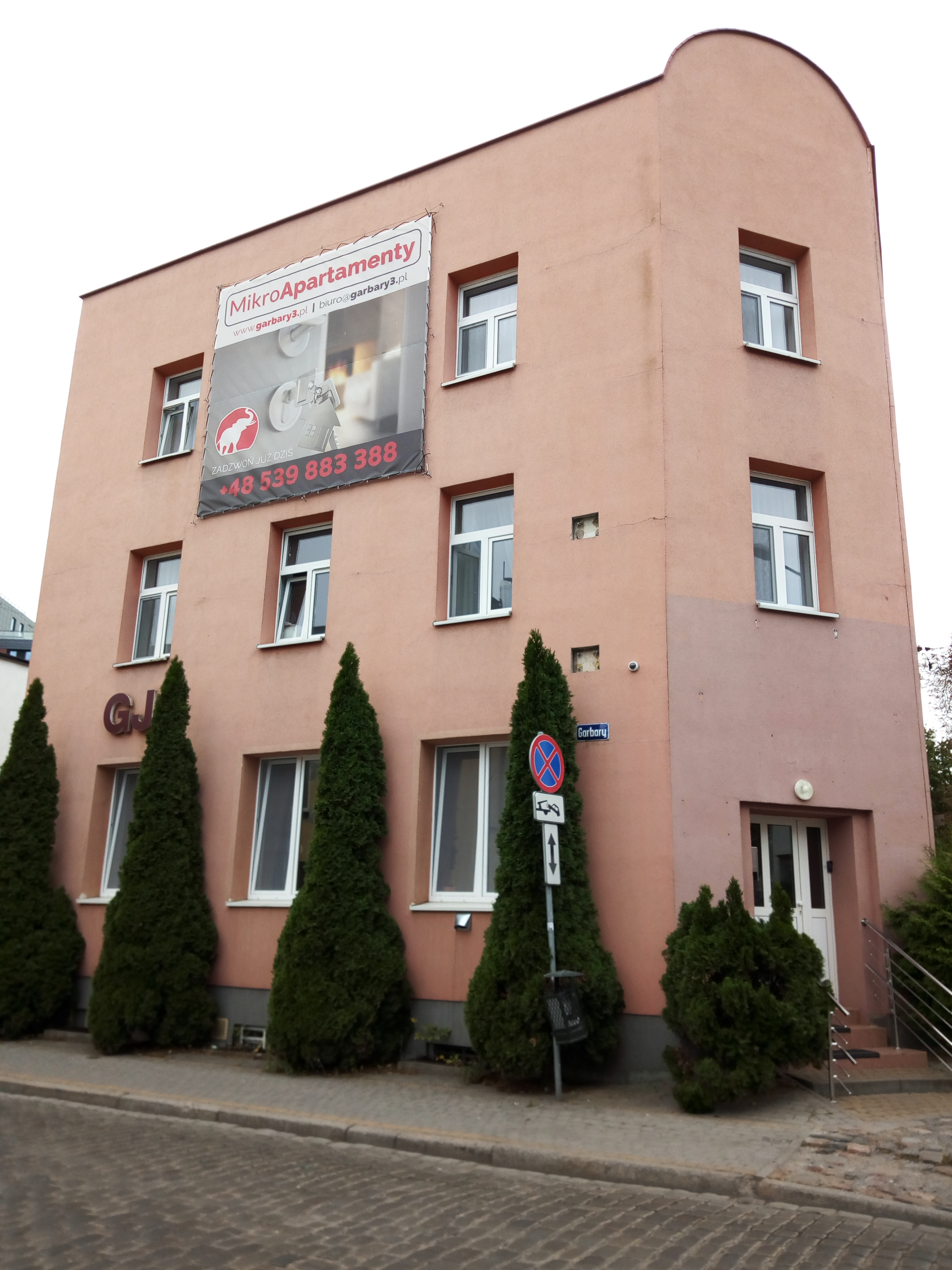
Building at 3

Tenement at 5

1950

Initially owned by Theodor Simons's firm, the lot moved to the ownership of August Appelt in the late 1890s. He established there, then Albertstrasse 4, a shutter and roller blinds factory, Jalousie Fabrik.

During Communist period, the area housed the production site Nr.5 of the state-owned enterprise of food industry (Polish: Przedsiębiorstwo Przemysłu Spożywczego) Jutrzenka, specialized in sweets and chocolates. In 2014, the Polish company Colian which succeeded Jutrzenka after the fall of communism, announced that the lot will be transformed into a housing estate.

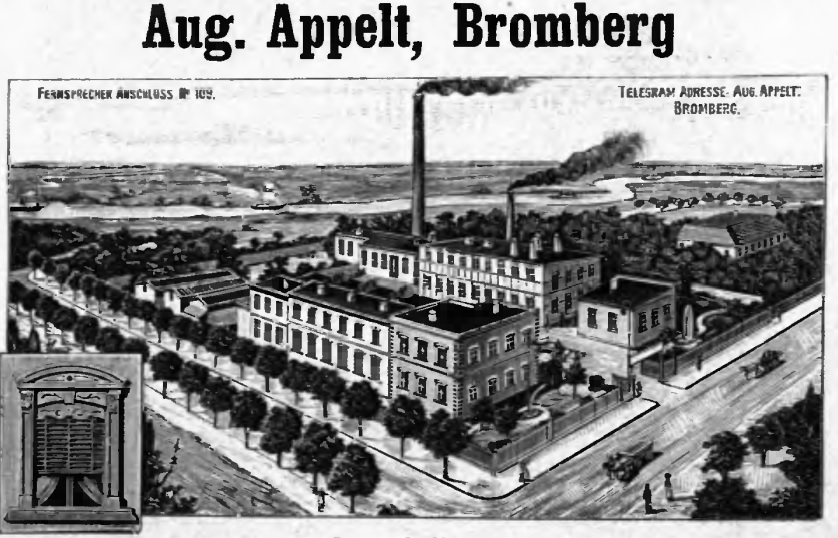
Agust Appelt Factory ca 1900

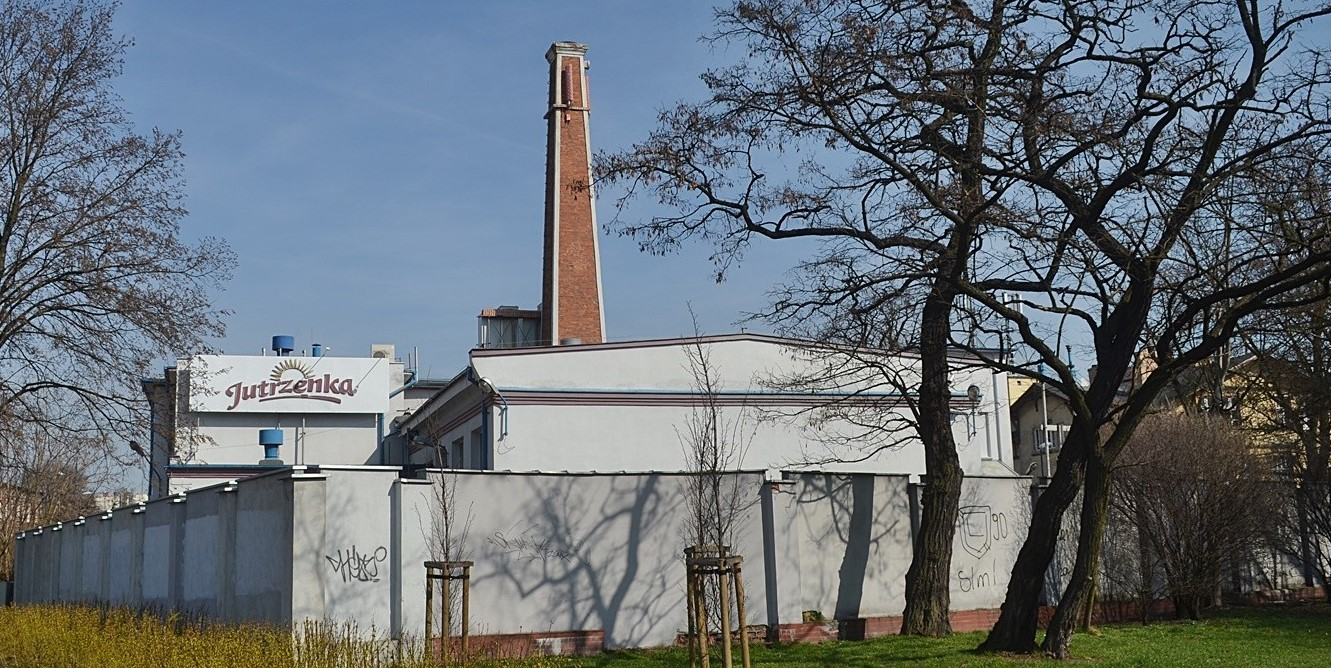
Former Jutrzenka production site at 5

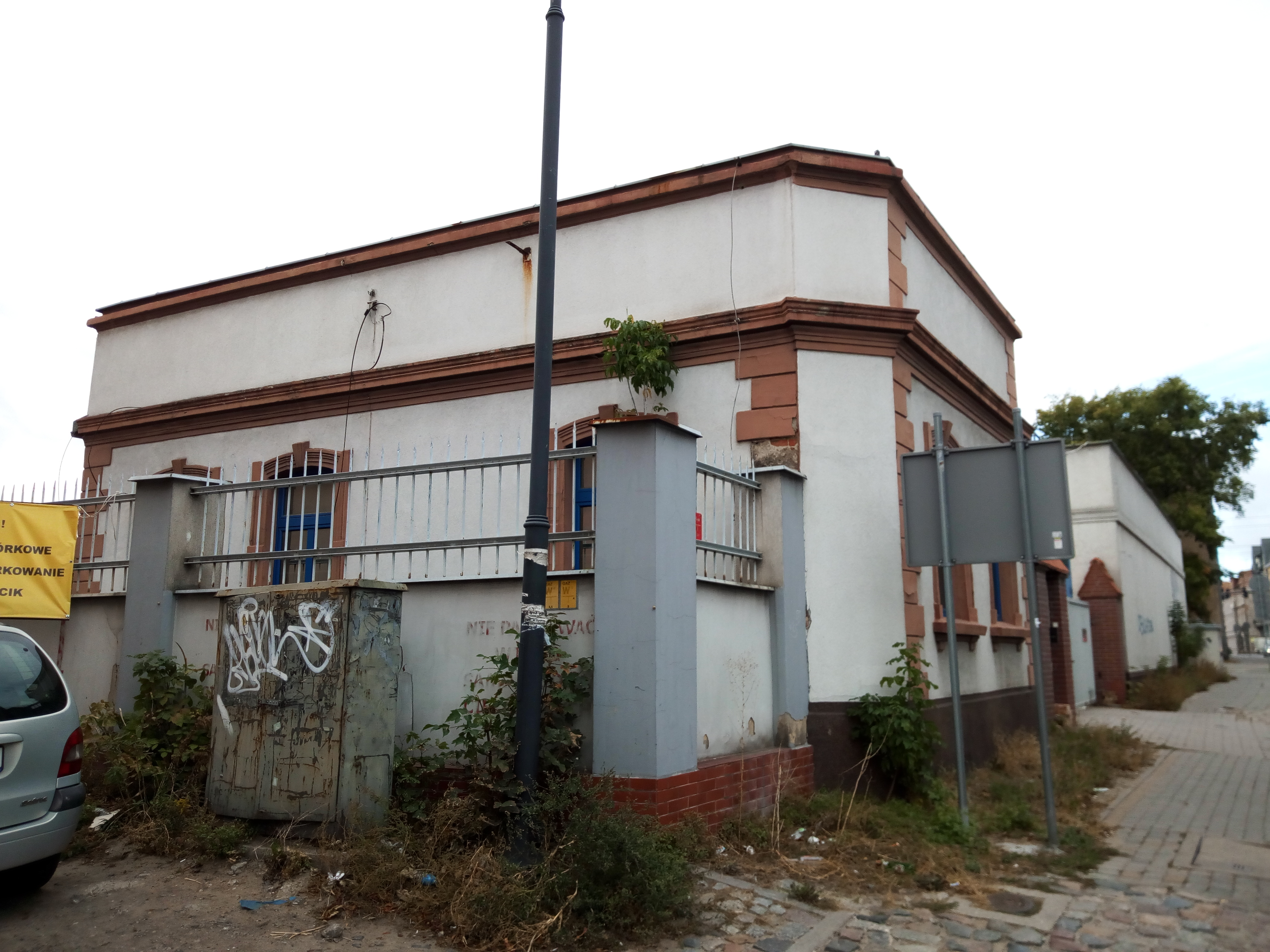
Former Jutrzenka production site at 5

Tenements at 6/8

1937–1938, Early modernism

In the end of the 19th century, the land at Albertstrasse 32/34 had been acquired by the tanning firm of Buchholz. It remained the case until the early 1930s, when modernist buildings were erected in 1937–1938. These tenements were very popular at the time, as one can still notice today in downtown Bydgoszcz (e.g.Kossowski's 20 Stycznia 1920 Street 41 or Ossoliński Alley 17 and 19 from Bolesław Polakiewicz).

The edifices kept their modern style entrance, the main door flanked by brick columns, covered by a square roof, with glazed brick surrounding the glass opening running through the stairs. These tenements have been refurbished in 2019–2020.

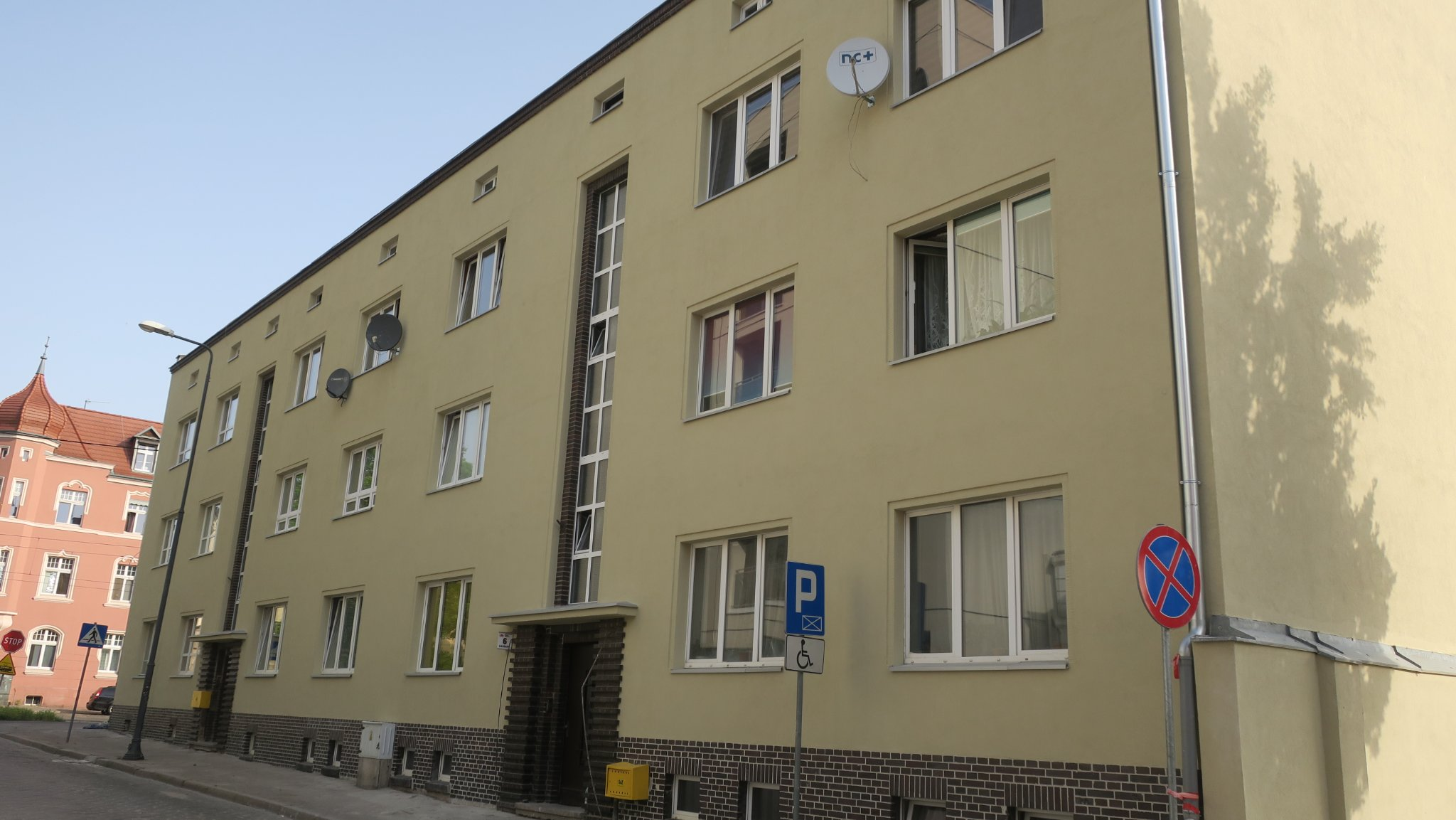
View of 6 and 8

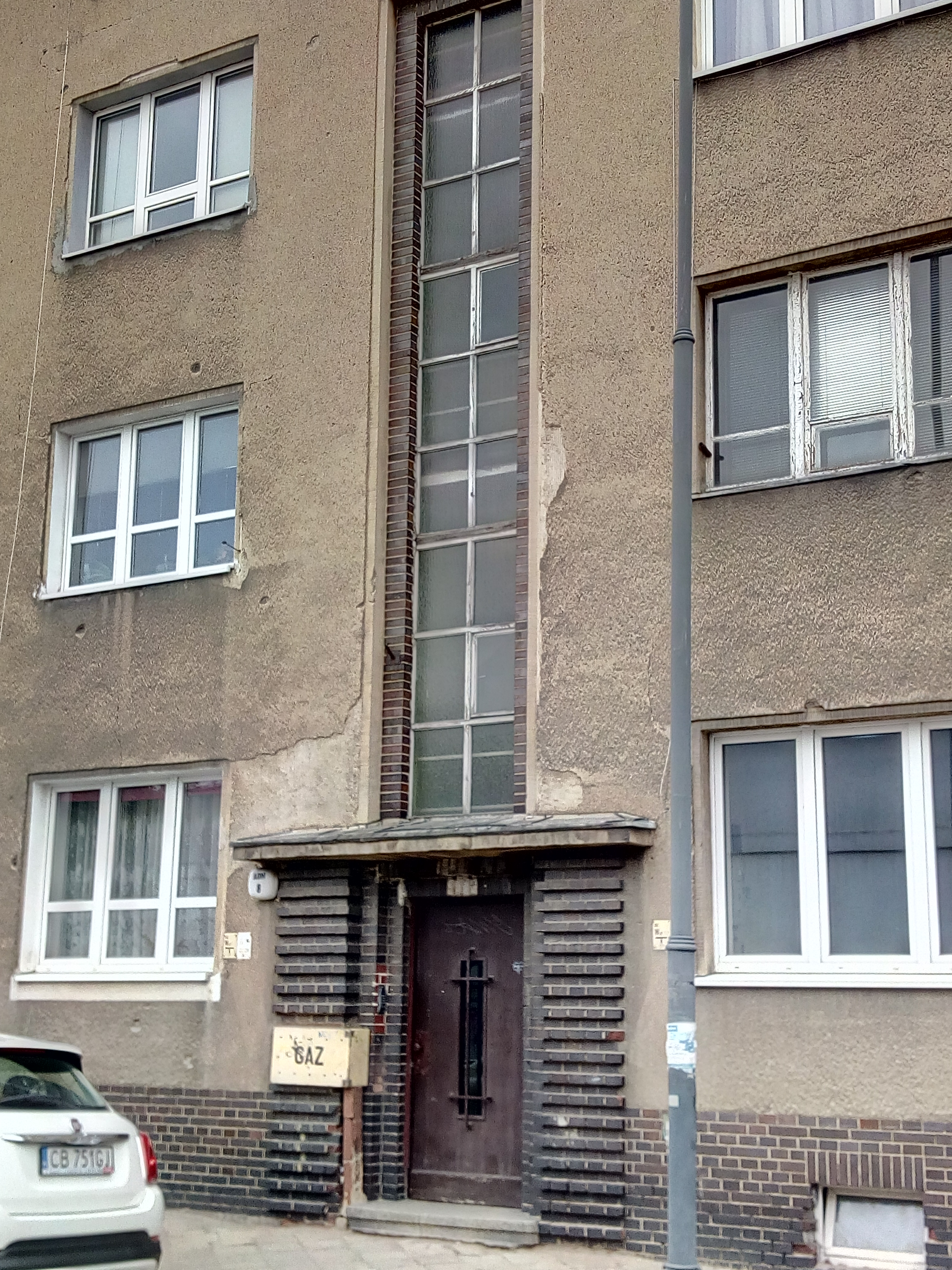
Entrance at 8, before renovation

Tenement at 9

1894–1895, Eclecticism

Earliest record of this building dates back to 1896, with the mention of the name of Friedrich Meyer, a builder, for landlord. However, he never lived there.

Although damaged, the elevation still displays interesting motifs: cartouches, a large entrance door with a semi-circle transom light, pedimented windows on the first floor and a corbel table carrying the roof. The western frontage onto Królowej Jadwigi Street has been decorated with old style visual advertising, prequel to the future global overhaul of the edifice.

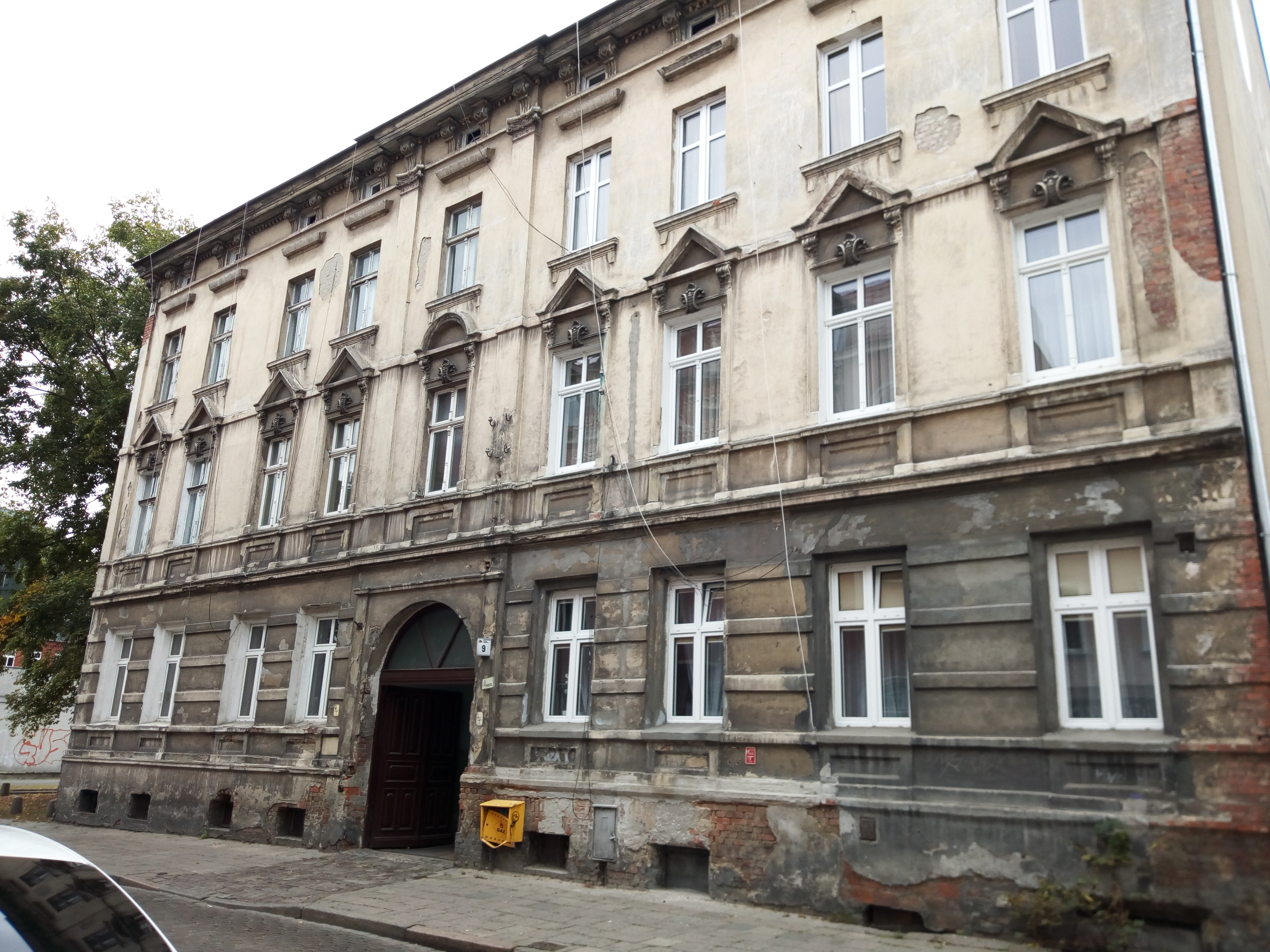
Main elevation from the street

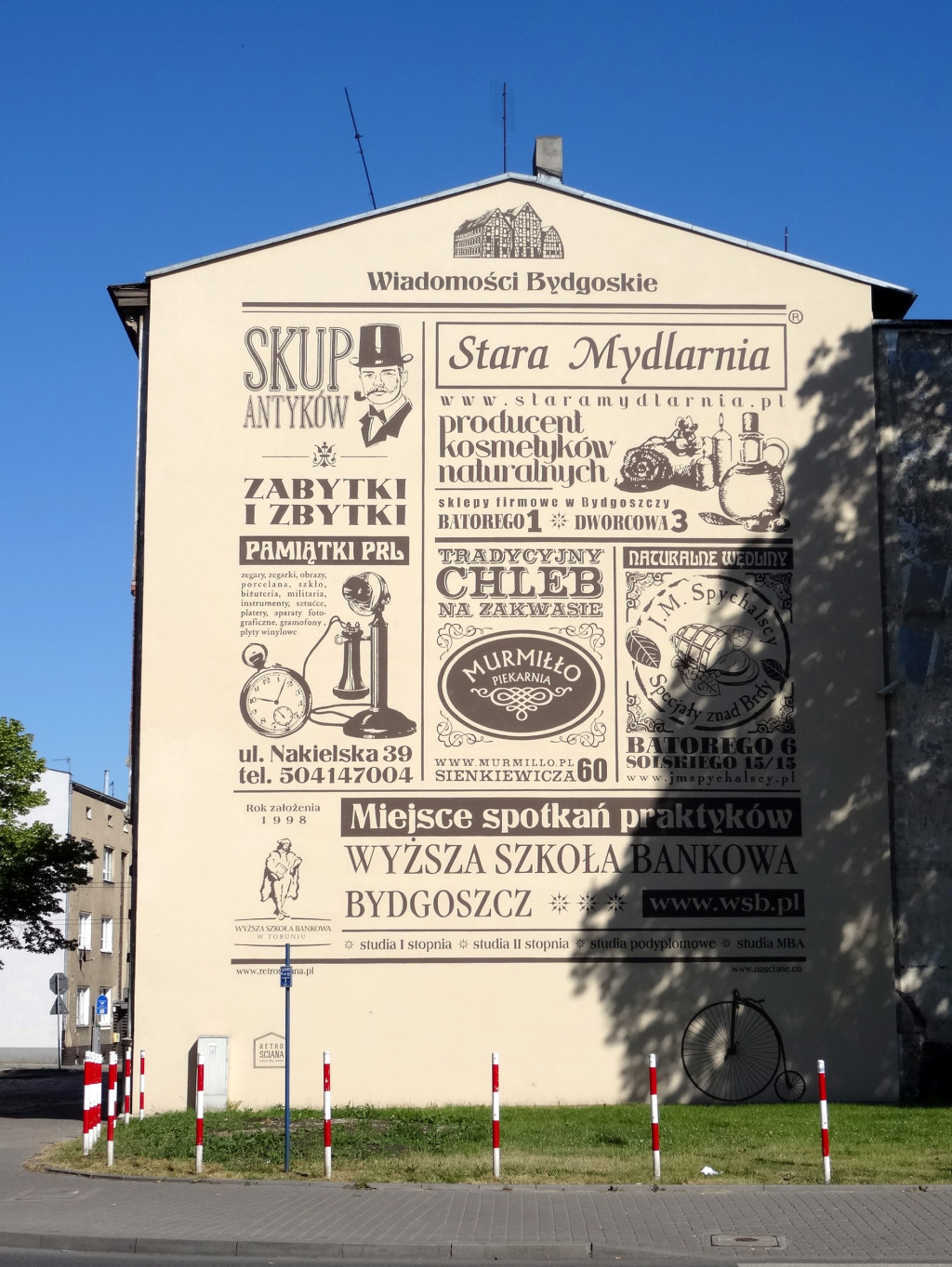
Old style adverts

ßrojahn tenement at 12

1904–1905, Neo-gothic

Registered on Kuyavian-Pomeranian Heritage list Nr.735495, A/1556 (26 March 2010)

This corner building has been commissioned by Theodor ßrojahn, a master locksmith, who lived in the neighbouring Holzhostraße (today's Naruszewicza street). He kept ownership of the tenement till 1920.

Gorgeously restored in 2018, this neo-gothic housing is teeming with architectural motifs and minute decoration, such as the corner bay window topped by an onion dome, the delicate framing of the openings, the pinnacles crowning the wall gable or the adorned main entry door.

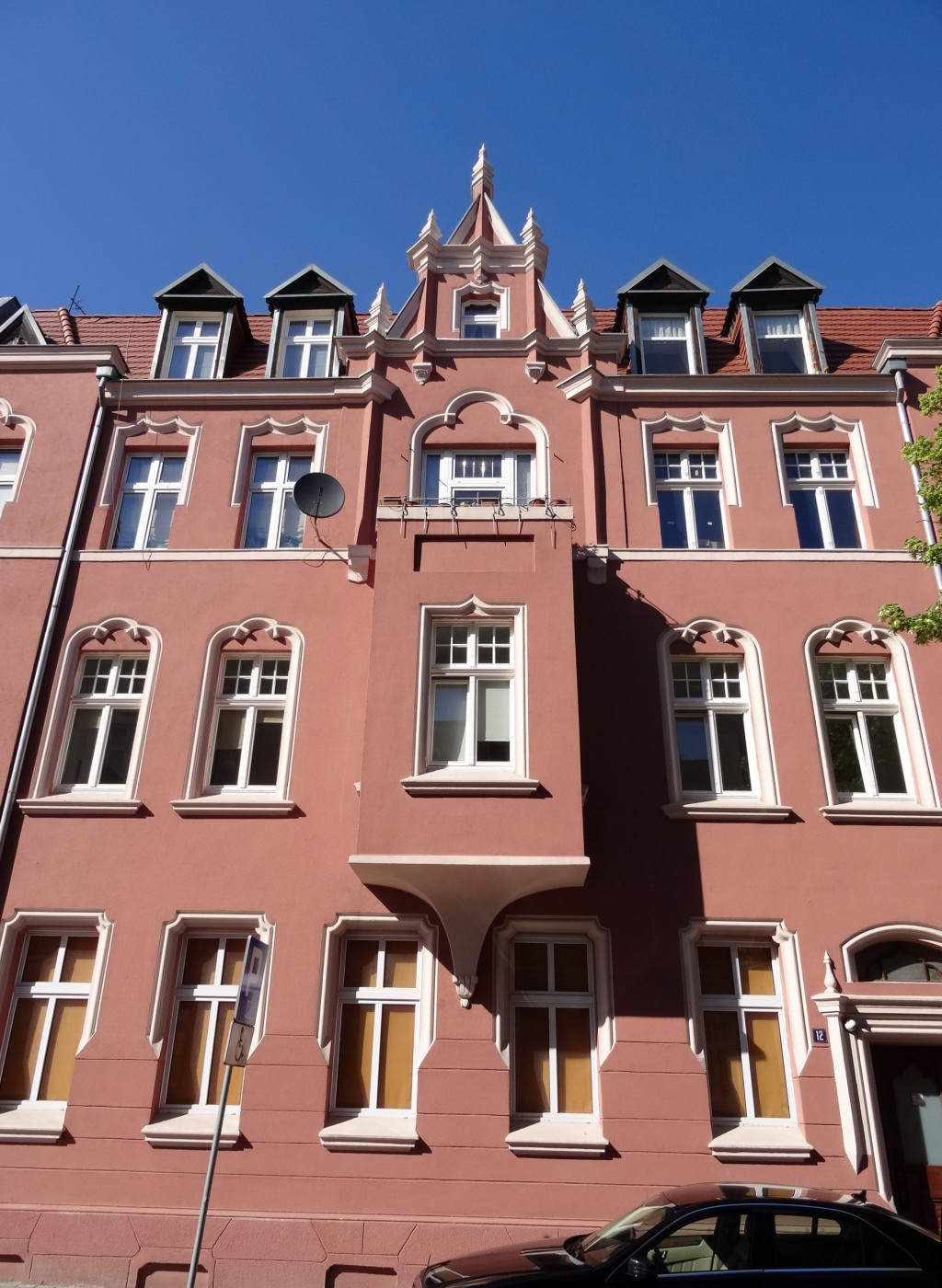
Bay window onto Garbary street, topped with pinnacles

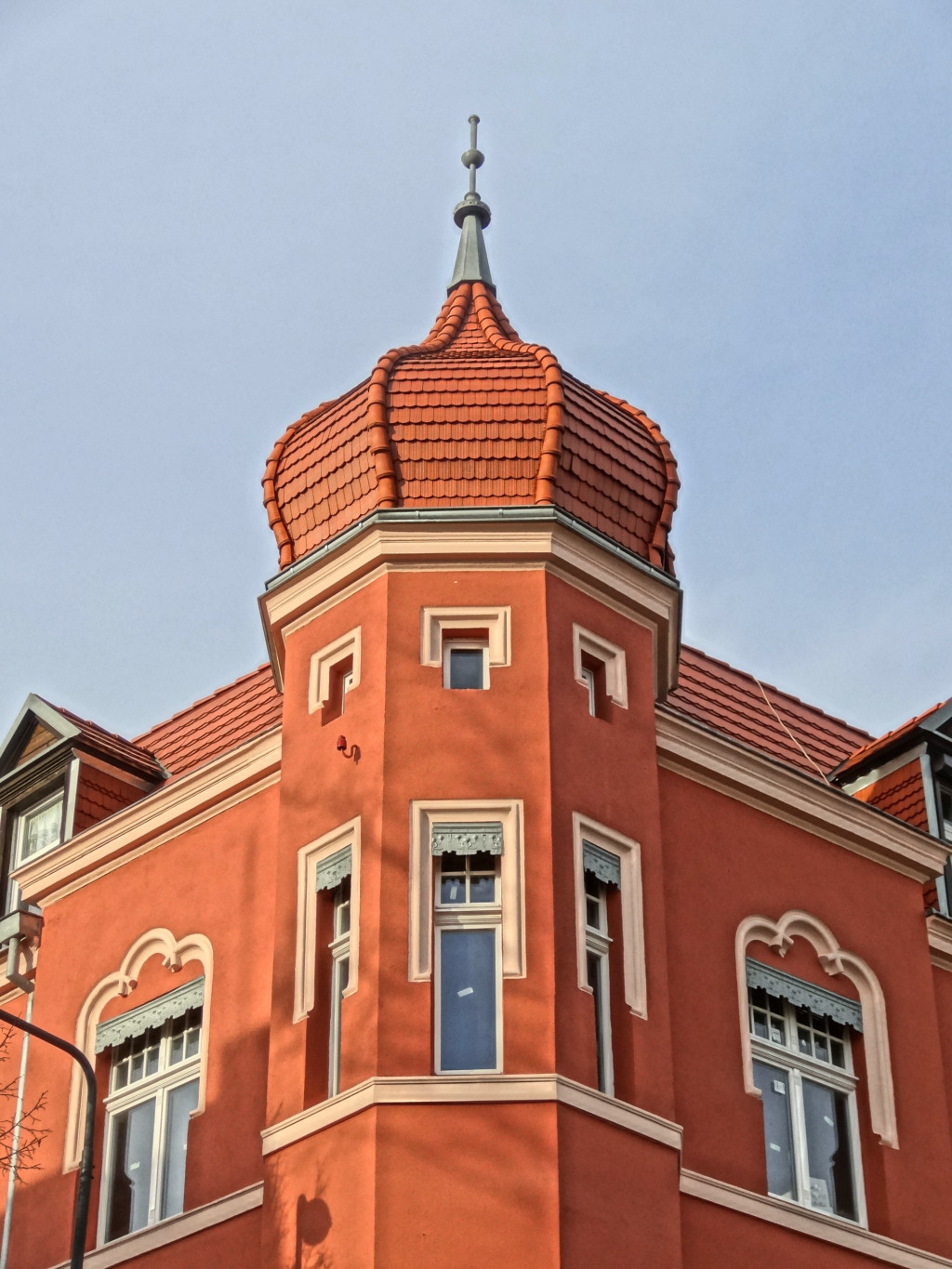
Bay window onion dome roof

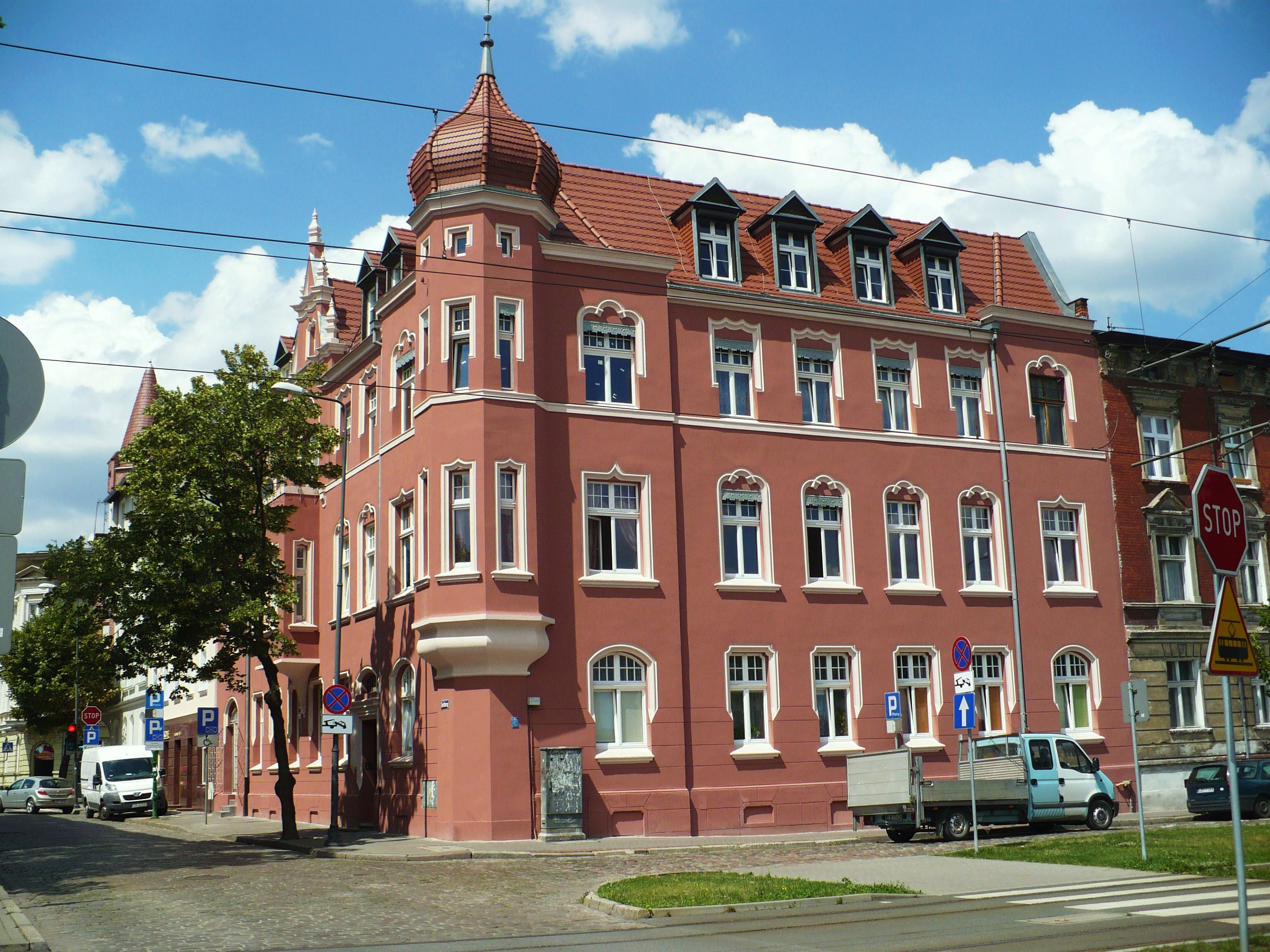
Frontage onto Naruszewicza street

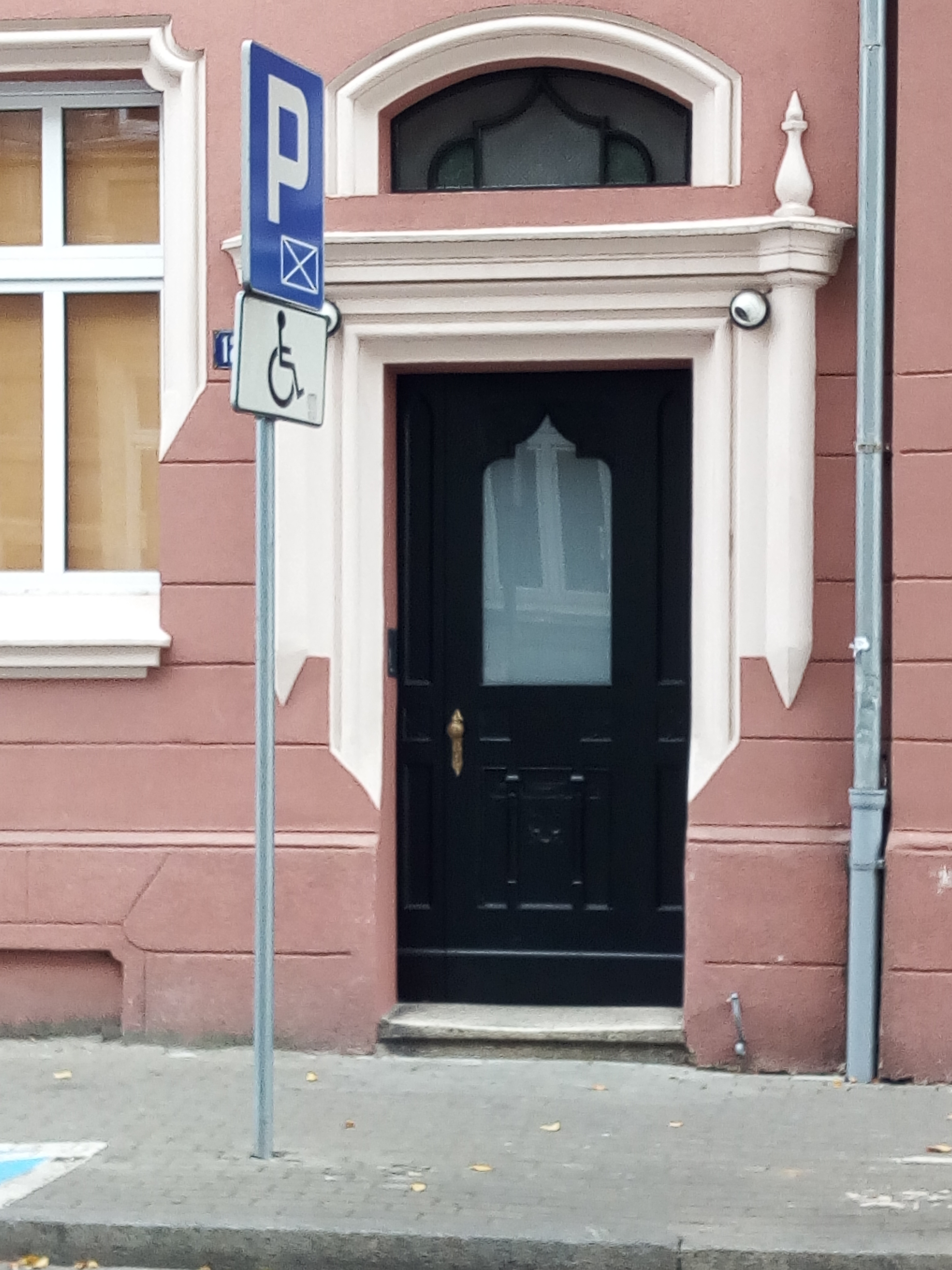
Entry door

House at 14

1880s

This old tenement has been first owned in the 1880s by a shoemaker, Martin Krusziński

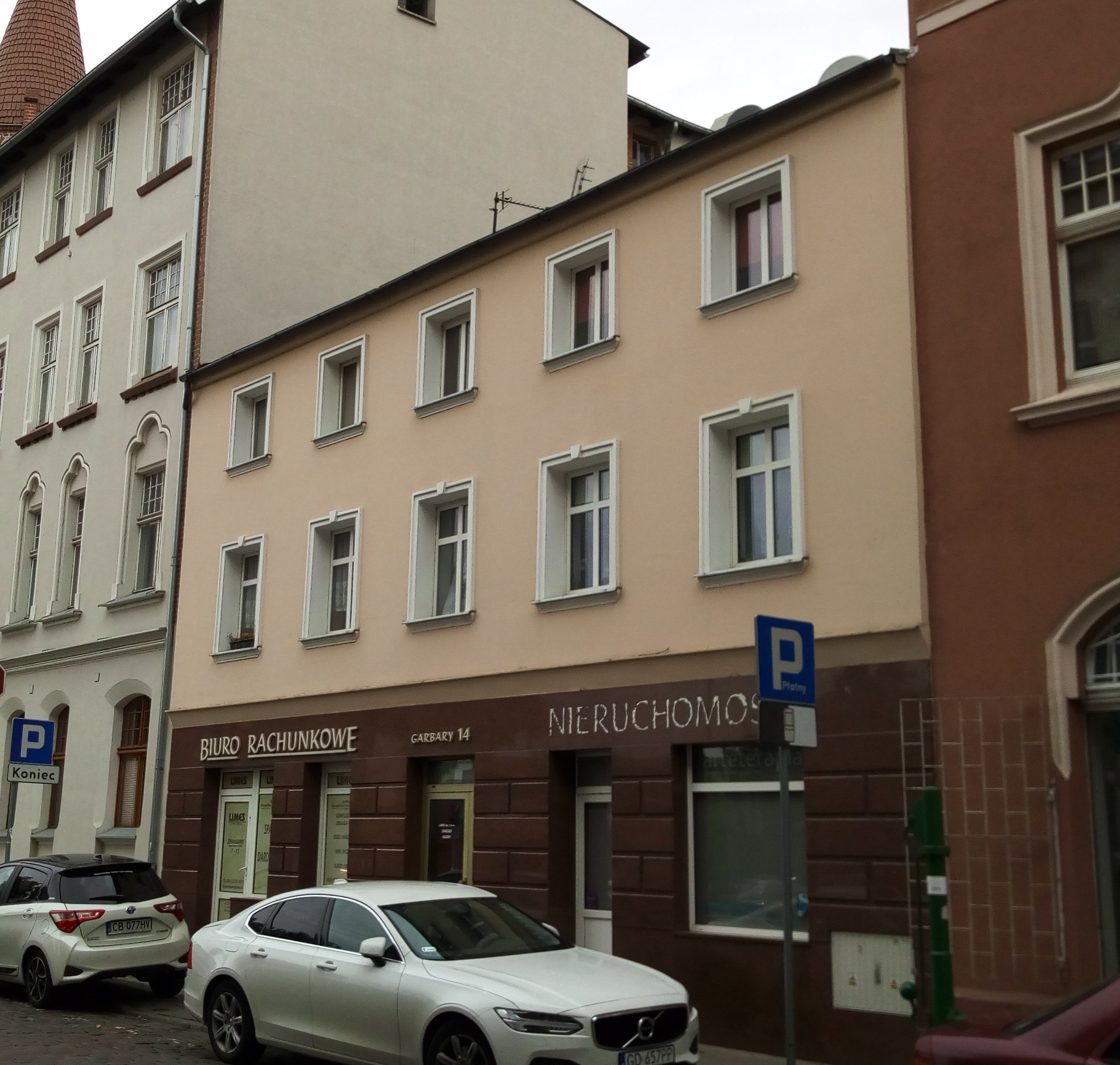
View from the street

Tenement at Królowej Jadwigi Street 1, corner with Garbary street

1890s

Eclecticism

Initially at Albertstraße 12, then Viktoria Straße 8, the tenement had been owned since 1878 by Gustav Modrakowski, a butcher, living at Feldstraße 7 (today's Jackowskiego street).

The corner building displays eclectic features on both facades. On the ground floor, bossage and round top windows topped by young female mascarons. On Królowej Jadwigi Street, the main portal is flanked by columns. The first floor boasts pedimented openings, with balustrade. On the corner, a bay window stretches through two levels, supported by ornamented brackets. On the right end of Królowej Jadwigi Street's facade, a slight avant-corps is underlined by two tall Corinthian order columns.

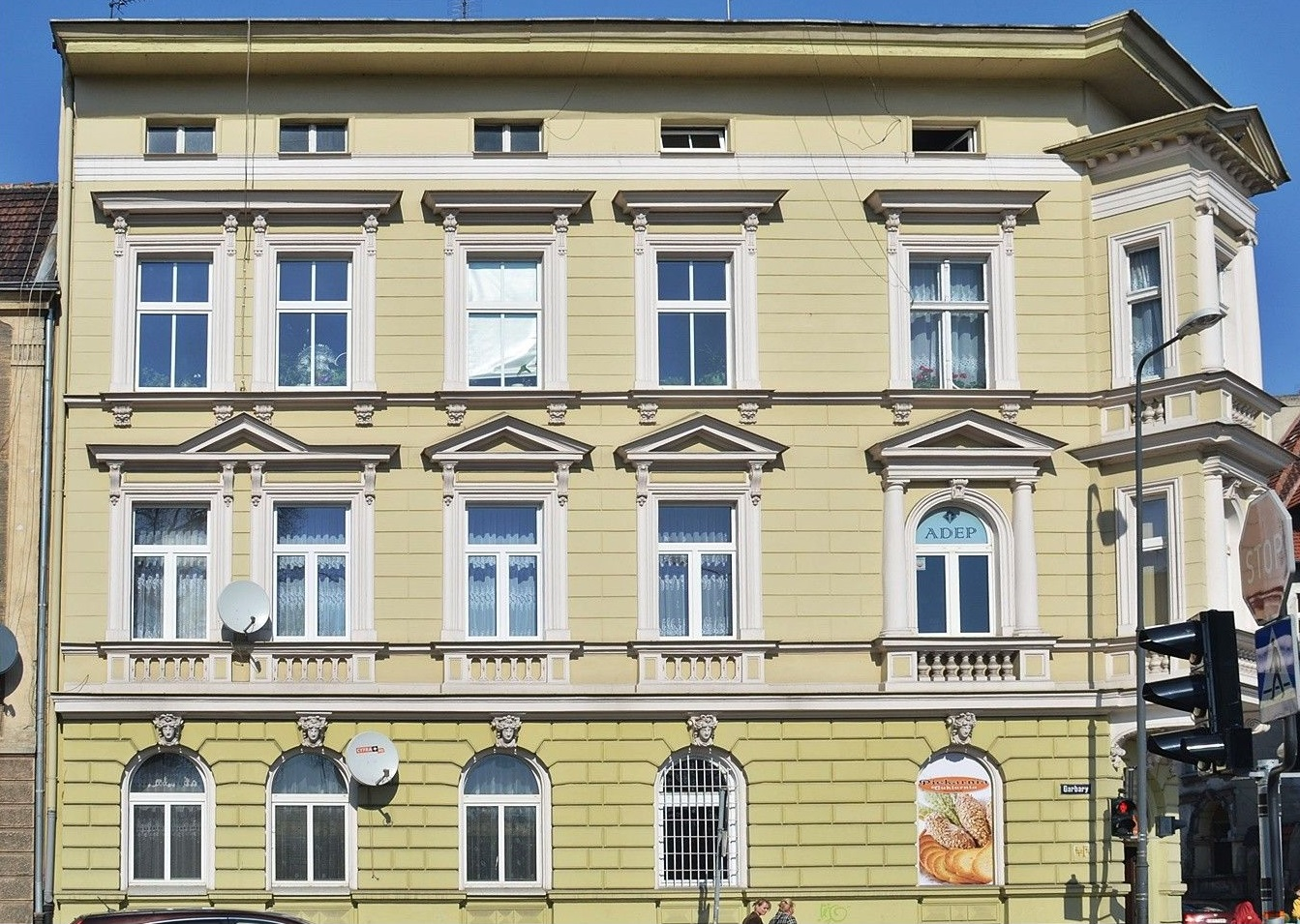
Frontage on Garbary Street

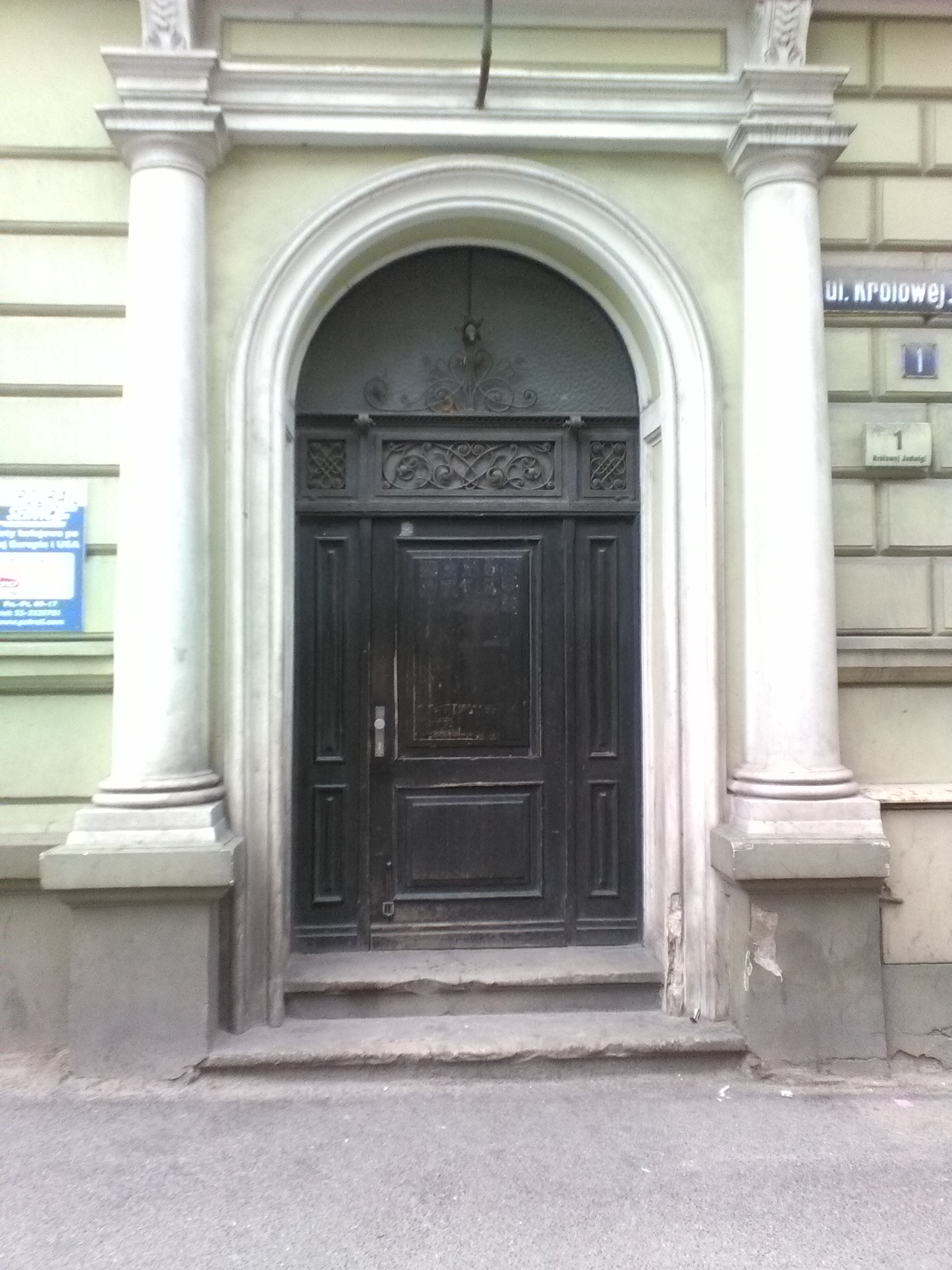
Door portal

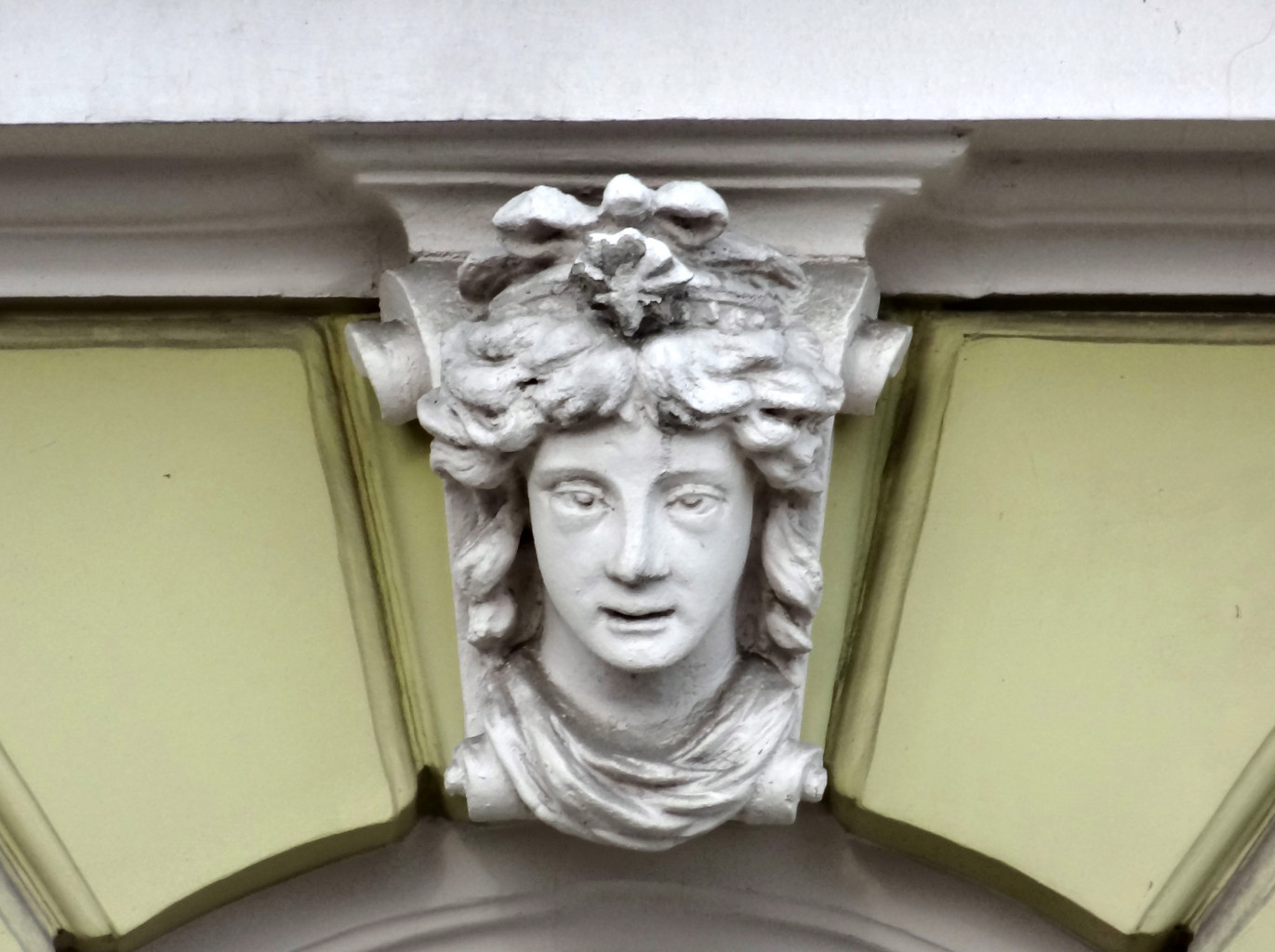
Detail of mascaron

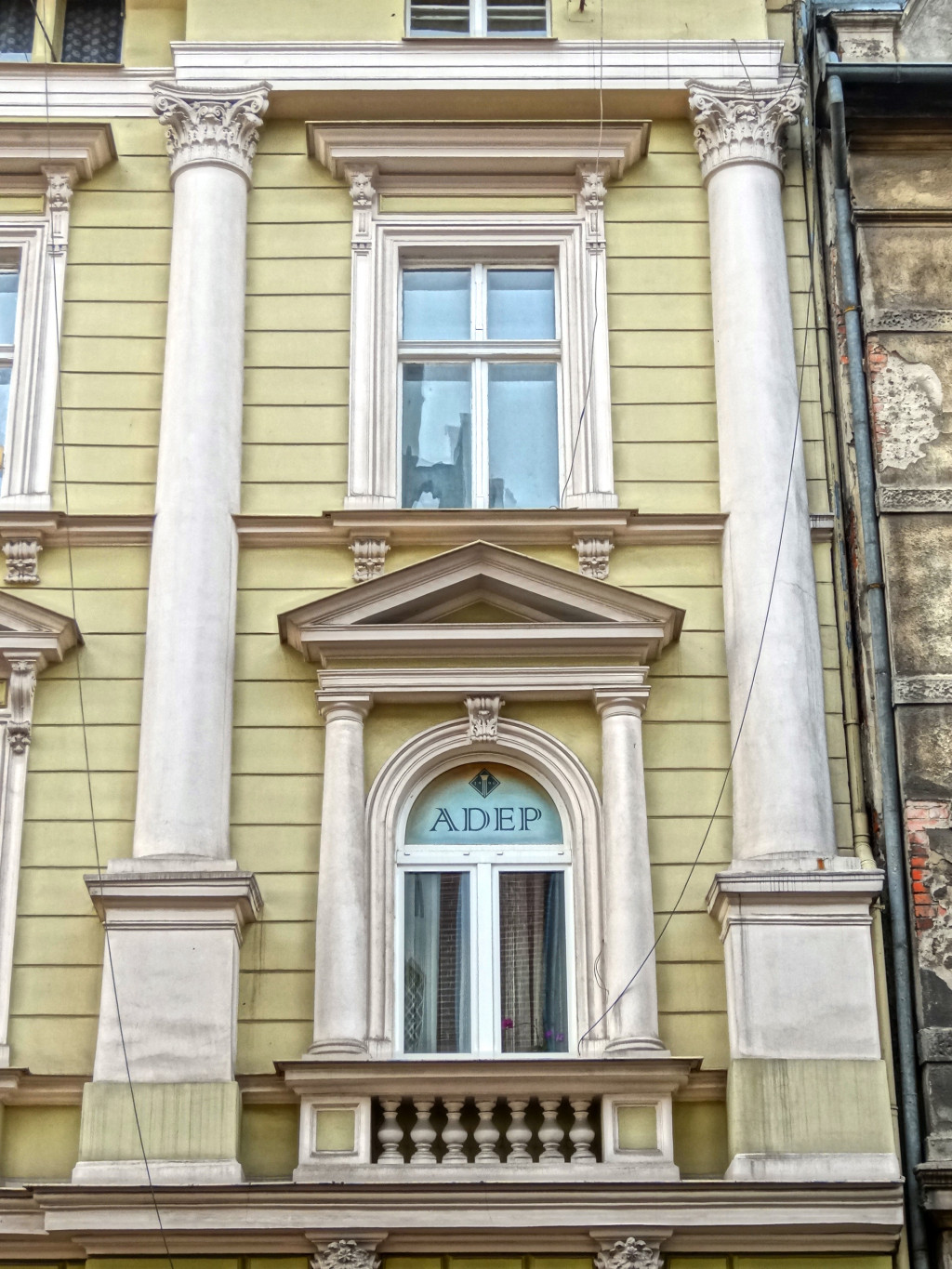
Avant-corps

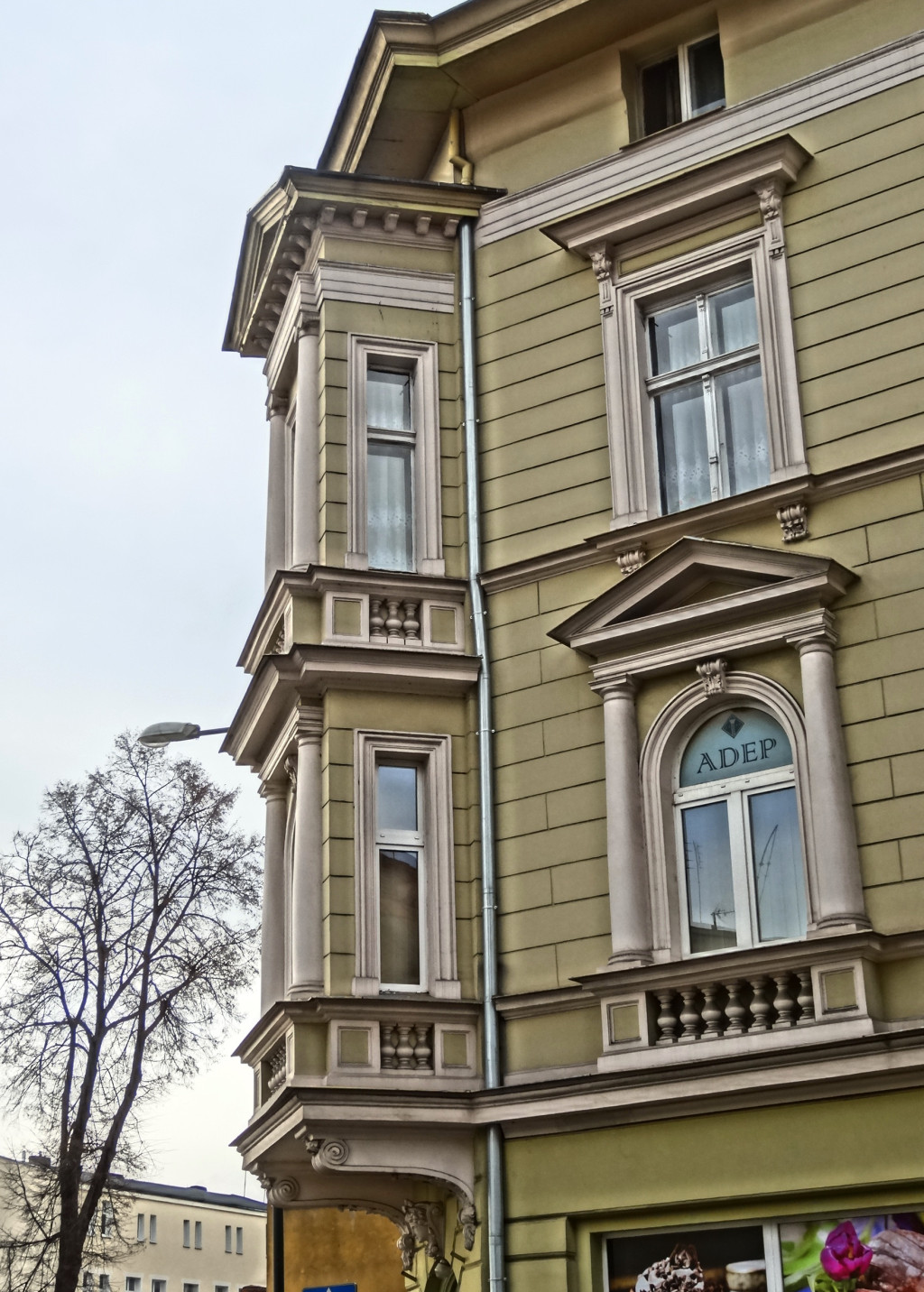
Corner bay window

Tenement at Królowej Jadwigi Street 2, corner with Garbary street

Registered on Kuyavian-Pomeranian Voivodeship Heritage list, Nr.601372 Reg.A/824 (May 30, 1994)

1900–1901, by Paul Böhm, Historicism

Paul Böhm, architect and designer of several buildings in Bydgoszcz (Słowackiego Street,3, Cieszkowskiego Street, 1&3, Józef Weyssenhoff Square, 5), also realized this corner edifice. He did not live there, preferring his house at Danzigerstraße 61 (Gdańska Street 107, building is gone).

The house features picturesque settings, with medieval references. Material is a mix of brick and plaster, with a particular notice to the facade on Królowej Jadwigi Street, where several architectural pieces are to be underlined. The corner is highlighted by a tall bay window adorned with gothic-shaped windows, oeil-de-boeuf and stuccoed motifs, topped by an octagonal tower capped by a crenellated conical roof. The frontage onto Jadwigi Street possesses another grand bay window with the same gothic-medieval allusions (e.g. the crow-stepped gable). In addition, the highest part displays in a medallion a figure of Tadeusz Kościuszko (by Piotr Triebler); above the medallion, a statue of Queen Jadwiga stands in a niche, towering the whole street that bears her name.

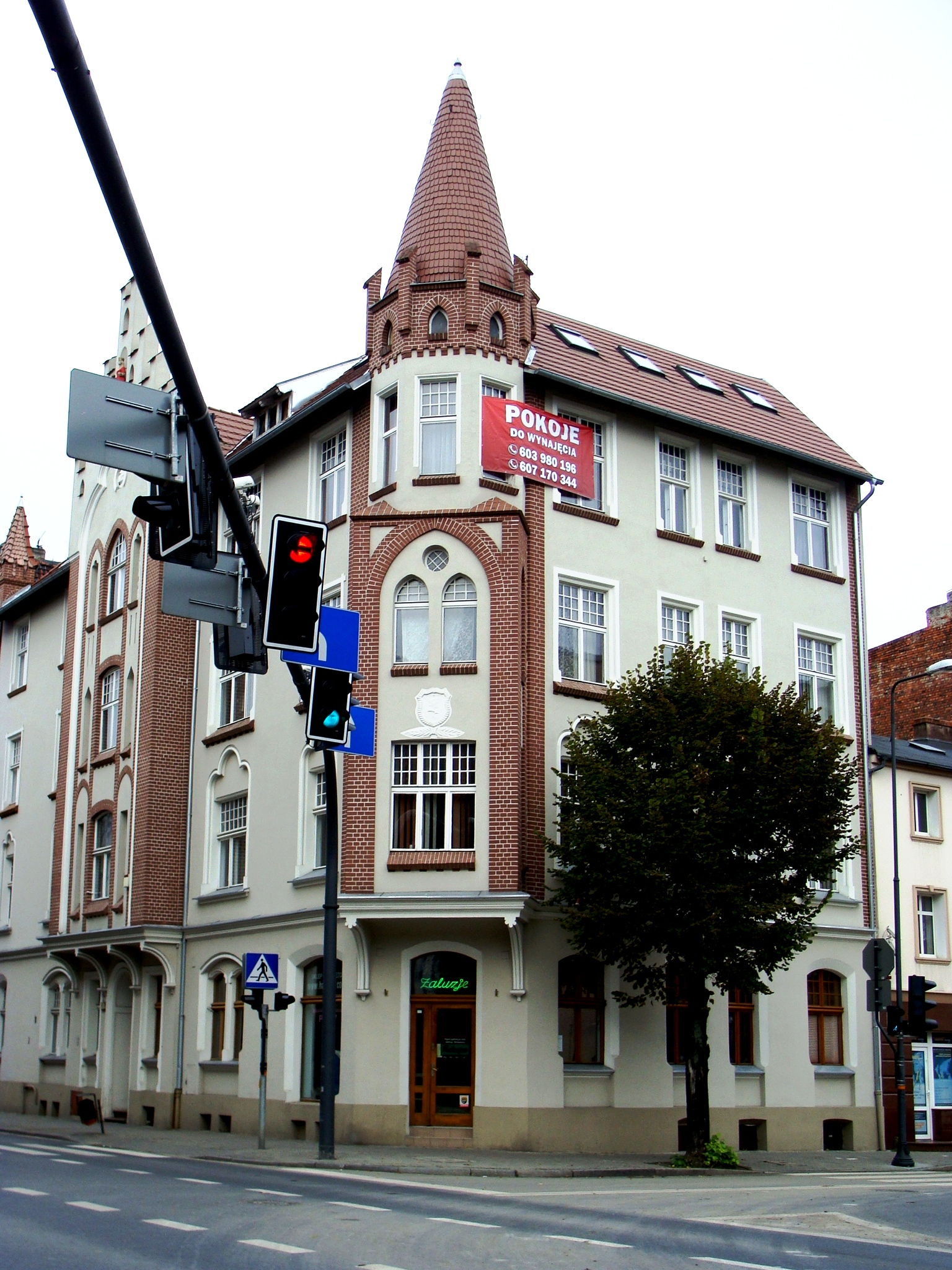
View from the street

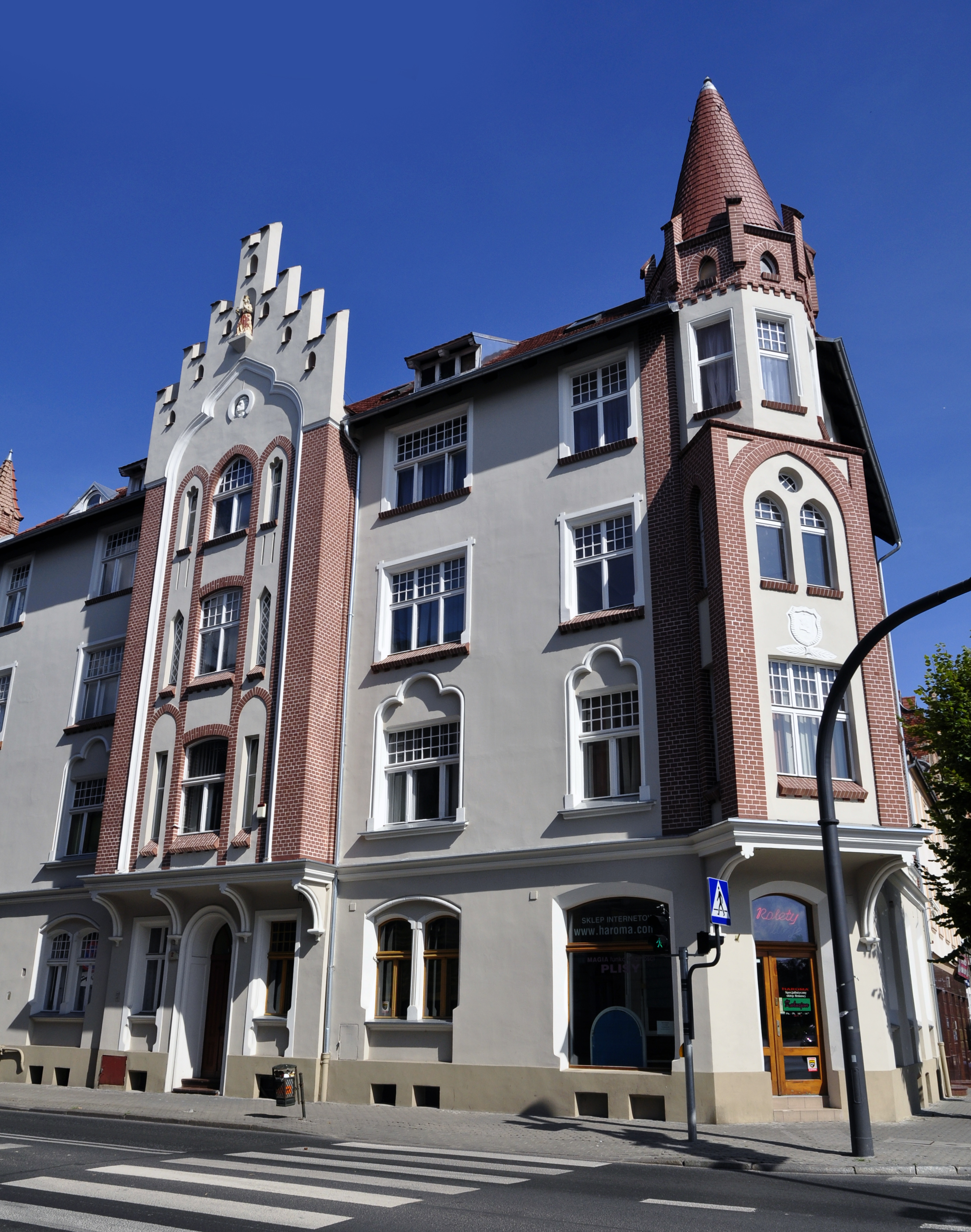
Elevation on Królowej Jadwigi Street

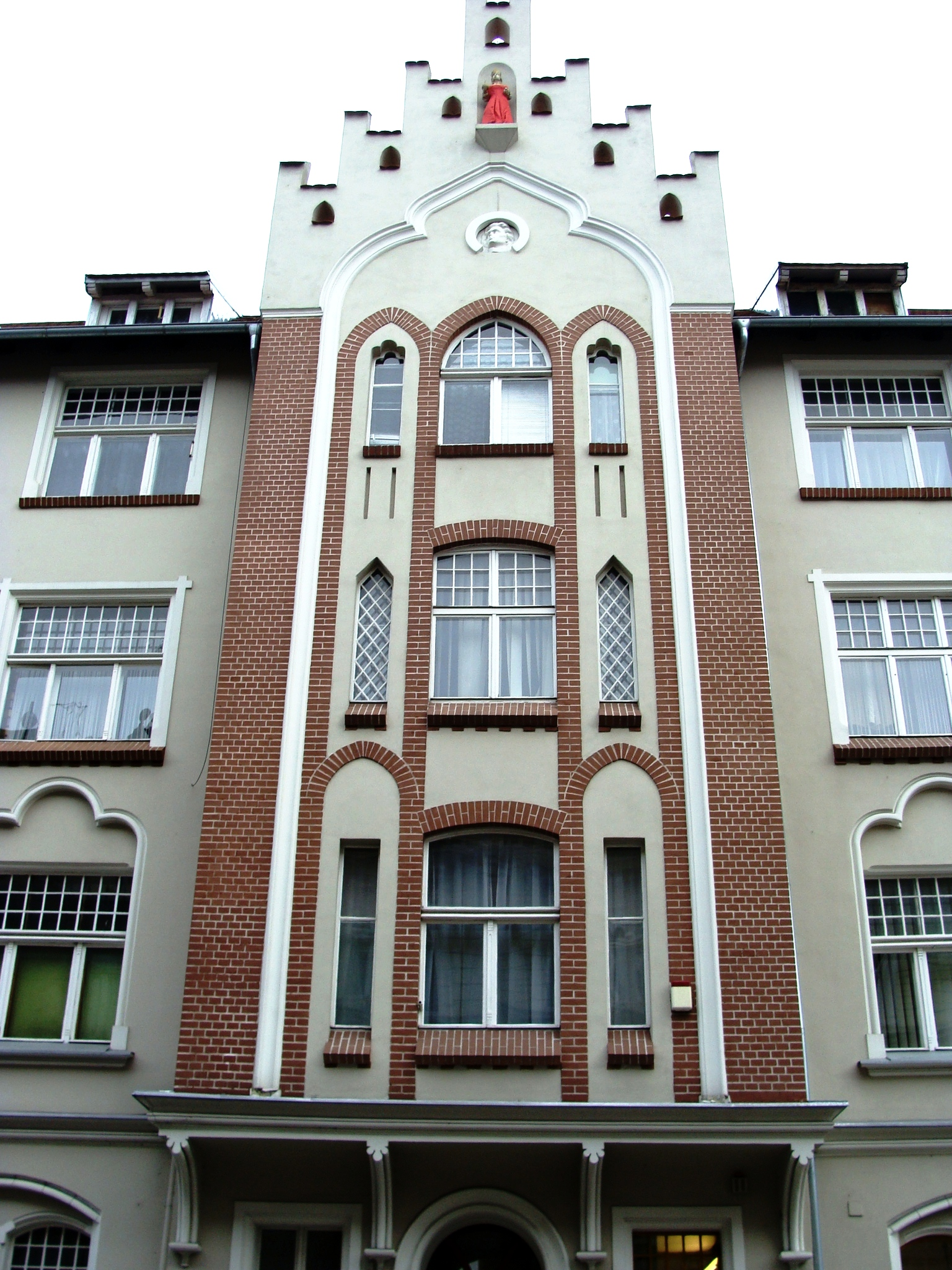
Bay window on the street

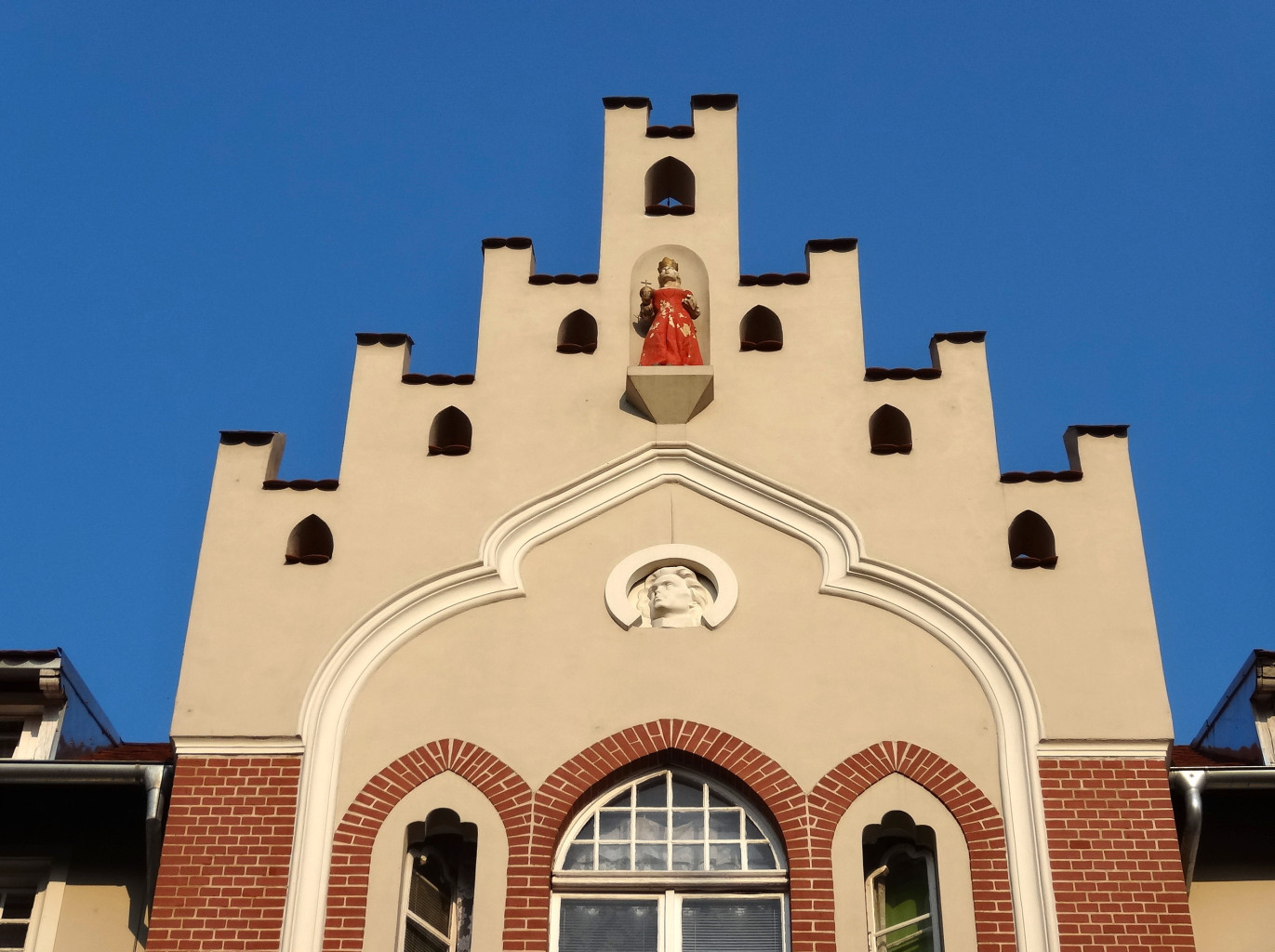
Details of the sculptures on the crow-stepped gable

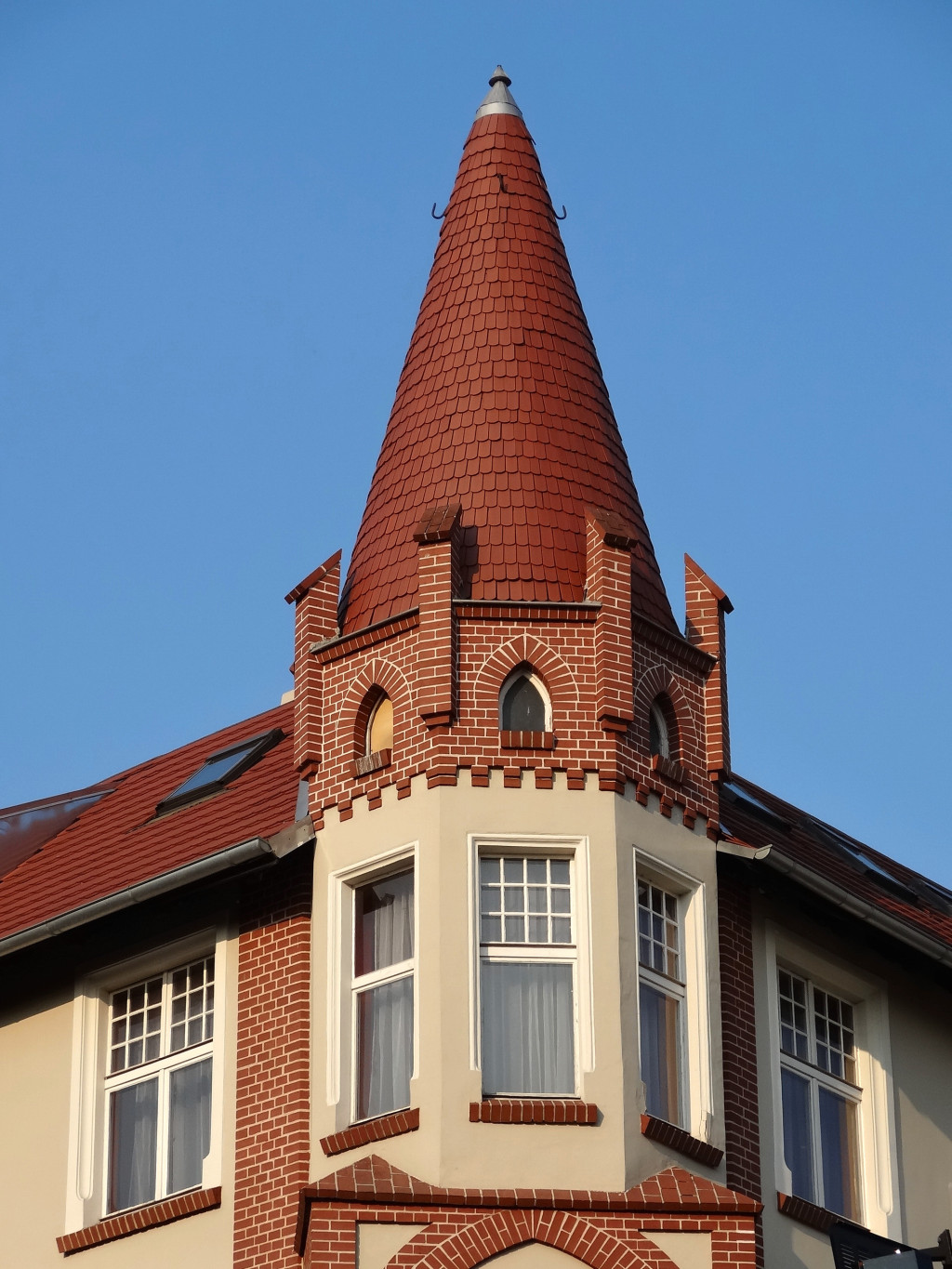
Detail of the medieval style corner tower

Tenement at 16

1906–1907, Art Nouveau

Registered on Kuyavian-Pomeranian Heritage list Nr.727946, A/1535 (23 July 2009)

This building had as first landlord Gottlob Götting, an ex-carpenter, then a rentier, who also owned other tenements in the same street (at 18, 28 and 30).

The facade underwent a full overhaul in the late 2018, underlining Art Nouveau features and stuccoed motifs.

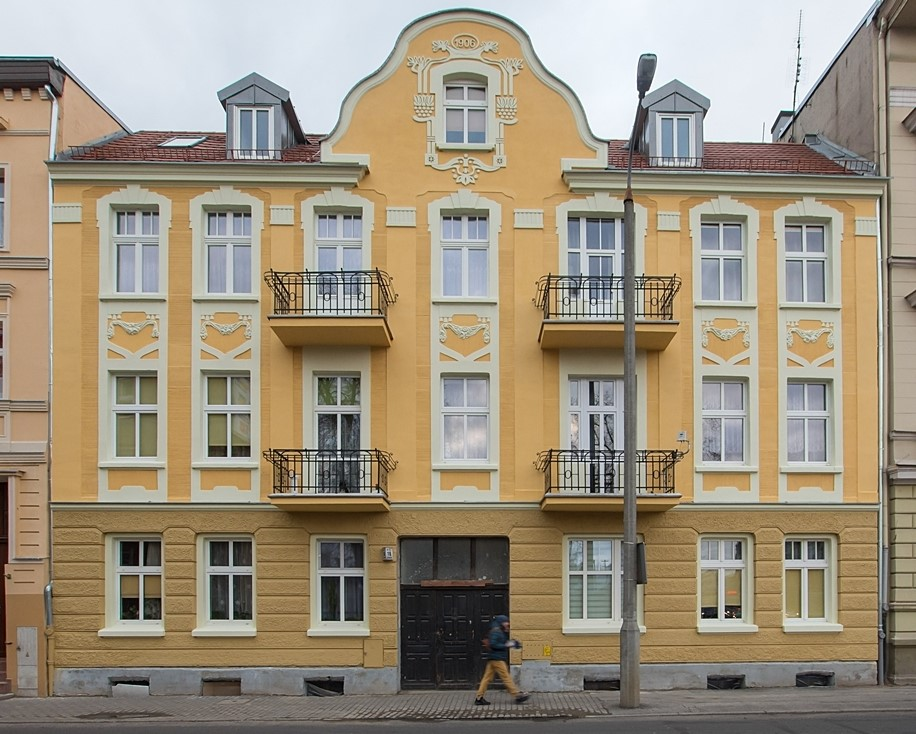
Renovated elevation at 16

Tenement at 17

1875–1900, Eclecticism

First recorded landlord was Johann Pfefferkorn, a teacher.

Main elevation on the street displays an eclectic architectural style.

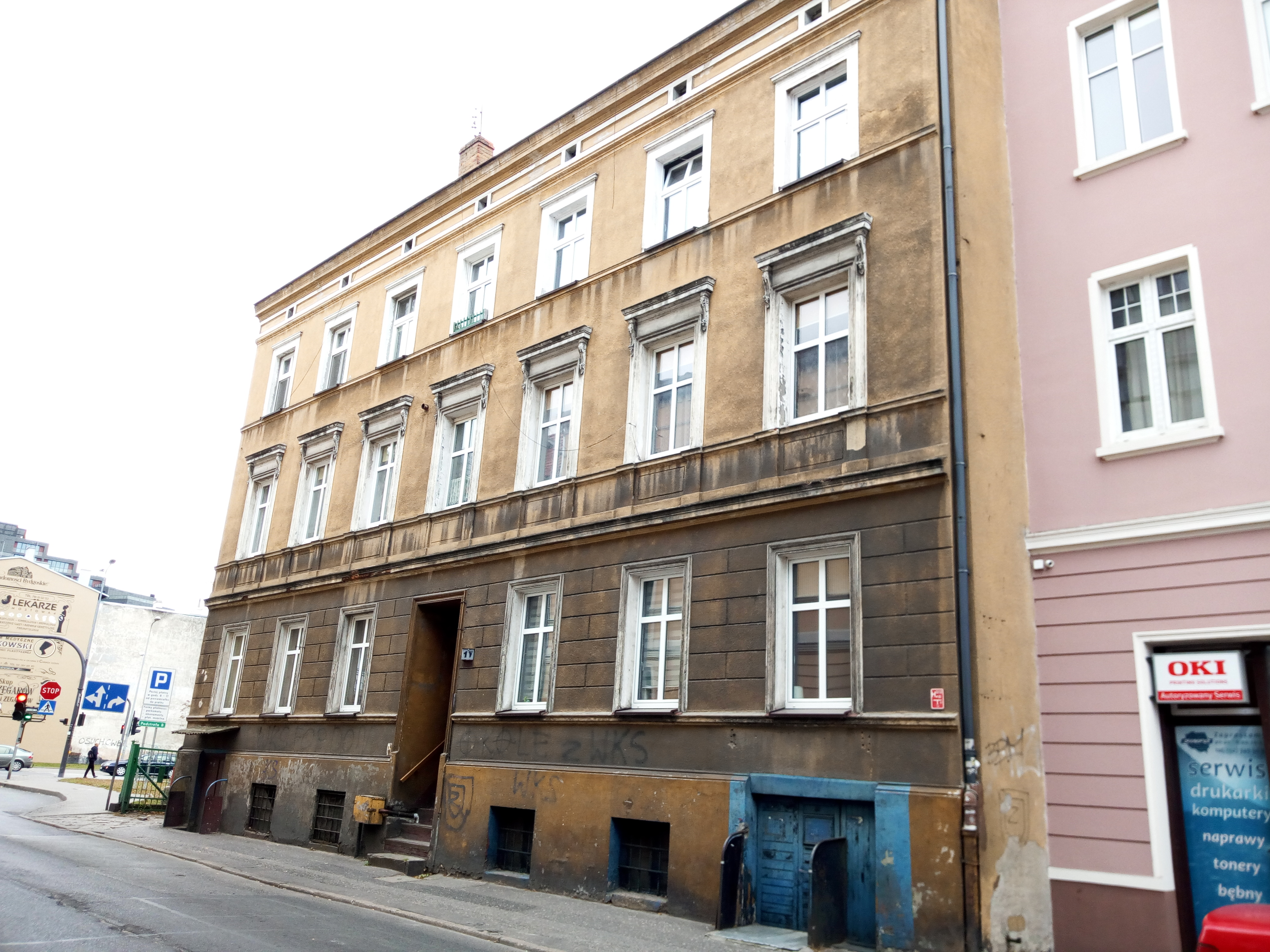
Main frontage from the street

Götting tenement at 18

1882, Eclecticism

Gottlob Götting, a carpenter at the time, acquired this building in the 1880s, located then at ALbertstraße 23. Later on, he commissioned or bought several tenements in the street (at 16, 28 and 30).

Main elevation on the street displays an eclectic architectural style, mirroring 17's facade.

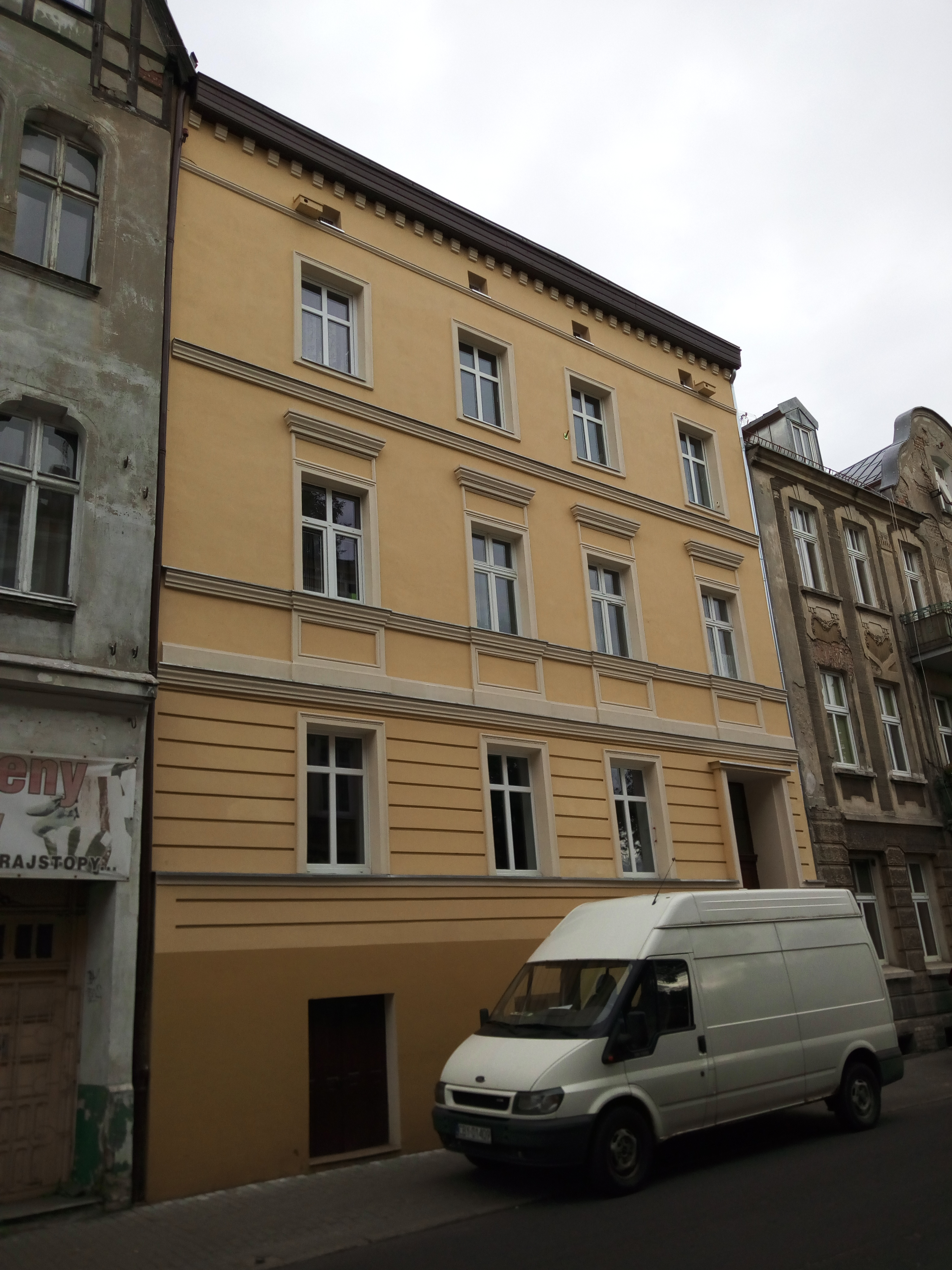
Main elevation

Tenement at 19

1906–1907, Art Nouveau

Julius Thiede, a butcher, is recorded as the first landlord of this building. At the time, the address was Albertstraße 11.

The facade underwent a renovation in 2018, underlining Art Nouveau stuccoed motifs.

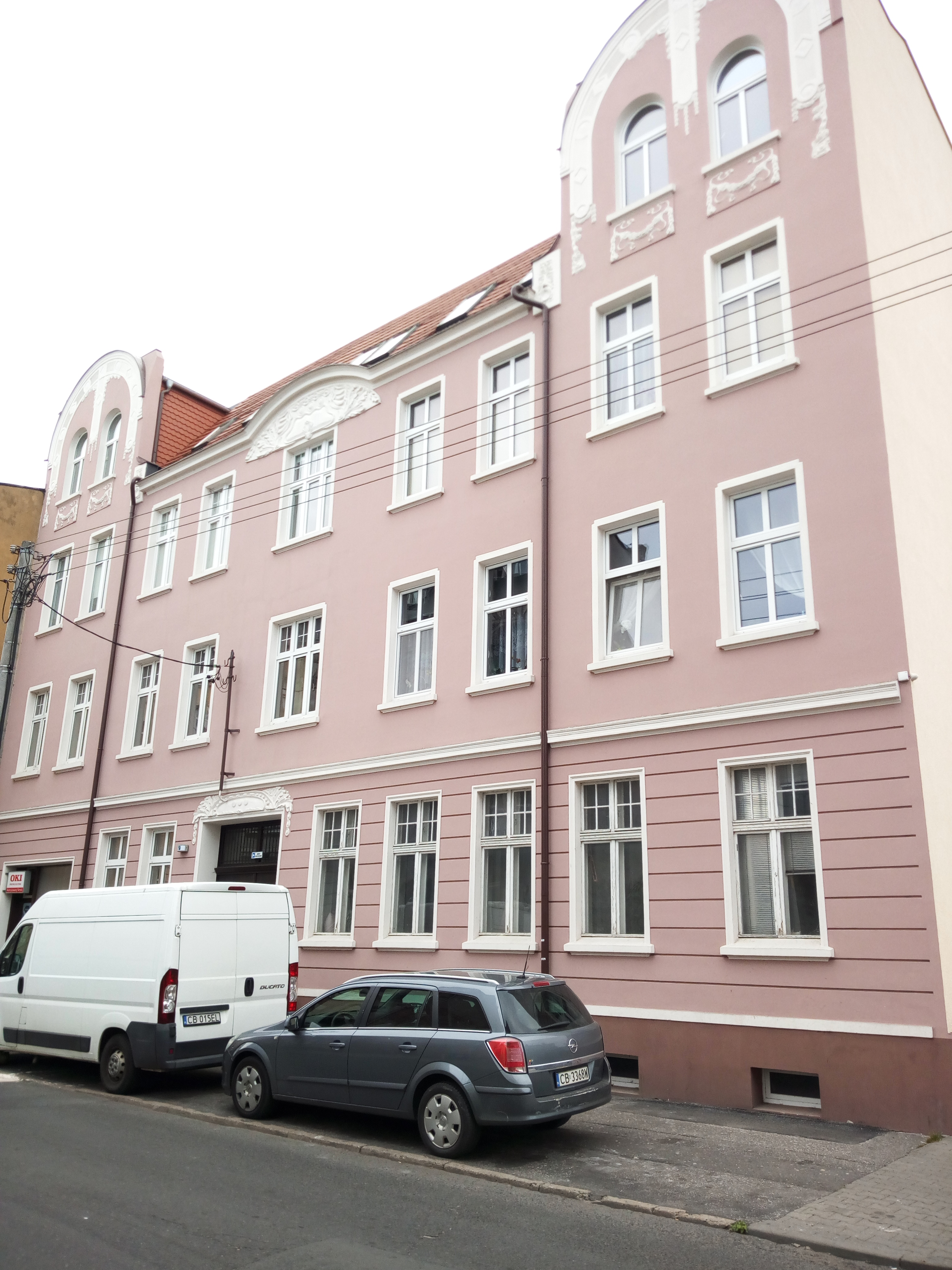
Frontage on the street

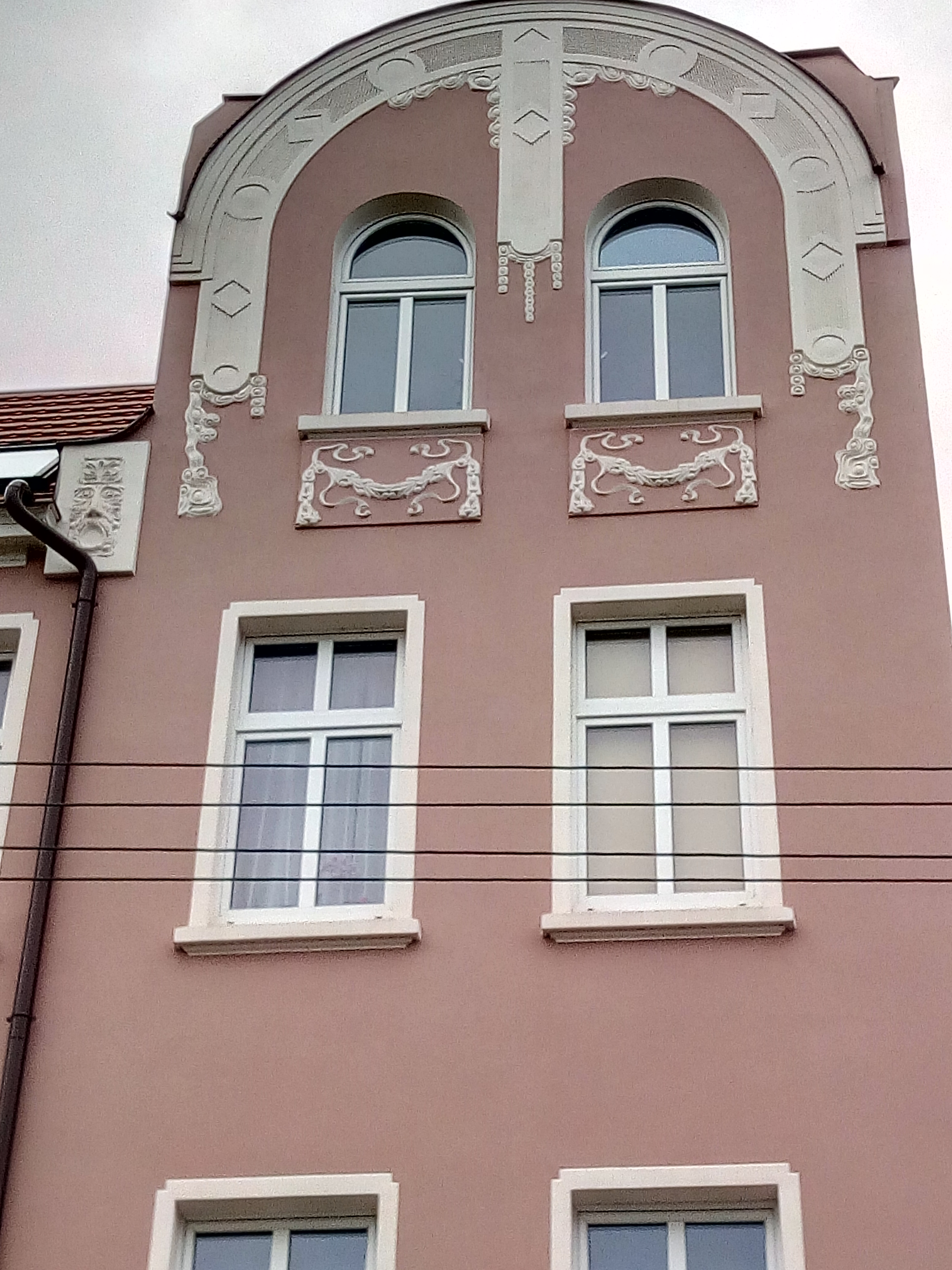
Motifs details

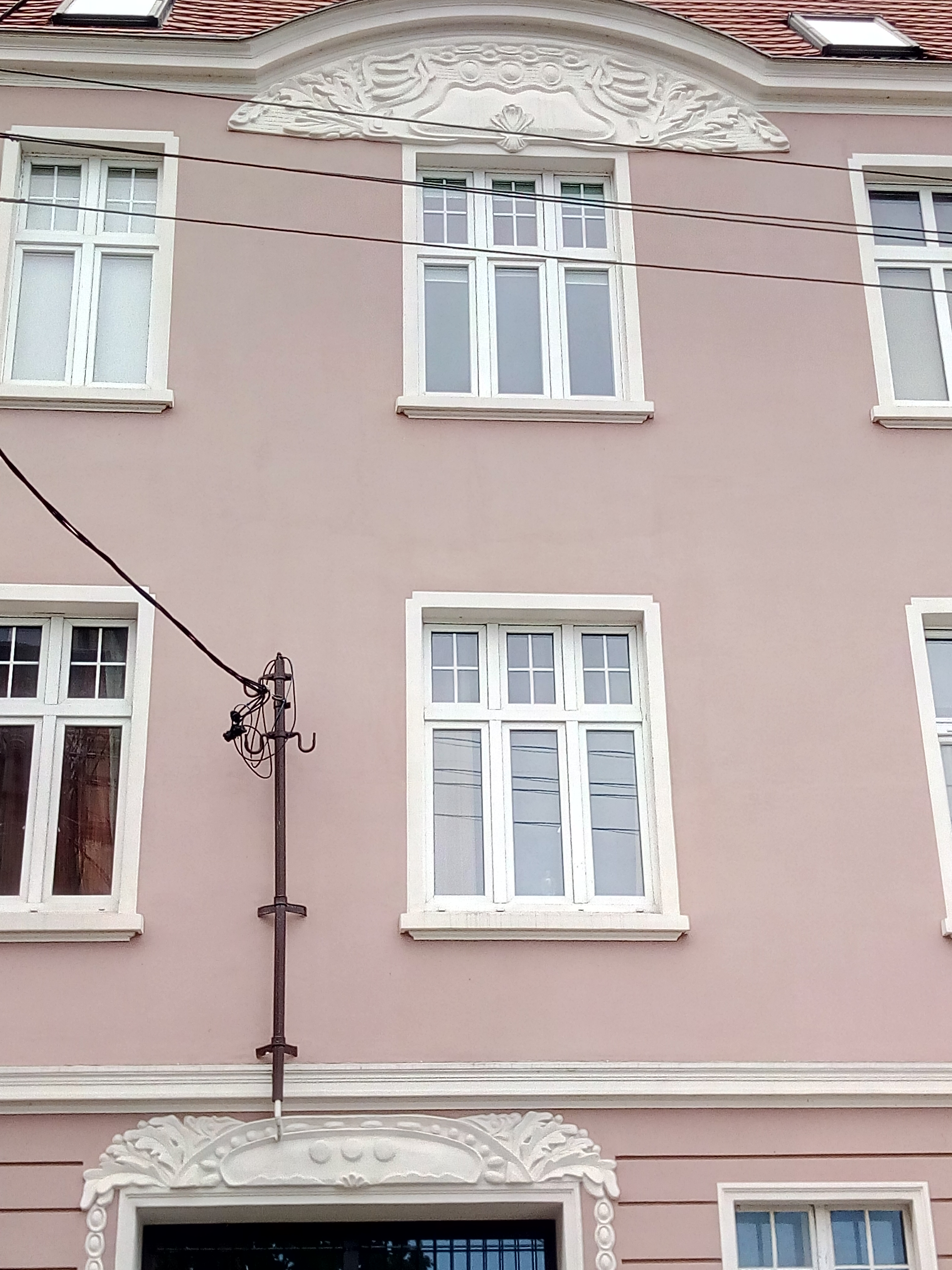
Stuccoed decoration

Viktor Petrikowski tenement at 20

1903–1904, Art Nouveau

Registered on Kuyavian-Pomeranian Heritage list Nr.601294, A/823/1-2 (25 May 1994)

This building has been commissioned and designed by a local carpenter and construction entrepreneur, Viktor Petrikowski. A year later, he built another tenement, at the corner of Zamoyskiego and 20 Stycznia 1920 Streets. He kept ownership of Garbary street's edifice until the end of WWI.

Registered on the voivodship heritage list, the edifice is almost derelict. However, one can still appreciate various Art Nouveau features, from the decorated arched frame, to the vegetal-and-figure motifs, to the wattle and daub upper part of the elevation and dormers.

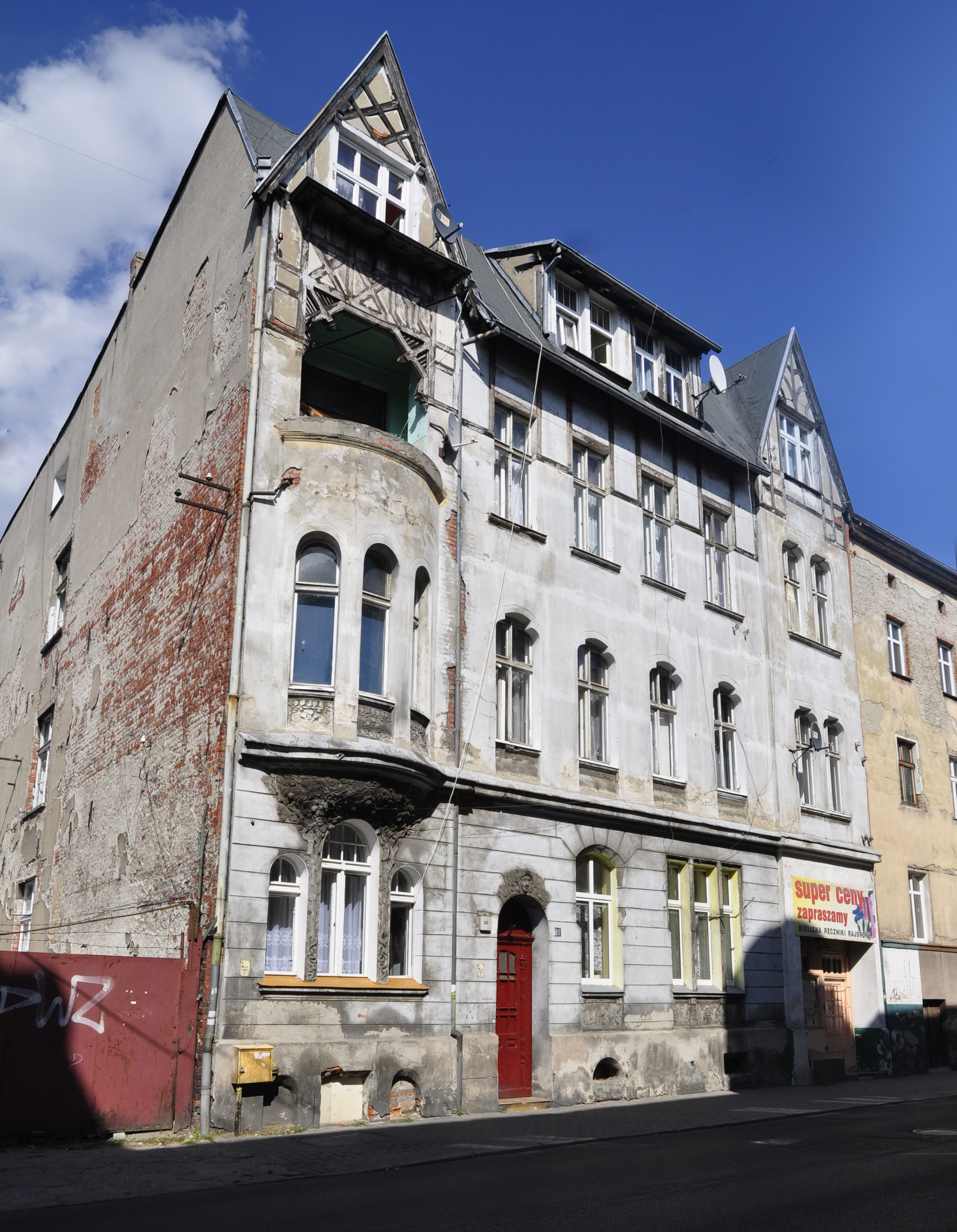
Main frontage from the street

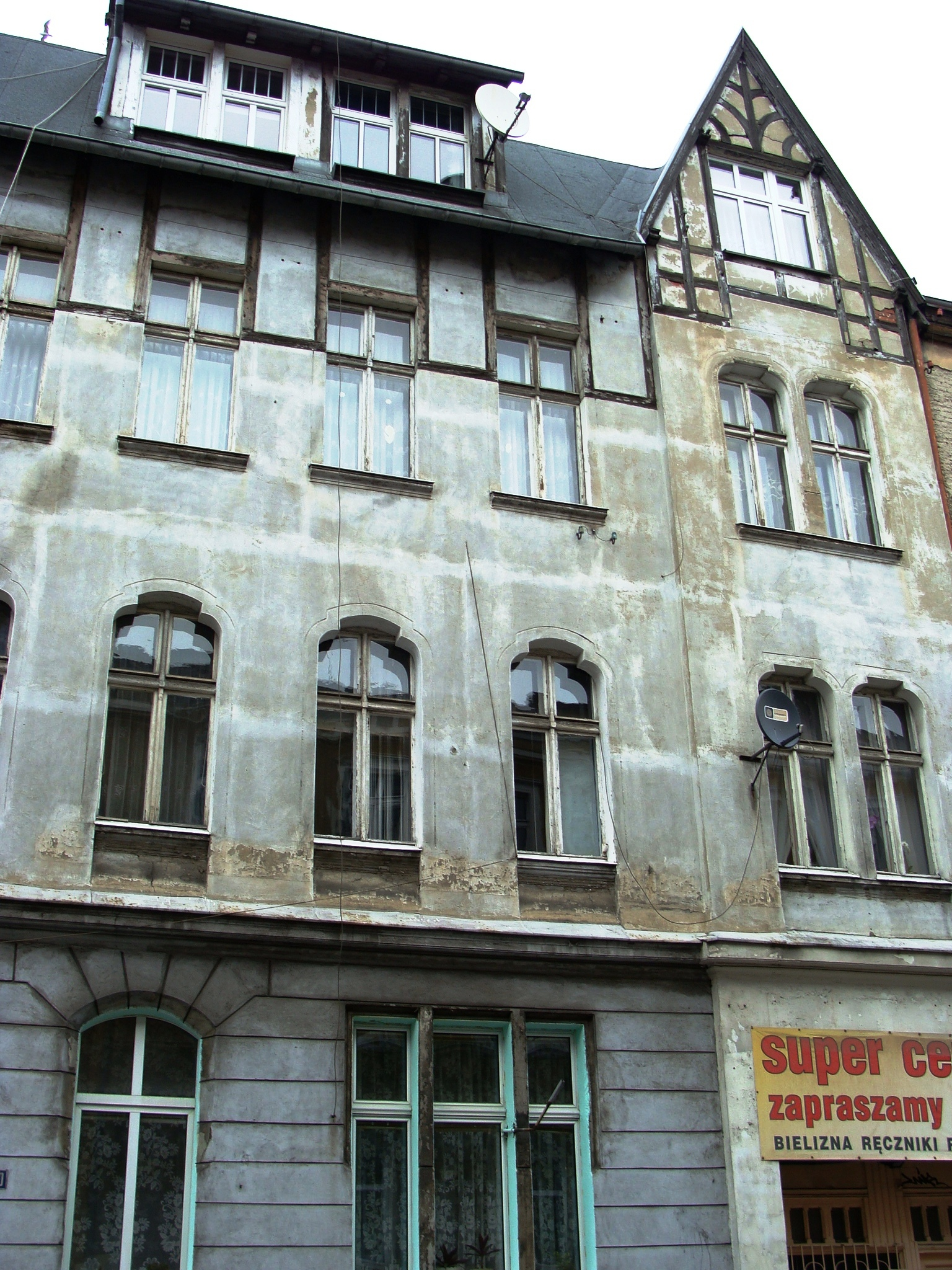
Wattle and daub gable

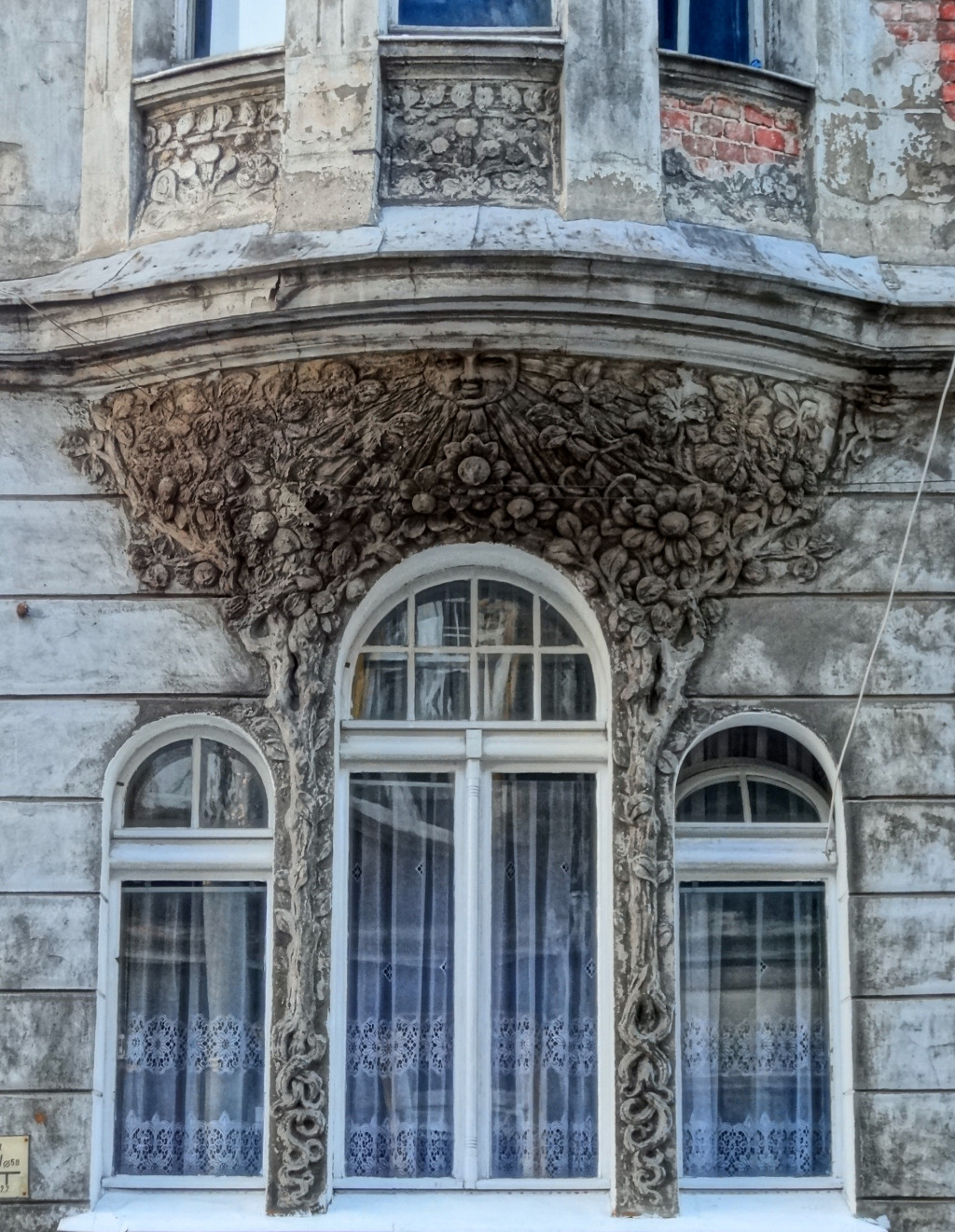
Stucco at the bottom of the bay window

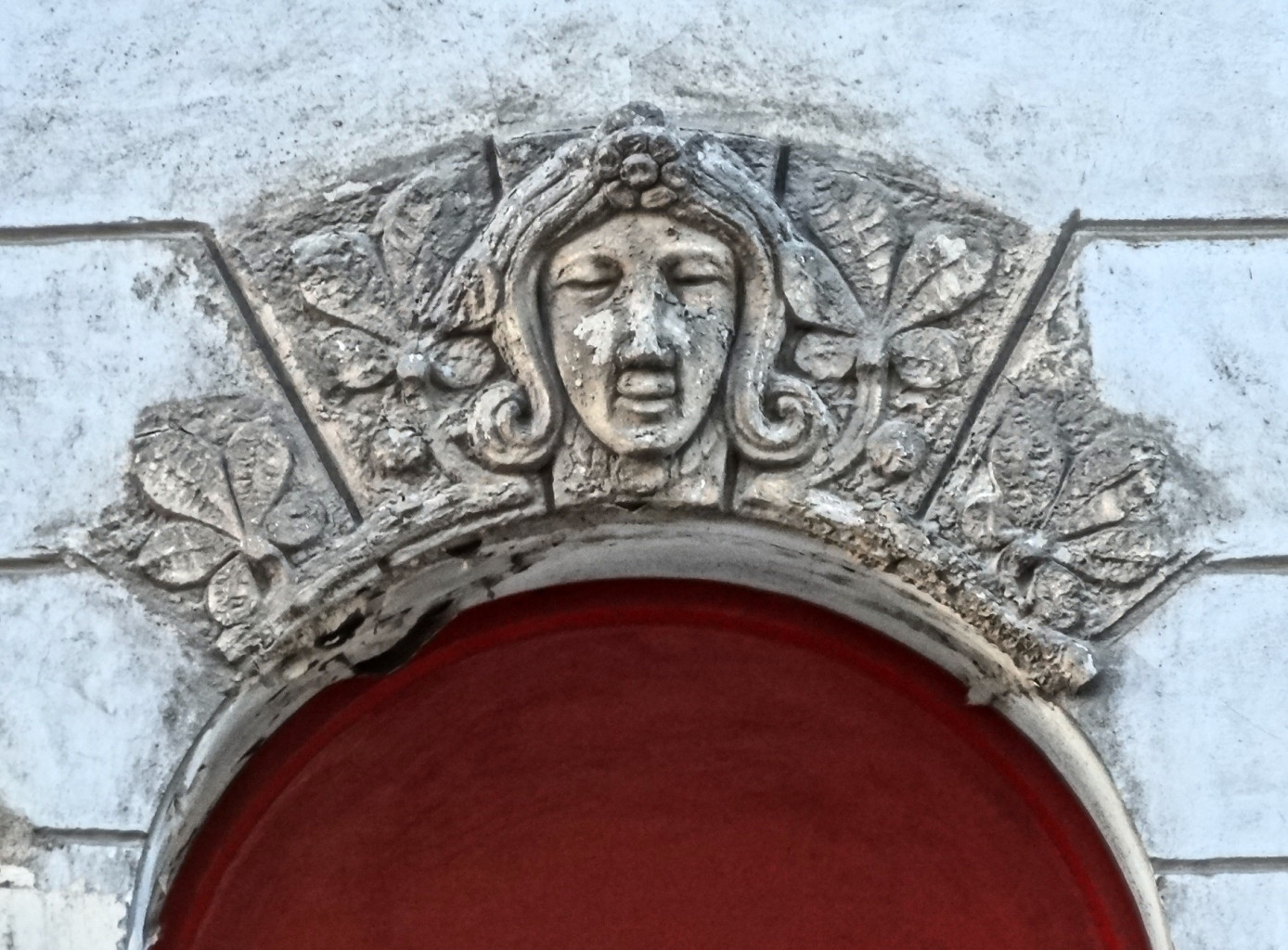
Door frame decoration

Tenements at 26/28

1894 (28), 1906-1907 (26), Eclecticism

Both tenements have been commissioned and managed by the city Housing Association (German: Wohnungs Verein). Indeed, both edifices had on average 19 to 20 tenants.

Main frontages, restored in 2018–2019, exhibit a classical eclectic architectural style. 28's facade, however, exposes more interesting features.

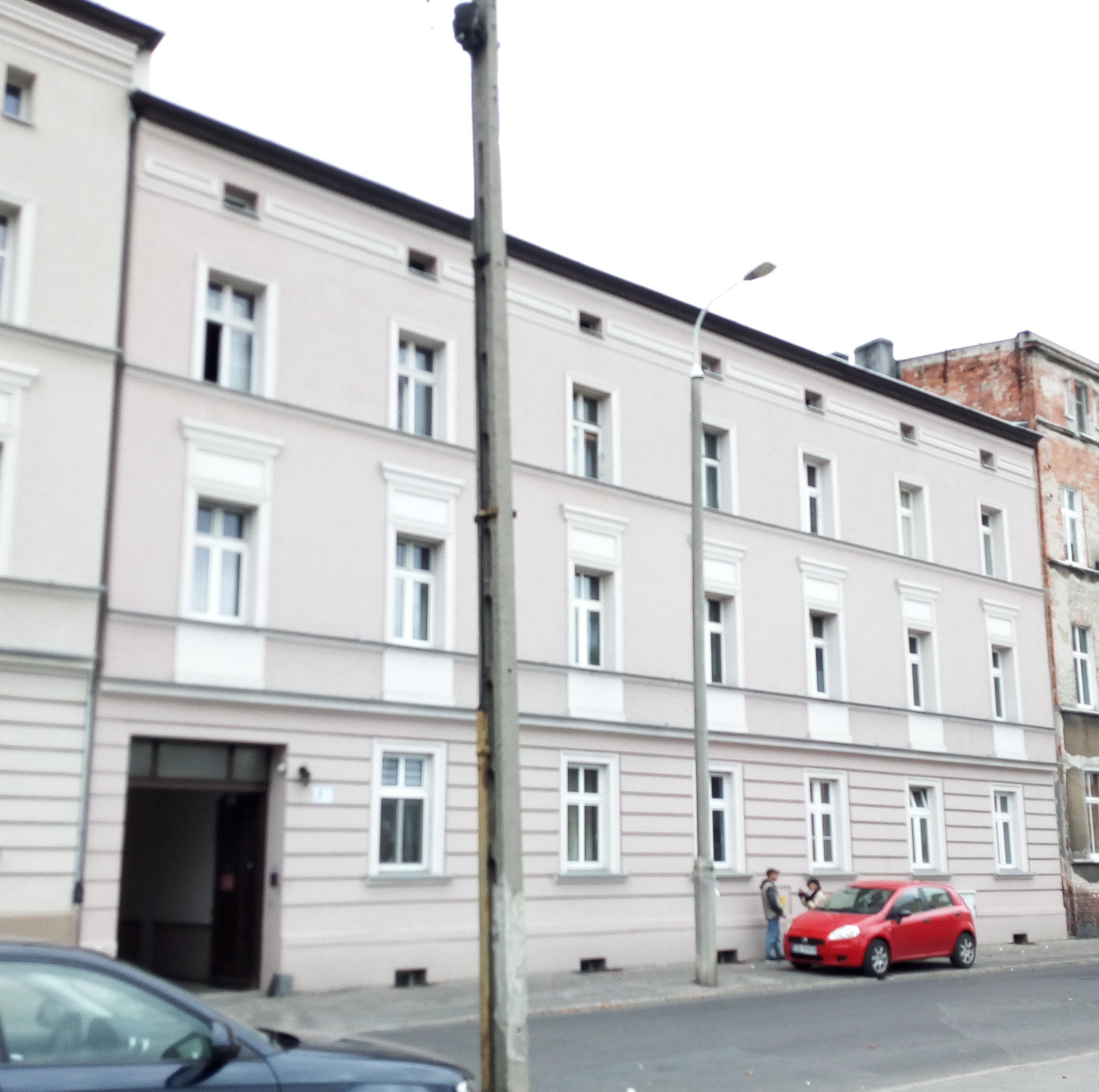
26 main elevation

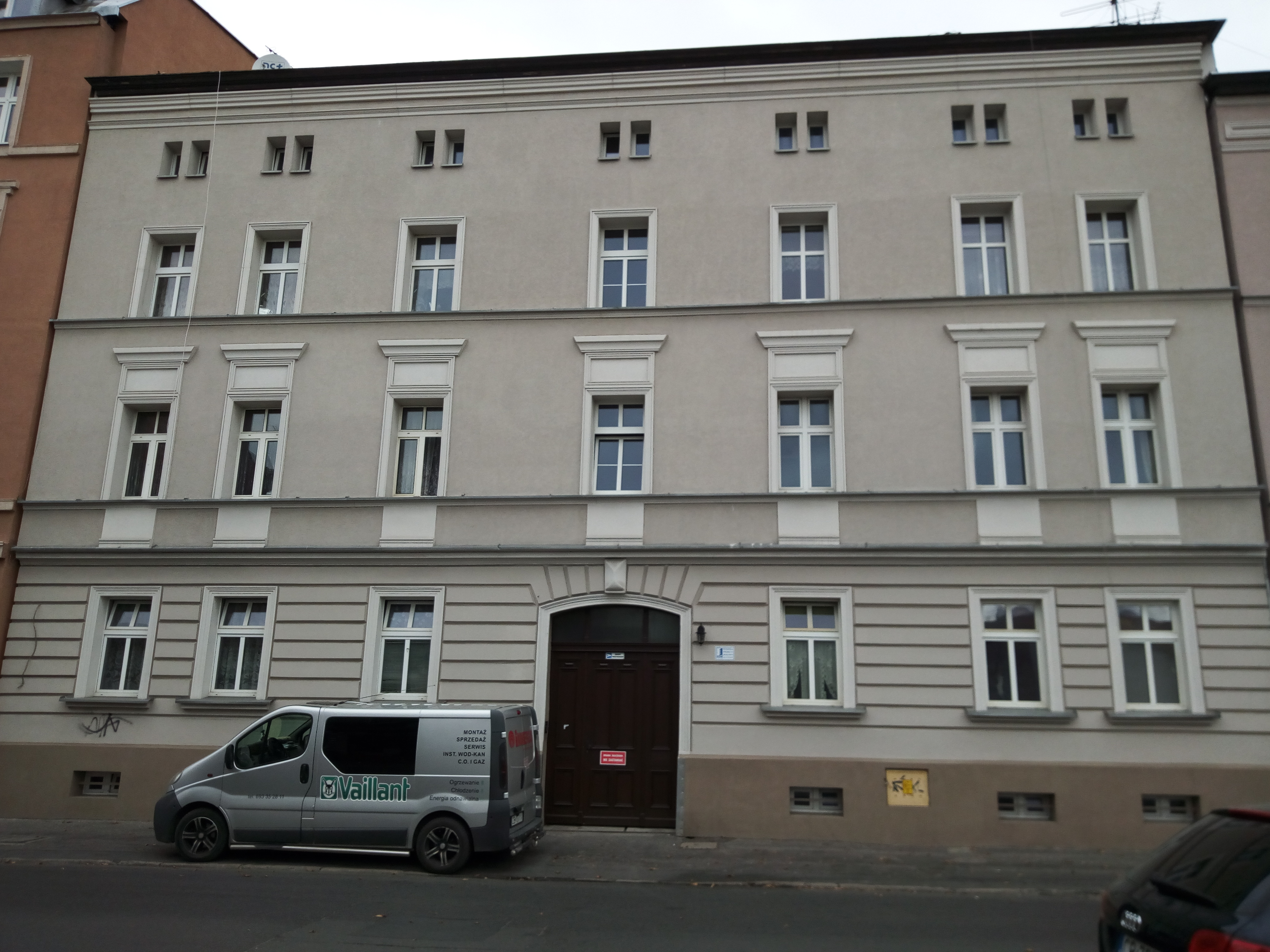
28 frontage

Tenement at 27

1893, Eclecticism

The building has been first owned by a painter, Hugo ßomrencke. Surprisingly enough, it is today famous for its mural, representing Marian Rejewski. The picture has been realized in 2018 by students from the UTP University of Sciences and Technology in Bydgoszcz (Polish: Uniwersytet Technologiczno-Przyrodniczy im. Jana i Jędrzeja Śniadeckich w Bydgoszczy, UTP).

The main frontage, in need of a clean up, features eclectic style.

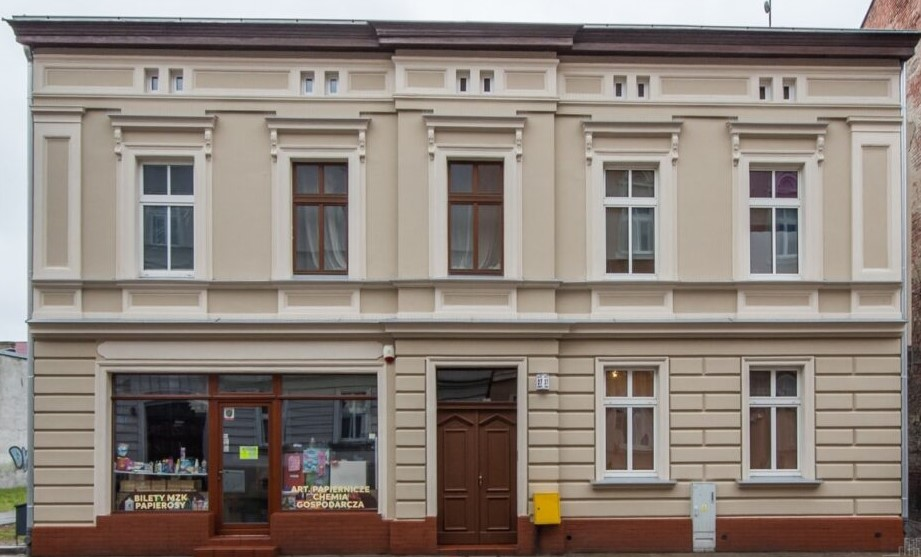
House view from the street

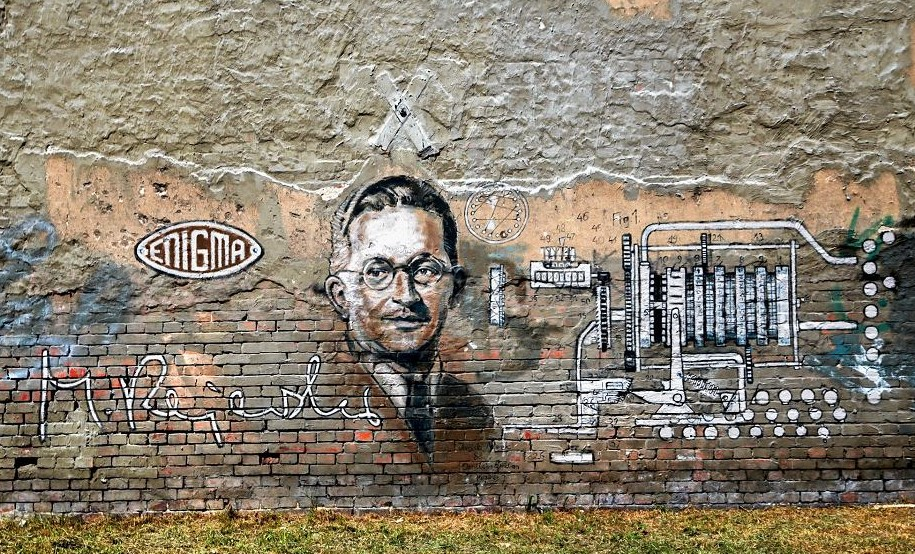
Marian Rejewski's mural at 27

Tenement at 29, corner with Jackowskiego street

1893, Eclecticism

August Götting, a carpenter and a relative of Nr.16's owner, was the commissioner of this tenement, which he never inhabited.

Both facades exhibit eclectic features: bossage, openings with pediments and corbel table on top.

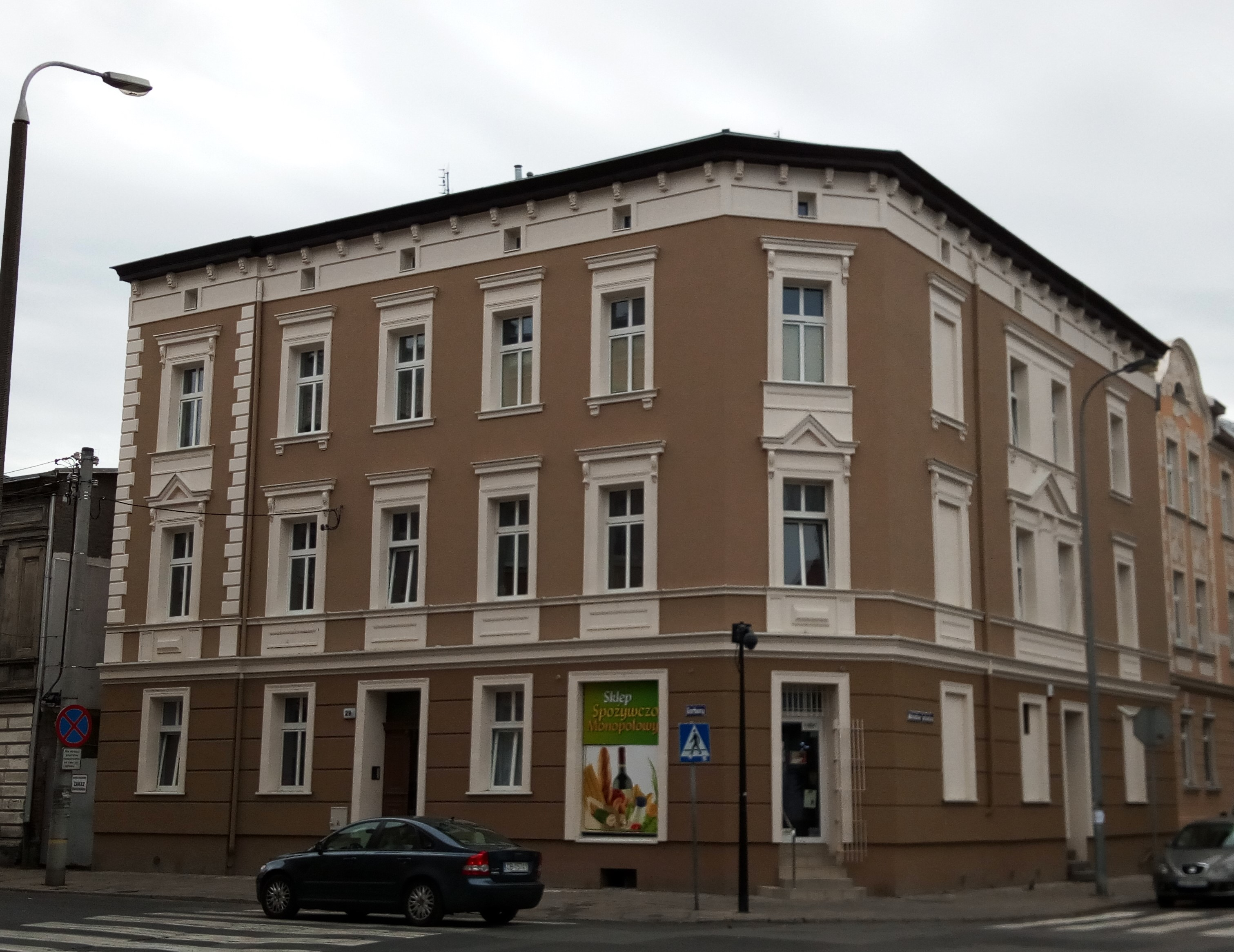
Main view from the street

Tenement at 30, corner with Jackowskiego street

1906, Eclecticism

Like 29, the landlord of this tenement, Mr Junker, a merchant, never lived in his property.

Very similar to 29's elevation, Nr.30 displays a bay window on its corner, together with several additional levels and dormers on the top.

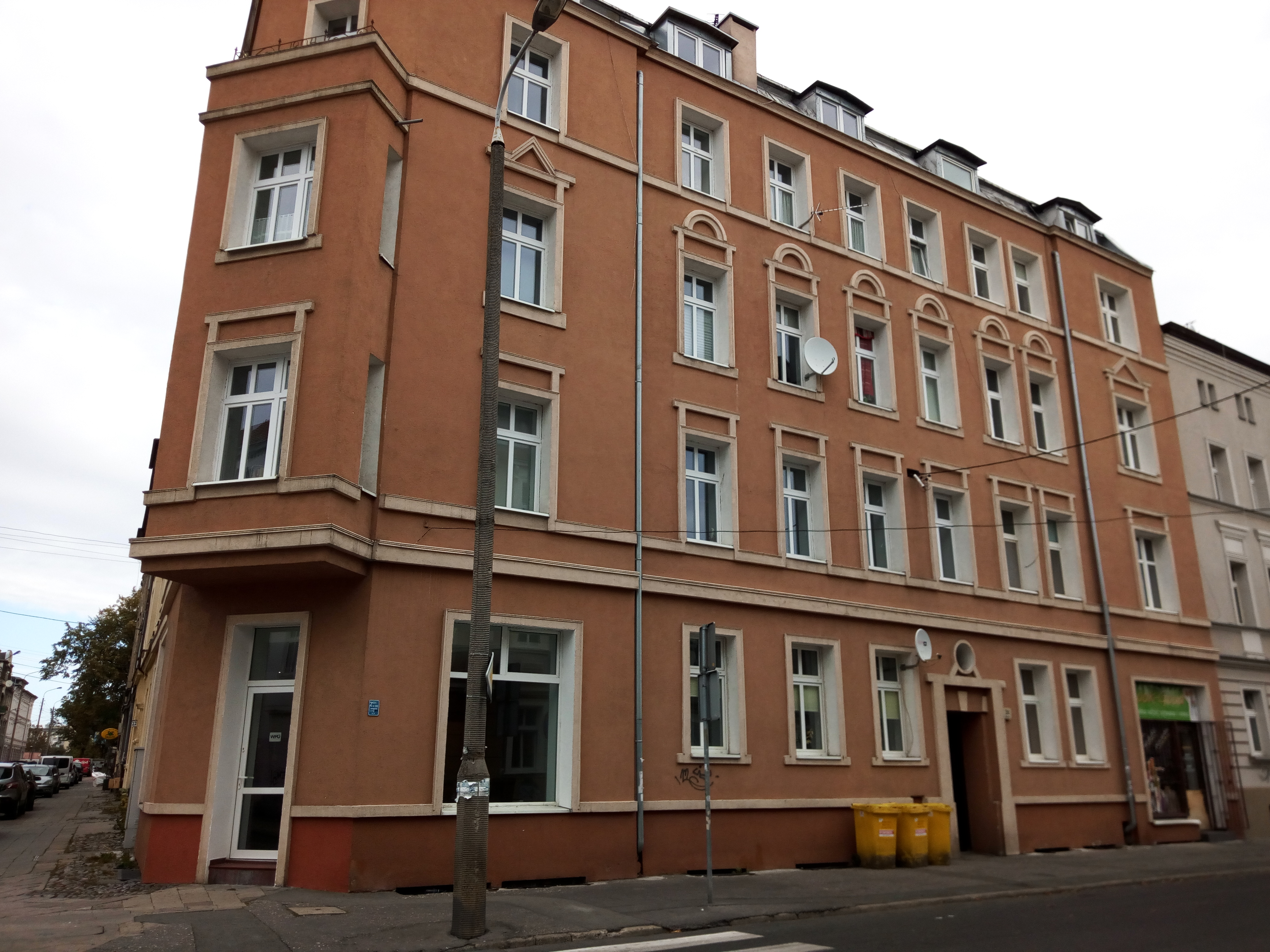
Main view from Garbary street

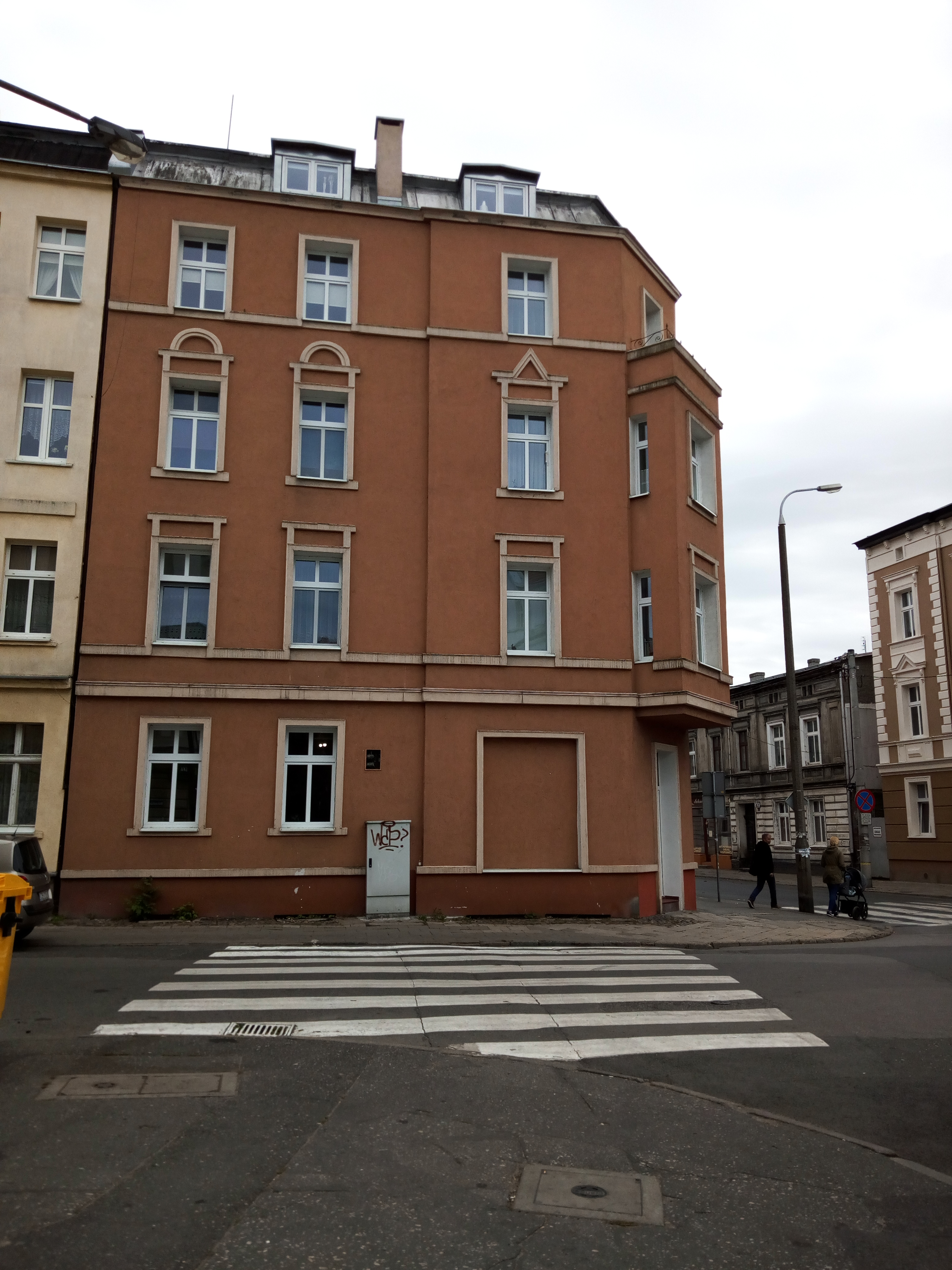
Frontage onto Jackowskiego street

== See also ==
- Ludwig Buchholz's tannery in Bydgoszcz
- Photochemical Factory "Foton", Bydgoszcz
- Królowej Jadwigi Street in Bydgoszcz
- Marshal Ferdinand Foch Street in Bydgoszcz
- Bydgoszcz

== Bibliography ==
- (in Polish) Agnieszka, Wysocka= (2004). Ul. Garbary 2 – dawna willa Buchholza. Bydgoszcz w stronę Okola. Bydgoszcz: Urząd Miasta Bydgoszczy – Rada Osiedla Okole. ISBN 8392172507.
- (in Polish) Agnieszka, Wysocka= (2004). kominek w dawnej willi Buchholza. Bydgoszcz w stronę Okola. Bydgoszcz: Urząd Miasta Bydgoszczy – Rada Osiedla Okole. ISBN 8392172507.
- (in Polish) Brakowski, Konrad (1973). Bez fotografii ani rusz... Kalendarz Bydgoski. Bydgoszcz: Towarzystwo Miłośników Miasta Bydgoszczy. pp. 154–157..
