= Władysława Łokietka street in Bydgoszcz =

Street in Bydgoszcz, Poland

Władysława Łokietka street
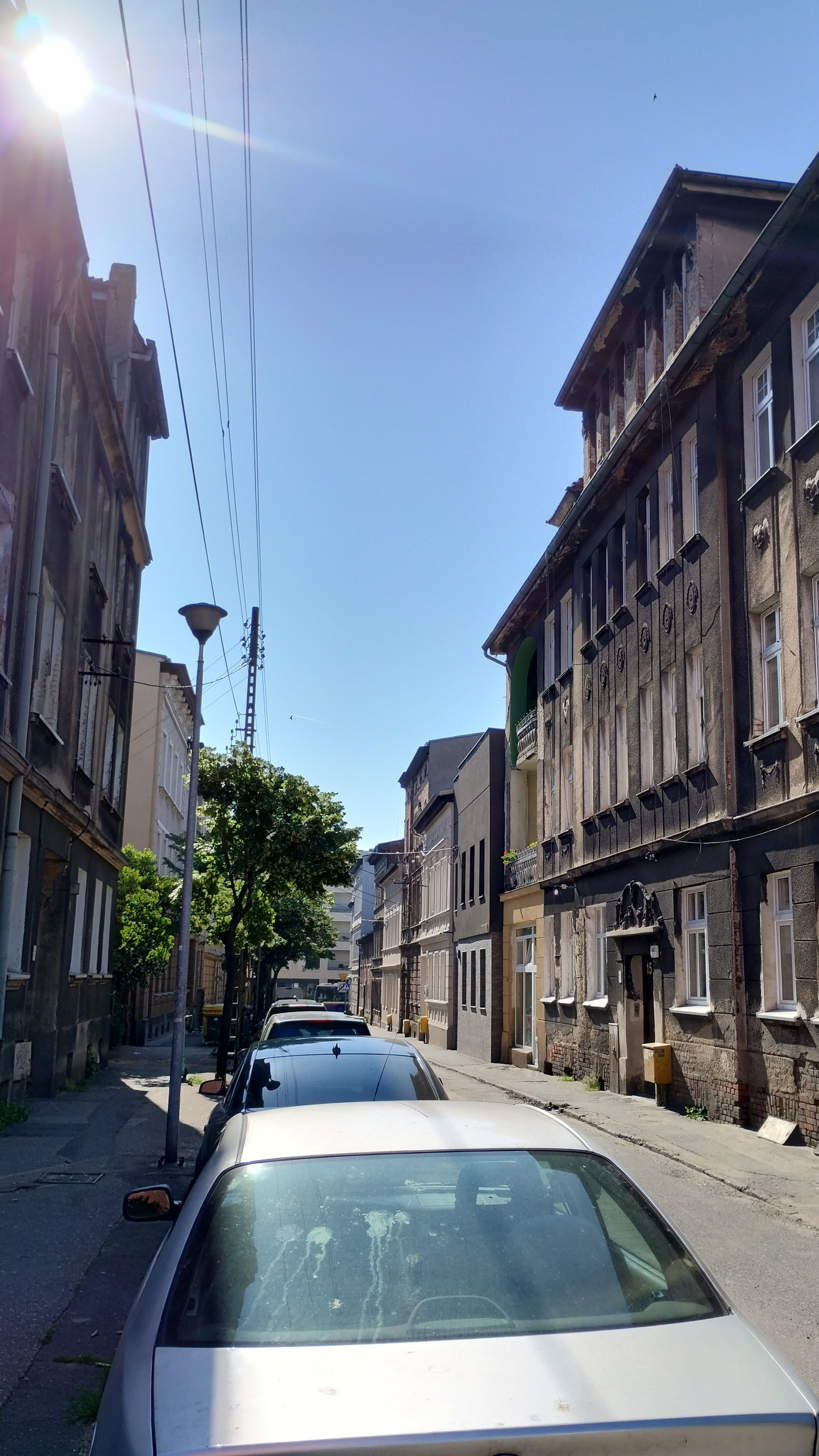
- Łokietka street view to the east

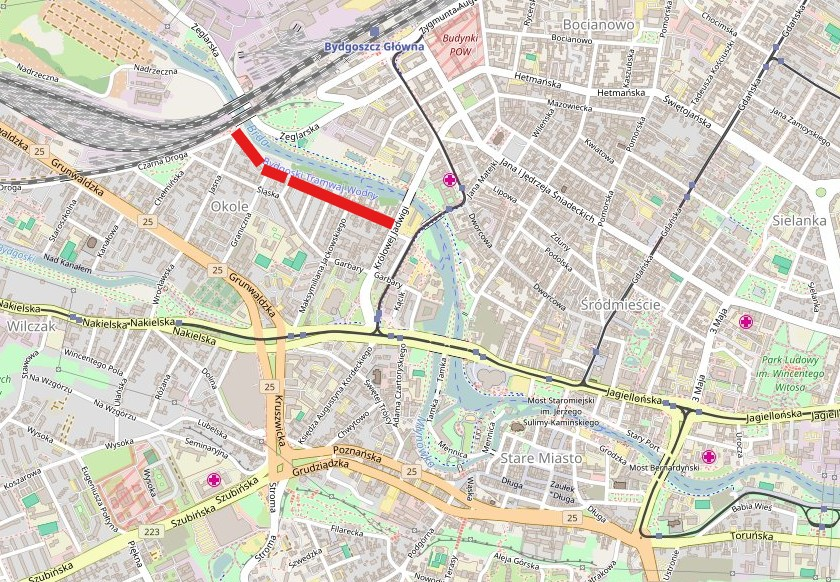
- Władysława Łokietka street highlighted on a map
- Native name: Ulica Władysława Łokietka w Bydgoszczy (Polish)
- Former name: Kanalwerder / Prinzenstraße / Sickingentraße
- Part of: Okole district
- Namesake: Władysław I Łokietek
- Owner: City of Bydgoszcz
- Length: 820 m (2,690 ft)
- Width: 8 metres (26 ft)
- Location: Bydgoszcz, Poland
- Coordinates: 53°07′48″N 17°59′21″E
- Major junctions: Królowej Jadwigi Street, Maksymiliana Jackowskiego street, Długosza street and Siemiradzkiego street

Construction
- Construction start: Late 1860s
- Completed: 1910

Łokietka street is a path in the city of Bydgoszcz, Poland. Its edifices display a mix of eclectic architectural facades and highlight the urbanization past of the city.

== Location and naming ==
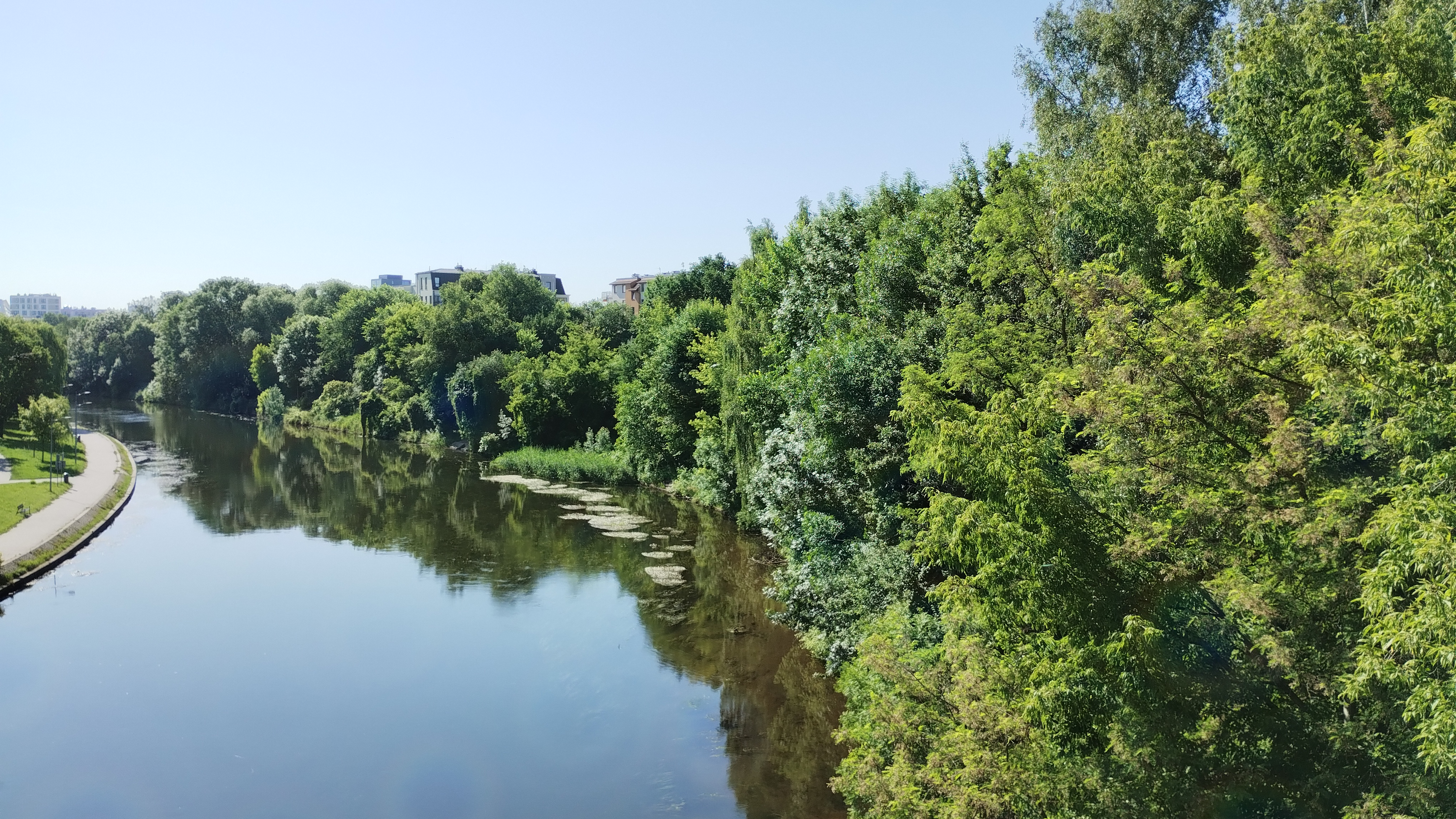
View of the river side of Lokietka street

Łokietka street is located in downtown Bydgoszcz, in the Okole district. It runs along an approximately east–west axis, stemming from Królowej Jadwigi street and following the southern bank of the Brda river. Rather narrow for the area (one-way street), it is about 820 m long. Thanks to the avenue orientation, all the even street-numbered buildings have a direct access to the Brda river on their backyards.

Through history, the street bore the following names:

- Till 1870, "Kanal werder" (Canal peninsula);
- 1870–1920, "Prinzenstraße";
- 1920–1939, "Ulica Łokietka";
- 1939–1945, "Sickingen Straße";
- since 1945, "Ulica Łokietka".

The current namesake of the street comes from Władysław I Łokietek, the oldest son of Casimir I of Kuyavia (Kazimierz I Kujawski) and King of Poland from 1320 to 1333.

== History ==
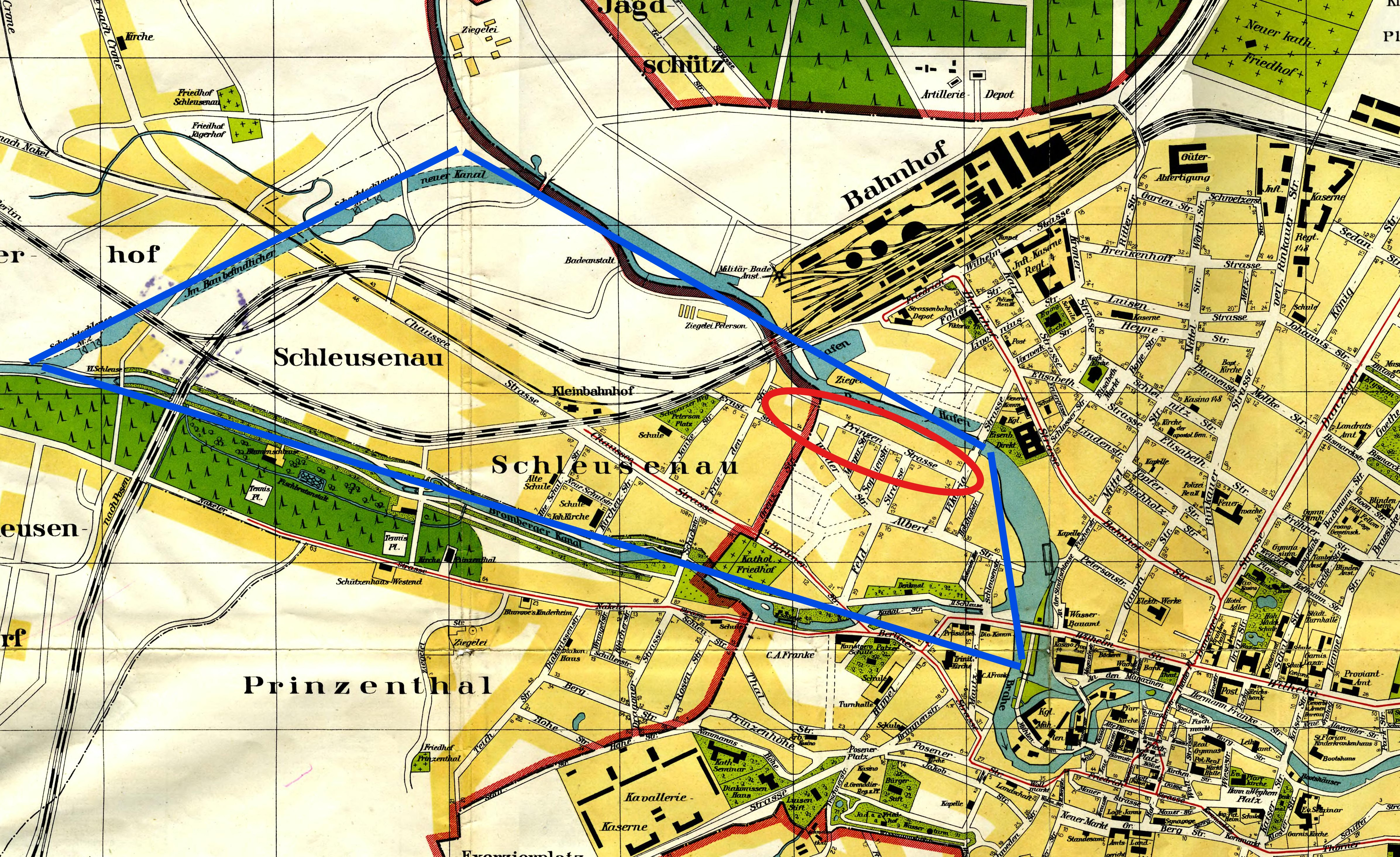
Schleusenau district in blue - Prinzenstrasse in red

During Prussian time (1772–1920), the Okole district where the street is laid was called Kanal werder (Canal peninsula). The term referred to the fact that the triangular area was almost surrounded by water ways: to the south was the Bydgoszcz Canal and to the north the Brda river. The district (renamed Schleusenau) became even an artificial island when a new branch of the Bydgoszcz canal was completed in 1915, locking up the area.

First buildings appears on old maps in the late 1850s, but the first registered residents in address books are only listed in the early 1870s. The arrival of the railway and the waterway activities boosted the development of the area: by 1910, the street completed its expansion.

The district came unscathed from both WWII destruction and soviet-time estate projects. Since the 2010s, the municipal authorities have launched several renovation works in the street. Furthermore, private investors have recently build up properties:

- at 26/28, Riverside Residences;
- at 46, Łokietka 46. A few metres from the place stood -till the mid 19th century- a goat market (Kozi Rynek) and a watering trough for horses. The latter is now exhibited in the open-air waterworks museum of the Las Gdański water supply station in the northern part of the city (Myślęcinek ).

== Main edifices ==
Tenement at 1, corner with 17 Królowej Jadwigi street

1850-1875

Eclecticism, Art Nouveau

This building may be the oldest one in the street, according to the Municipal Register of Historic Monuments. Earliest recorded landlord was Georg Affeldt, a rentier, in 1880. From 1900 to the outbreak of WWII, Franz Budzbon, also owner at 15 Królowej Jadwigi street, had his restaurant located there.

The corner tenement shows early elements of Art Nouveau style, in particular in the remaining motifs of both frontages: a cartouche above the corner entrance displays a man figure, all first level windows boast pediments and crossheads with vegetal motifs or flowered woman heads, in the spirit of Art Nouveau ornamentation. The 2019 overhaul of the building replaced back the statue above the entrance.

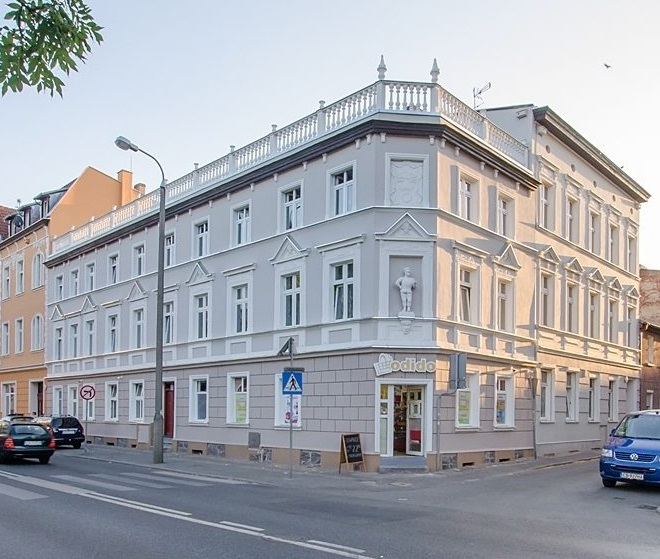
Corner view

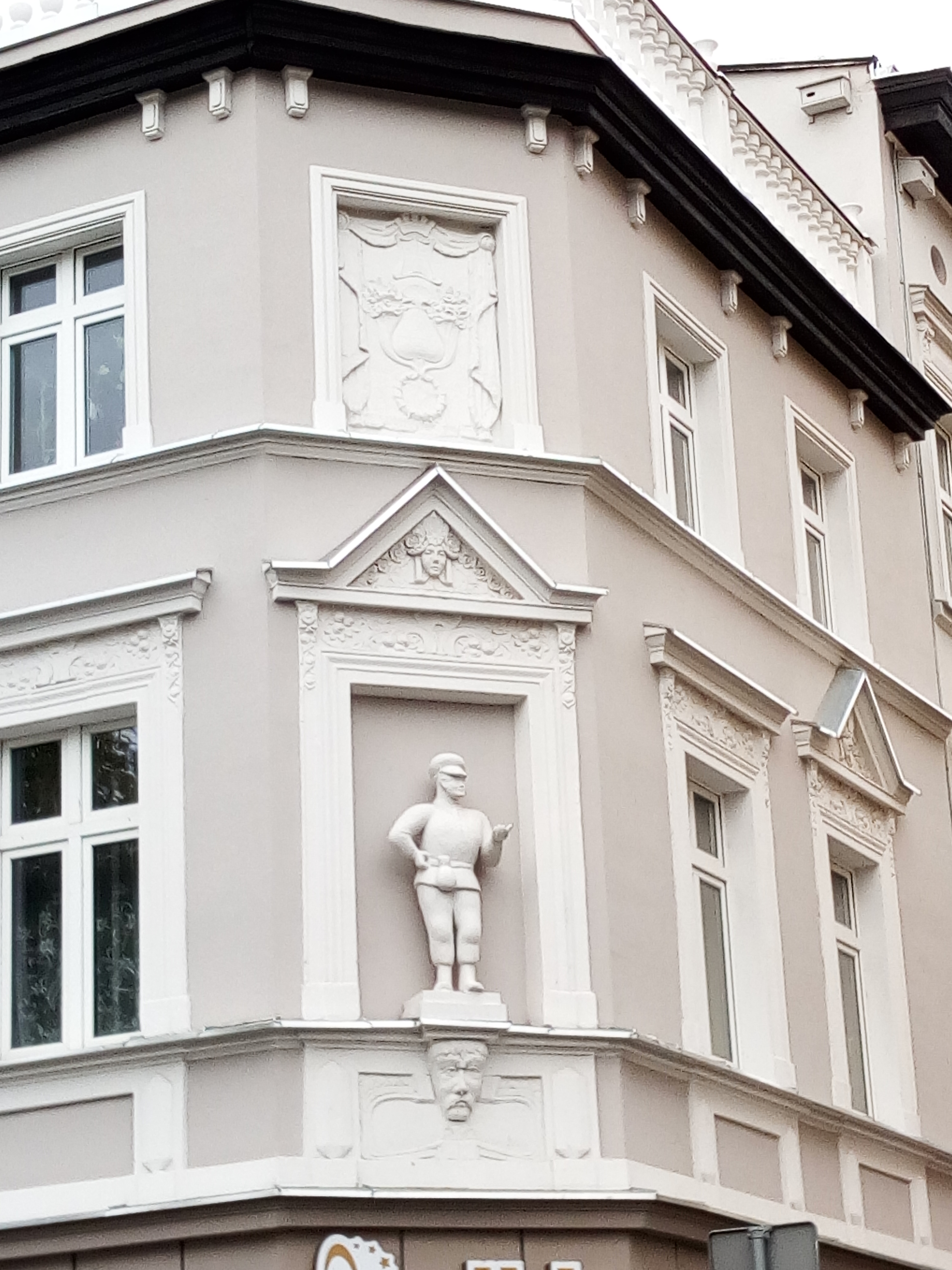
Statue and stuccoes

Tenement at 19 Królowej Jadwigi street, corner with Łokietla street

1875-1900

Neo-Renaissance

This building has been first owned by a rentier, Carl Kaminski in 1894. He still has his initials above the main entrance, held by putti. Carl Kamisnki was also the owner of the building at 21 Królowej Jadwigi street.

This tenement house displays a style inspired by Italian Renaissance. The facade shows bossage, with arched windows on the ground floor. The upper storeys received a rich decoration: stuccoed motifs, pilasters, mascarons, balustrade. The house is crowned with a fourth floor boasting an ornamental table corbel cornice. Two large bay windows break the symmetry of the ensemble, both towering entrances and both with wooden loggias on the second floor. This neo-Renaissance townhouse has been beautifully renovated in 2016.

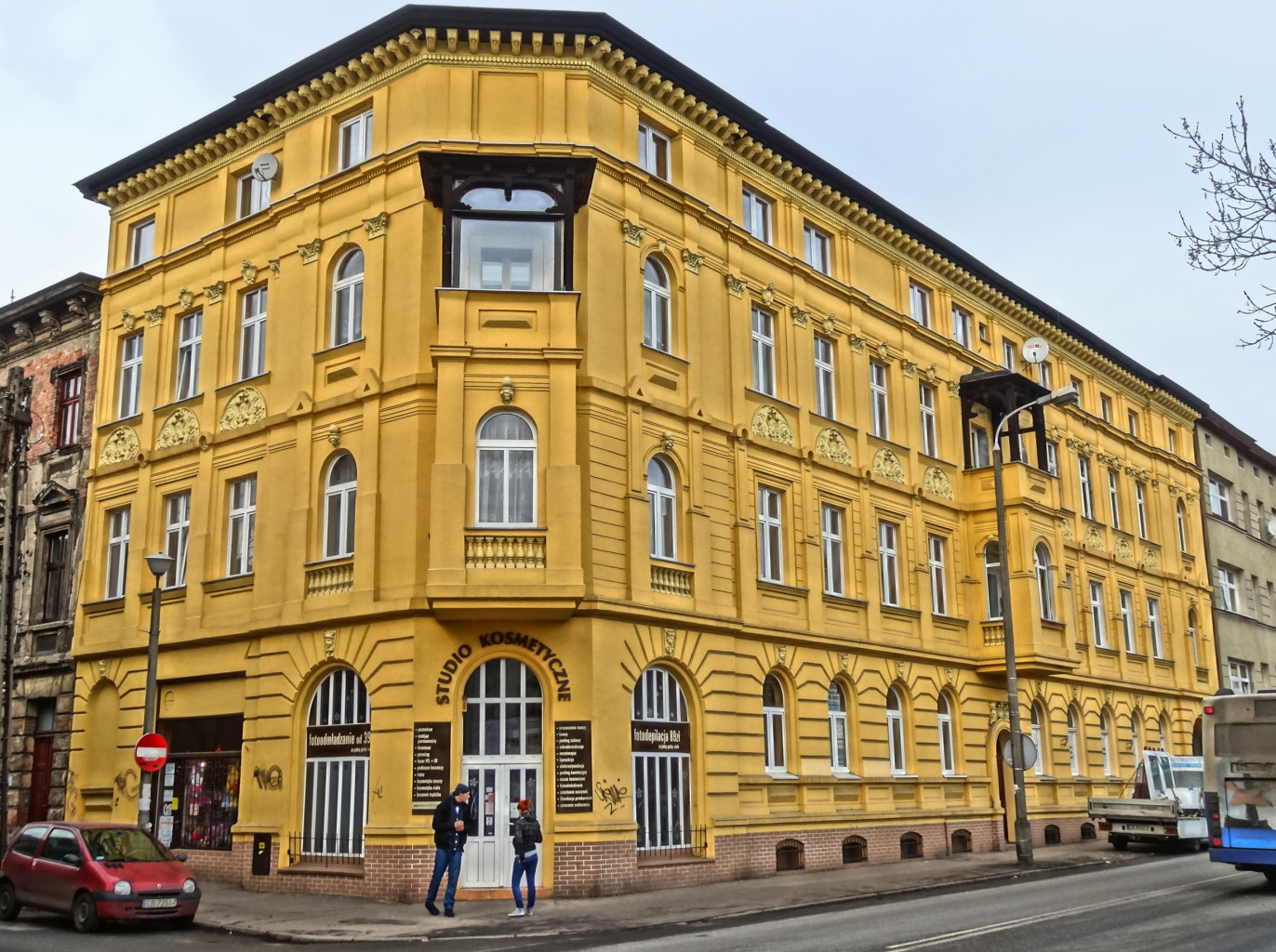
Main facade

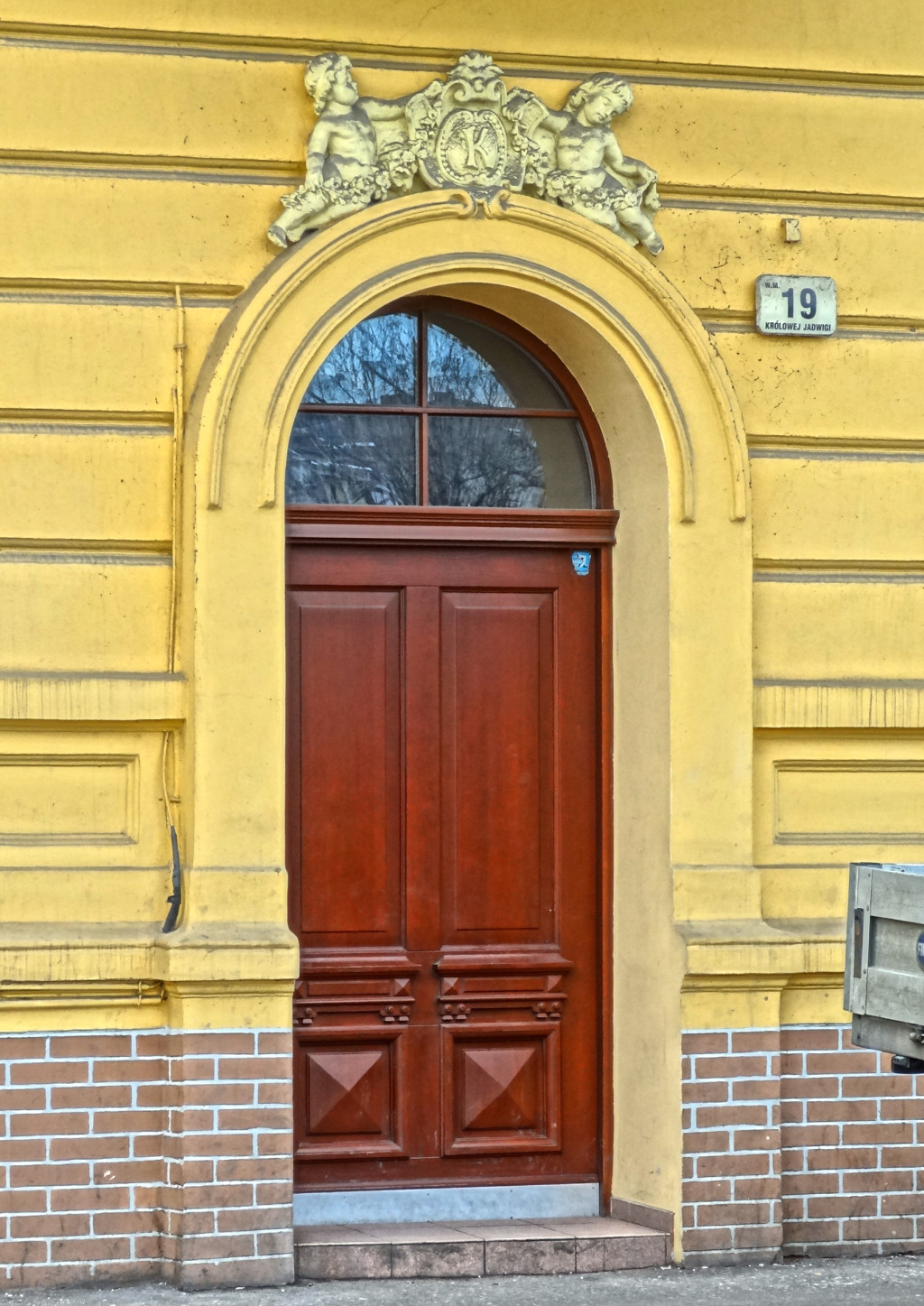
Street entrance with K initial of the first landlord

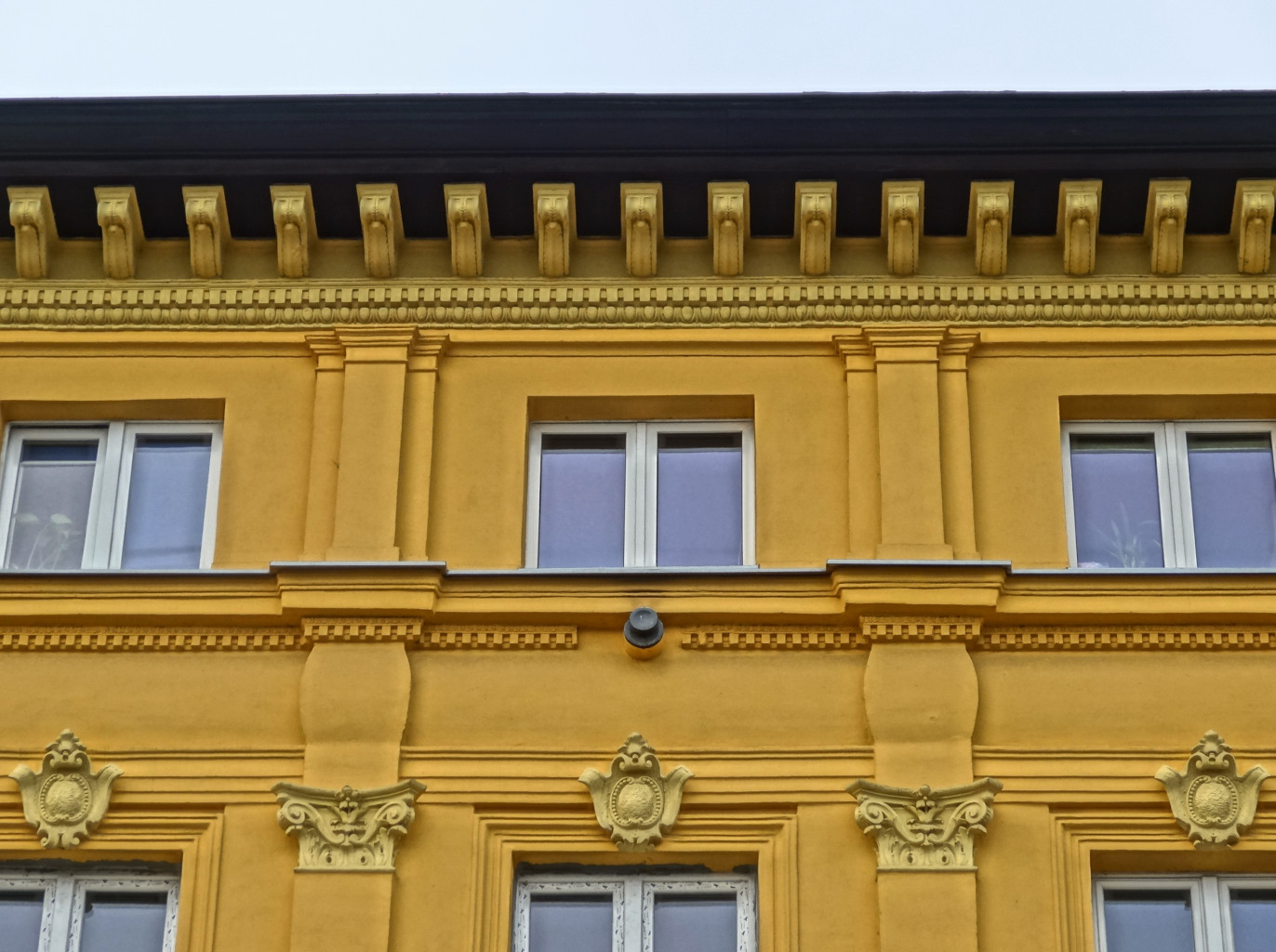
Elevation top, with adorned cornice

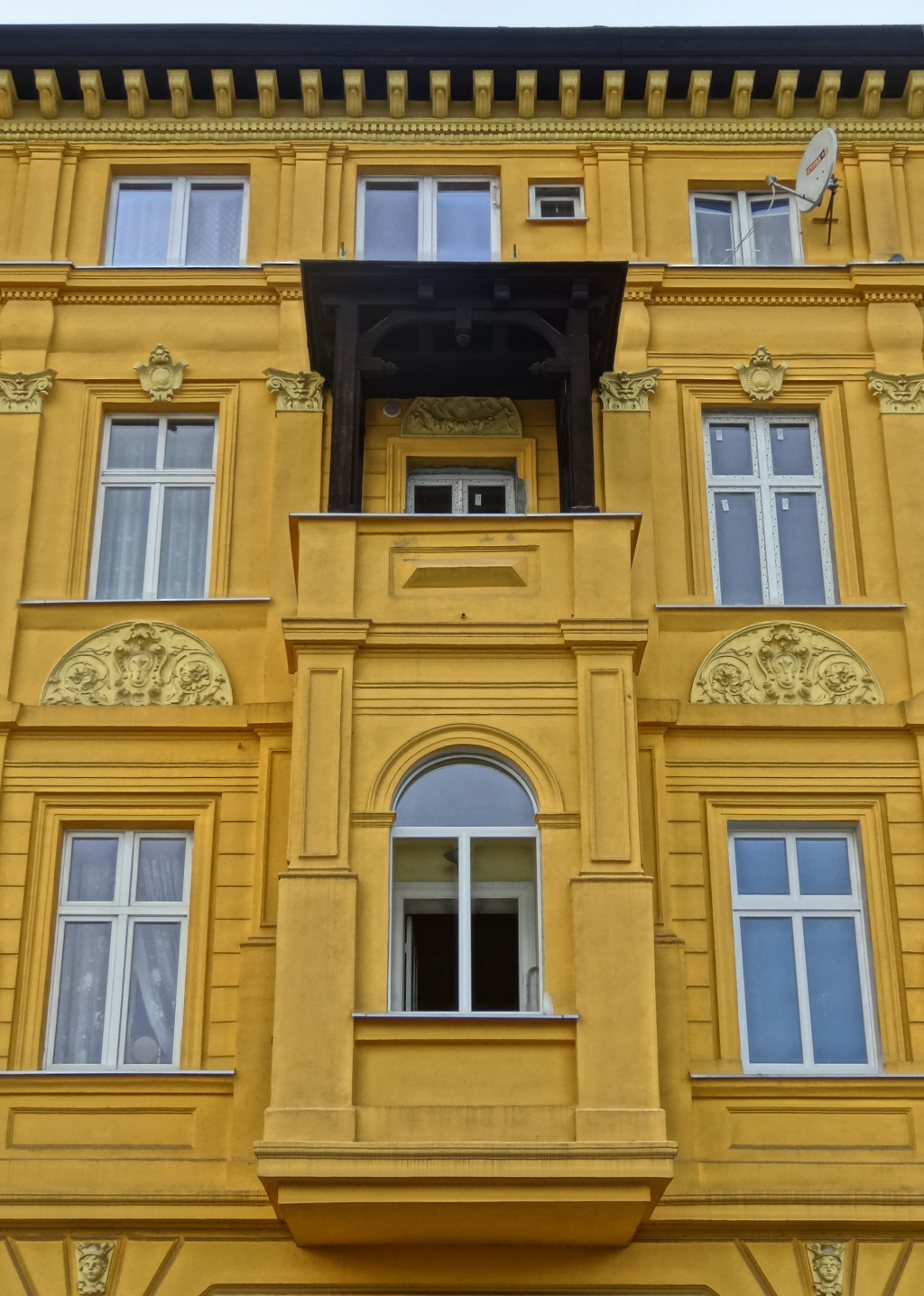
Bay window

Tenement at 2

1891-1892

Eclecticism

Carl Kaminski, the rentier who owned 2 tenements at 19 and 21 Królowej Jadwigi street, also possessed this building in 1891.

Thanks to a 2017 renovation, the facade architectural details have been highlighted: cartouches, windows pediments, bossaged ridges and corbel table.

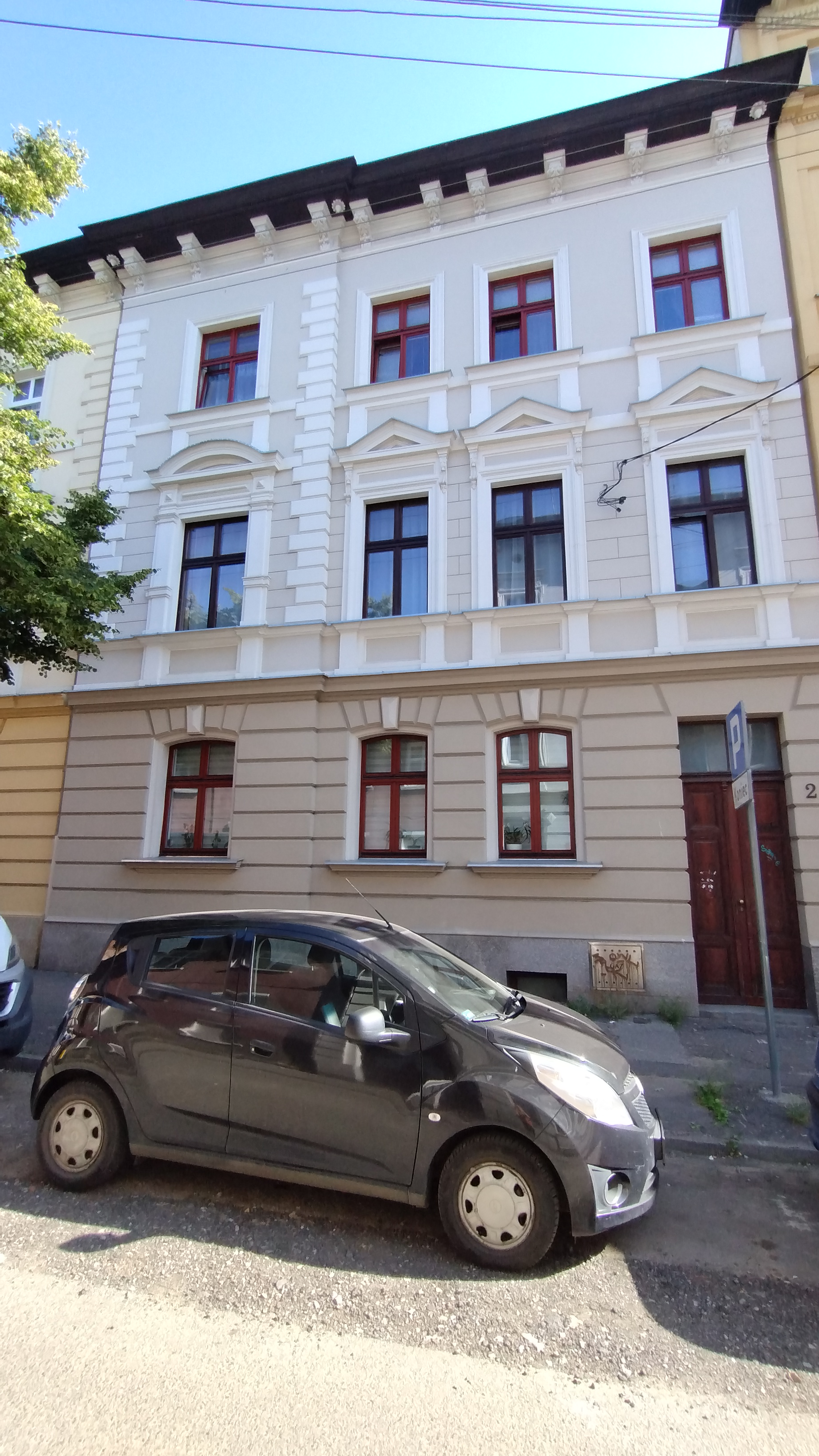
Frontage on the street

Building at 3

1890

Hermann König, a conductor, is registered as the first landlord of the house in 1890. At the time, it was registered at 2 Prinzenstrasse.

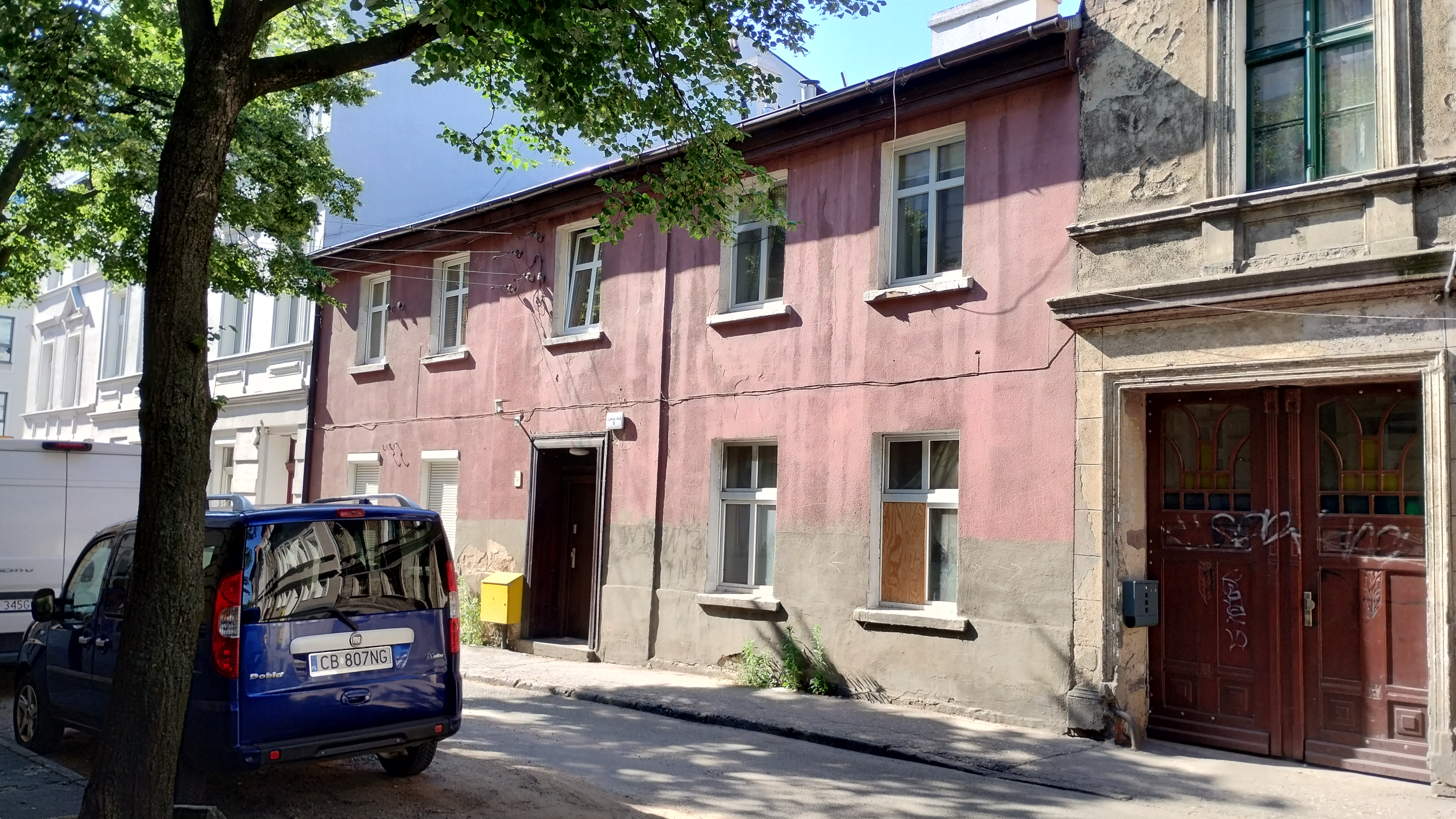
View from the street

Tenement at 4

Early 1870s

Eclecticism

Recorded at then 29 Prinzenstrasse, Albert Weise, owning a factory, was its first landlord. The tenement left the Weise family after WWI.

Renovated in 2016, the frontage composes an architectural continuity with the neighbouring facade at Nr 2. One can additionally notice the large wooden entrance door with a transom light.

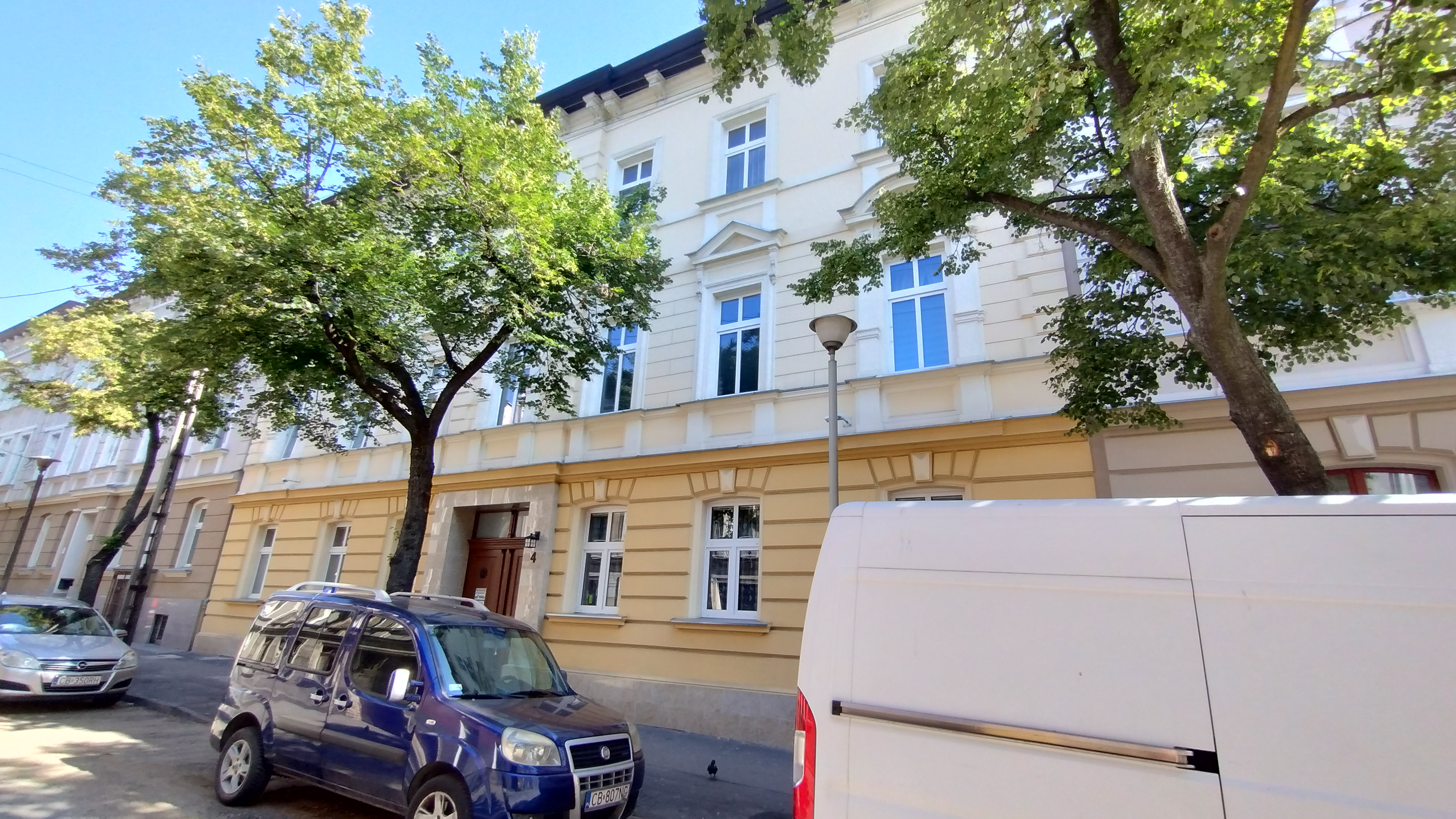
Main facade

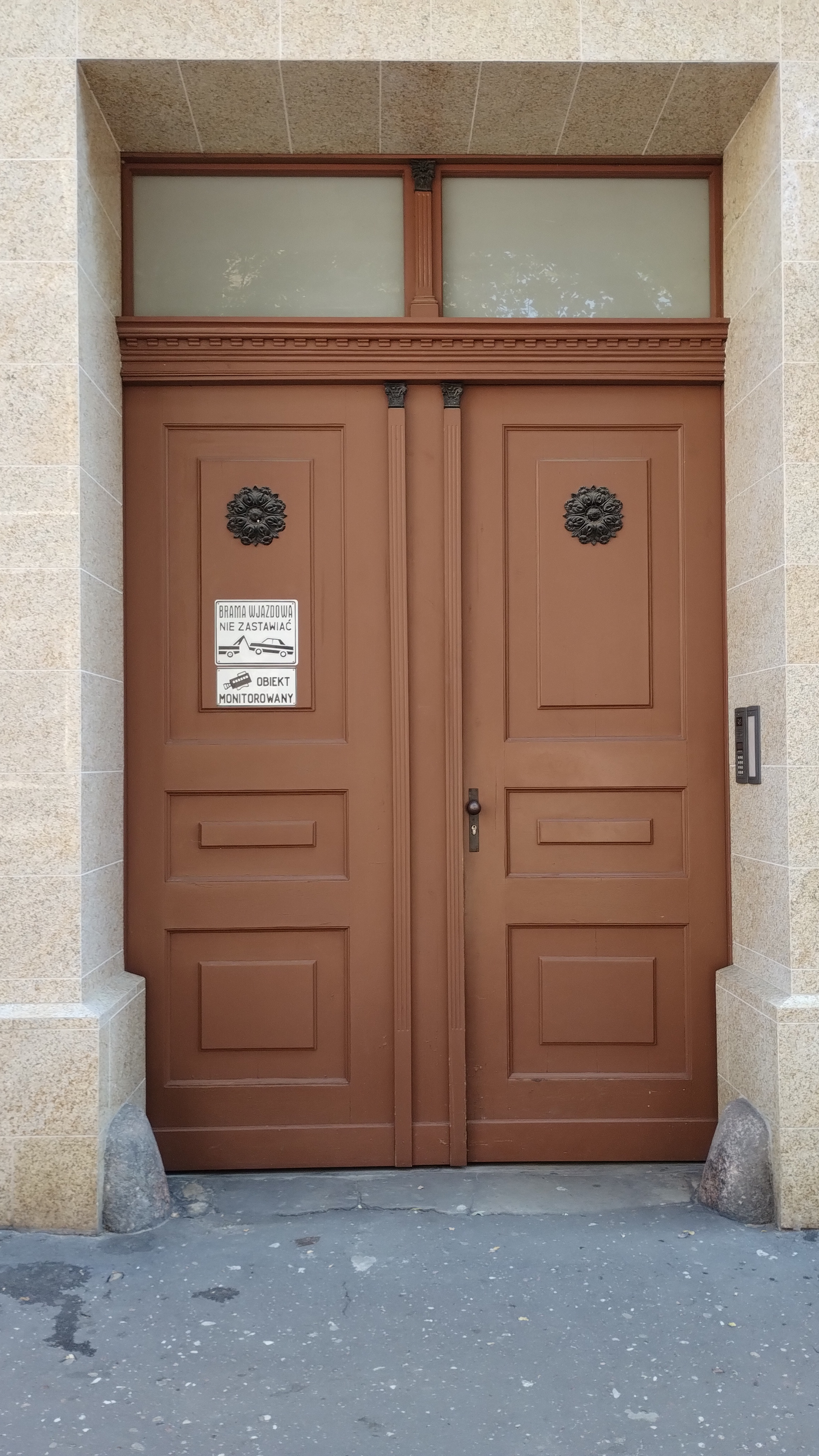
Entrance door

Tenement at 5

1899-1900

Eclecticism

Hermann König had this building (at then 2a Prinzenstrasse) erected a decade after the abutting one he owned at Nr.3 (then 2 Prinzenstrasse).

The frontage displays eclectic, though faded, details. One can notice the Art Nouveau features of the main entrance gate.

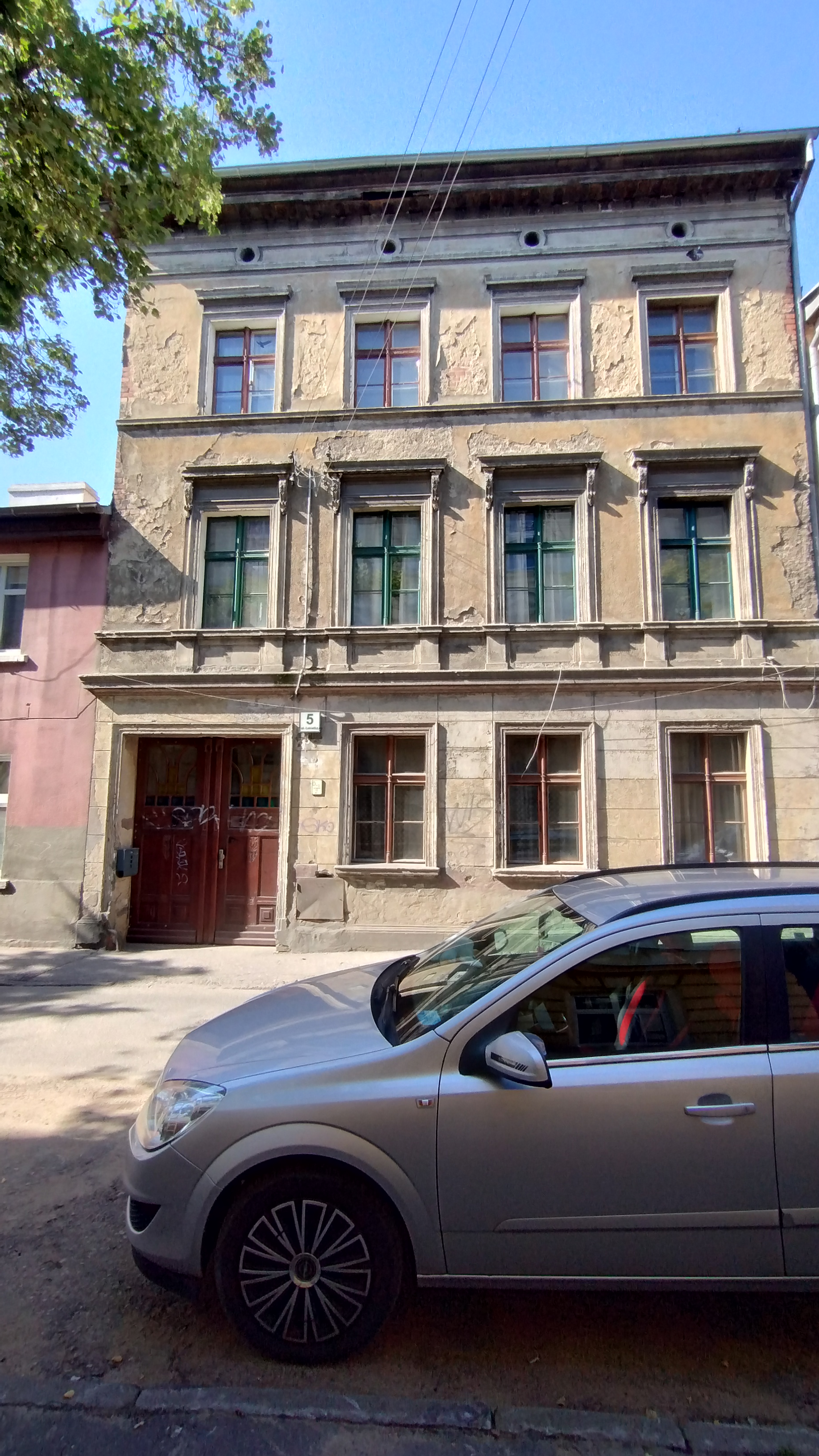
Main facade from the street

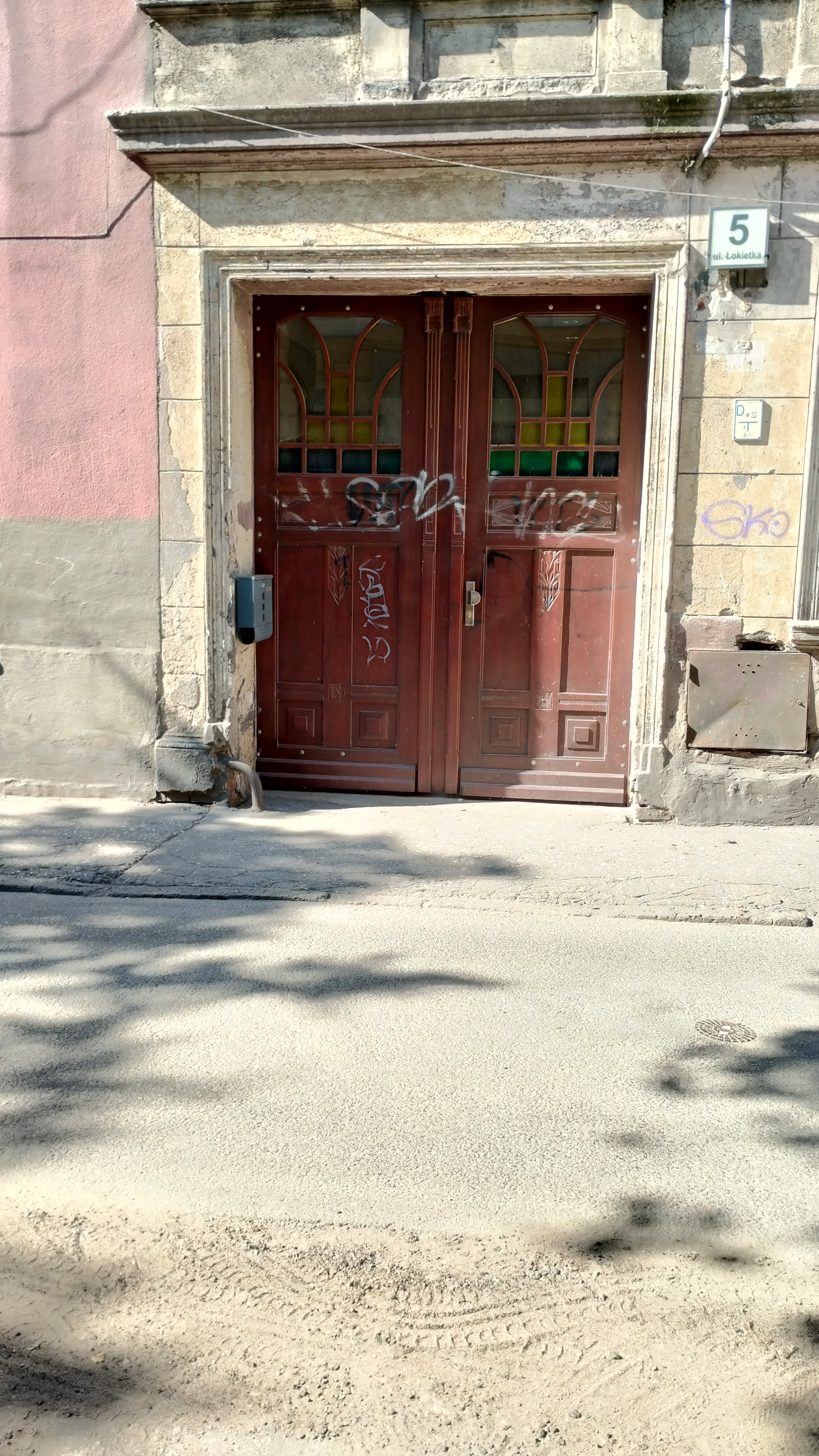
Art Nouveau entrance door

Tenement at 6/8

1891

Eclecticism

This building was also commissioned by Carl Kaminski, multi owner in the area (Nr 2, 19 Królowej Jadwigi Street and 3 Posernerplatz-non existent). Kaminski was a dealer of coal and wood.

The renovated frontage (2016) boasts eclectic architectural features along its length.

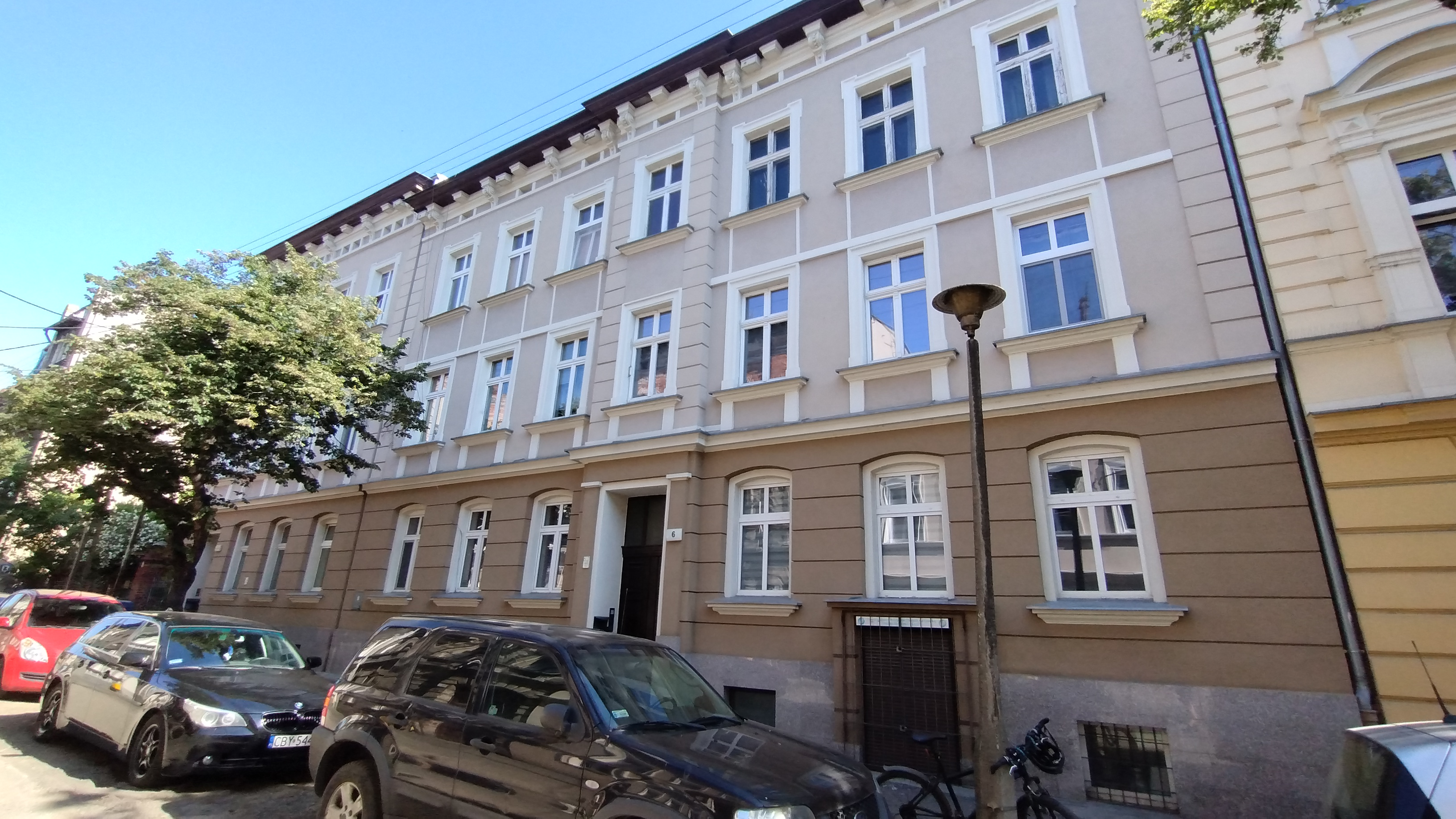
View of 6 and 8 fronatages

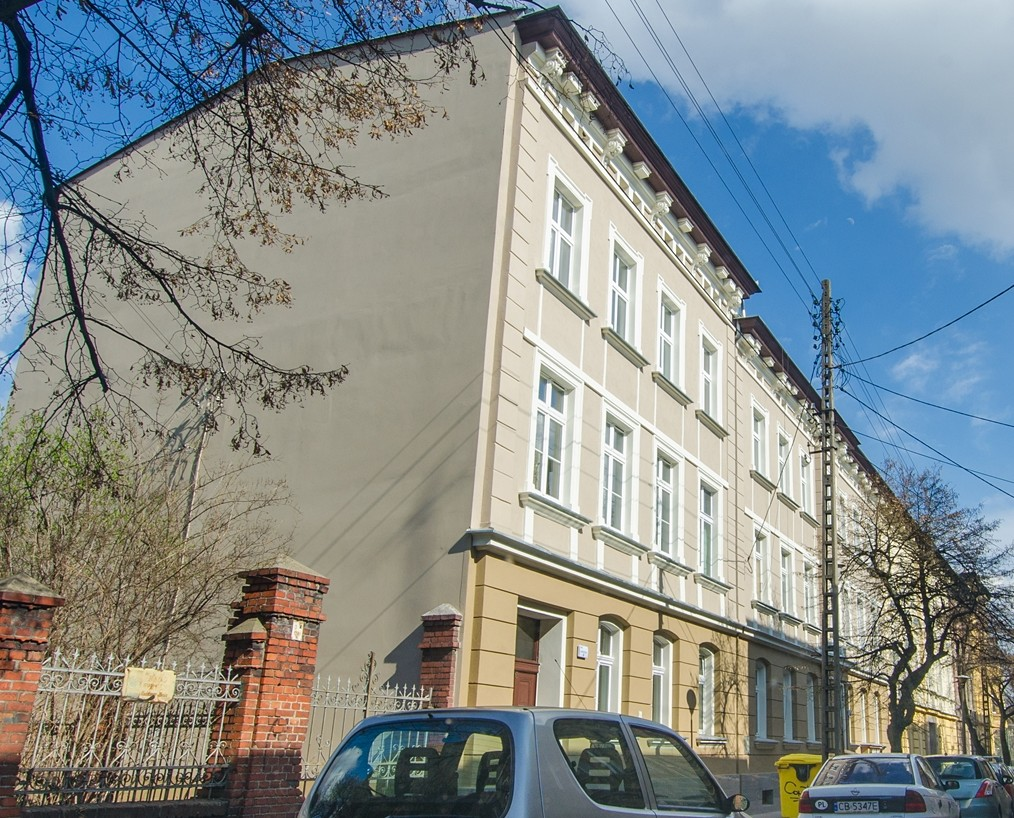
View of Nr 8

Tenement at 7

1876

Eclecticism

The building was registered at 3 Prinzenstrasse, its first owner was Mr. Kanneberg.

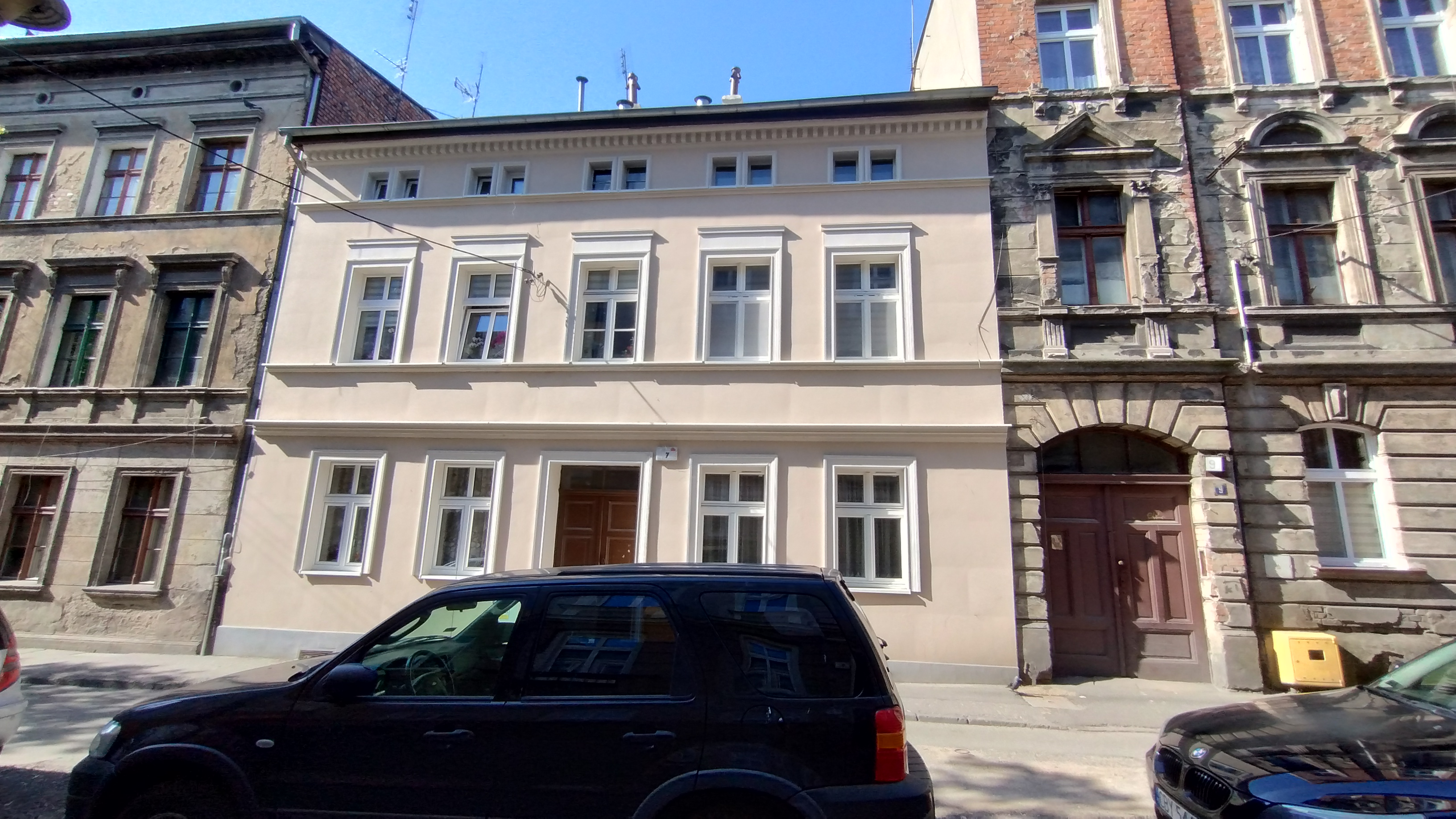
Facade onto the street

Tenement at 9

1891-1892

Eclecticism

The first landlord of the edifice was August Böhnert, a master blacksmith.

The exterior, in need of refurbishing, exhibits anyhow bossage elements, decorated windows brackets and pediments as well as other plastered details (corbel table).

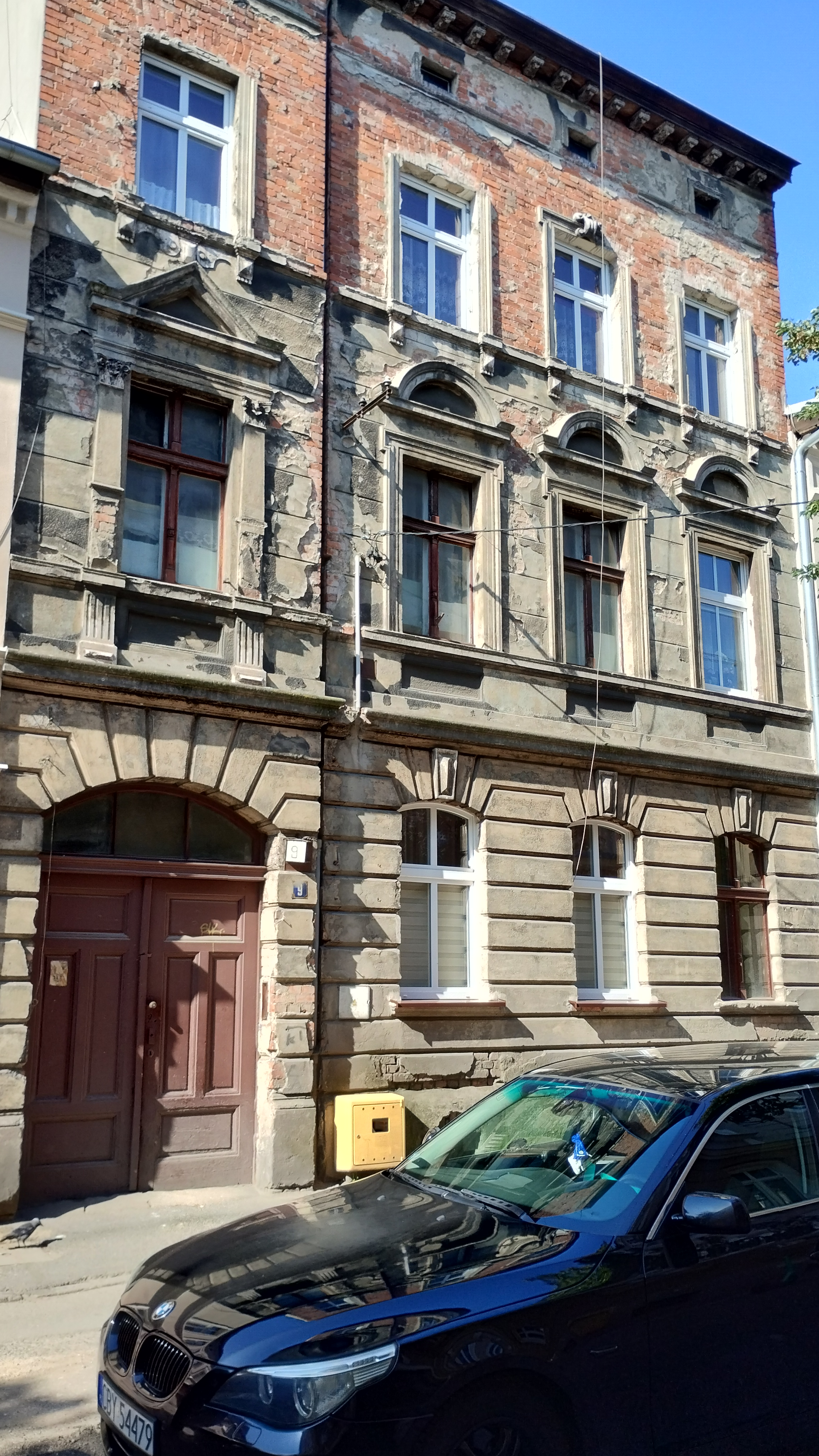
Main frontage

House at 10

1875-1900

First owner of the house, at then 27 Prinzenstrasse, was Mr. Bielert. From 1901 to the outbreak of WWII, the place was owned by the Evangelical Church Community (Evangelische Kirchengemeinde, Ewang. Gmina Kościelna).

The original railing still displays an old advertising for Waldemar Klein's tailor shop (Zakład krawiecki).

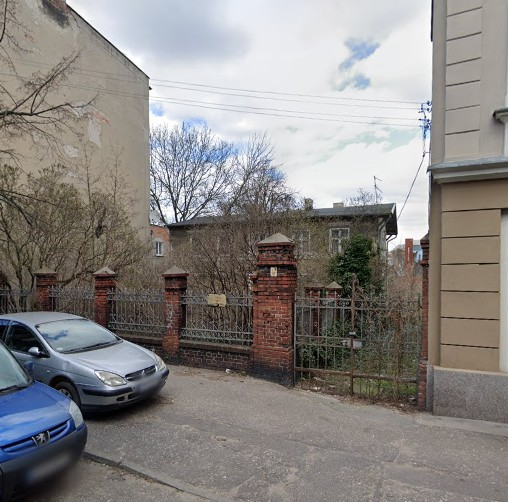
View from the street

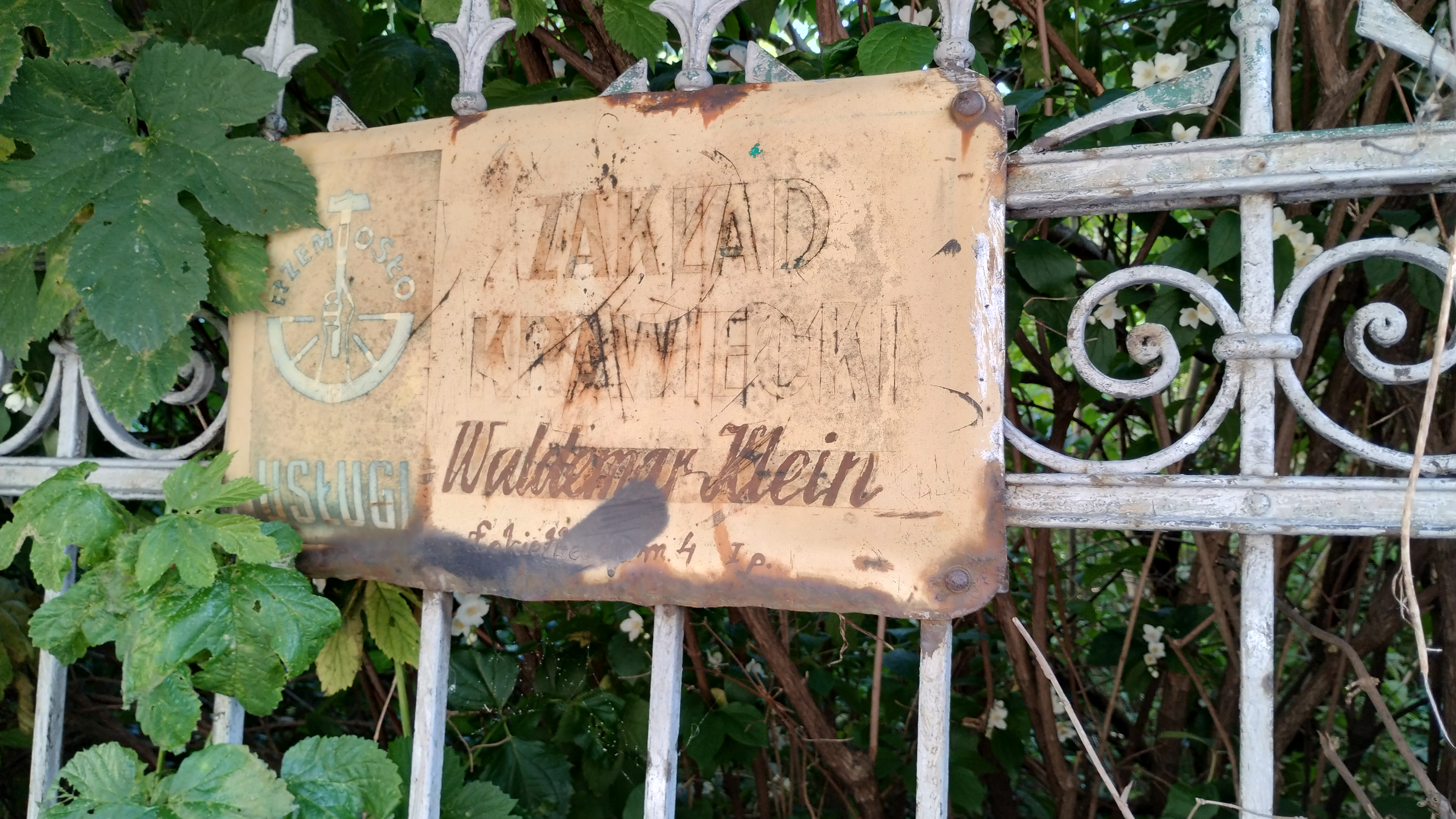
Waldemar Klein's tailor shop

Krause's tenement at 11

1879

Eclecticism

The Krause family has owned the tenement from its inception till the Second world war.

The building has been renovated in 2024 by the city services. It consists of two storeys, an attic and a partial basement. Despite its small dimensions, the front of the building is richly decorated with, among others, bossage bands, adorned window sills, pediments and cornices.

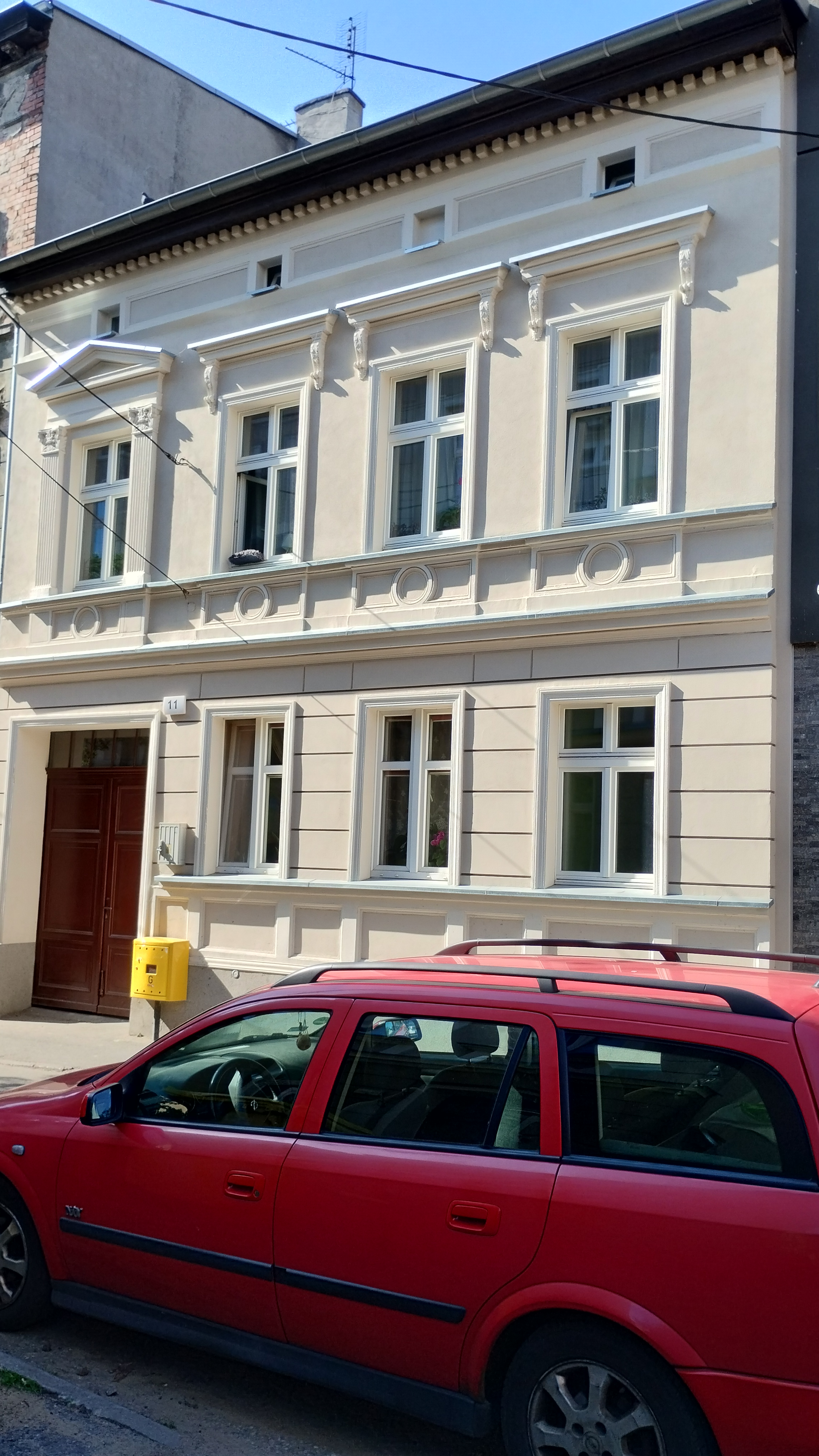
Main frontage

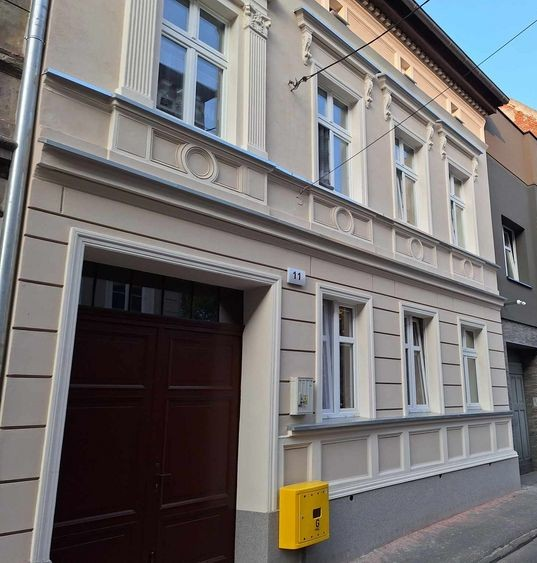
Facade details

Tenement at 12

1911-1912

Late Art Nouveau

The first landlord of this tenement was Auguste Lemke, a locomotive driver.

The facade onto the street lost most of its features: one can make out pilasters on both side of the frontage as well as a frieze with vegetal motifs running above the left upper windows.

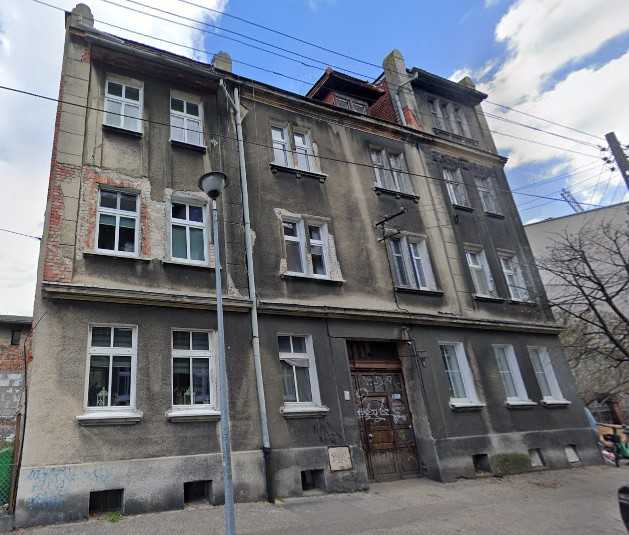
Main frontage

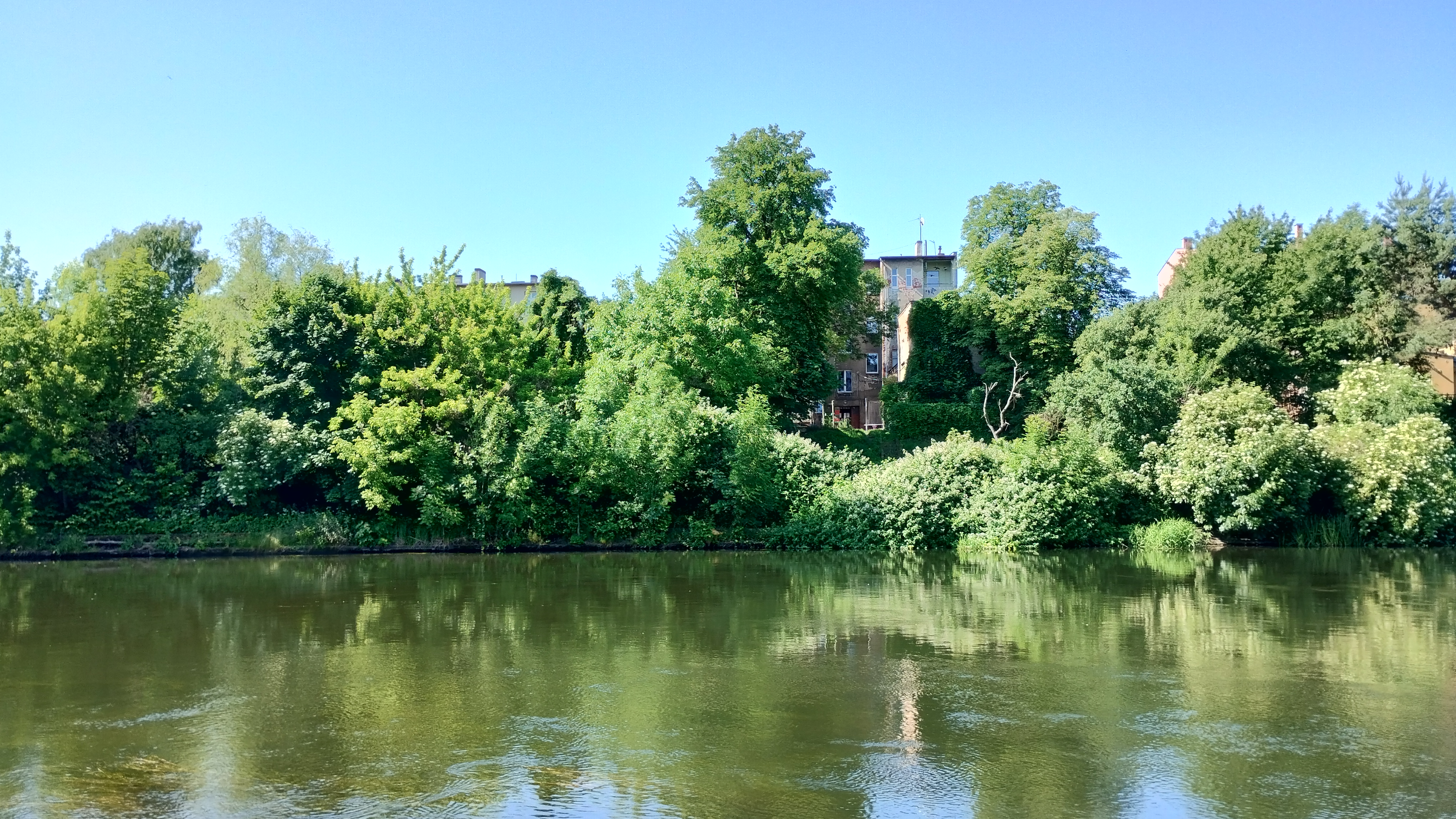
View of the tenement from the Brda river

Tenement at 15

1912-1913

Late Art Nouveau

Catharina Bucholz, a widow, was registered as owner of this tenement at then 5 Prinzenstrasse. Catharina Bucholz was related to Ludwig Buchholz, an entrepreneur who established a successful tannery in Garbary Street in 1845.

The edifice presents the longest facade of all the original buildings in the street. The facade still exhibits many plastered details: floral decoration above the entrance and festoons under the windows. The right and left wings have balconies and loggias with balustrades.

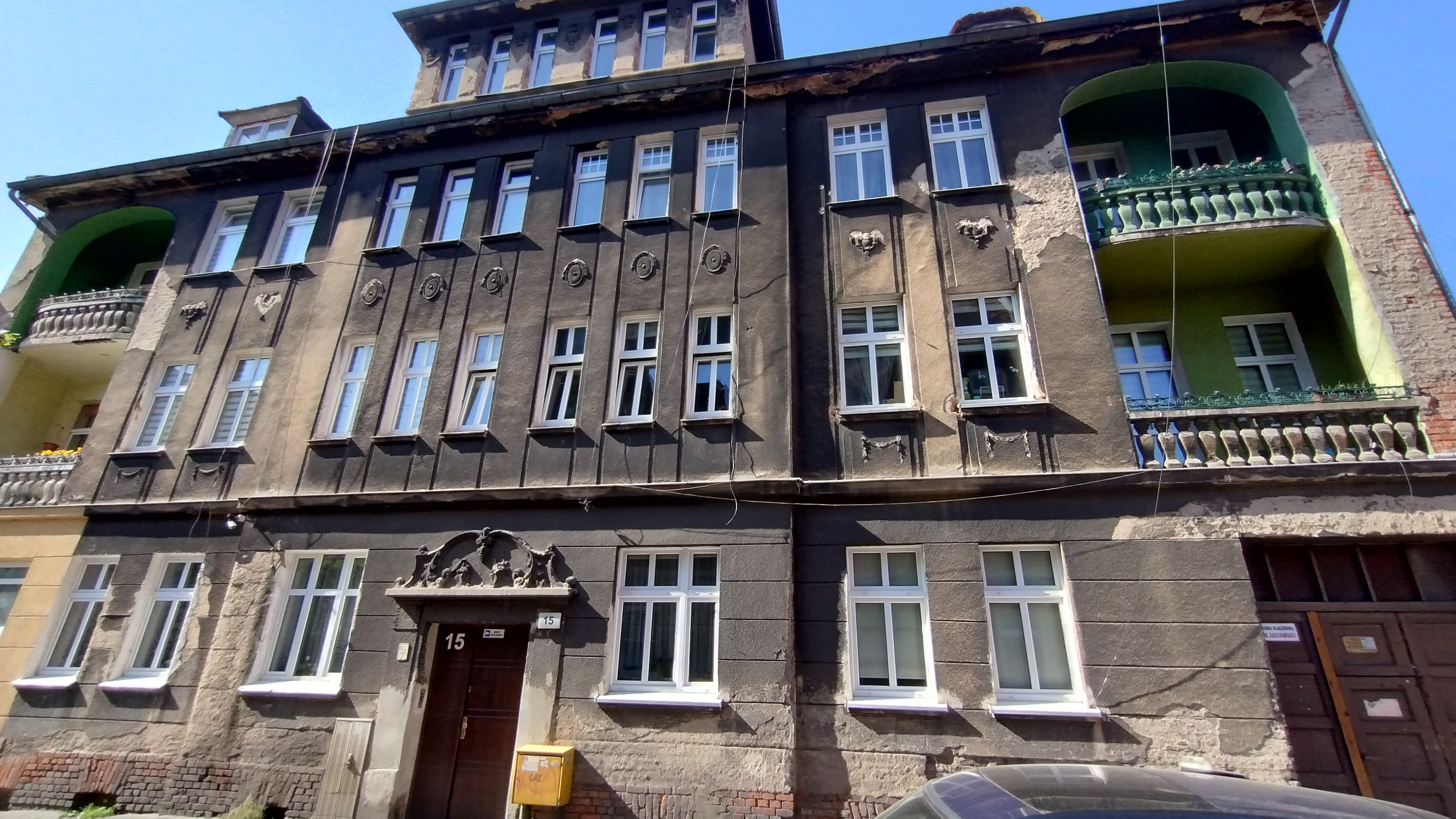
View of the frontage

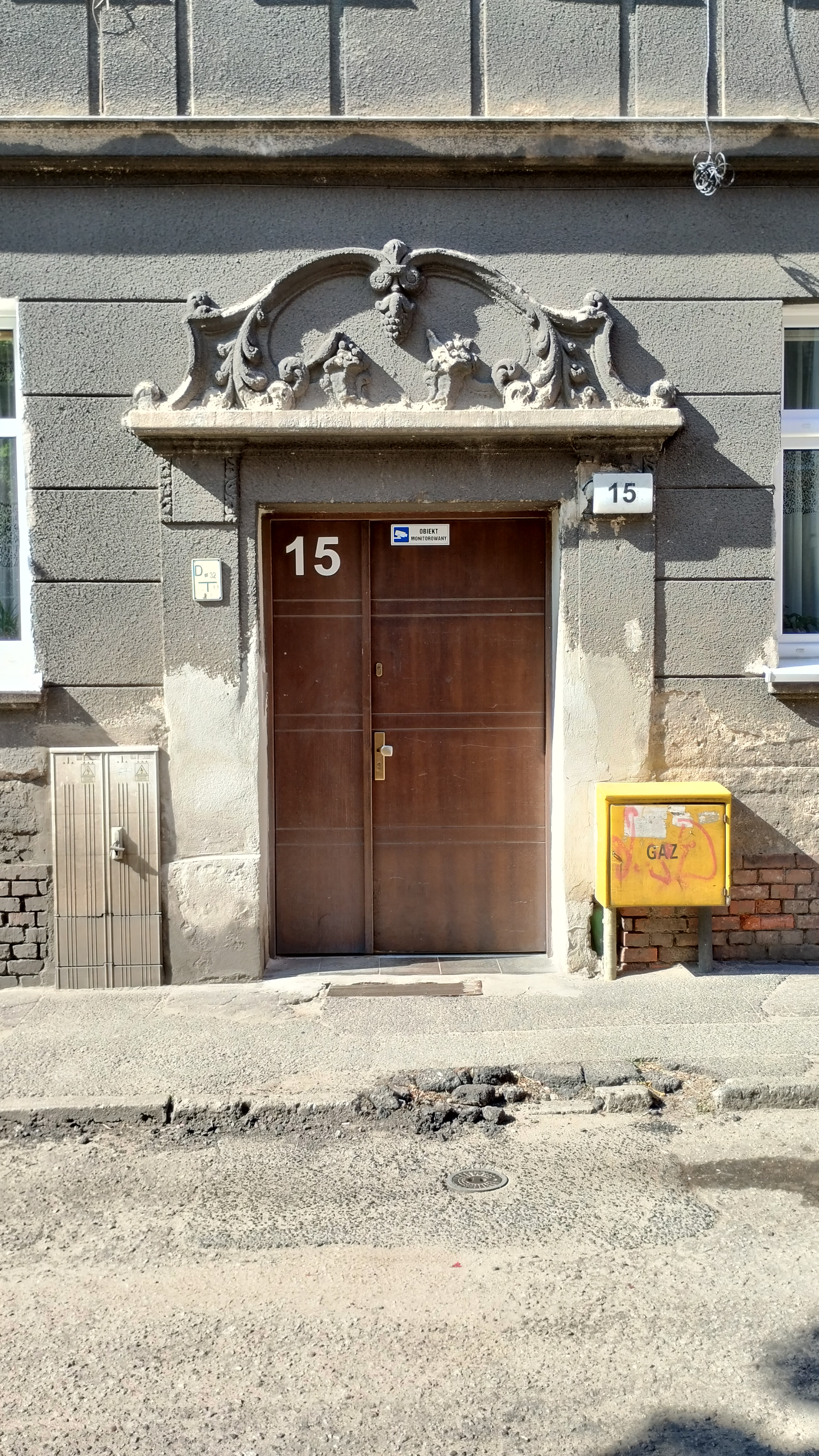
Detail of the adorned entrance portal

Tenement at 16

1896-1897

Eclecticism

A widow, Ernestine Brodowski was the first owner of this tenement.

The building has been refurbished in 2017/2018 and presents an eclectic style.

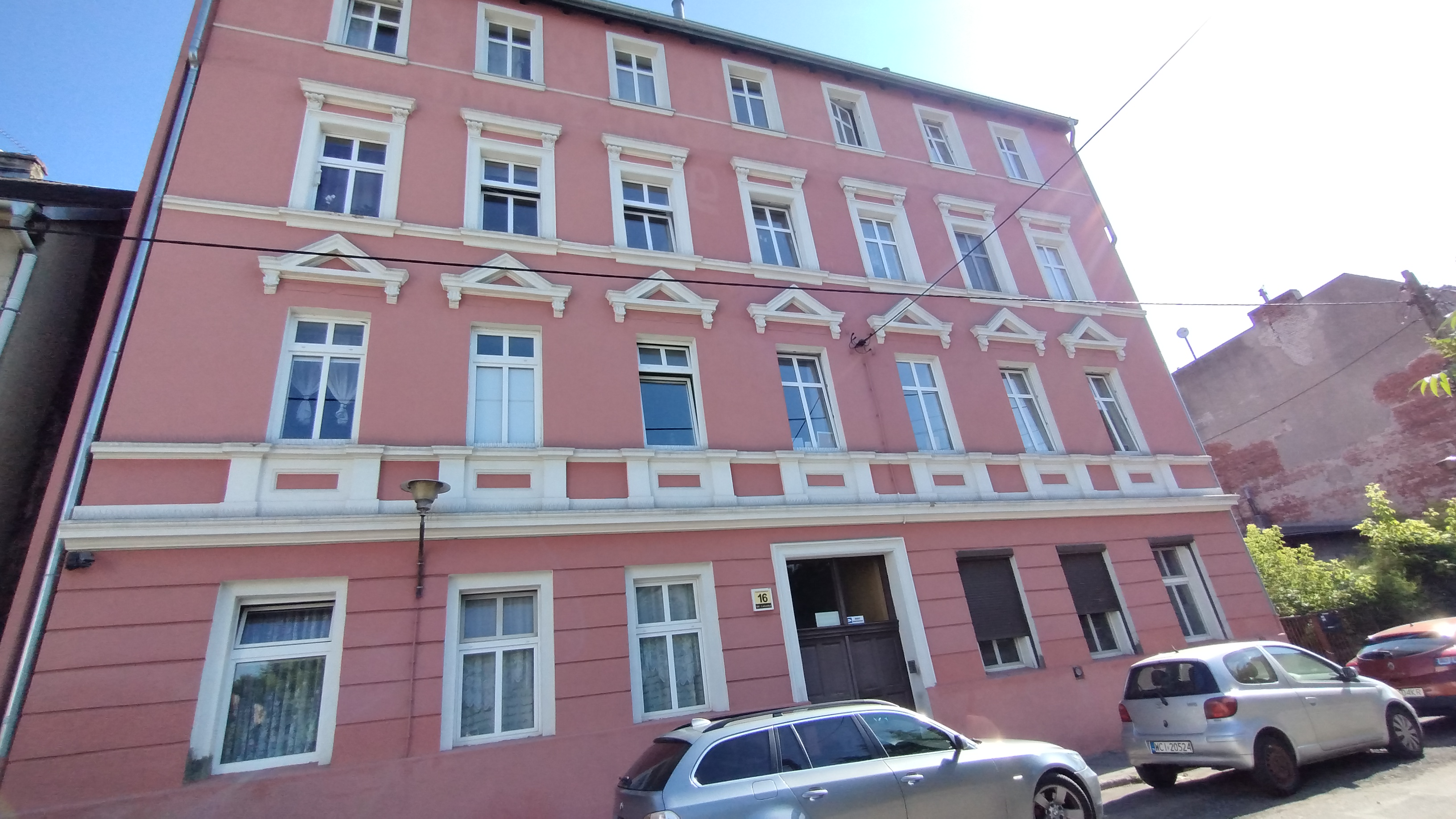
View from the street

Building at 18

Late 1860s

The edifice was registered at then 24 Prinzenstrasse, with Philipp Eberle, a butcher, as its landlord. From 1880 to 1905, the building had been owned by the Buchholz family.

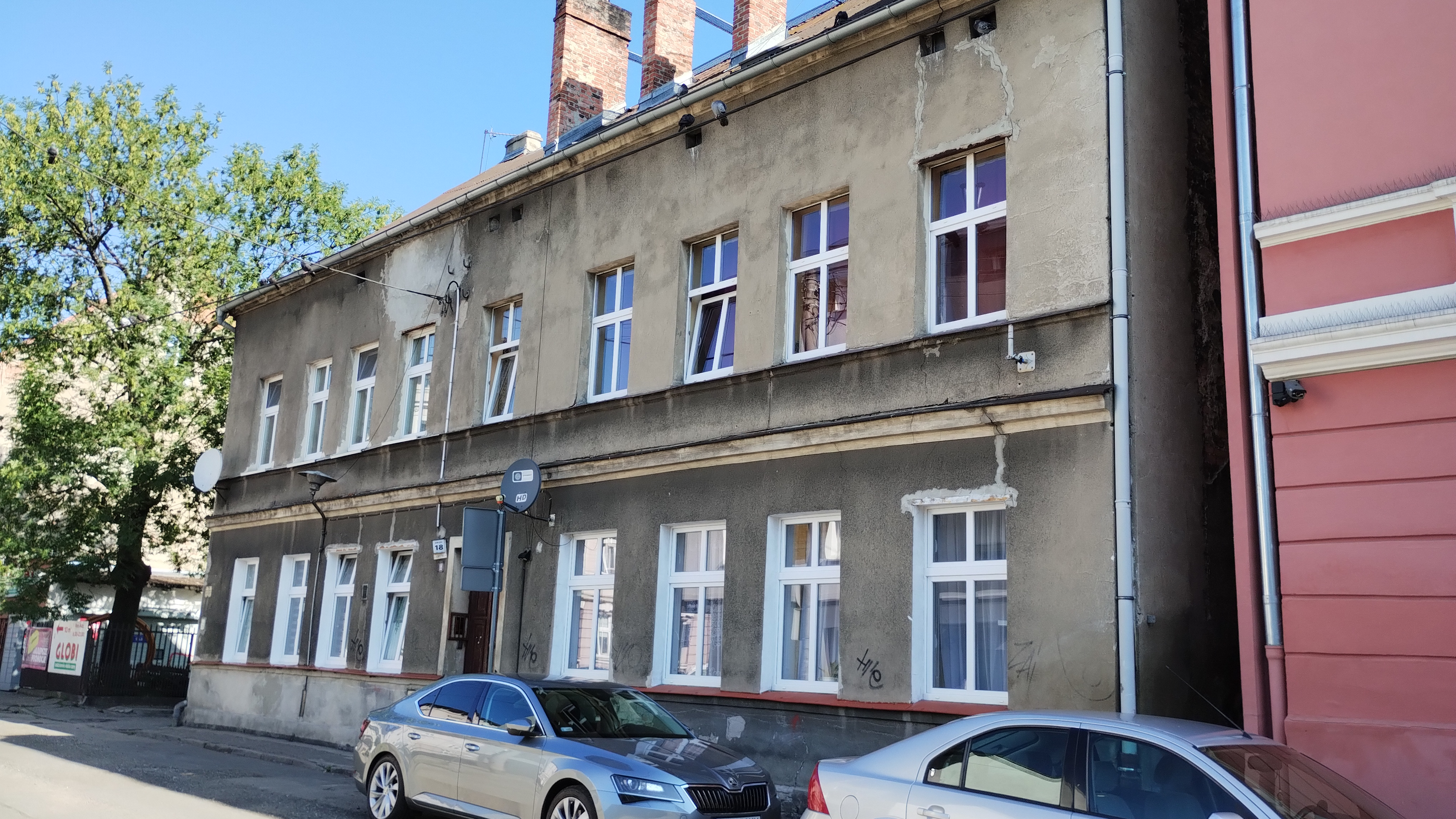
Facade onto the street

Tenement at 19A, corner with Jackowskiego street

Mid-1930s

Modernism

The tenement has been renovated in 2020.

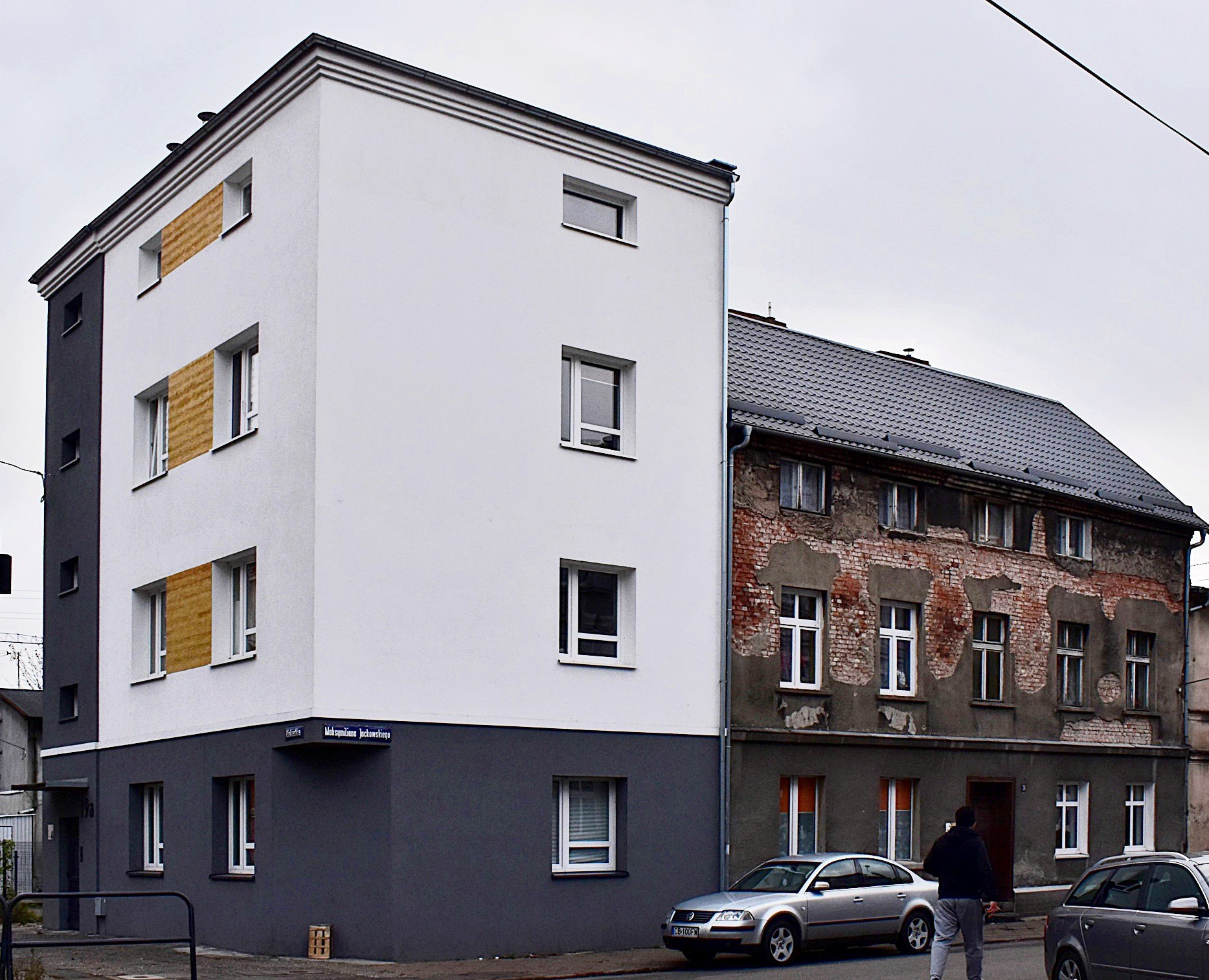
View from the street corner

Tenement at 21, corner with 29 Maksymiliana Jackowskiego street

1897

Eclecticism

Its first landlord was Ludwig Shick, listed as a worker in 1897.

The building has been recently refurbished and exhibits on both of its frontages platered lintels, some arched pediments, a decorated entrance portal on Łokietka street and a corbel table running on top of the facades.

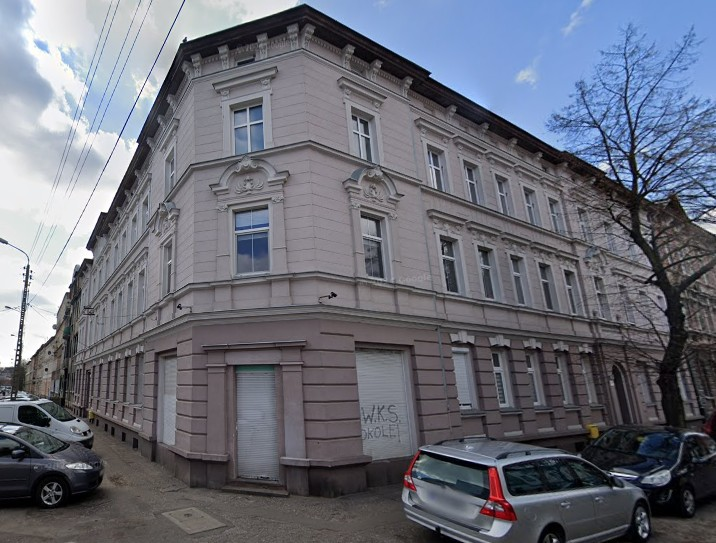
View from the street intersection

Tenement at 23/25, corner with 16 Długosza street

1897

Eclecticism

A rentier, Carl Juncker, was the first landlord of this large tenement. He lived at then 18 Schleinitz strasse, today's 20 Chrobrego street.

The building has been refurbished in June 2025.

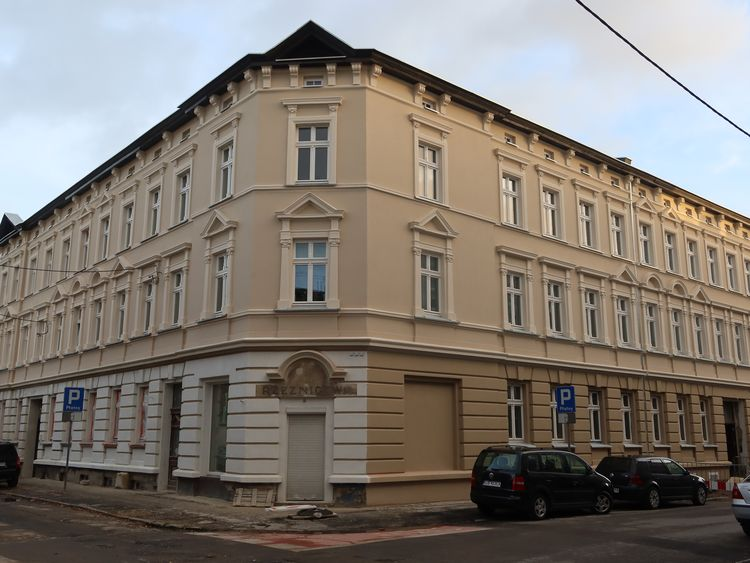
Corner view

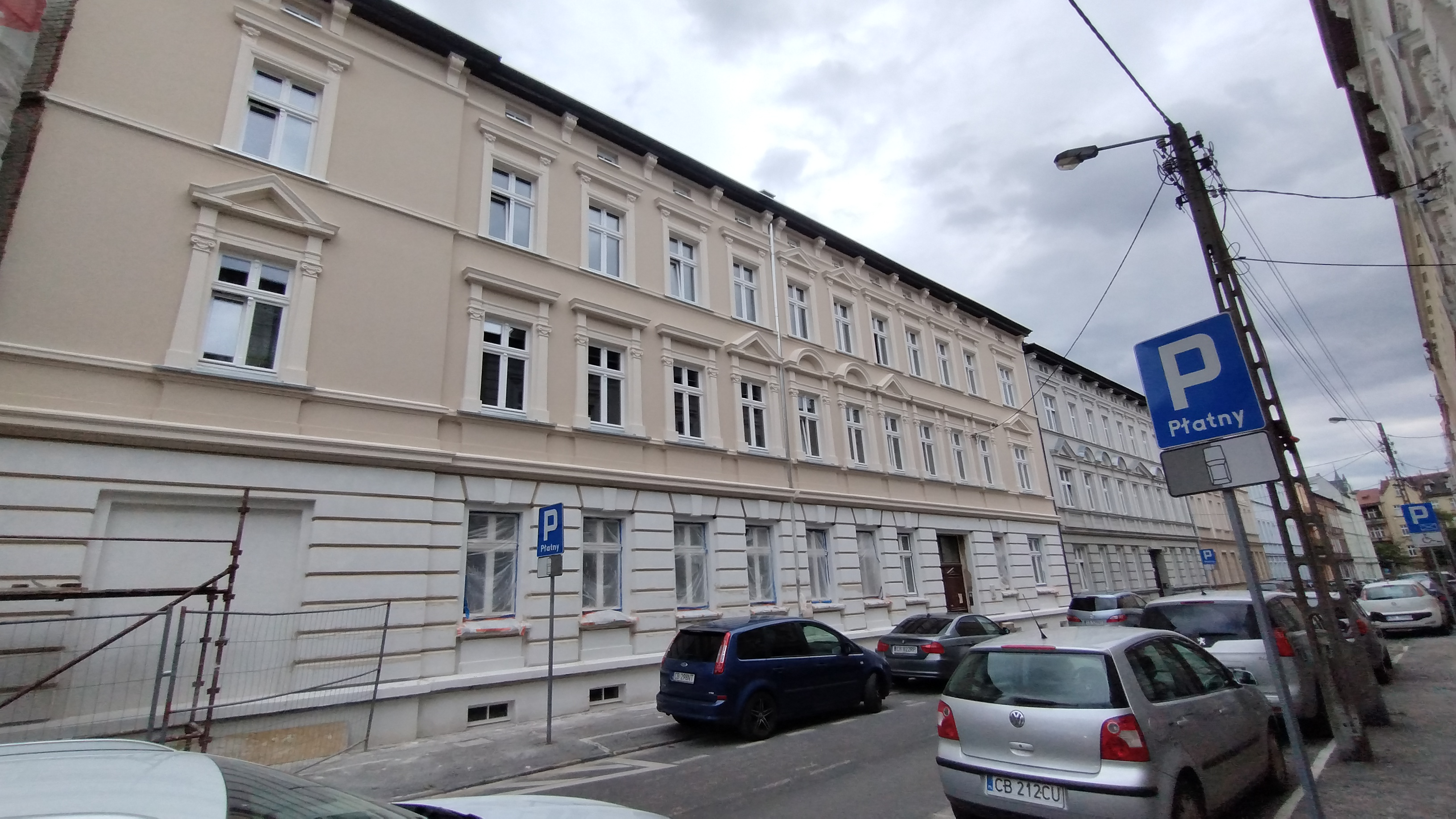
Renovated facade onto Długosza street

Tenements at 26/28

2024

Modern architecture

On this plot, K&M INVESTMENT POLAND built a residence with access to the river, Riverside Residences.

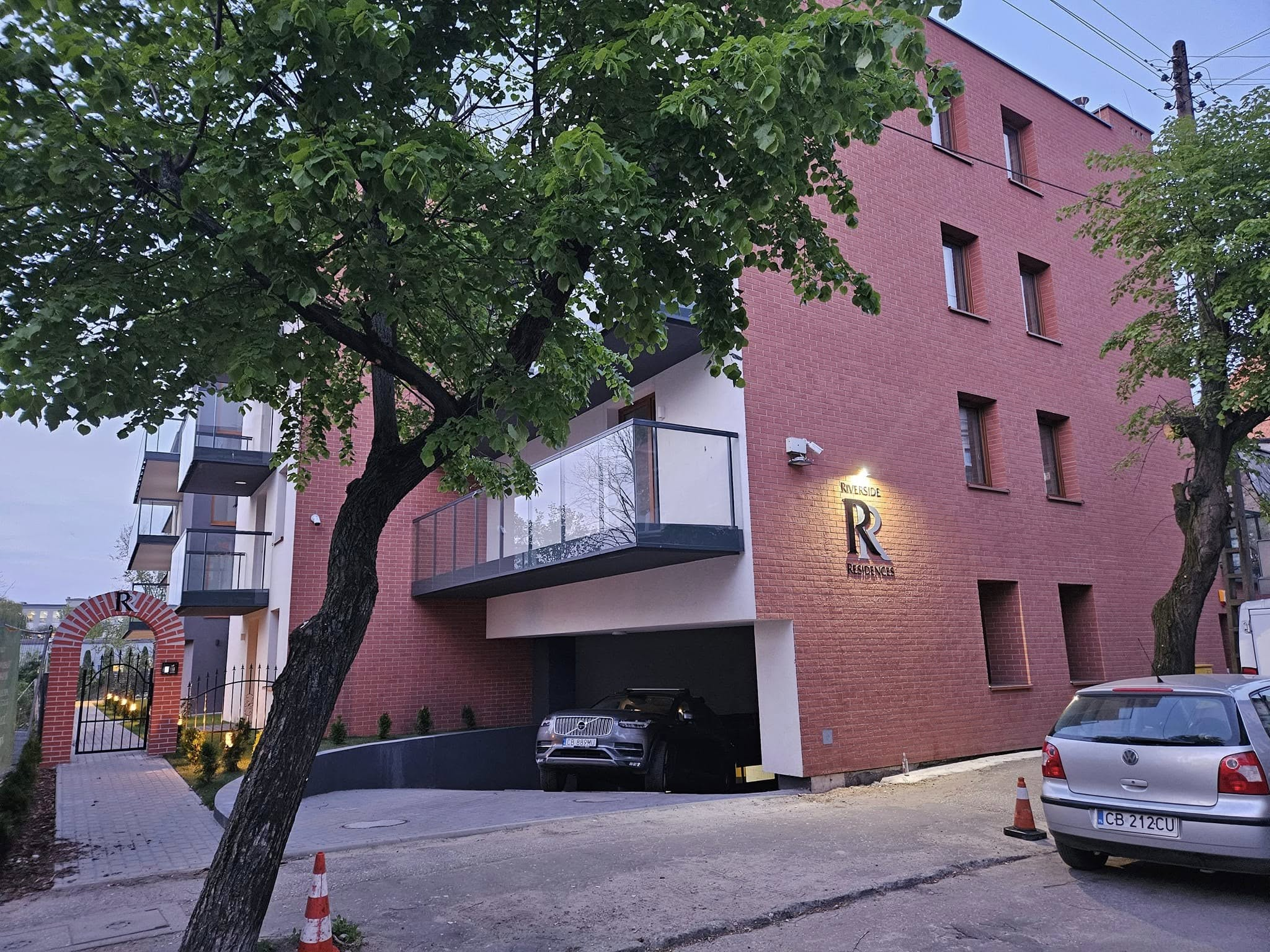
Street view

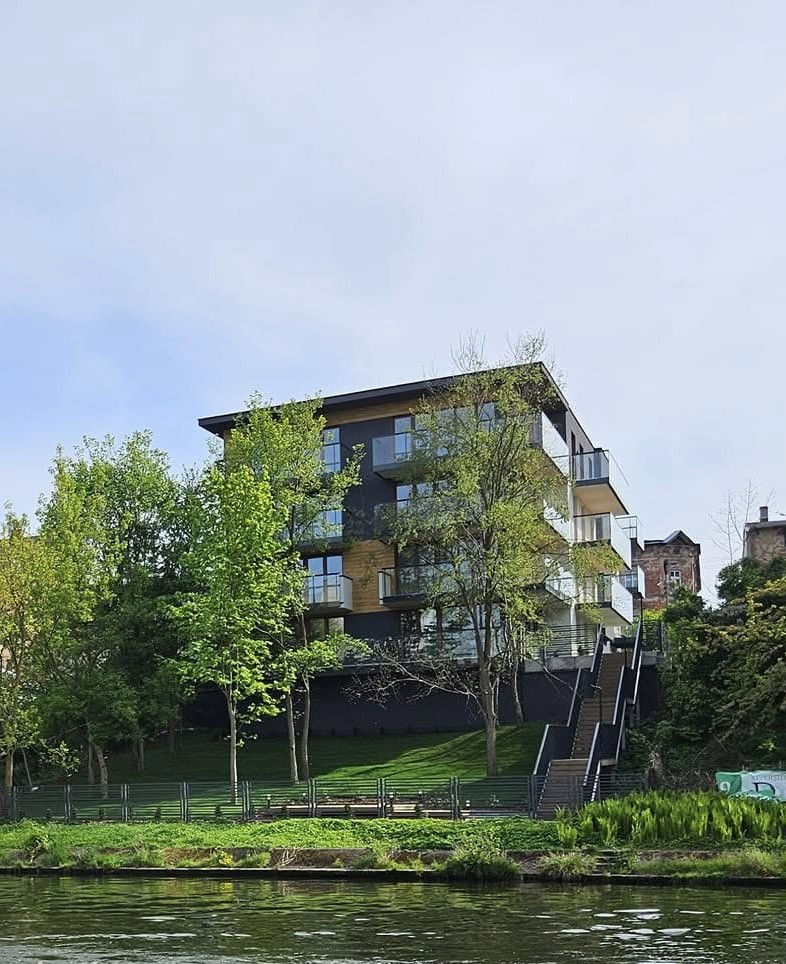
View from the river

Tenement at 27, corner with 13 Długosza street

1896

Eclecticism

The tenement, then at 8c Prinzentrasse, was first commissioned by Ignaß Borzychowski, a painter. The latter also possessed the neighbouring building at today's 29, once built in 1899. At the time, the ground floor housed a restaurant managed by Johann Ringert.

The edifice has been refurbished in 2018. It now exhibits remarkable decorative details (e.g. plastered motifs in pediments, on top corbels and lintels).

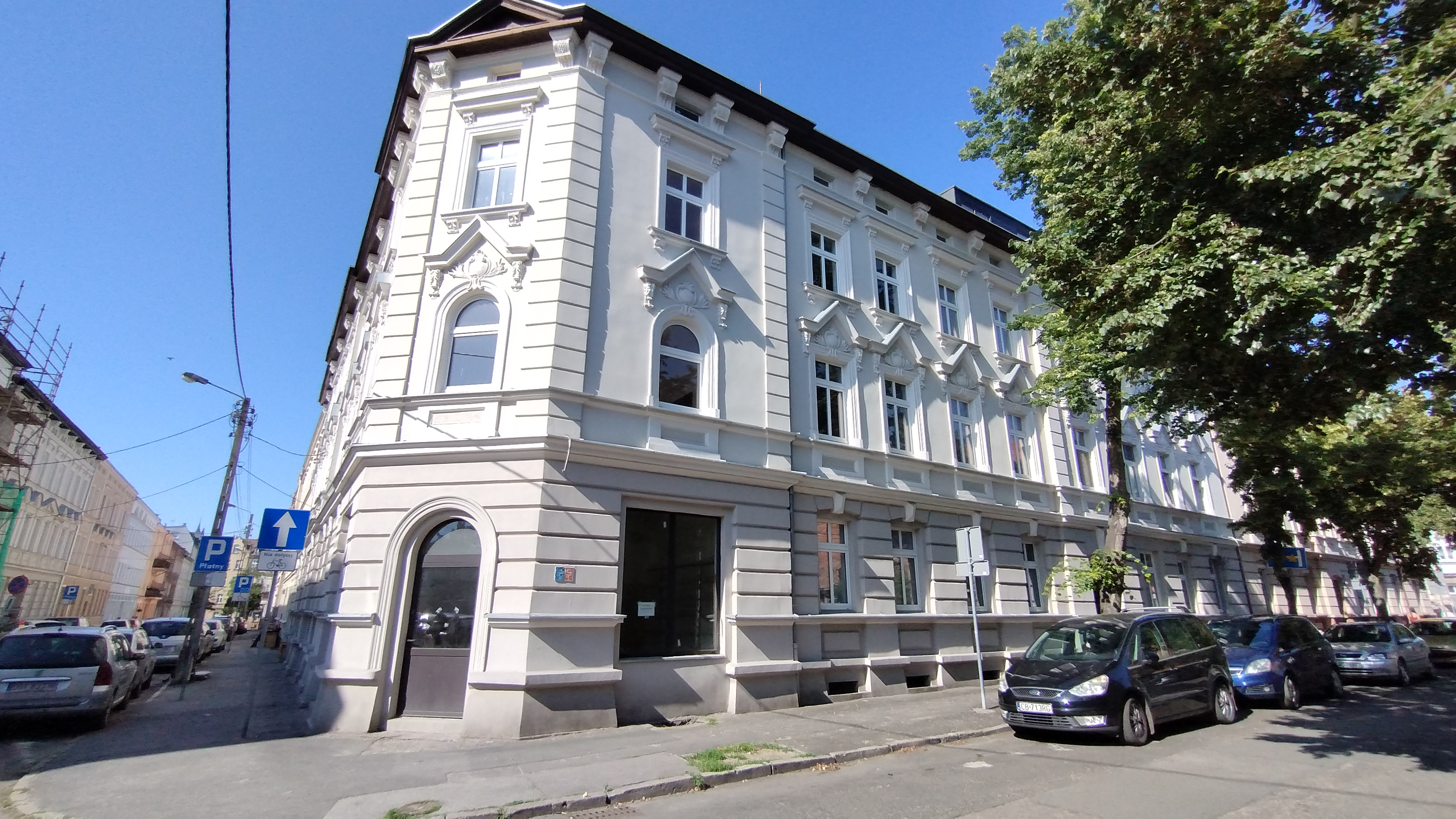
View of from the street corner

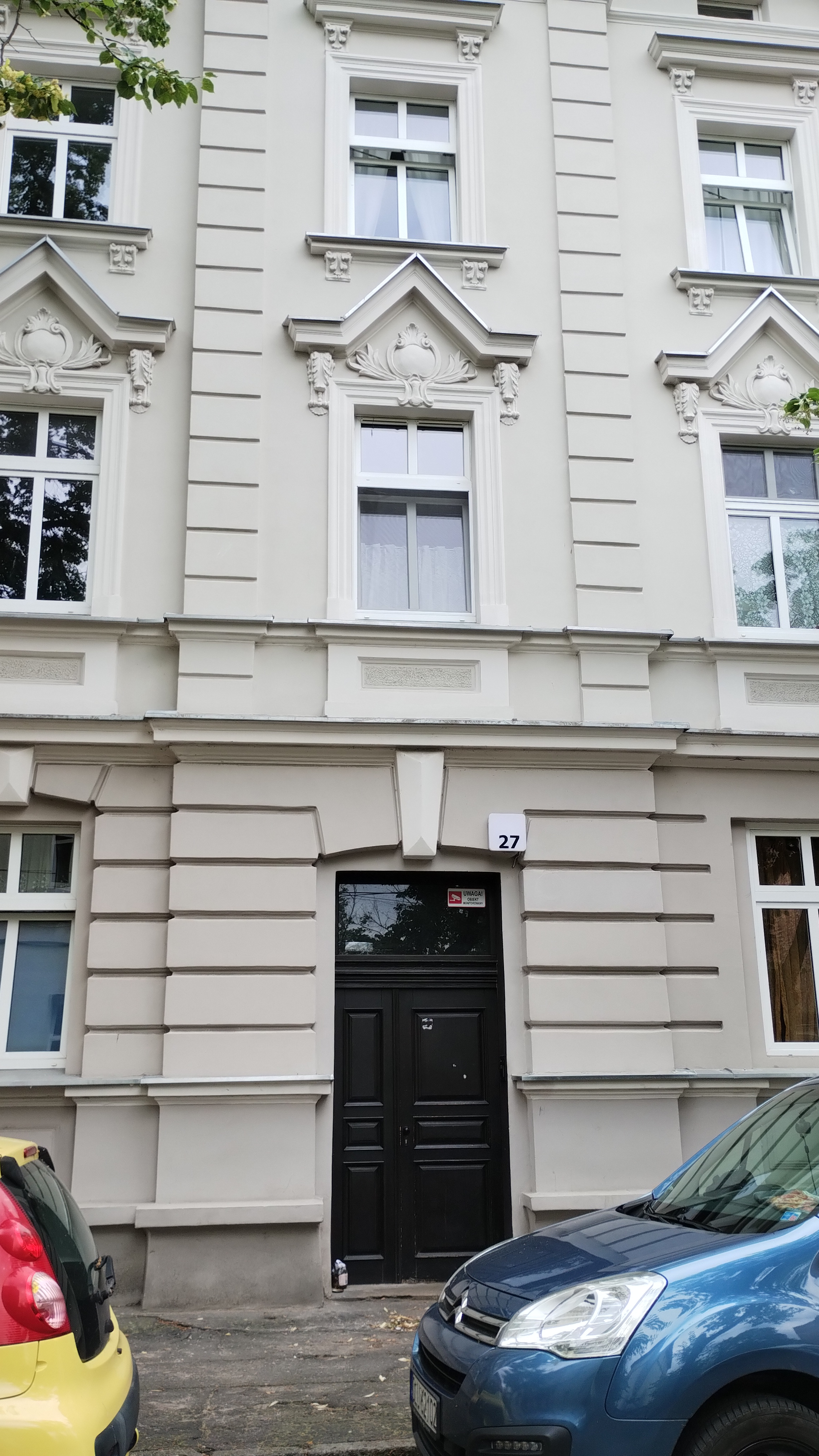
Detail of the entrance portal

Tenement at 29, corner with 12 Siemiradzkiego street

1897-1898

Eclecticism

Ignaß Borzychowski, the painter owning the tenement at then 8c, was also the commissioner of this building at then 8d Prinzen strasse.

The restoration carried out in 2007 allows to identify a perfect symmetry in the footprint of the buildings at 27 and 29. The latter, though, does not display architectural features as fine as its neighbour.

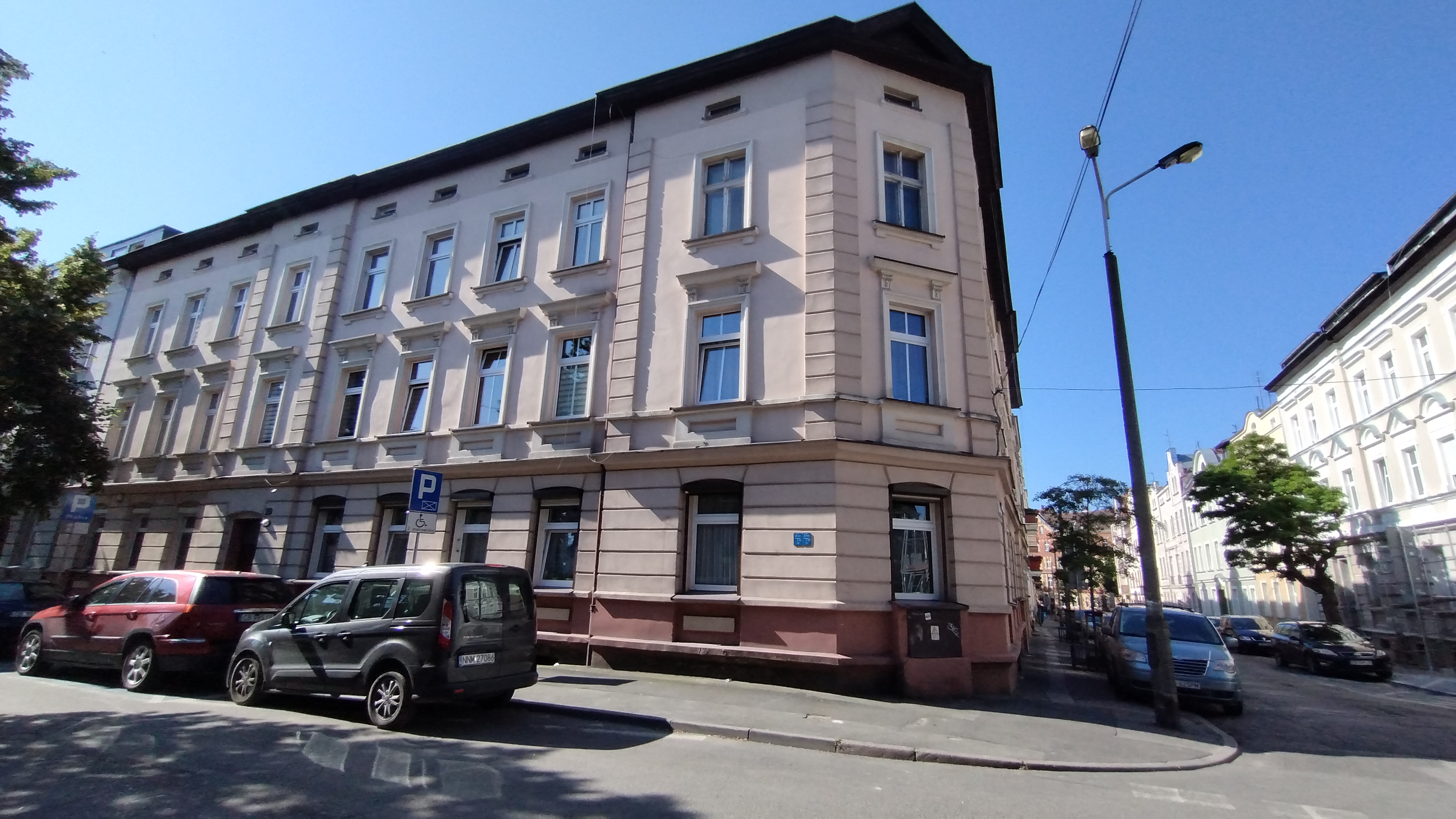
View of from the street corner

Tenement at 31, corner with 11 Siemiradzkiego street

1897-1899

Eclecticism

A glazier, Carl Baumgart was the first owner of this corner building.

The tenement is being refurbished (in June 2025). The facades of the wings stretching along both streets are decorated with, among others, pediments, cornices, panels while the ground floor is highlighted with bossage. Both individual entrances on the streets display adorned portals.

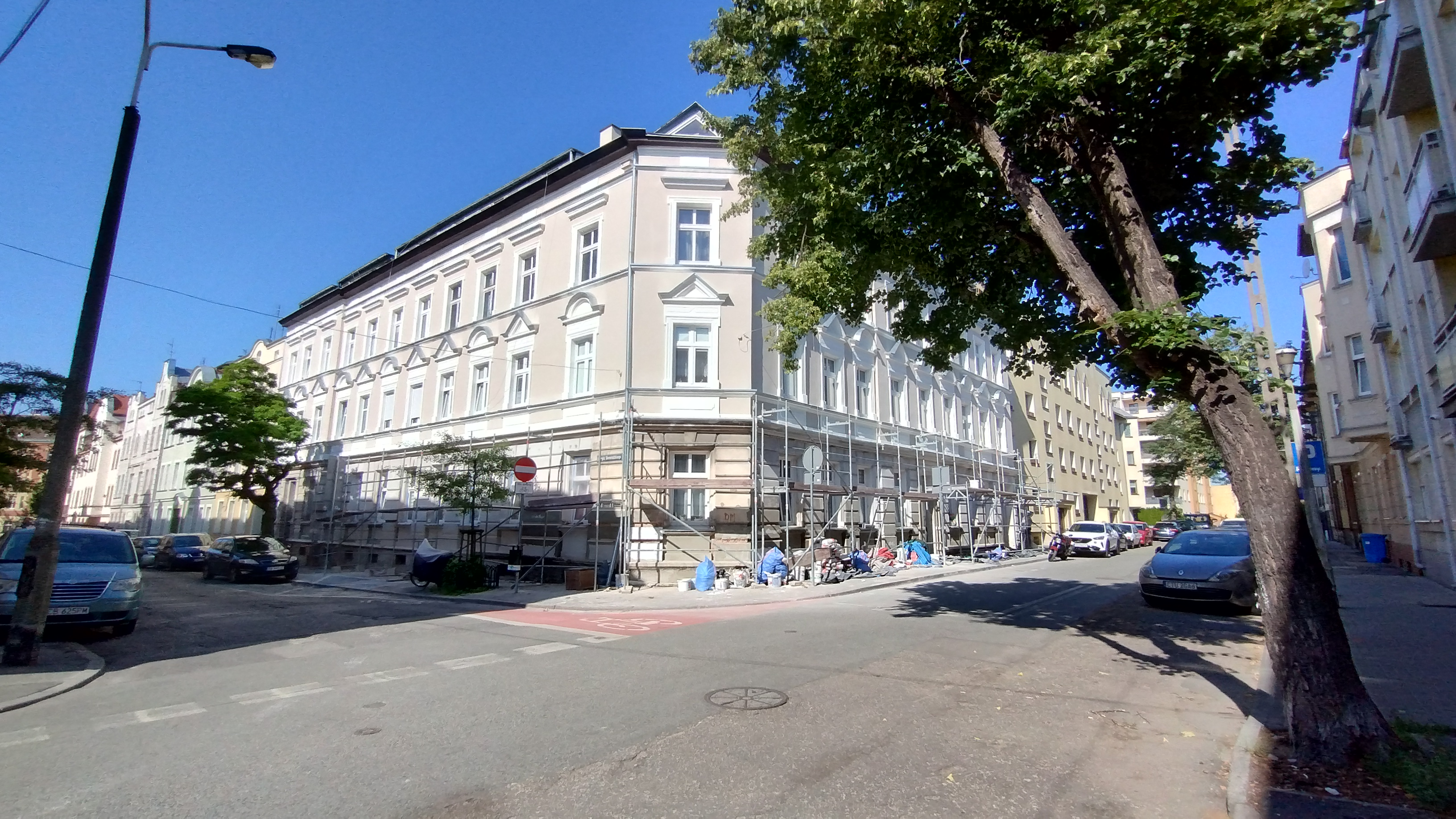
View of from the street corner

Tenement at 36

1875-1900

Eclecticism

The first proprietor of this building at then 19 Prinzenstrasse, was Mr. Tulke. He was registered as a lithographer in 1876. In 1920, the place housed a cigar factory, Bydgoska Fabryka Cygar - Tow. Akcyjne, the first of its kind in Bydgoszcz. In 1922, in the first year of full production, the factory produced 75,000 to 100,000 cigars per week. Following the establishment of the Polish Tobacco Monopoly in 1922, the company collapsed in 1924.

The building ground floor has been renovated in 2017.

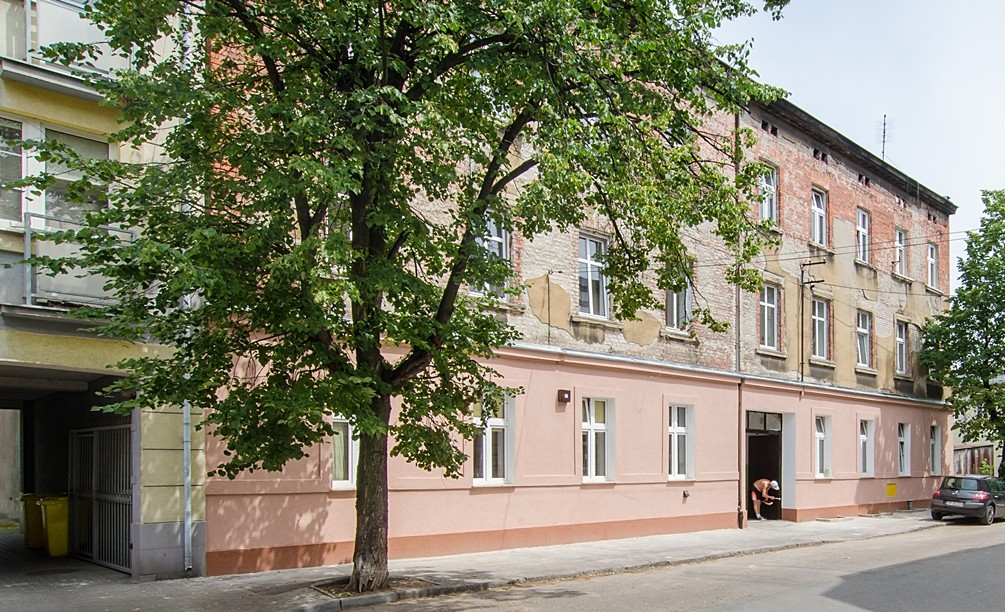
View from the street

Tenement at 42

1910

Late Art Nouveau, early modernism

Albert Teste was the landlord of this tenement, as well as the abutting one at Nr 40 (non-existent). Teste ran a restaurant at then 18 Prinzenstrasse (Nr 40).

The refurbished facade exhibits plastered friezes and festoons. Between the two bay windows, the window framing are highlighted with vertical pilasters, typical of modern architecture.

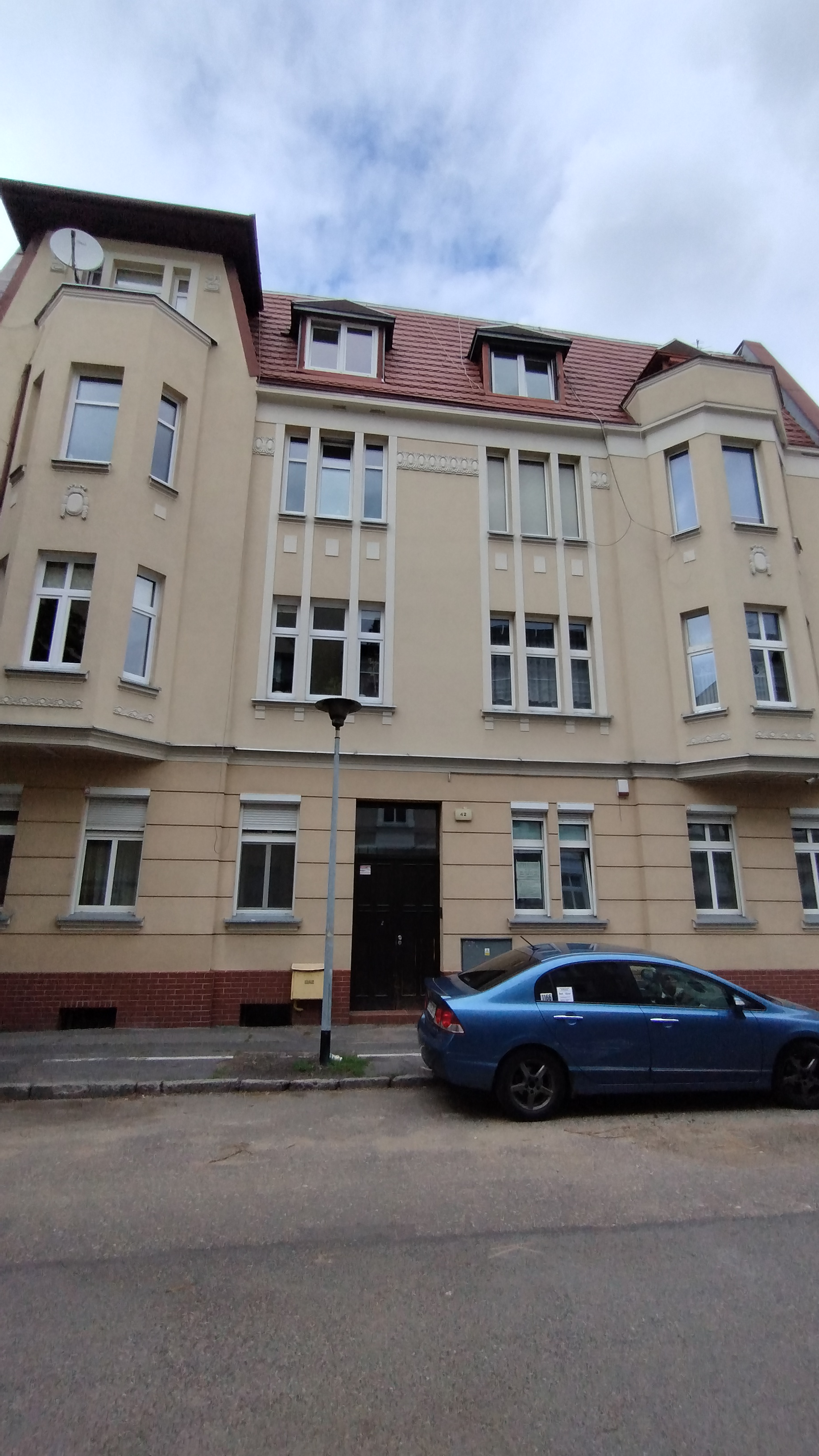
Main facade

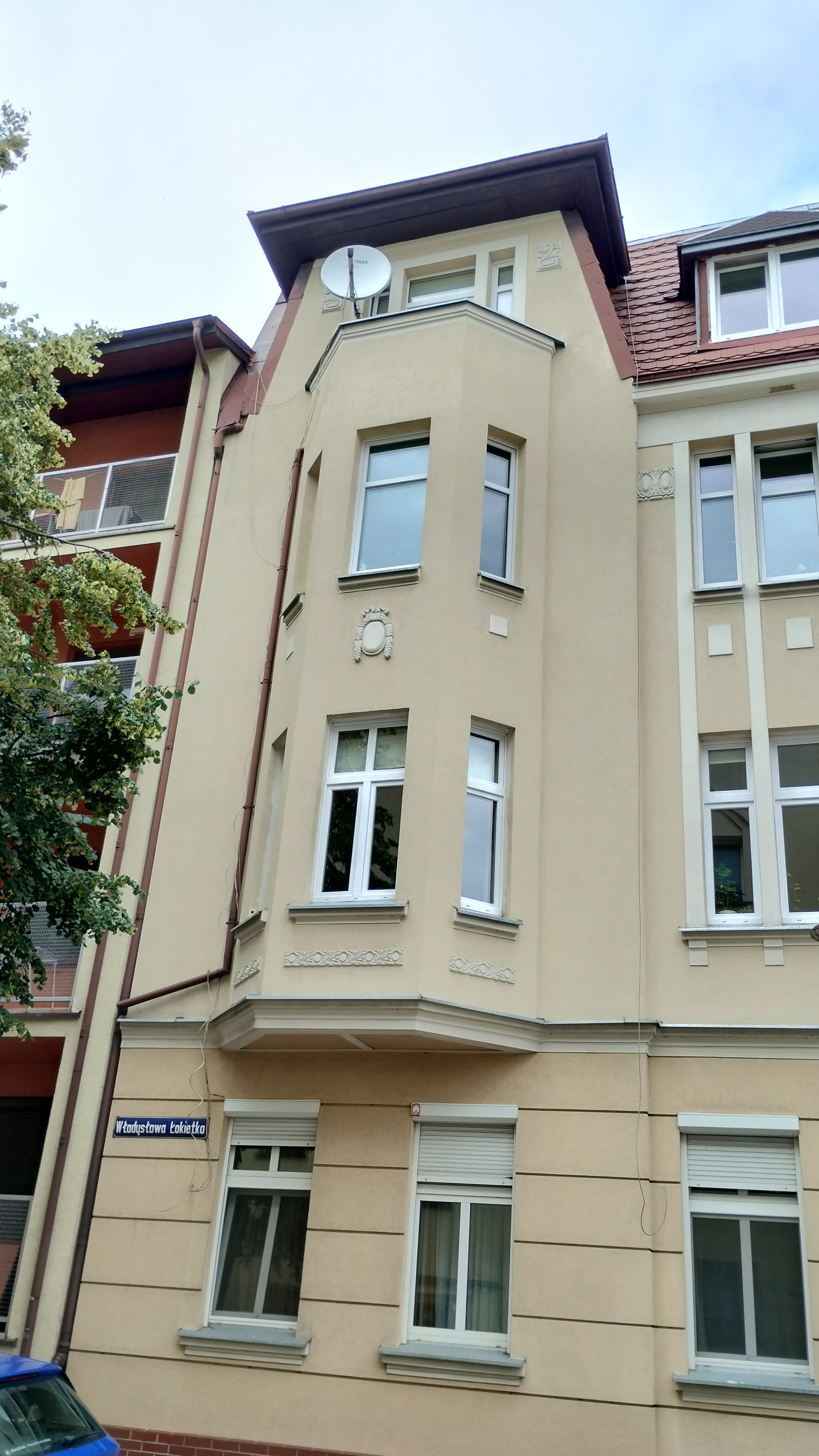
Detail of a bay window

Residence at 46

2022

Modern architecture

A residence, Łokietka 46, has been constructed in 2022 by the developer Pubr.

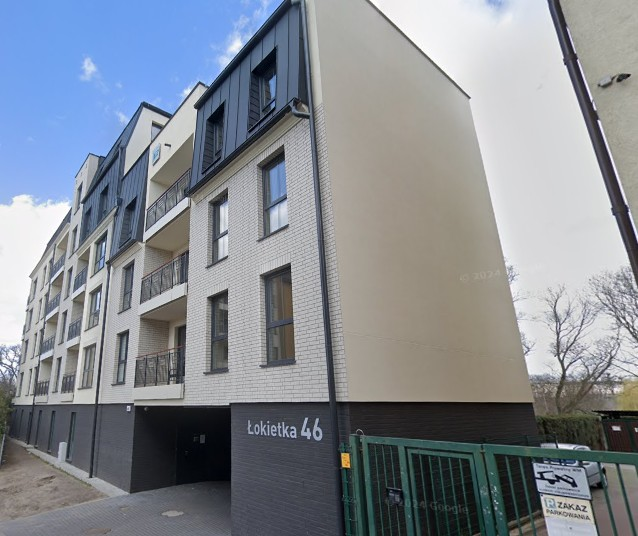
View from the street

House at 52

Early 1870s

This old building was initially registered at 13 Prinzenstrasse: its first owner was Friedrich August Kromrei, a rentier. He was living at then 13 Cichorienstrasse, today's 9 Kordeckiego Street.

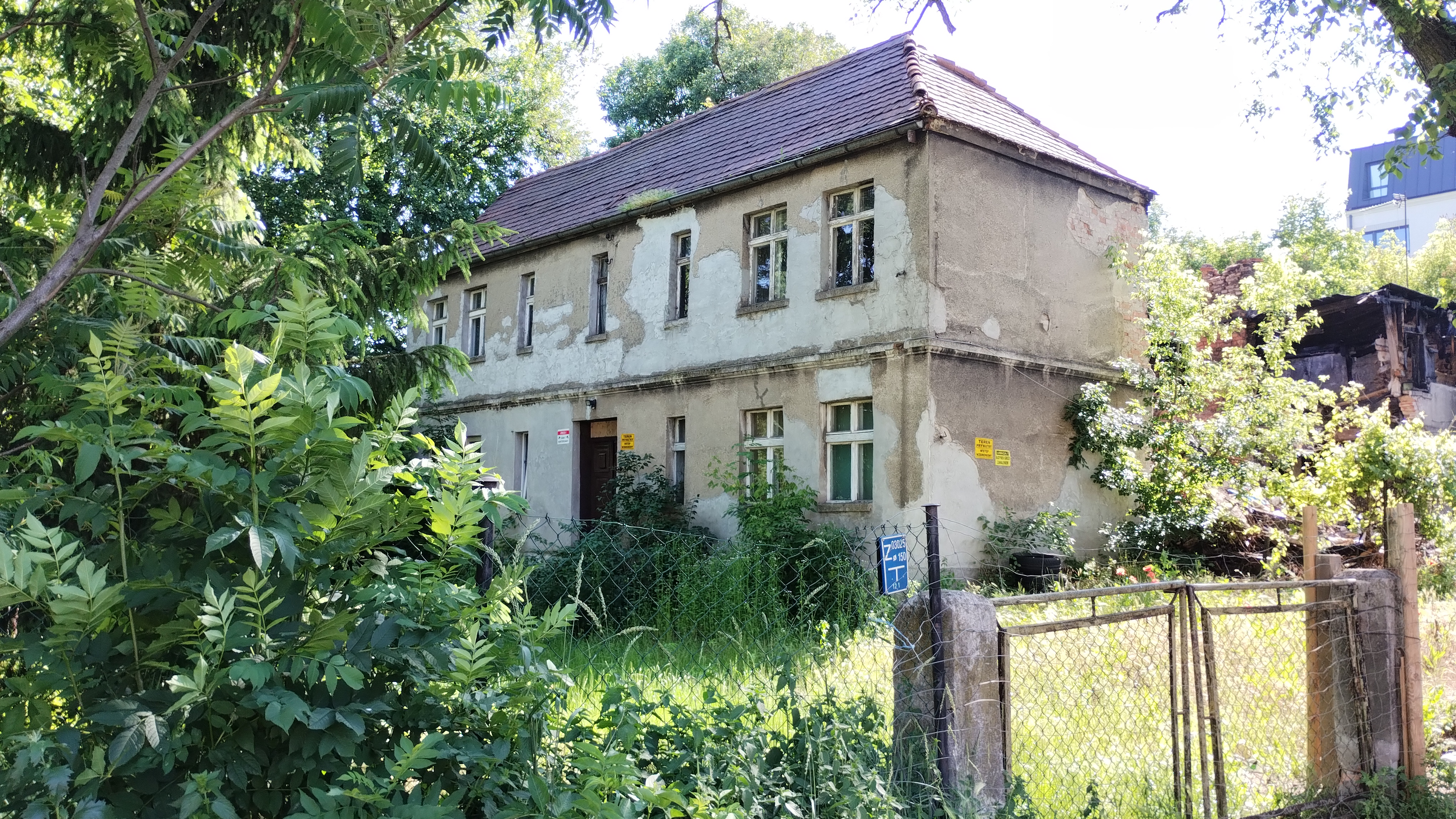
House at 62 Lokietka street

== See also ==
- Bydgoszcz
- Bydgoszcz Canal
- Brda river
- Ludwig Buchholz's Tannery
- Maksymiliana Jackowskiego Street

== Bibliography ==
- Umiński, Janusz (1996). Bydgoszcz. Przewodnik [Bydgoszcz. Guide] (in Polish). Bydgoszcz: Regionalny Oddział PTTK "Szlak Brdy".
