= Maksymiliana Jackowskiego Street, Bydgoszcz =

Street in Bydgoszcz, Poland

Maksymiliana Jackowskiego street
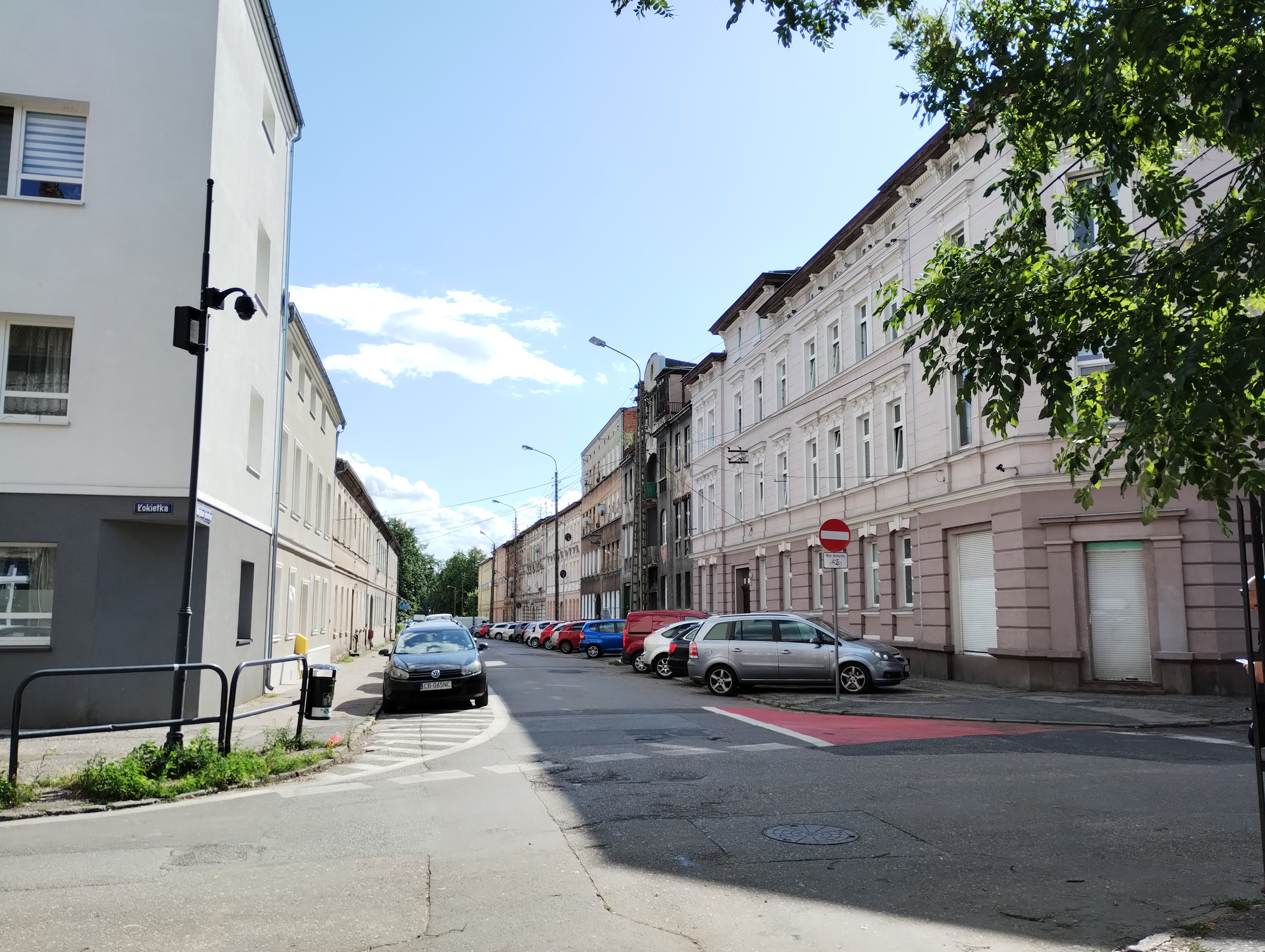
- Street view to the south

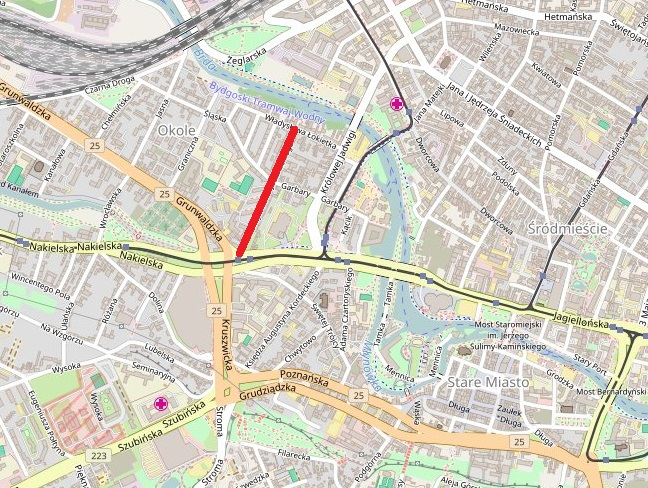
- Maksymiliana Jackowskiego street highlighted on a map
- Native name: Ulica Maksymiliana Jackowskiego w Bydgoszczy (Polish)
- Former name: Feldtraße
- Part of: Okole district
- Namesake: Maksymilian Jackowski
- Owner: City of Bydgoszcz
- Length: 500 m (1,600 ft)
- Width: c. 10 metres (33 ft)
- Location: Bydgoszcz, Poland
- Coordinates: 53°07′42″N 17°59′20″E

Construction
- Construction start: Late 1850s

Maksymiliana Jackowskiego street is a 500 metres (1,600 ft) long path in the north-west area of Bydgoszcz, Poland. Located near the Brda river, its frontages display a variety of architectural styles, from eclectic to early modernist.

== Location ==
Located in the Okole district, the street follows a roughly north to south track, parallel to Królowej Jadwigi Street. The path stems from Focha Street in the south, crosses Garbary and Śląska streets before ending at Łokietka street, less than 100 metres (110 yd) from the southern bank of the Brda river.

== History ==
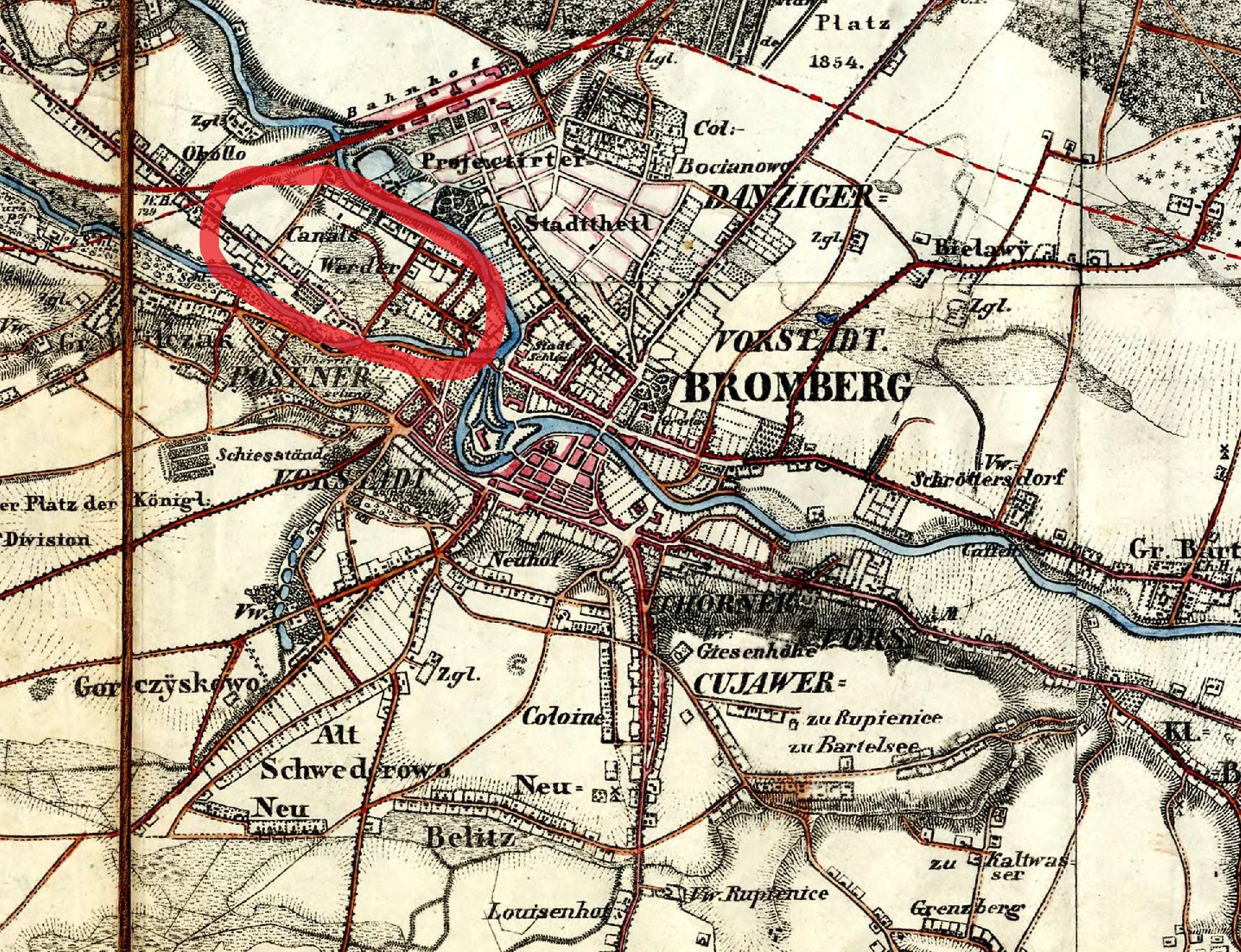
Canalswerder area on an 1857 map

Historically, the path is laid on the area called canalswerder (English: canal islet) in the 19th century, depicting the region locked between the Brda river bed on the north and the Bydgoszcz Canal on the south. Nowadays, the sector is even cut off in the north-west by a second section of the Bydgoszcz canal, built in the early 20th century.

Until the mid-1970s, Jackowskiego street was the main connection between the western part of the city and the railway station.

In the 1970s, part of the Old Canal was filled in, allowing for the construction of the "Grunwaldzkie Roundabout": as a consequence, the southern tip of the street was changed to a dead end for car access from Focha street. Only pedestrians can pass through.

Jackowskiego street appeared on a first city address book in 1855, with only five landlords registered.

The street bore only two names through time:

- 19th century - 1920 and during German occupation, Feldstraße;
- 1920 - 1939 and since 1945, Ulica Maksymiliana Jackowskiego.

The current appellation refers to Maksymilian Jackowski (1815–1905), a Polish social and economic activist.

== Main areas and edifices ==
=== Tenement at 1/3 Grunwaldzka Street, corner with Jackowskiego street ===
Built in 1910, by Theodor Patzwald

Early modernism

The first owners of the tenement were the Goltz brothers (Gustaw, Rudolf and Oskar) who, as construction managers, conducted many projects in the city. In July 1912, a restaurant and a cafe -Parkhaus- were arranged, with an area as a summer garden: at that time, the place was giving onto the Bydgoszcz Canal, which was covered only in the 1970s. The same year, the Goltz brothers sold the ensemble to C.A. Franke, a successful local entrepreneur. In that period, the building housed the office of the then Royal School of Arts and Crafts, as well as the house designer, architect Theodor Patzwald.

Later on, during the interwar, the landlord was August Latte, owner of a cheese warehouse and a factory. During the recent renovation of the ensemble in 2015, a mural was created on the wall deprived of opening: it displays advertising with old-fashioned features from the 1920s.

The early modernist style still keeps influence from Art Nouveau: curved bow windows, a broken segmental pediment, a vegetal motif and two grand loggias adorned with slender columns and wrought iron grillwork.

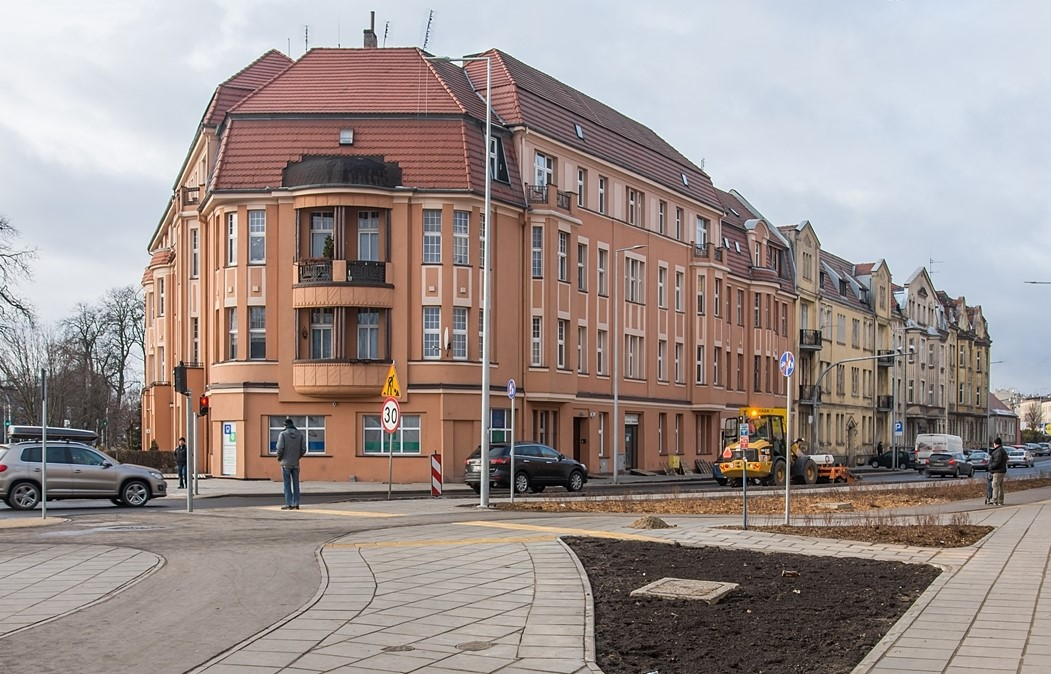
View of the ensemble at 1/3

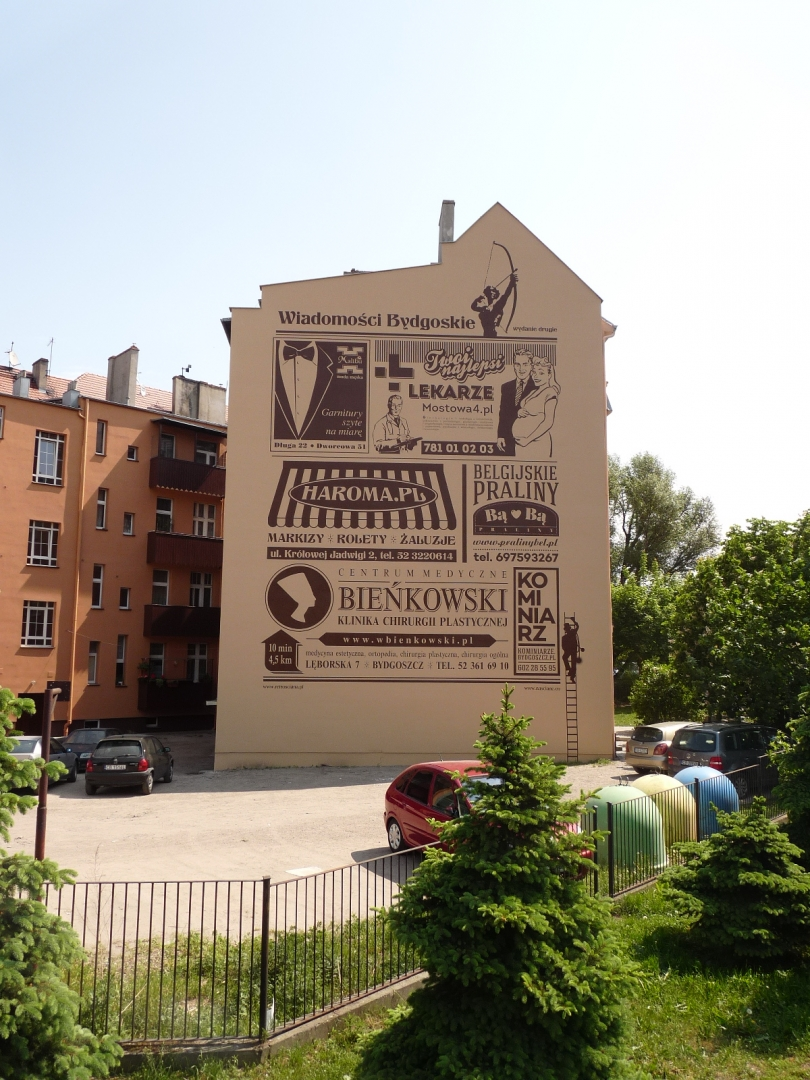
Old-fashion style advert mural

=== Tenement at 1 ===
Early 20th century

Late Art Nouveau

The commissioner of the building was Hermann Templin, a butcher living at 5 "KornMarkt" (present day "Zbożowy Rynek").

The large frontage presents bell-dome shaped wall-gables, as well as balustrades on the first floor and windows with decorated lintels.

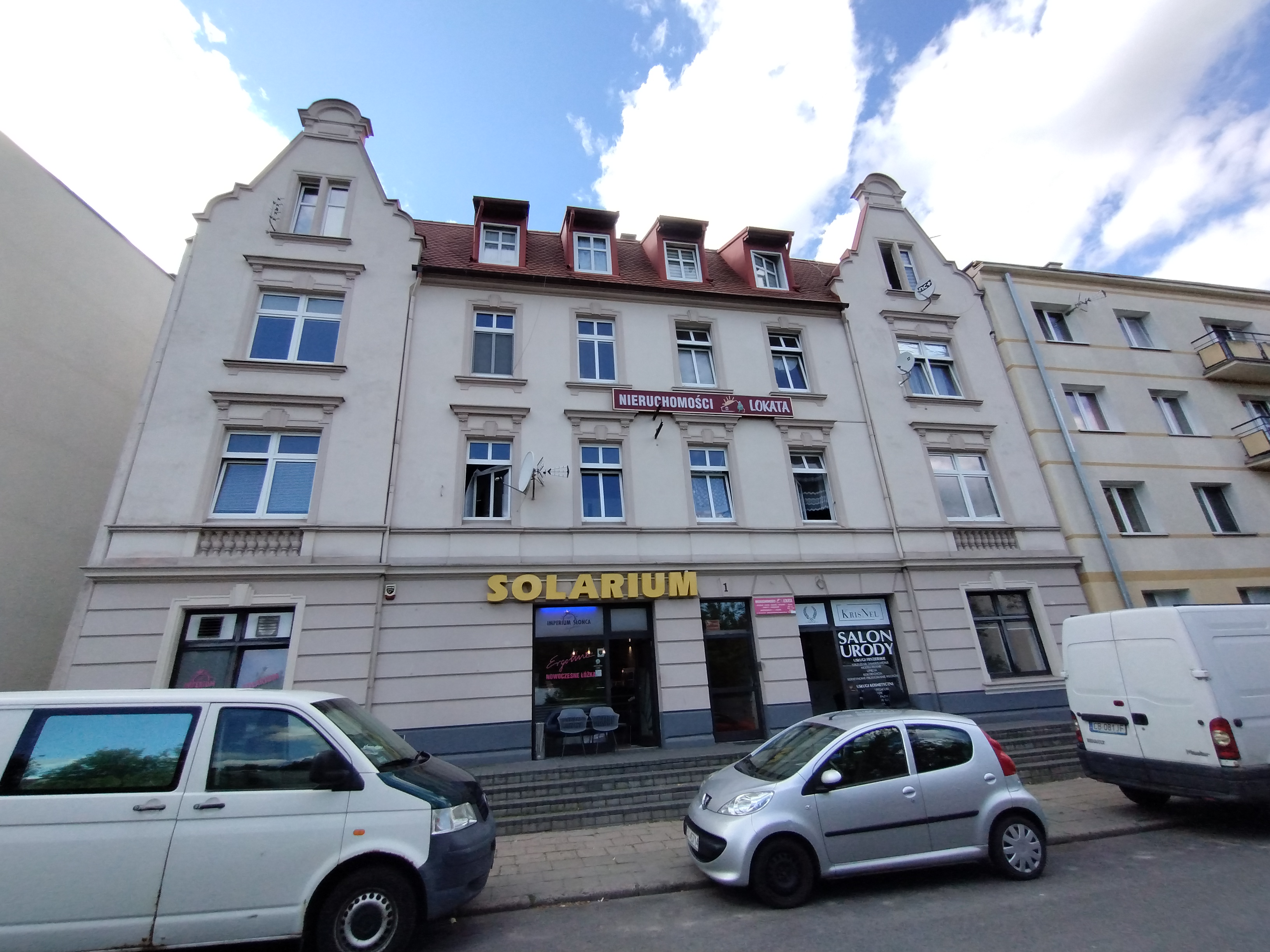
Main frontage

=== Tenement at 3 ===
1950s

Modern architecture

The plot had been devoted for gardening till the early 1930s. In 1933, a coal dealer, "Węglopol", moved there. The present building dates back to post-WWII period.

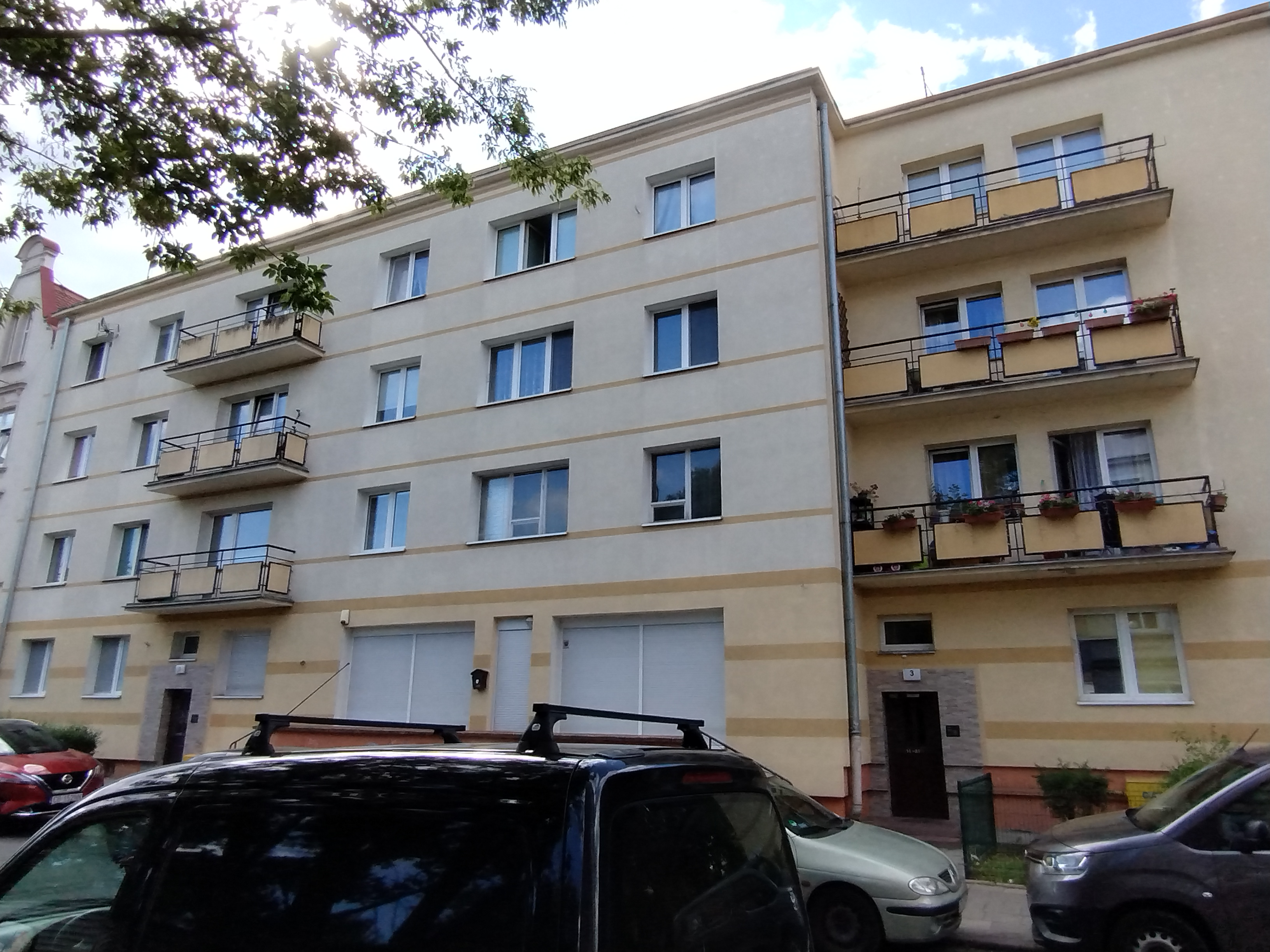
View from the street

=== Plots at 4/6 ===
Today unbuilt, the area used to host:

- till 1920, a brewery run by Albert Hirchbruch, Brauerei und Etablissement dem Kauffmann Hirchbruch. During the German period, it was registered at 37-38-39 Feldstraße;
- after 1920, there was a warehouse of the Okocim Brewery.

=== Tenement at 8 ===
1902-1911

Modern architecture

First landlord was Franz Lehmann, running a basket workshop.

The edifice has been renovated in 2022 and displays many architectural details: pediments, cornices, bossaged ground floor and a portal.

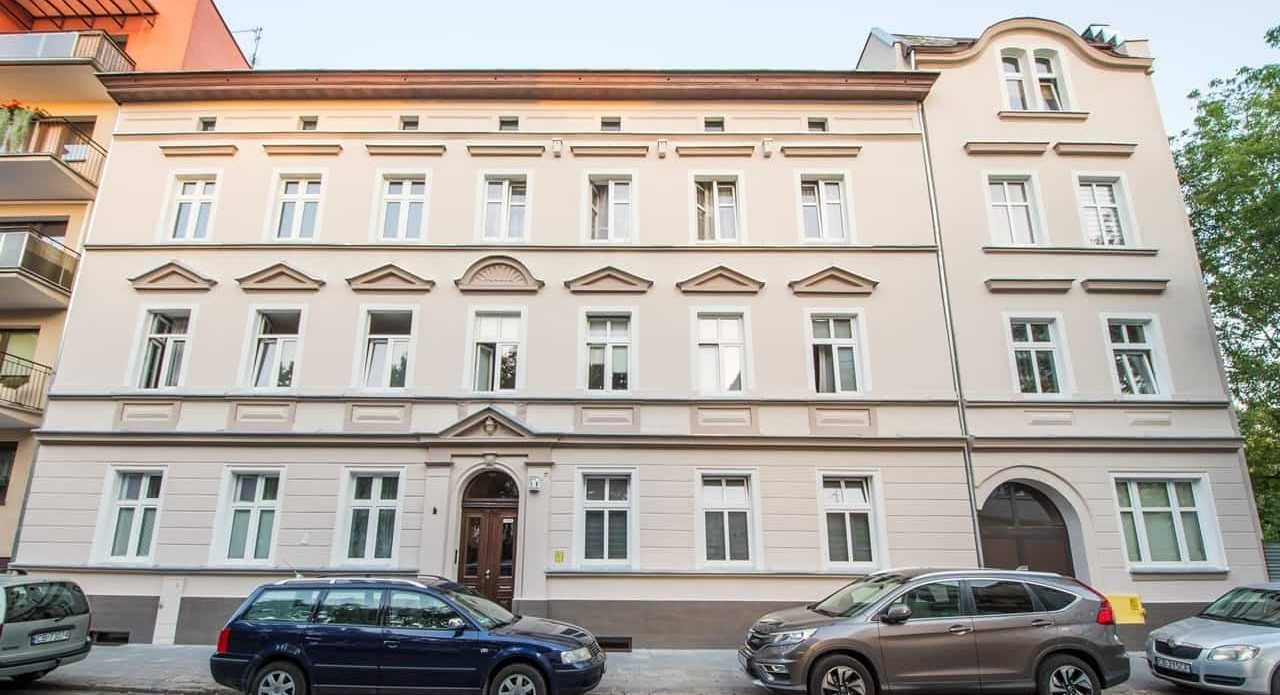
Facade

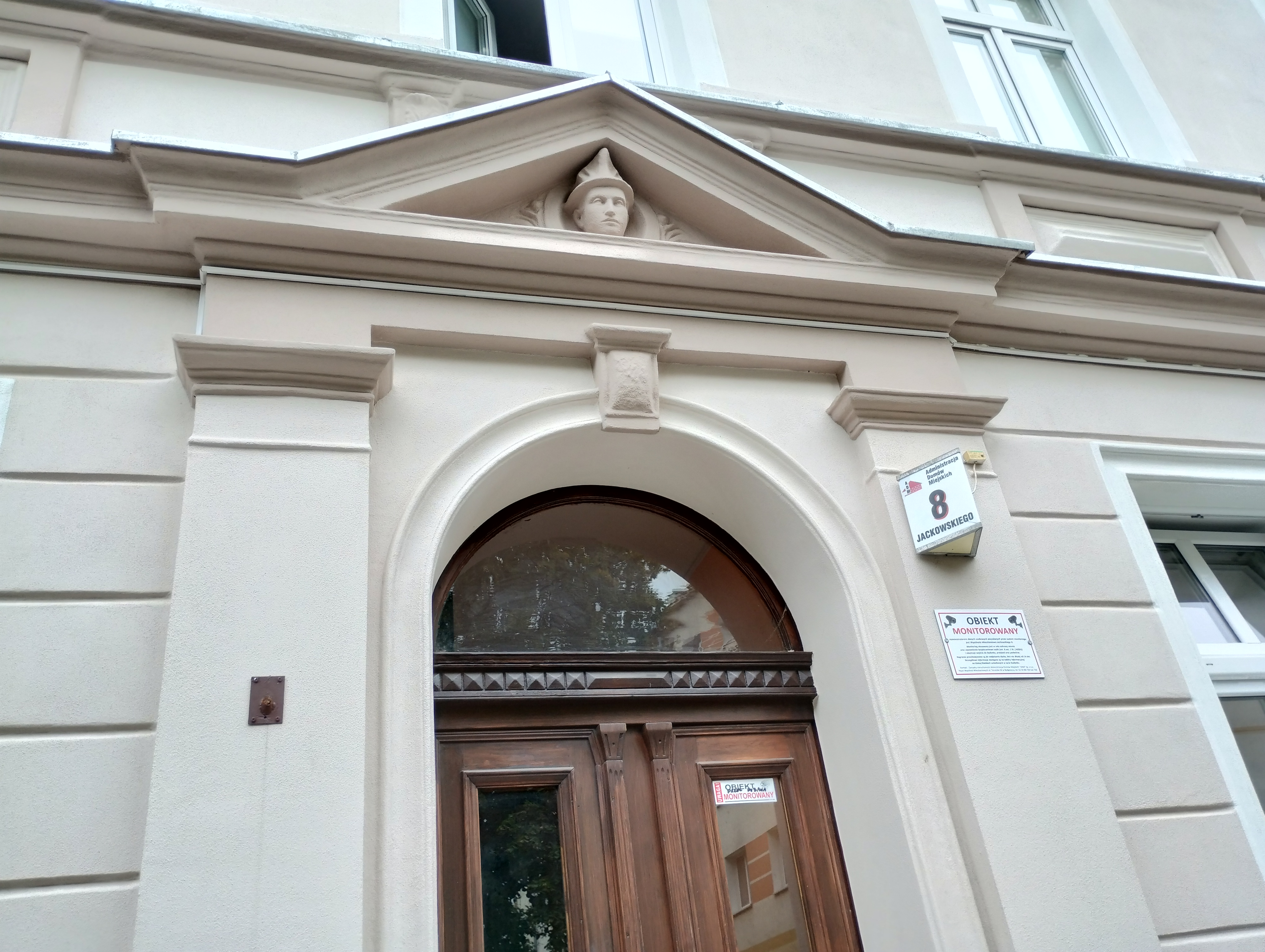
Details of the portal

=== Tenement at 14 ===
1910

Late Art Nouveau

Albert Hirchbruch, owner of the brewery at 4/6, commissioned the tenement.

The building was refurbished in 2014 and boasts, among other elements, two symmetrical bay windows topped by a terrace and a preserved Art Nouveau wooden door.

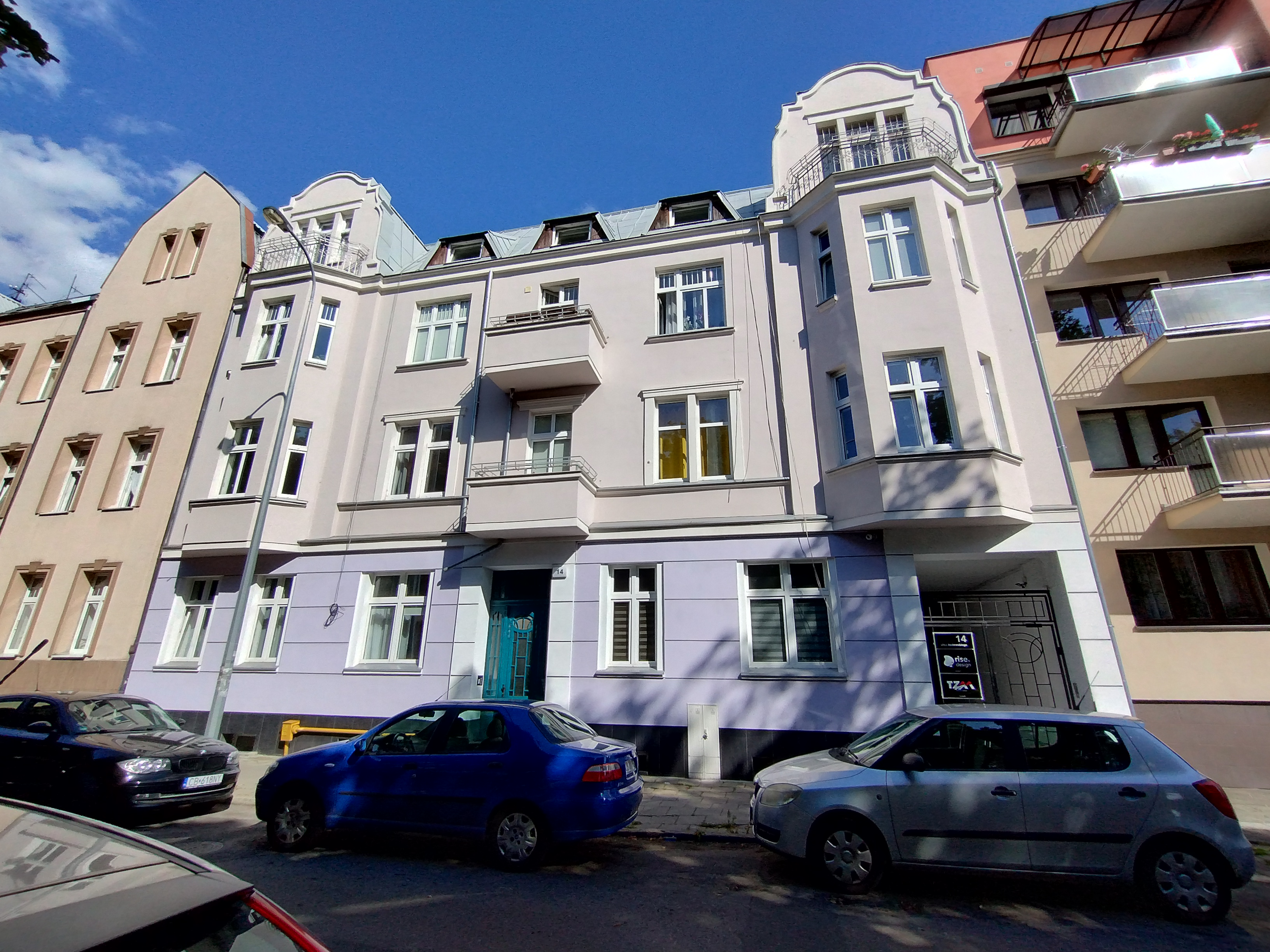
View of the facade from the street

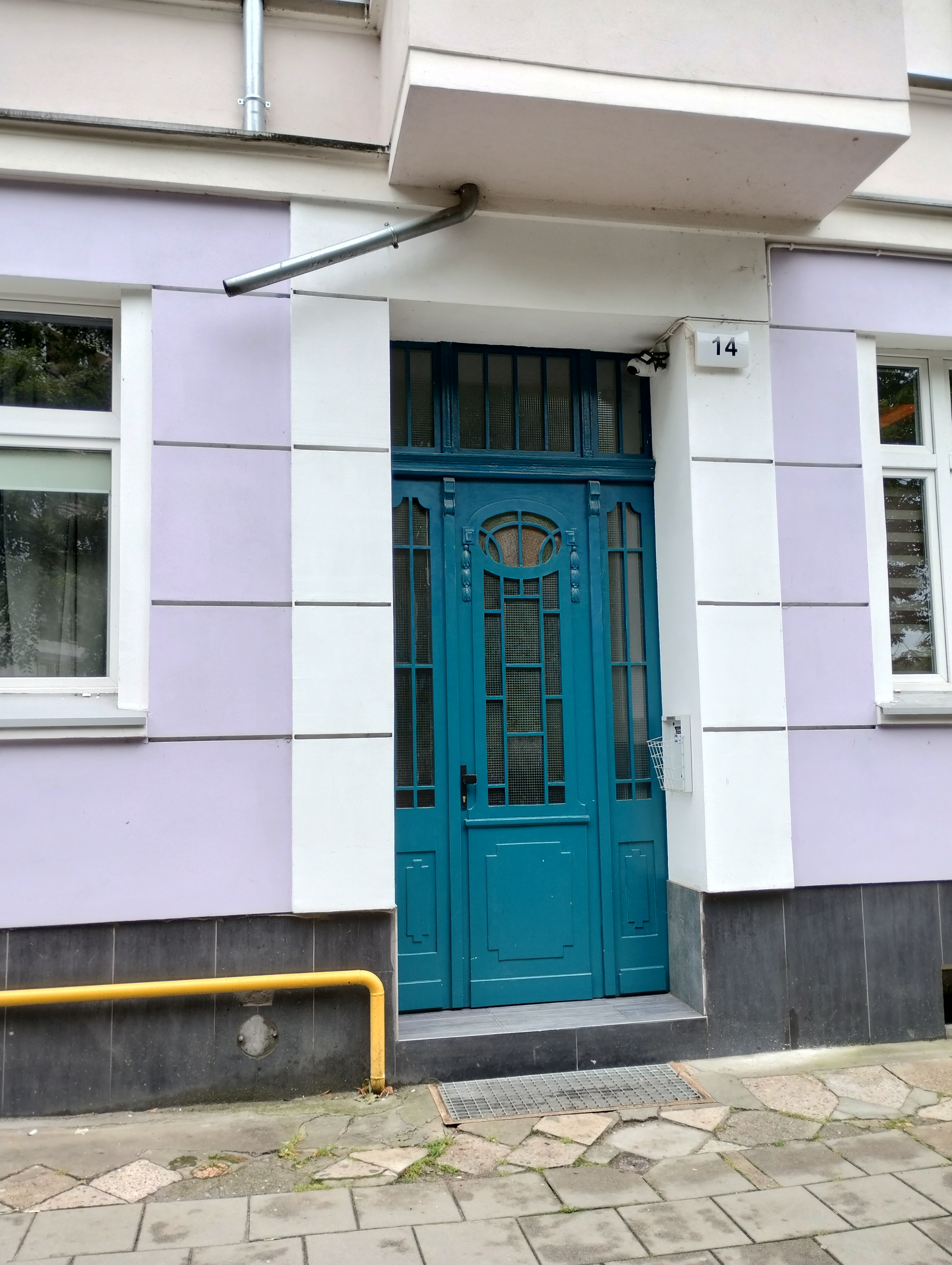
Entrance door details

=== Tenement at 1 Śląska street, corner with Jackowskiego street ===
Early 20th century

Late Art Nouveau

The plot, then at "1 Werder straße", was a garden till 1910. In 1911, Josef Grabowski, a painter, had the tenement erected. In the 1910s, a kitchenware shop (German: Magazin für Küche and Haus) occupied the ground floor.

This building (renovated in 2016) presents two large frontages, both with a bay window and a wide wall gable. The corner facade is topped by a ridge turret and the entrance on Śląska street is framed in a portal.

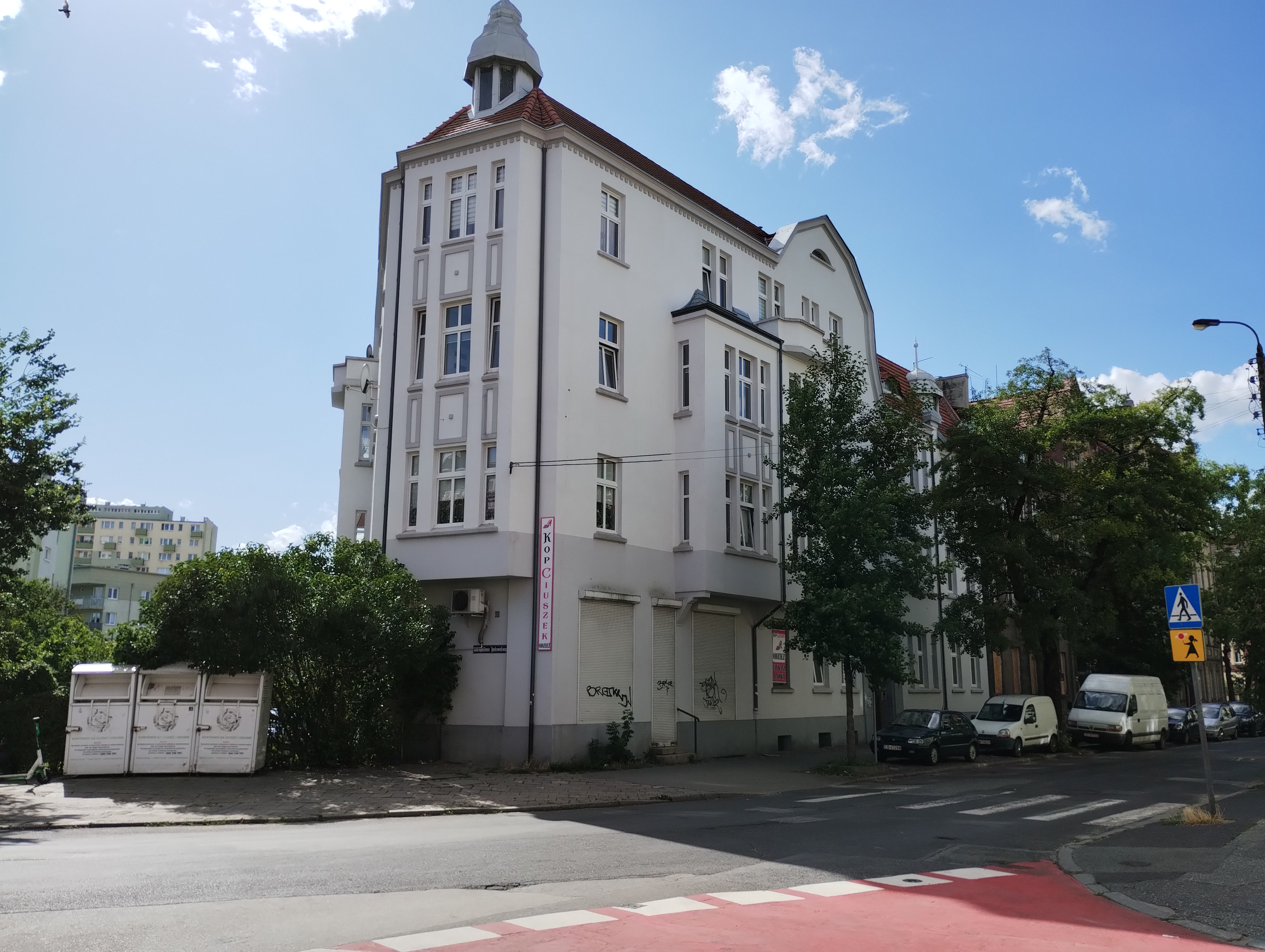
View of facades from the street crossing

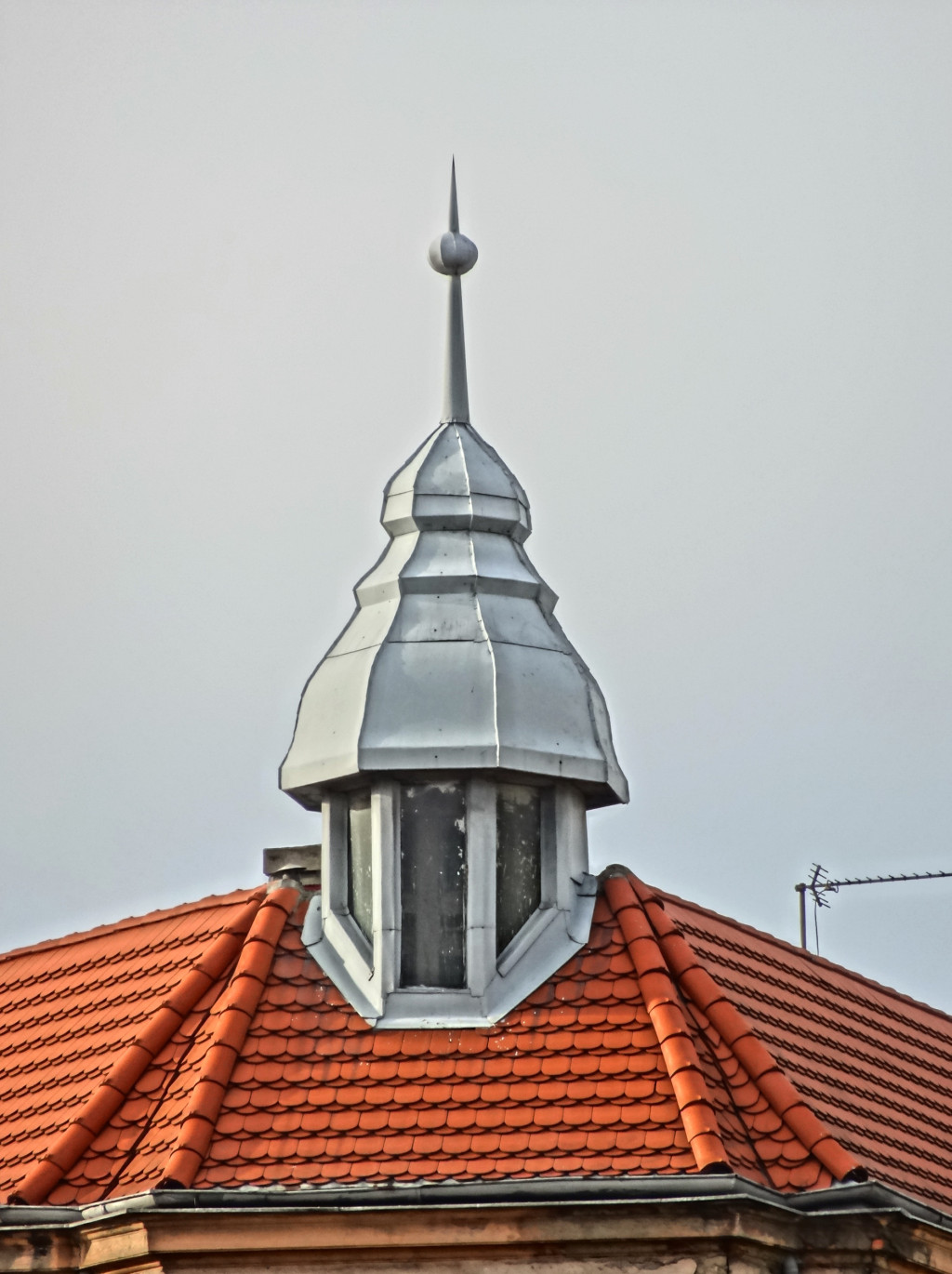
Detail of the ridge turret

=== Tenement at 15 Jackowskiego street / 2 Śląska street ===
Beginning of 20th century

Art Nouveau

The first landlord of this edifice at the corner of then "Werderstraße" and "Feldstraße" was Felix Sievert, in the potter business.

This facade onto Jackowskiego street had been restored in 2018. The edifice displays bossage details on the ground floor. One can notice in particular that all the windows of the first floor present decorated pediments.

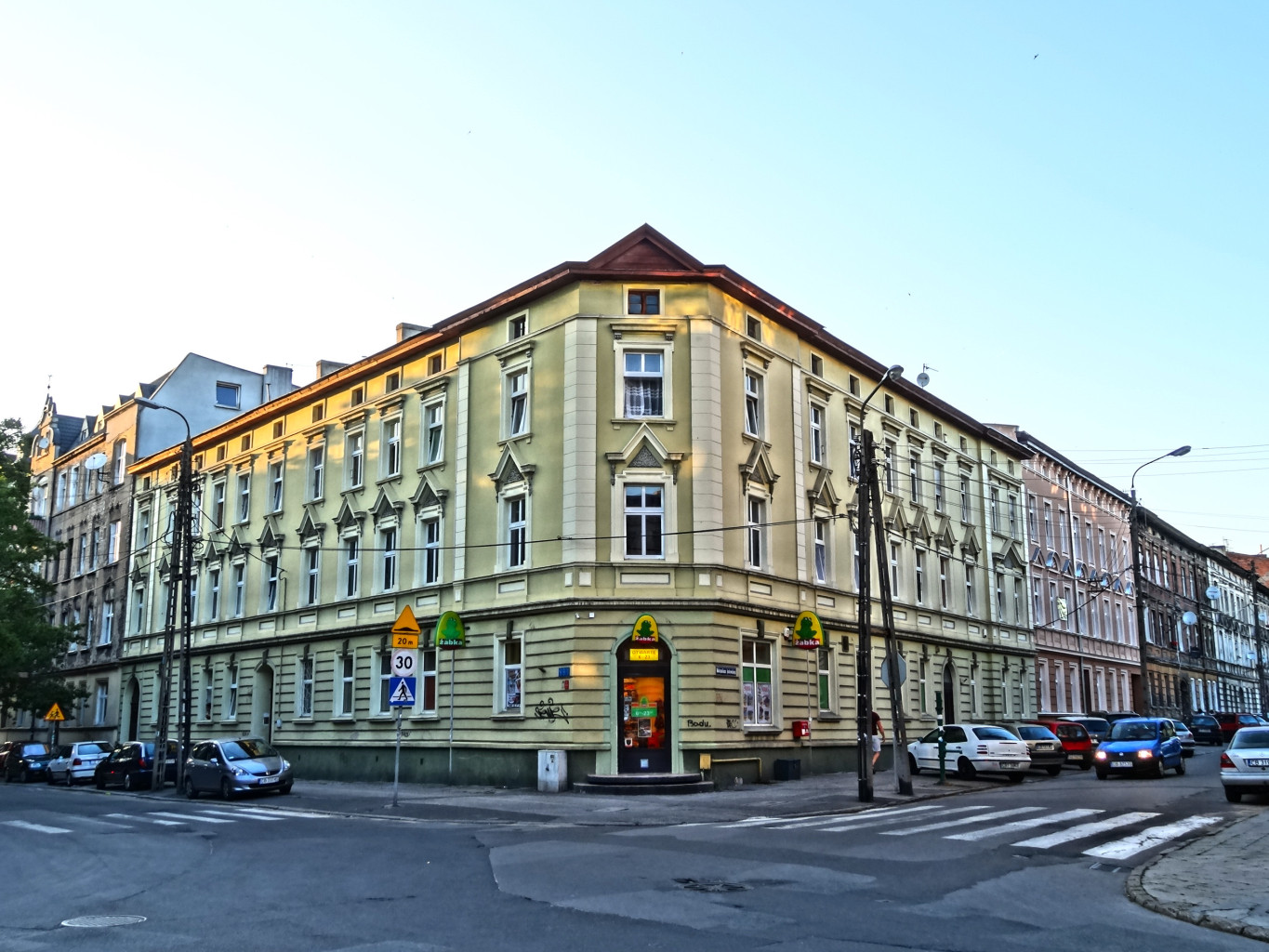
View of both facades from the street crossing

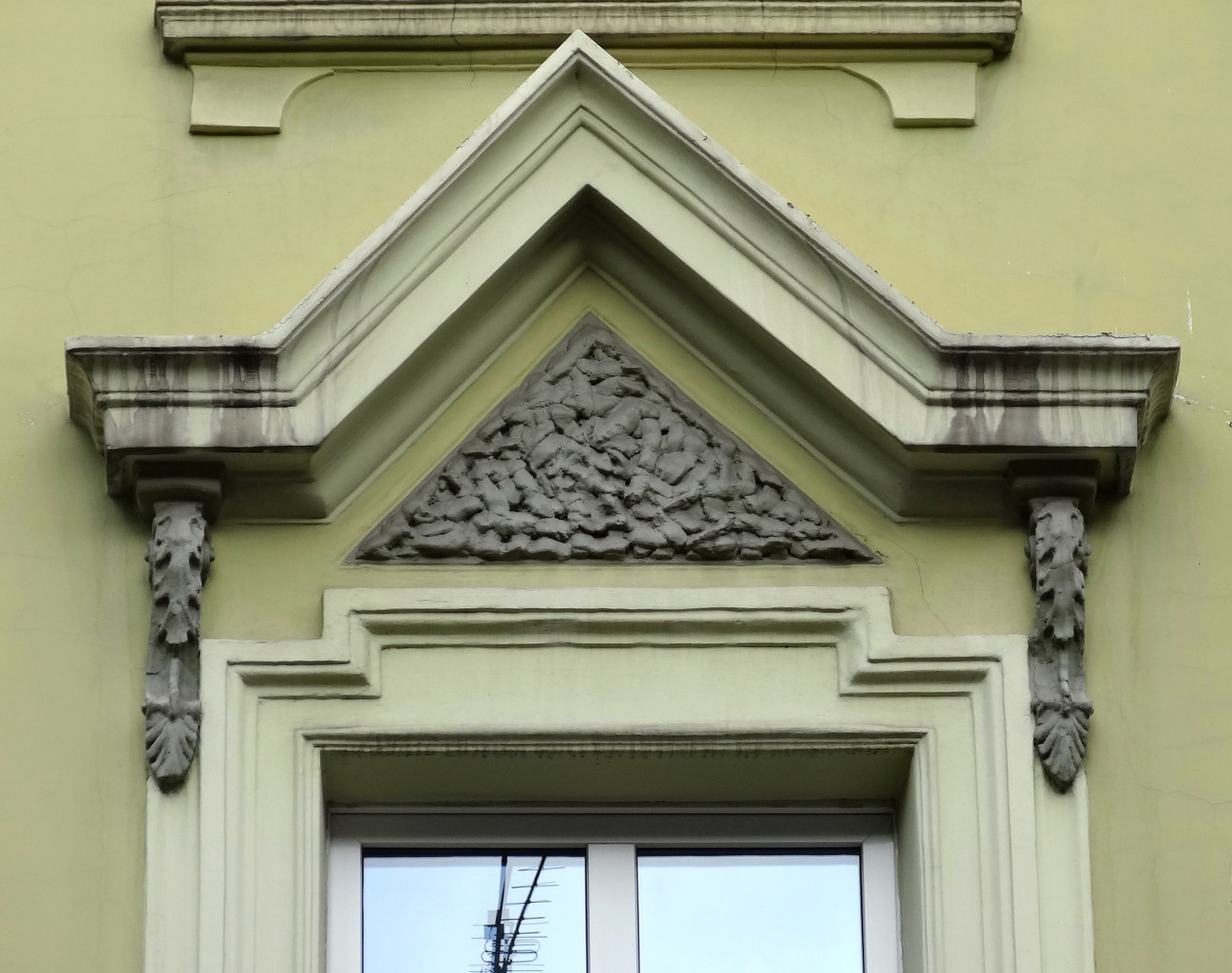
First floor decorated pediment

=== Petrikowski's tenement at 16 ===
1908-1909

Late Art Nouveau

The commissioner of this building was Johannes Petrikowski, a master painter. He had his initials "JP" incorporated into the decoration of the triangular tympanum of the pediment hanging over the main entrance.

Very few Art Nouveau details are preserved on the facade, except for the adornment of the portal which displays beautiful floral motifs in stucco.

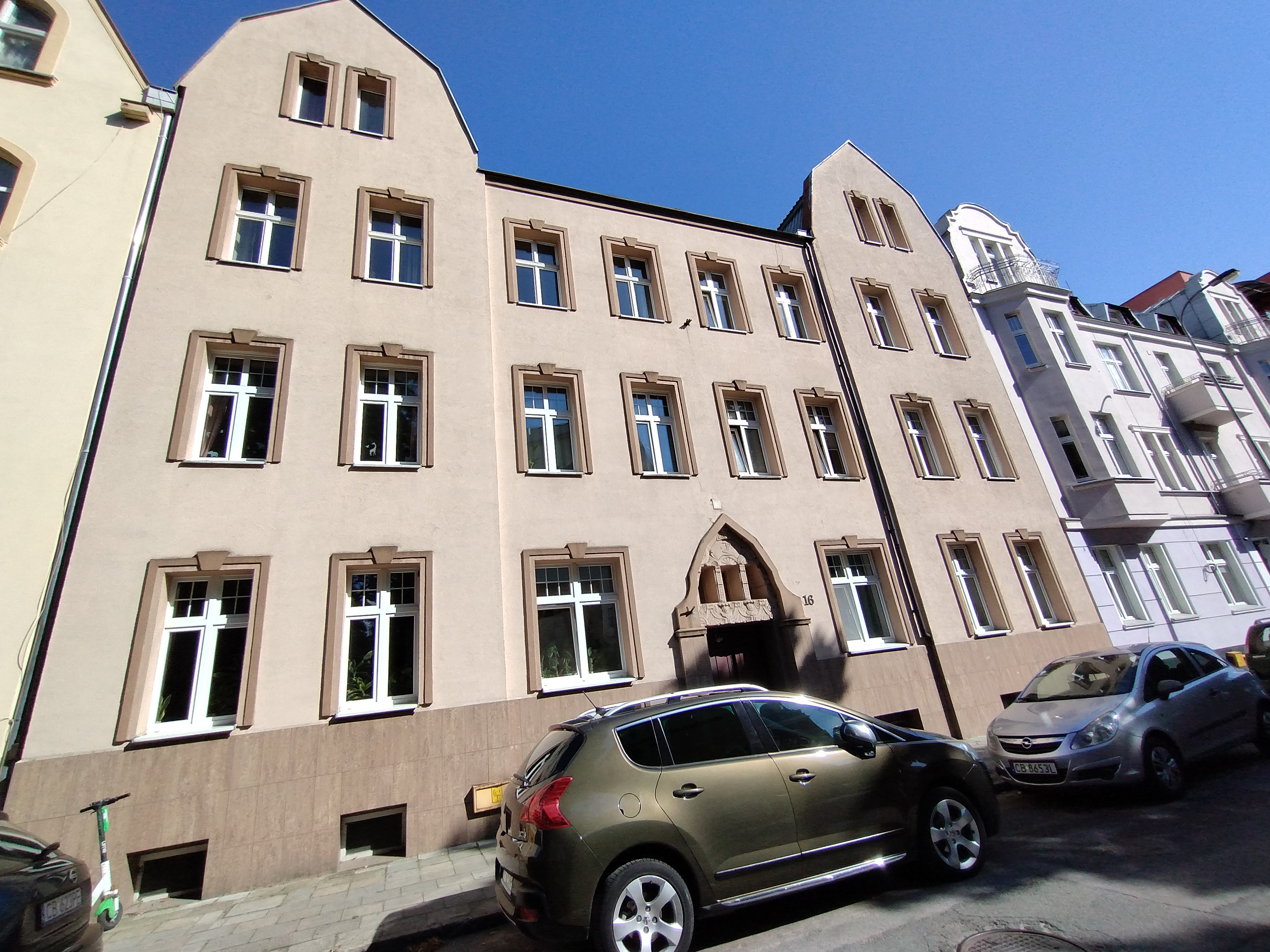
Main frontage

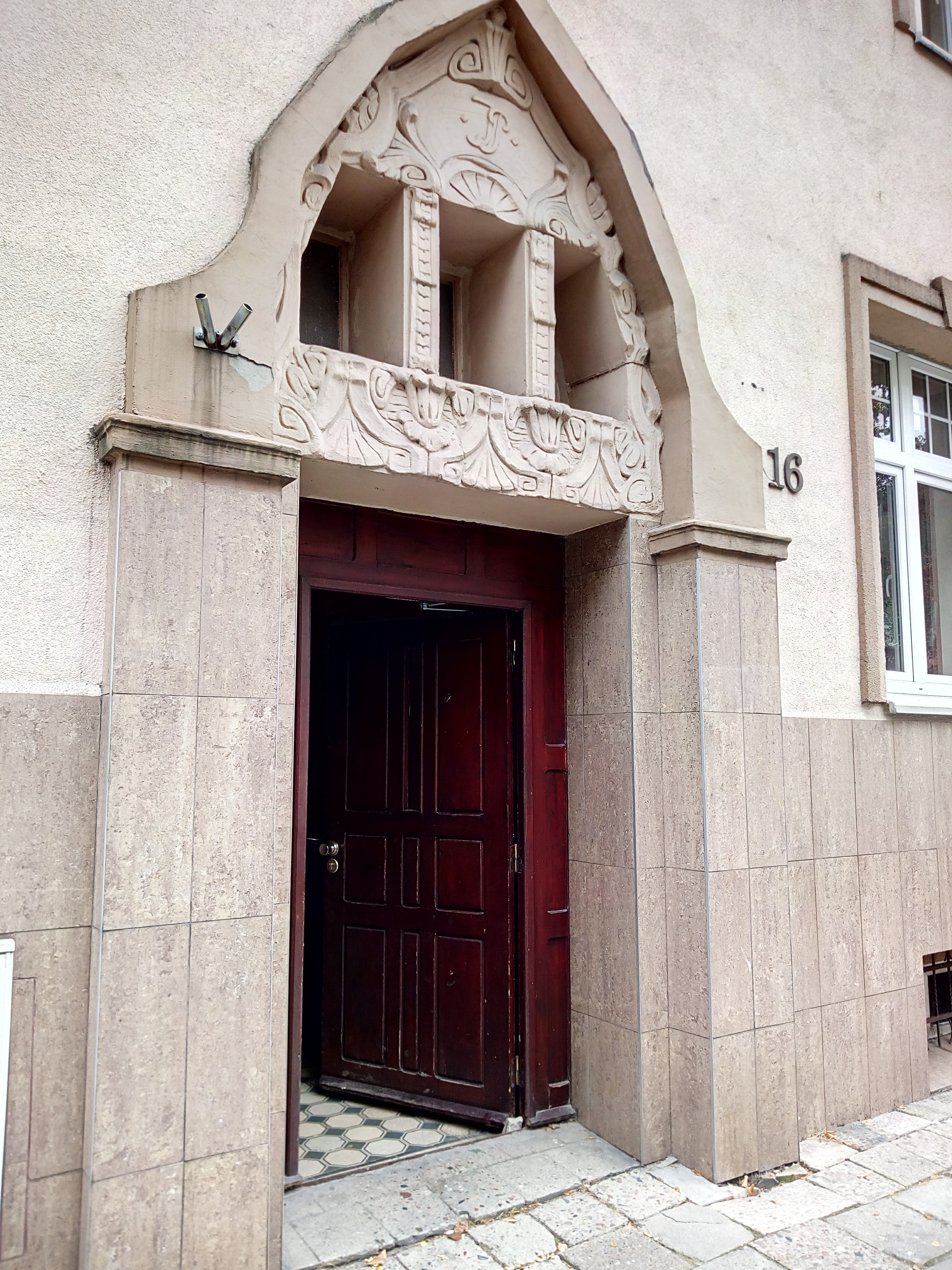
Entrance portal

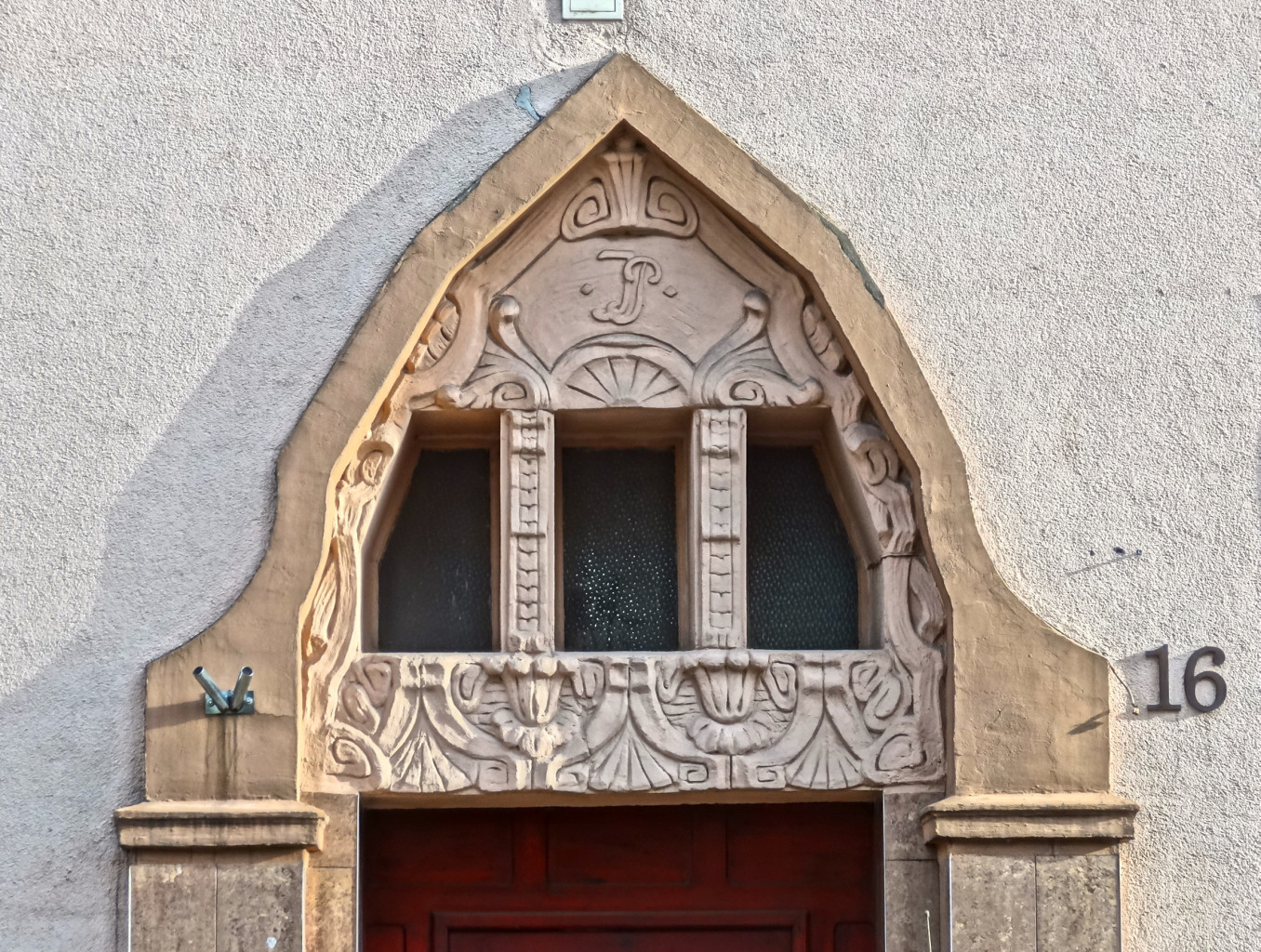
Transom light and initials

=== Tenement at 17 ===
1907

Eclecticism

Julius Baumann, a master black smith, was the first owner of this building. The first year (1907), he had been living in the abutting building at today's 16.

The tenement displays nice neoclassic features, with pedimented windows, a corbel table and preserved wooden doors.

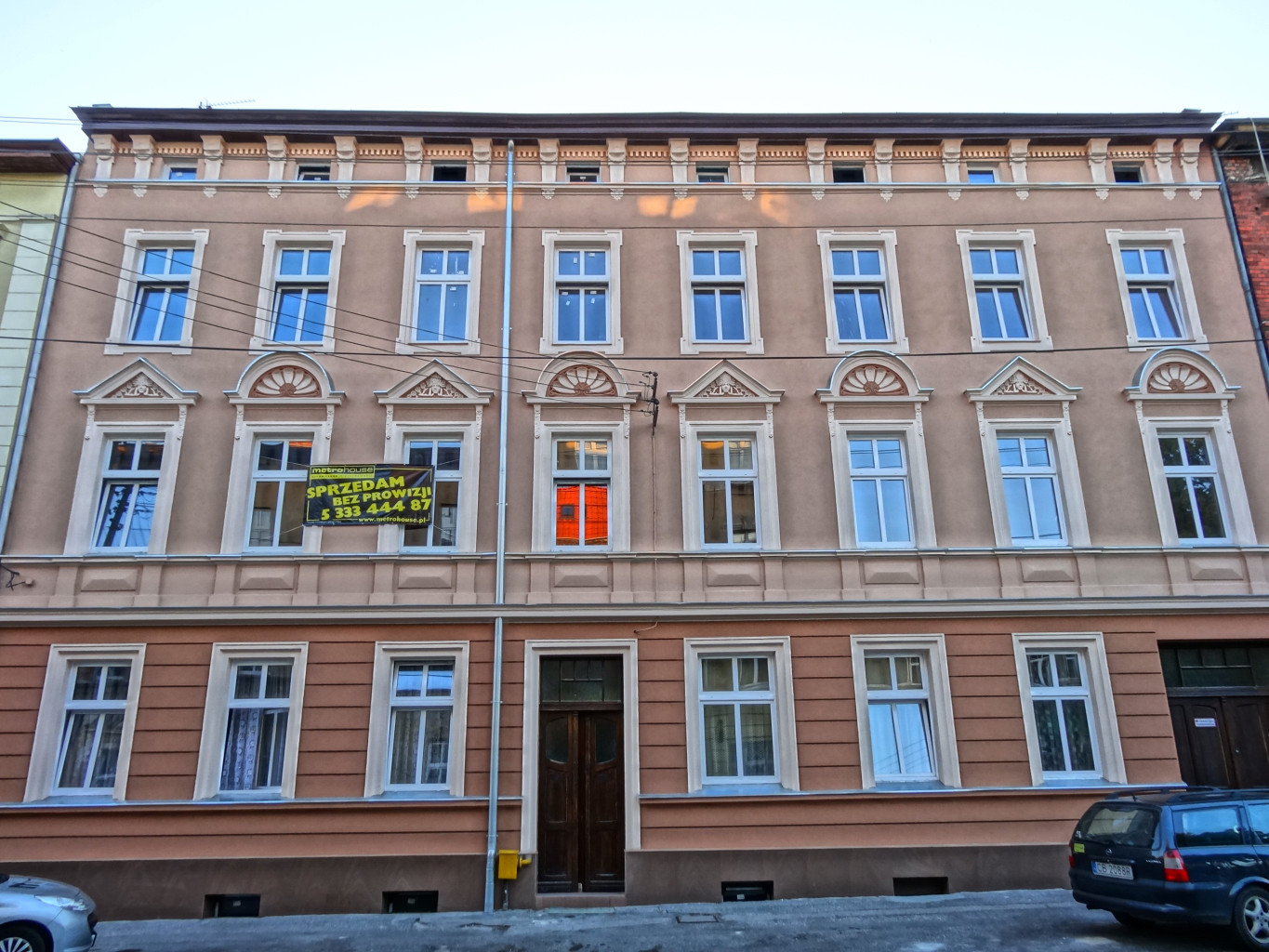
Main frontage

=== Tenement at 18 ===
1908-1909

Late Art Nouveau

Johannes Petrikowski, owner of the building at 16, was the first landlord of this edifice at then "31 Feldstraße".

Similarly to the tenement at 16, the only remarkable details reside in the decoration of the portal flanked by two columns: its lintel is crowned by the figure of a lion.

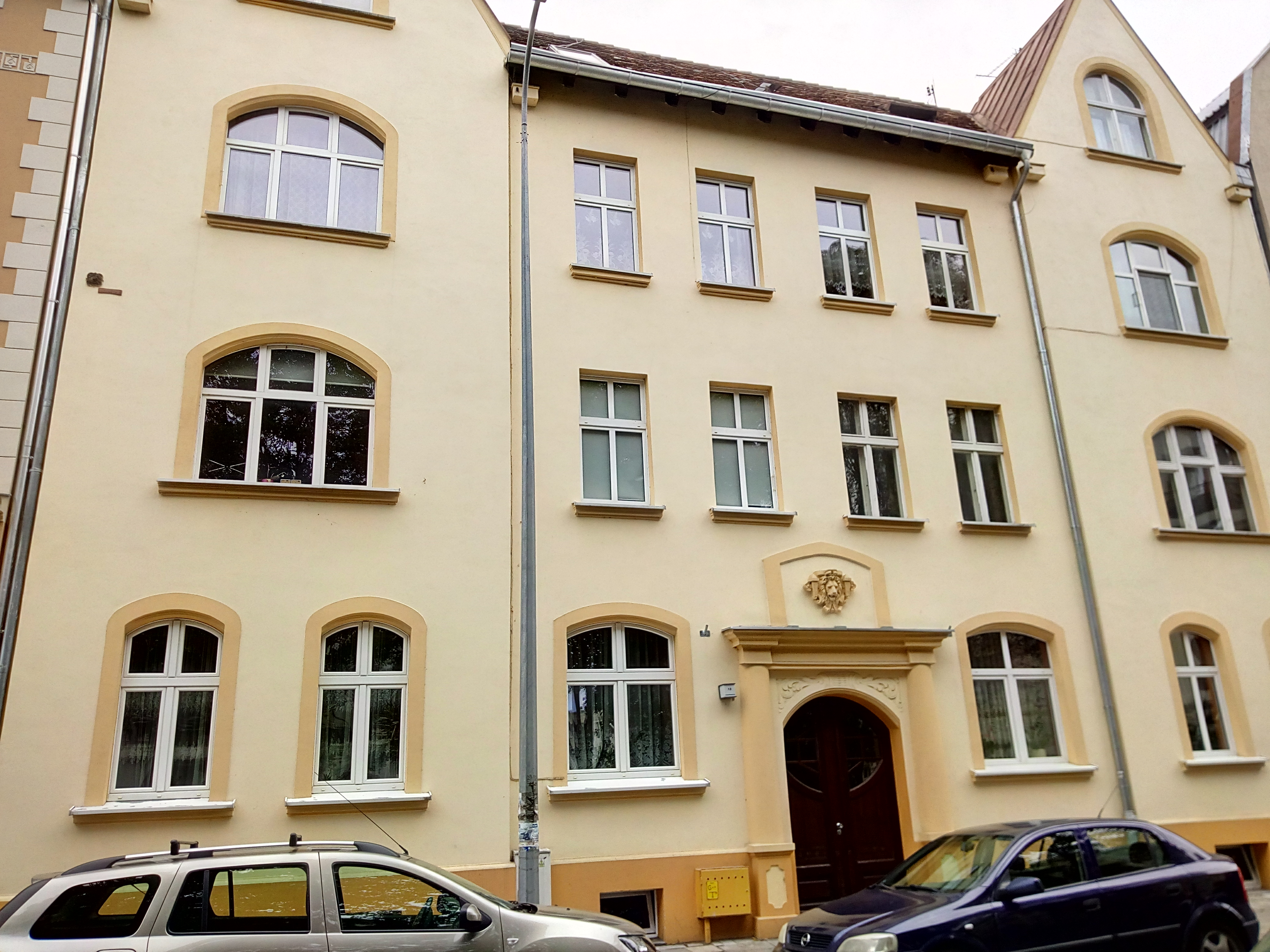
Facade on the street

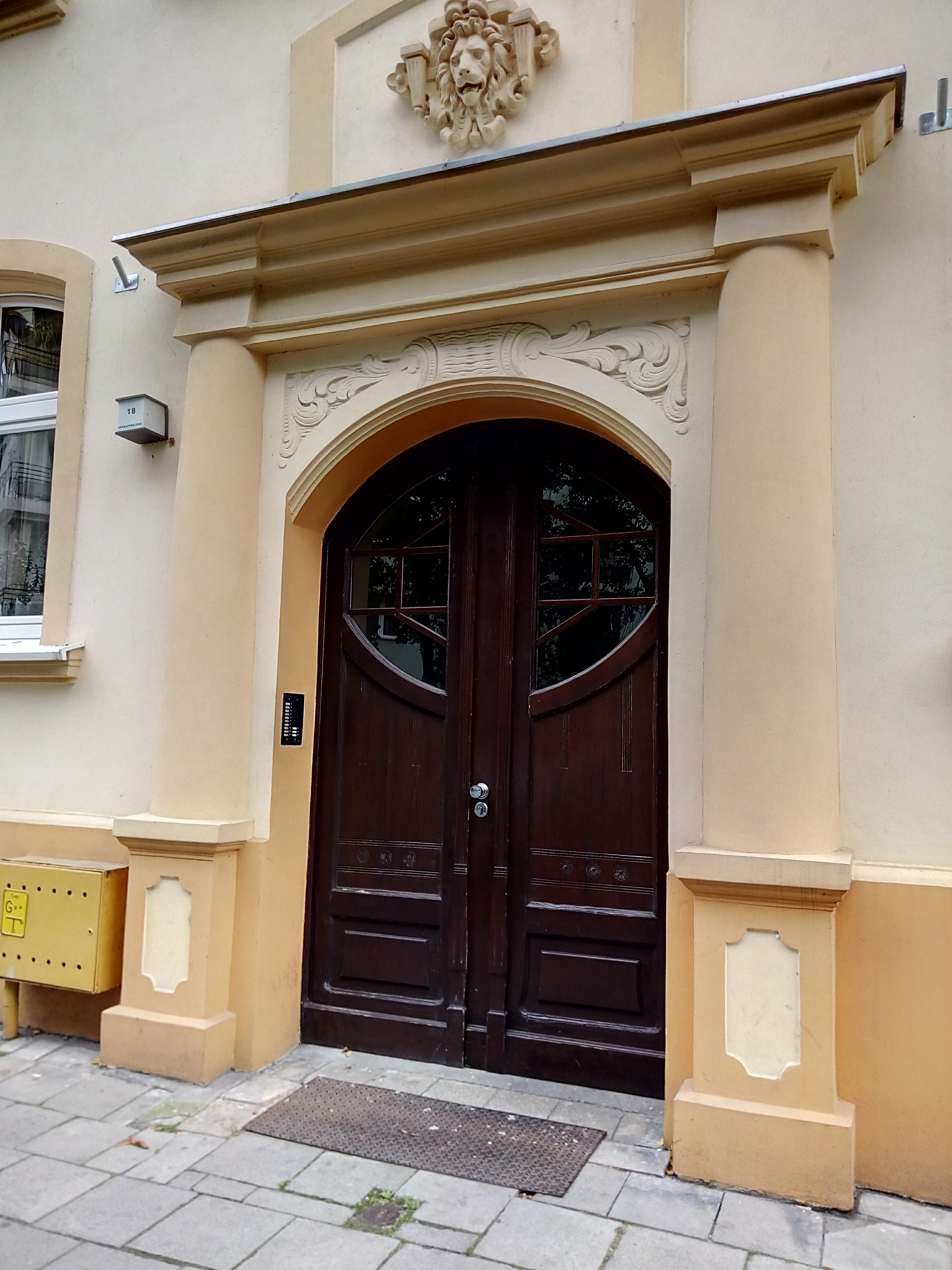
Details of the portal

=== Tenement at 19 ===
1900

Eclecticism

First registered owner was Gustav Wölk, listed as "house proprietor".

The building is need of refurbishment to allow the preservation of its eclectic architectural elements.

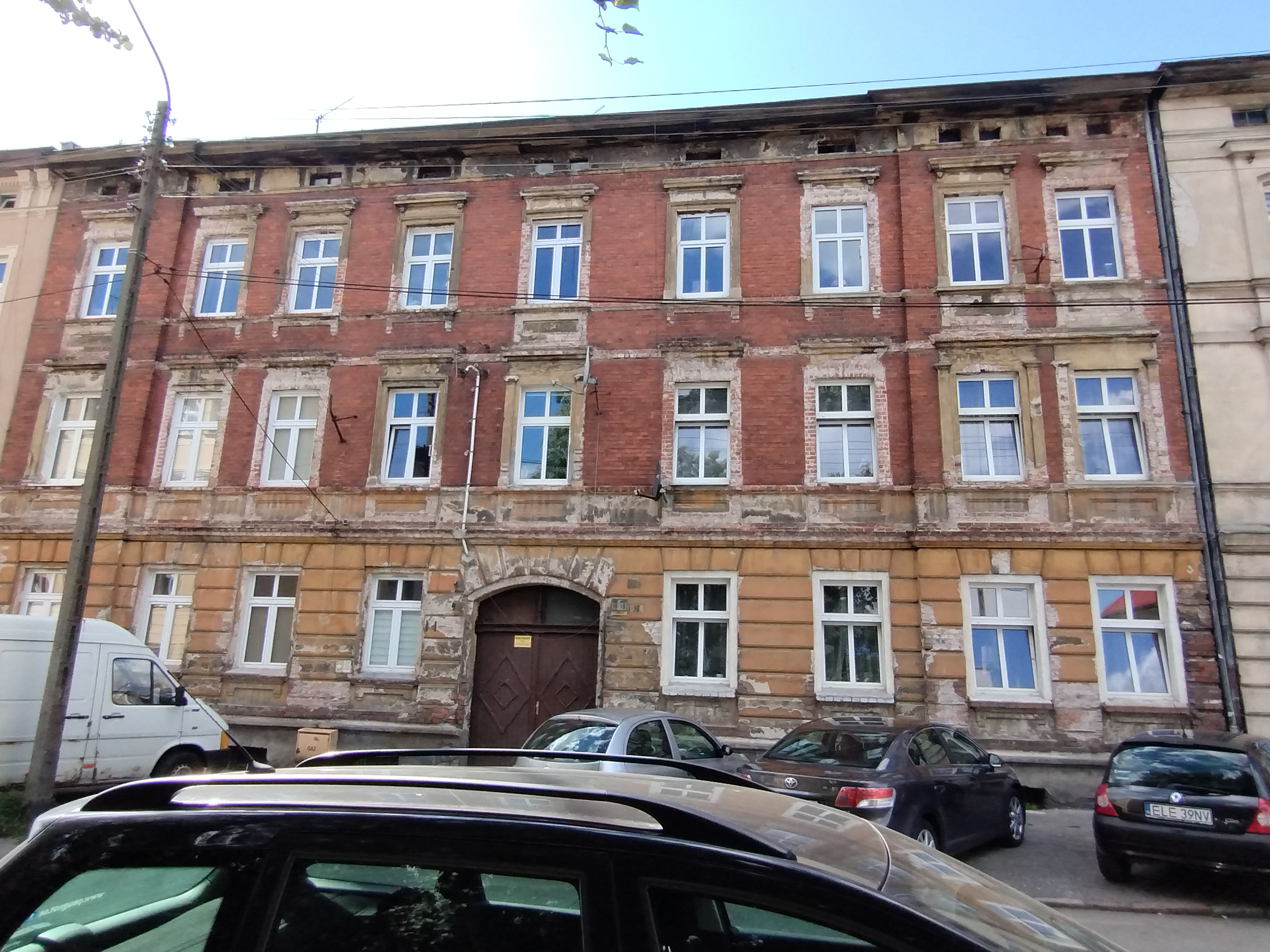
Main frontage

=== Tenement at 20 ===
1906-1907

Art Nouveau

The edifice was ordered by Otto Hoppe, a master baker, living at "23 Albertstraße", today's 18 Gabary street.

Superbly renovated in 2013, the main elevation teems with Art Nouveau motifs: stuccoes, cartouches, decorated window sills and an adorned wall gable.

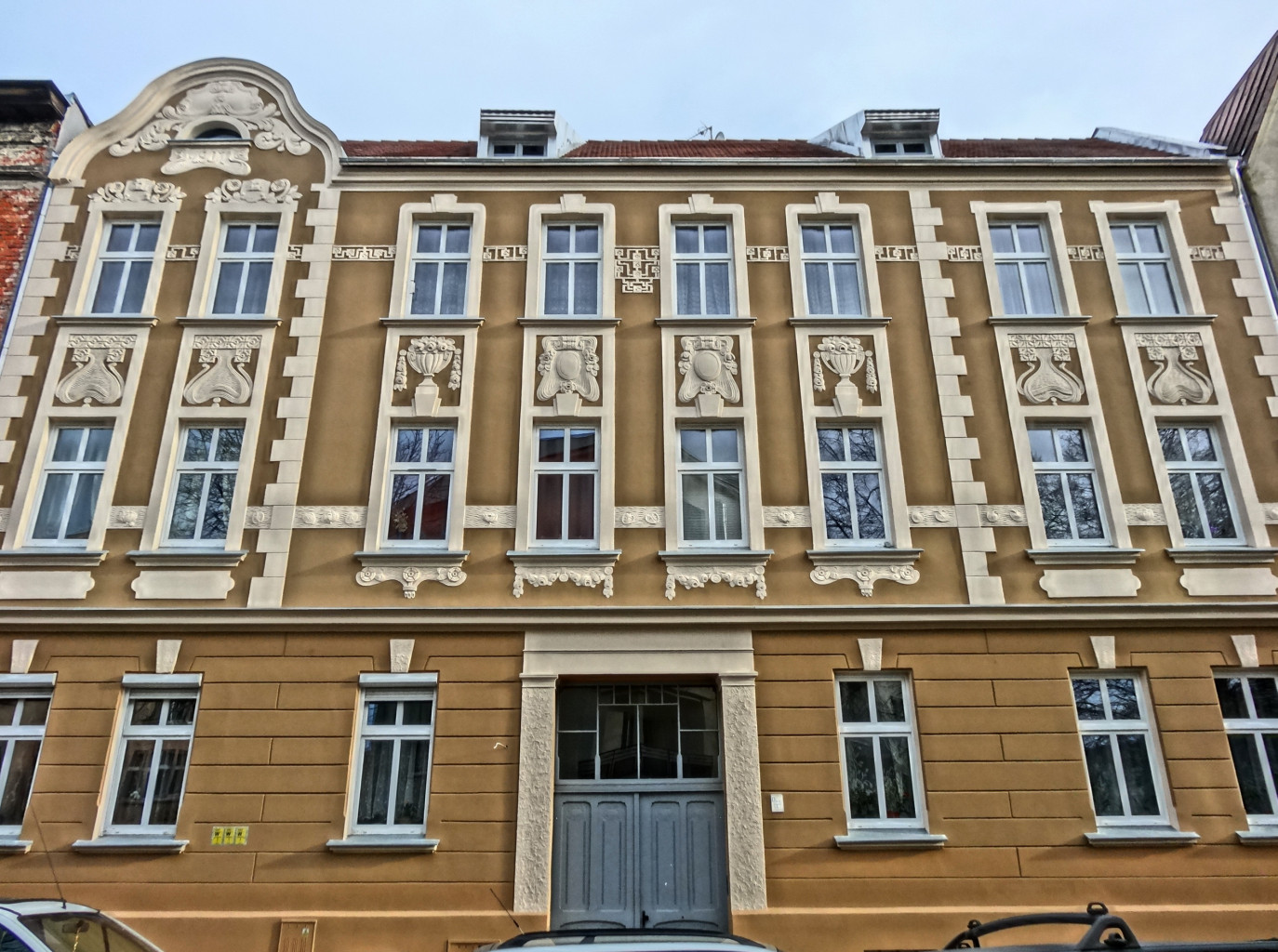
Main frontage

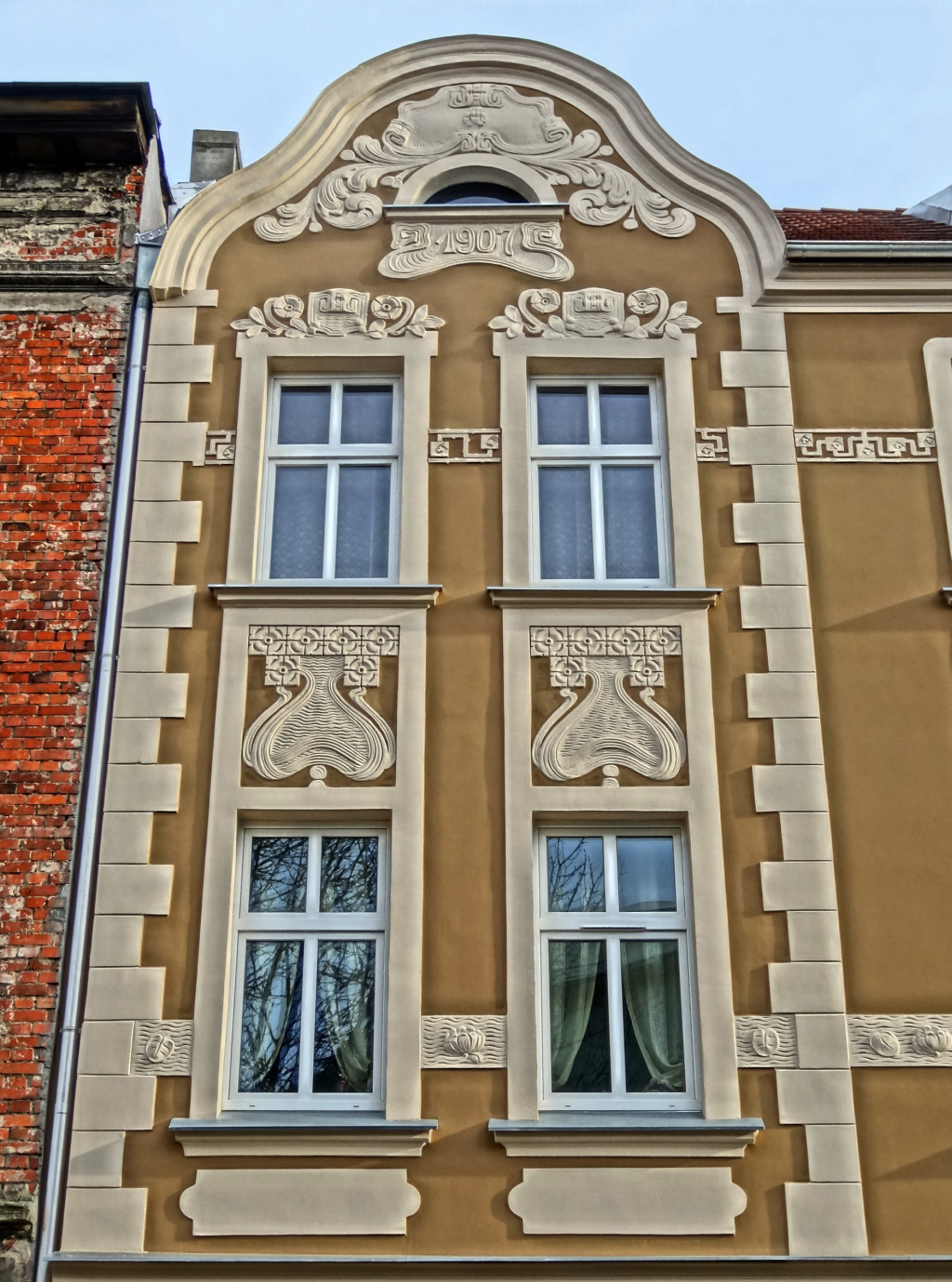
Adornment details

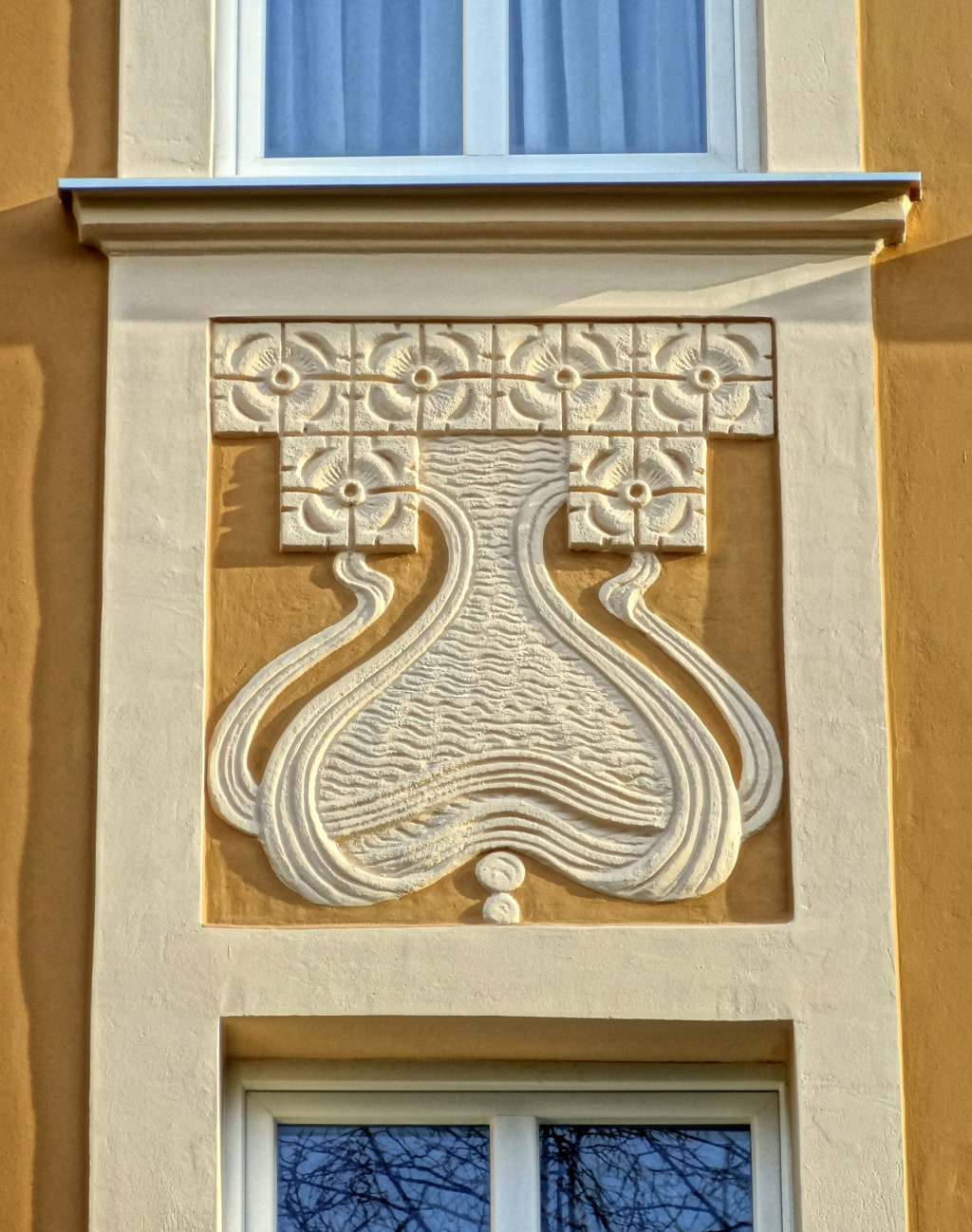
Art nouveau stucco

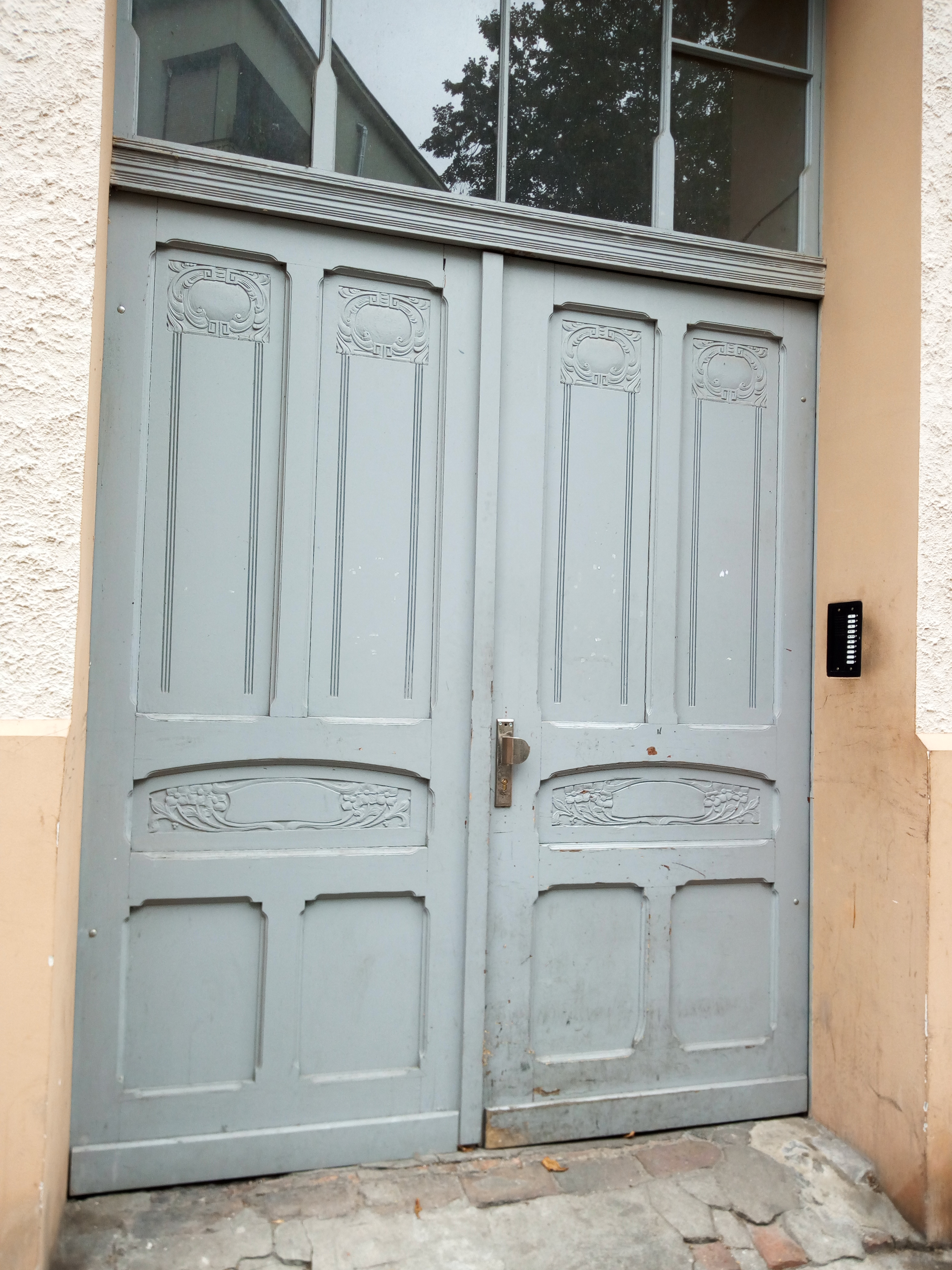
Entrance door

=== Tenement at 21 ===
End of 19th century

Eclecticism

Tenement's first owner was Franz Machalinski, a building contractor.

The facade style mirrors the one at 19, but much well preserved, enabling to notice few architectural details.

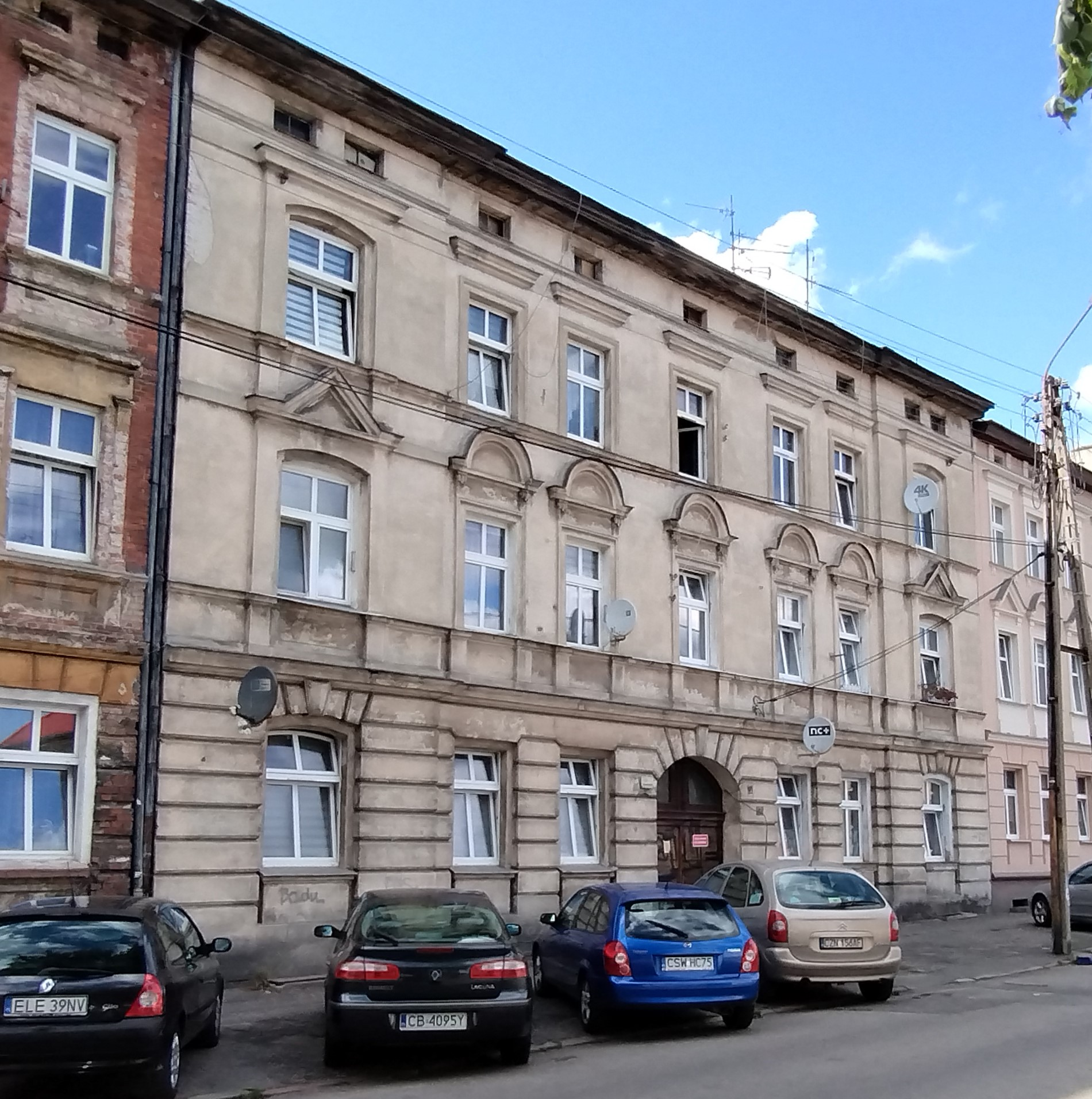
Main frontage

=== Tenement at 29 Garbary street, corner with Jackowskiego street ===
1893

Eclecticism

August Götting, a carpenter and a relative of the owner at 16 Garbary (then "Albertstraße"), was the commissioner of this tenement, which he never inhabited.

Both facades exhibit eclectic features: bossage, openings with pediments and corbel table on top.

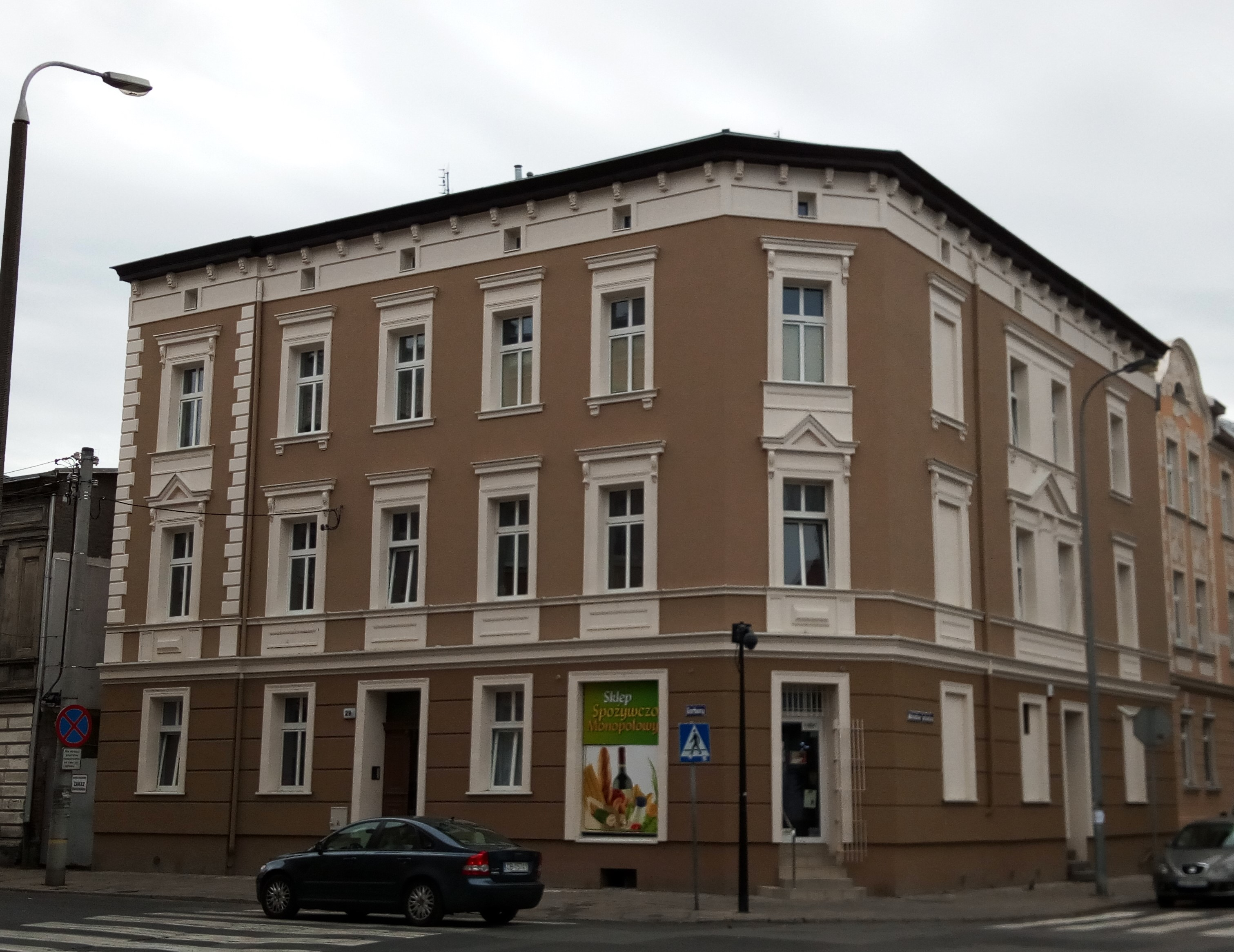
Main view from the street

=== Tenement at 30 Garbary street, corner with Jackowskiego street ===
1906

Eclecticism

Like house at 29, the landlord of this tenement, Mr Junker, a merchant, never lived in his property.

Very similar to Nr.29's elevation, Nr.30 displays a bay window on its corner, together with several additional levels and dormers on the top.

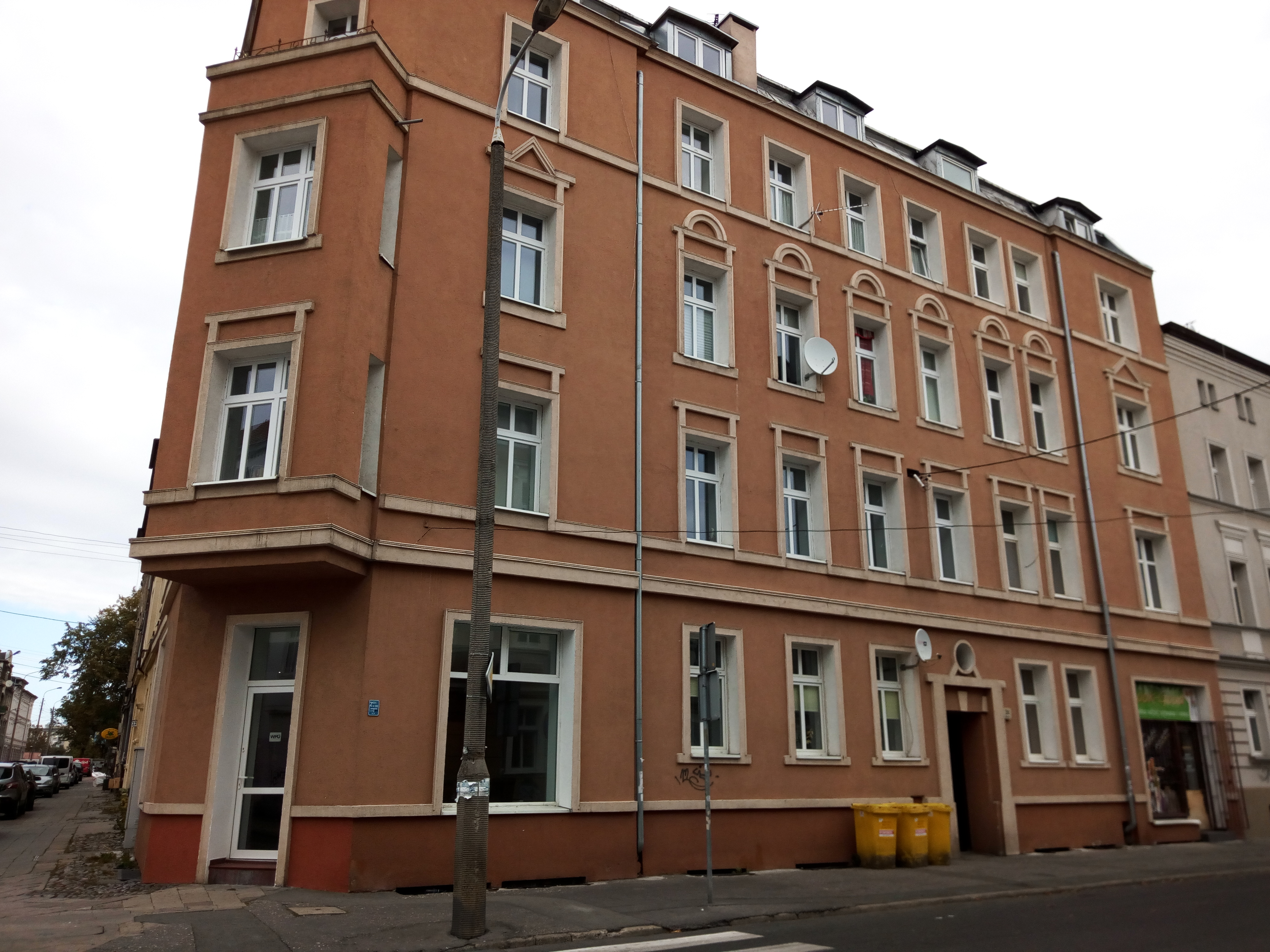
Main view from Garbary street

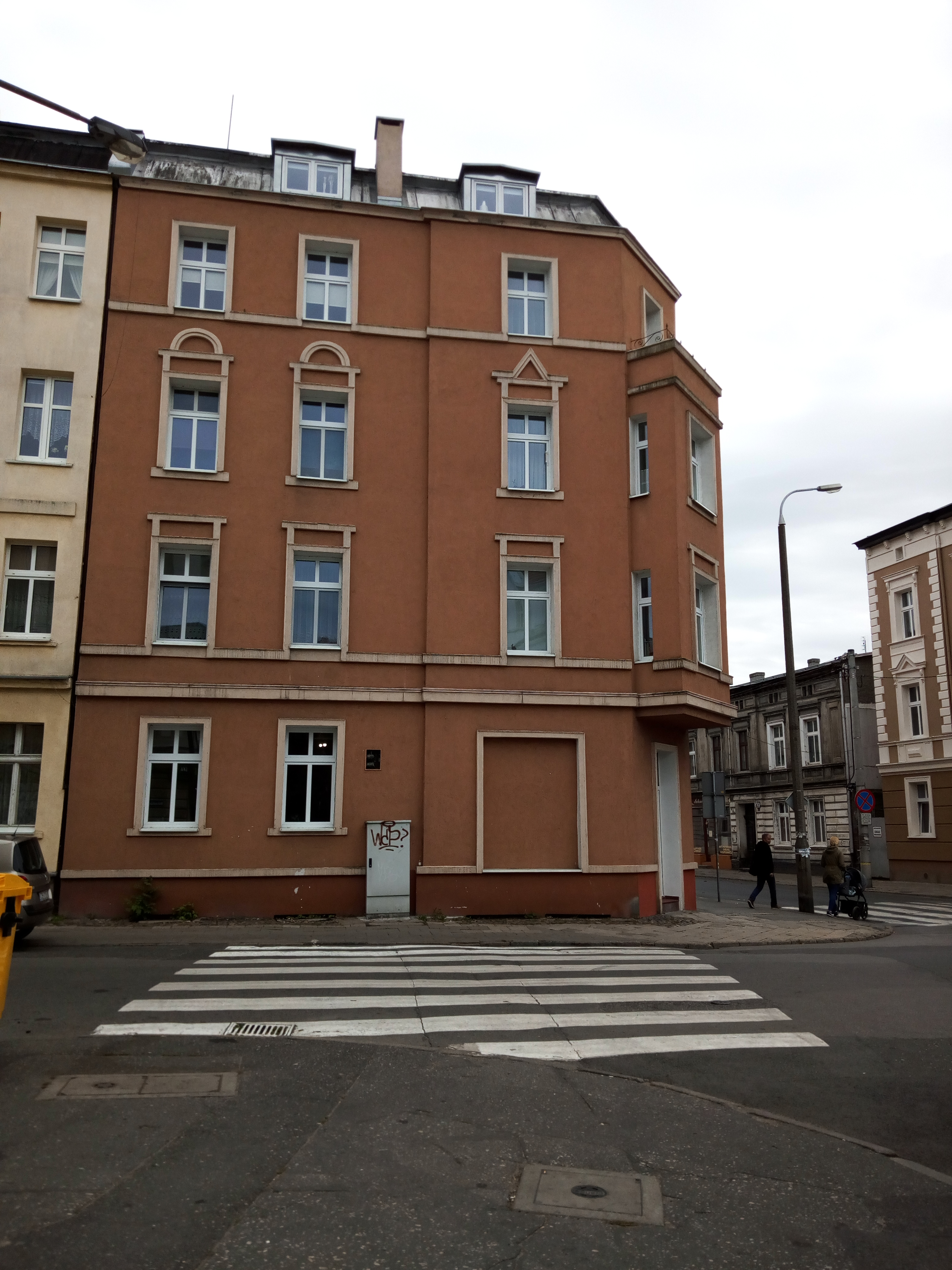
Frontage onto Jackowskiego street

=== Tenement at 22 ===
1904

Art Nouveau

The first landlord was a merchant, Mr Juncker, who did not live there.

The facade has lost all its architectural details, save for the adorned entrance portal.

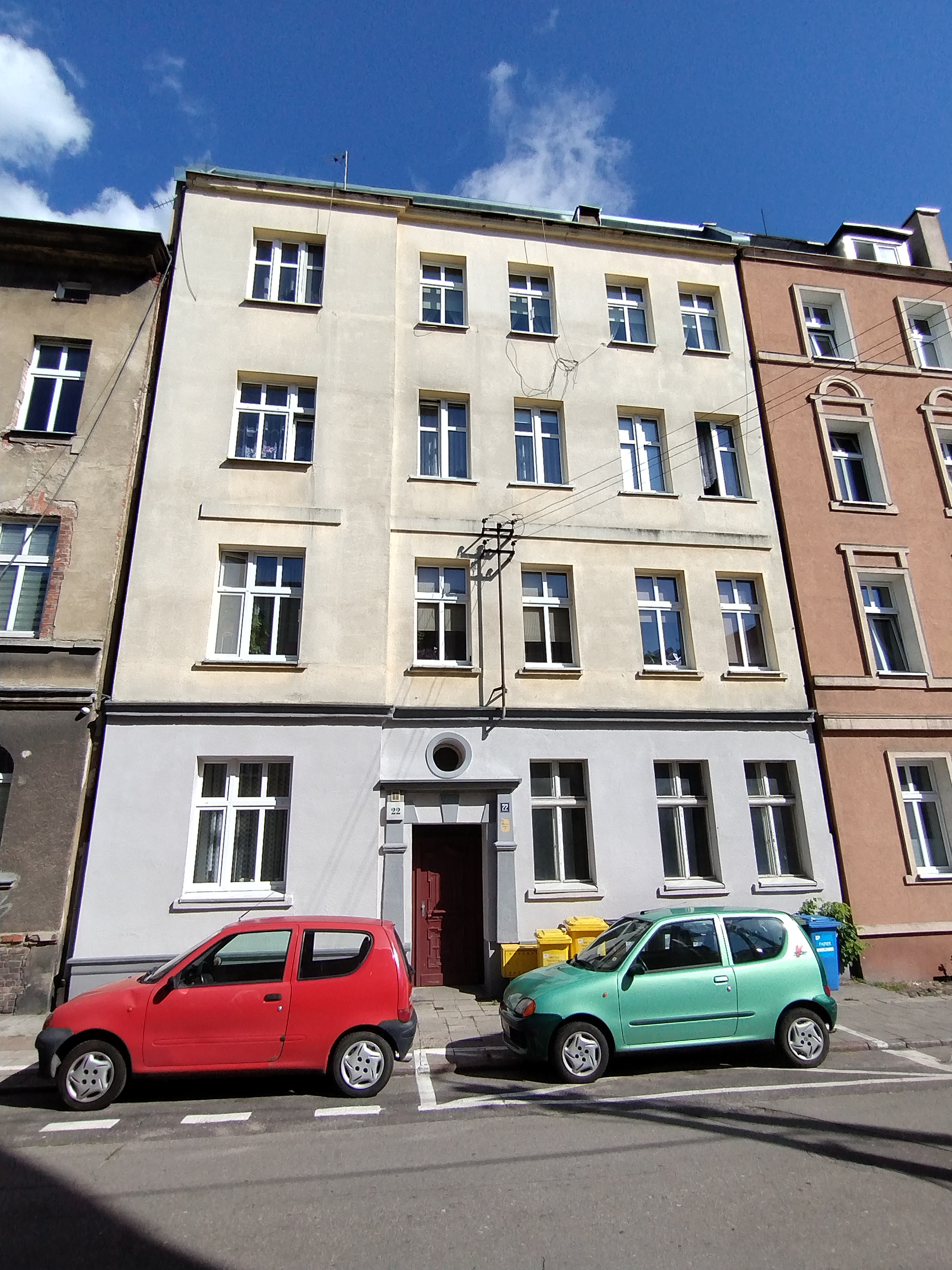
Main frontage

=== Tenement at 23 ===
End of 19th century

Eclecticism

Zimmermann Gozdowski is registered as the first landlord in 1899.

Refurbished in 2016–2017, the main elevation is similar in style to those at 19 and 23.

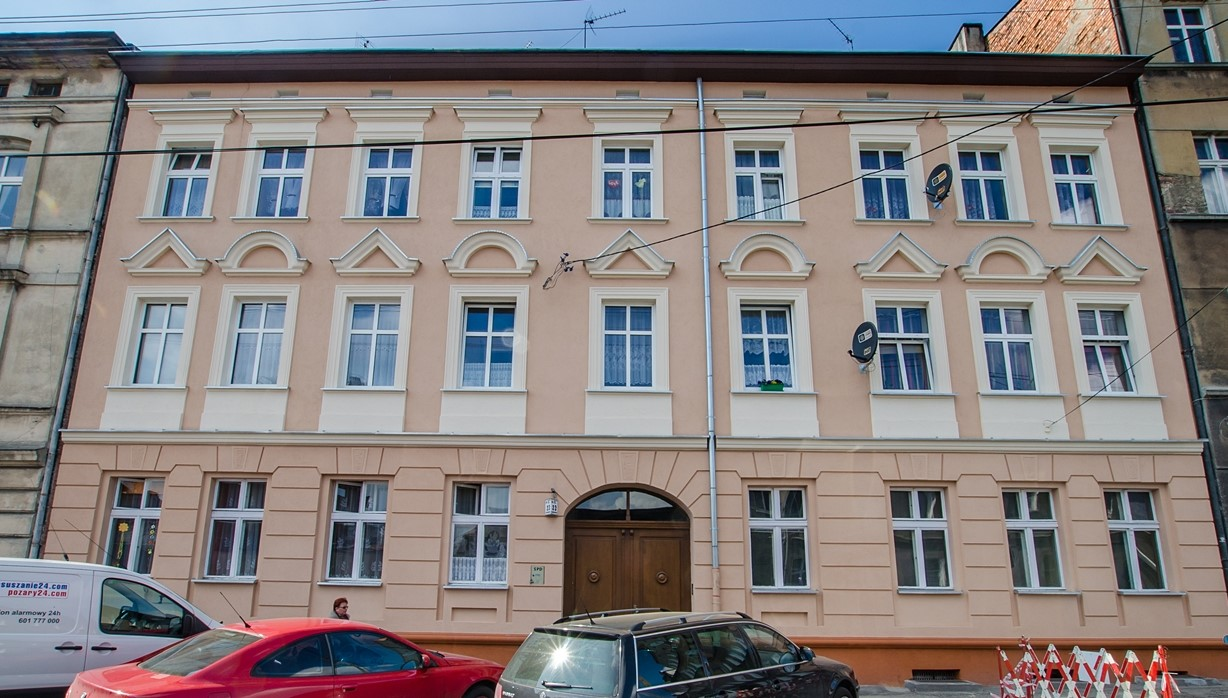
Main elevation on the street

=== Tenement at 24 ===
End of the 19th century

Eclecticism

The first landlord was Friedrich Meyer, a building contractor. He lived at "8 Vorkvertstraße", now Aleksandra Fredy street.

The elevation is bare of original decoration. One can notice the entrance door featuring a fanlight.

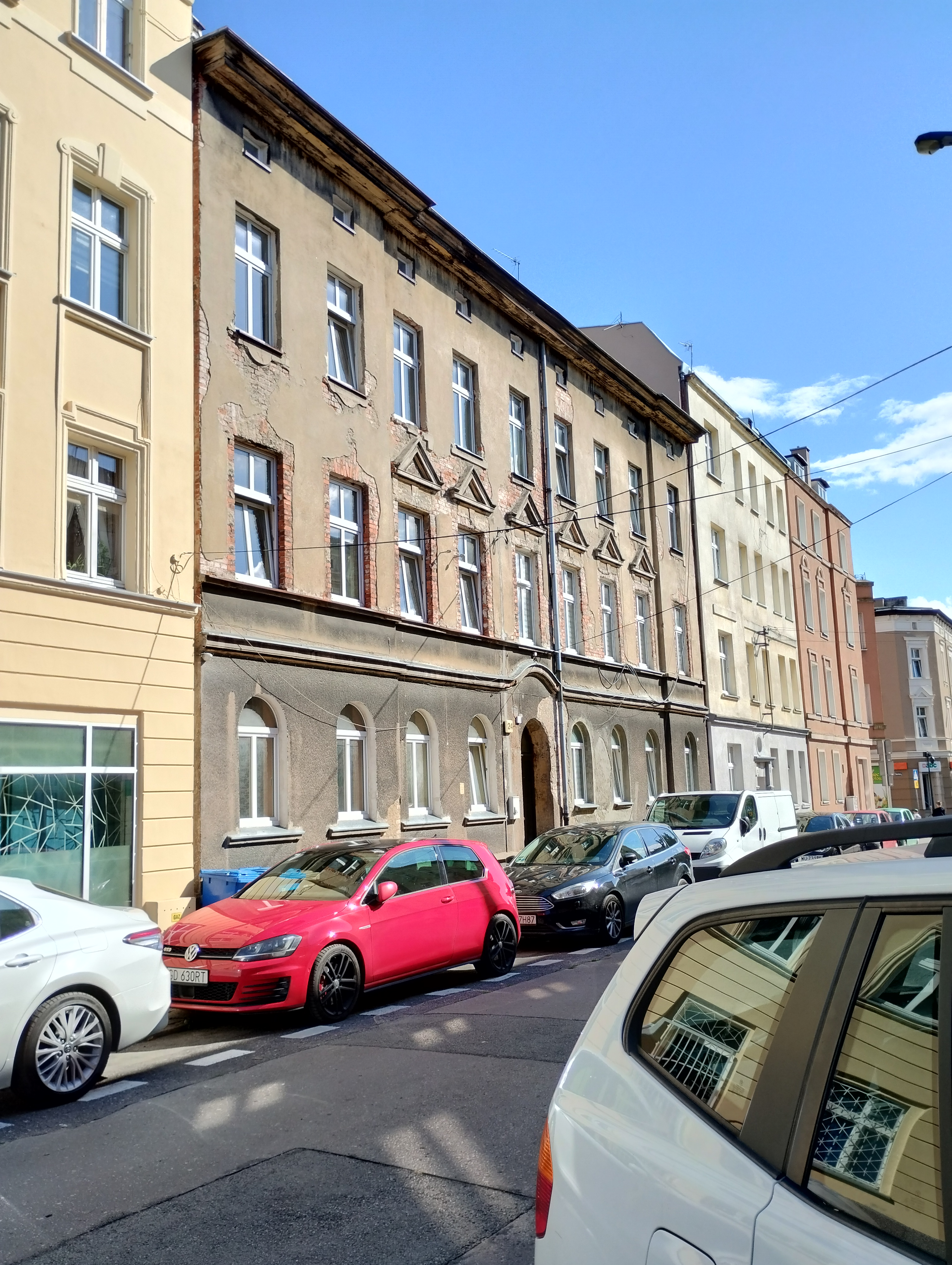
Main elevation

=== Berndt tenement (26) and ancient dairy factories (28/30) ===
1900

Eclecticism, Industrial architecture

Ernst Berndt, first owner of the tenement at 26, had been running a dairy and bakery factory (German: molkerei und dampfbäckerei) in the backyard buildings (today's at 28). The firm named "Schweizerhof" (English: Swiss Manor) had started operating in 1912 and had six selling points in Bromberg. The product panel was diverse, from butter milk, whipped cream and cheese to bread, rolls or croissants. "Schweizerhof" closed in 1920.

The edifice at 30, built shortly after the Second World War, had been used by a dairy cooperative for several decades. Currently no more operating, the complex at 28 and 30 has been purchased by a private investor to be converted into a residential estate.

The buildings at 26 an 28 have been renovated in 2022.

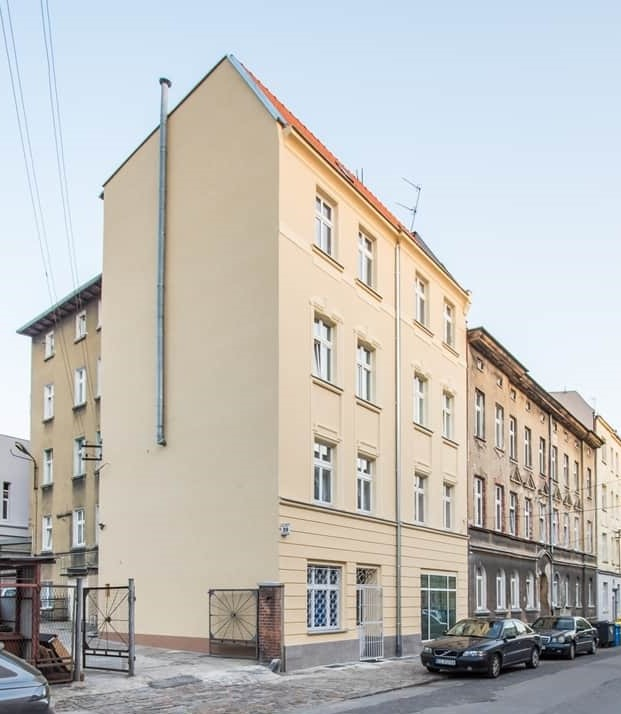
Main elevation at 26

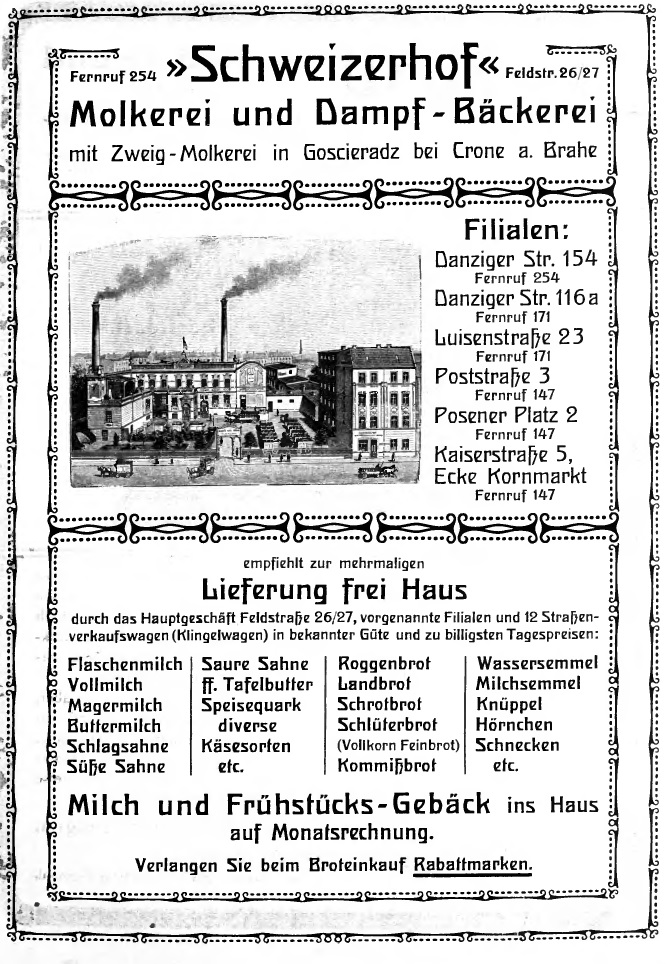
1914 advertising for the dairy factory "Schweizerhof"

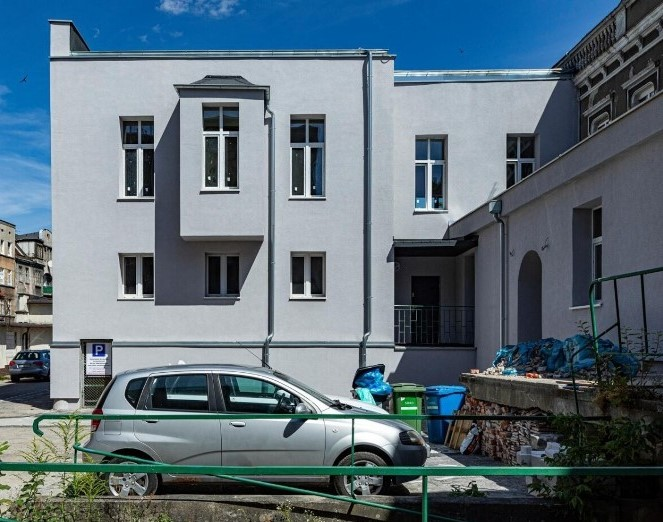
Building at 28

=== Tenement at 27 ===
1910

Art Nouveau

The edifice had for first owner Mr Goltz, a building contractor.

The tenement, albeit damaged, still presents noticeable features: a nice Art Nouveau entrance door topped by an oeil-de-boeuf, two balconies with original wrought iron railings, round top windows and fragments of decoration on window sills and lintels.

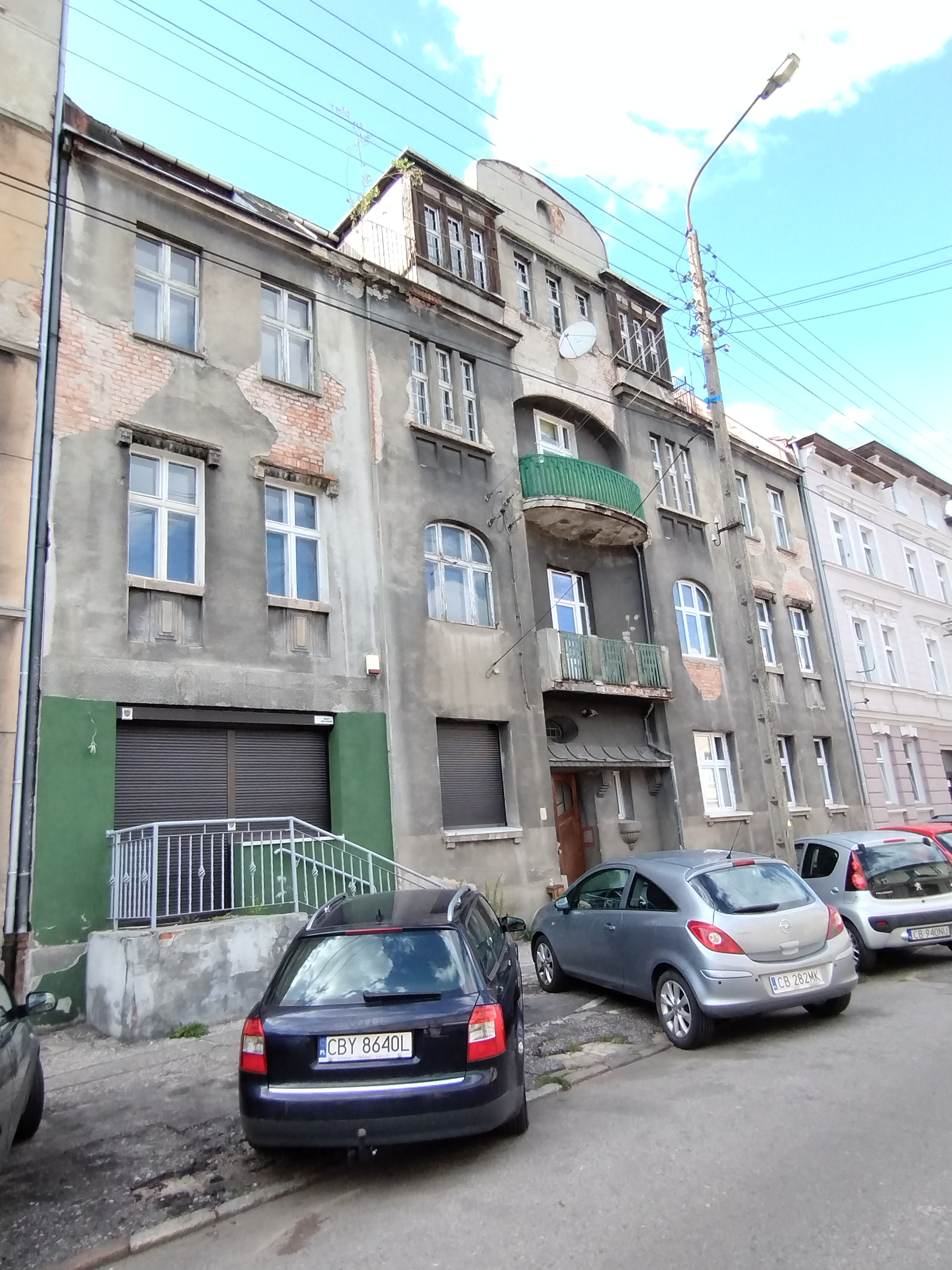
Facade on the street

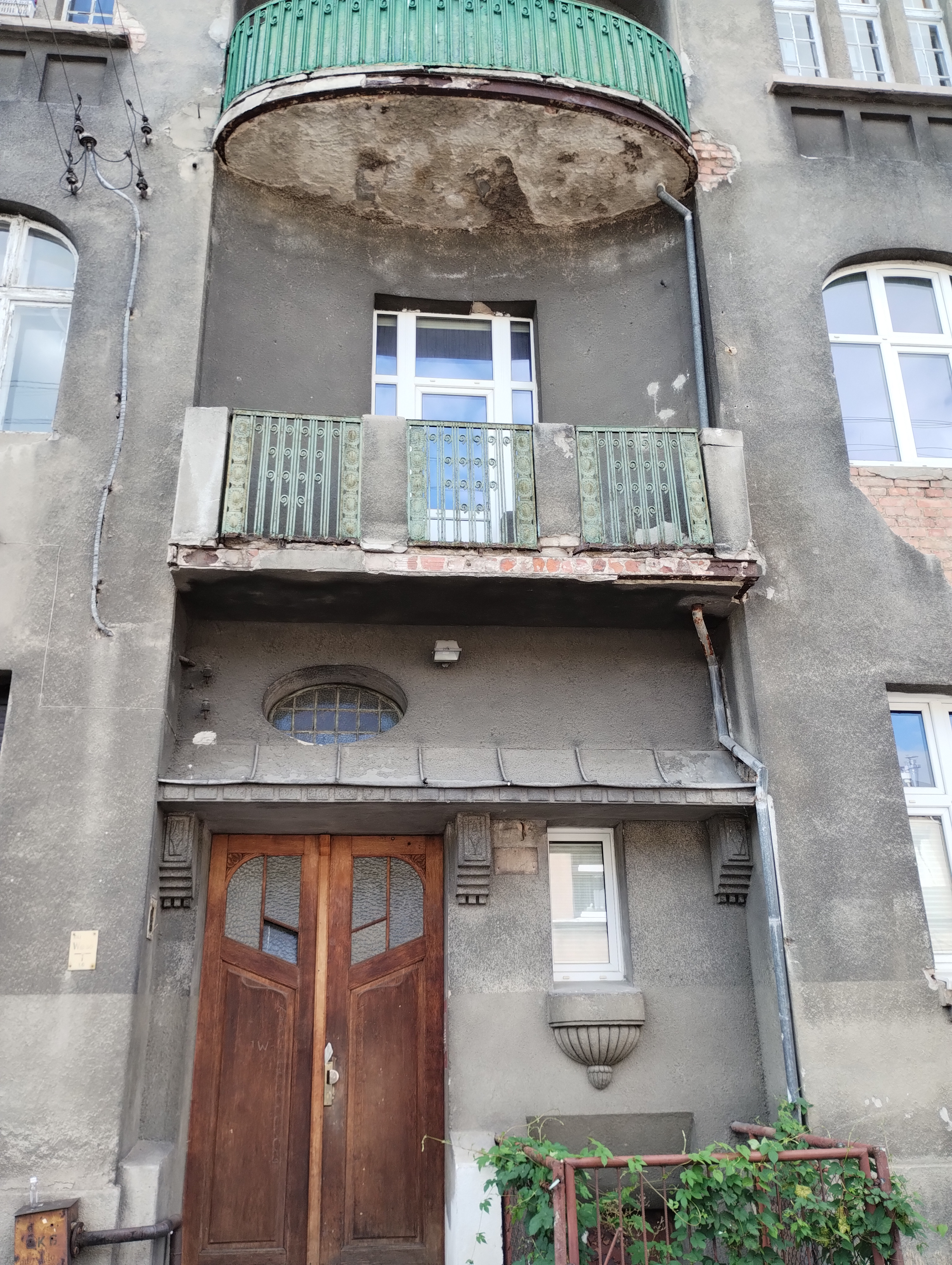
Detail of the entrance and balcony

=== Tenement at 29 Jackowskiego street, corner with Łokietka street ===
1897

Eclecticism

Its first landlord was Ludwig Shick, listed as a worker in 1897.

The building has been recently refurbished and exhibits on both of its frontages platered lintels, some arched pediments, a decorated entrance portal on Łokietka street and a corbel table running on top of the facades.

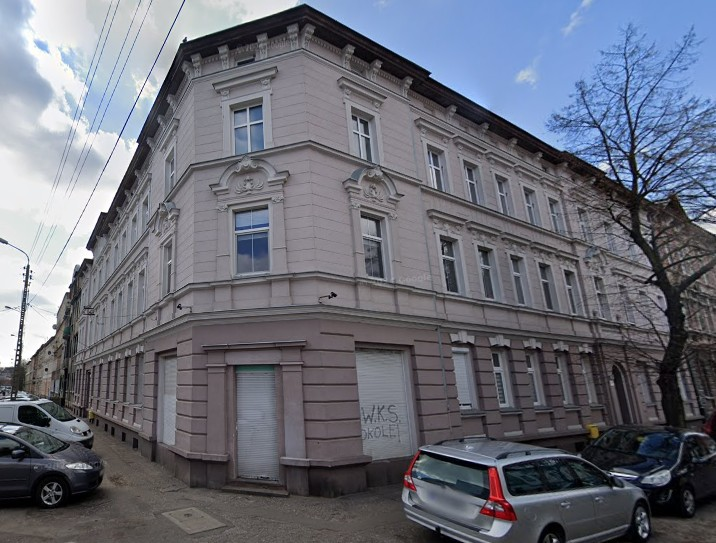
View from the street intersection

=== Houses at 32/36 Jackowskiego street ===
End of the 19th century

These buildings, then at 4 to 6 Feldstraße, have all been originally owned by Martin Buchholz, a relative of Ludwig Buchholz, who ran a successful tannery in present-day Garbary street.

The house at 36 has been renovated in 2023. The main entrance still displays a well-preserved door woodwork and an intriguing irregular-shape step stone.

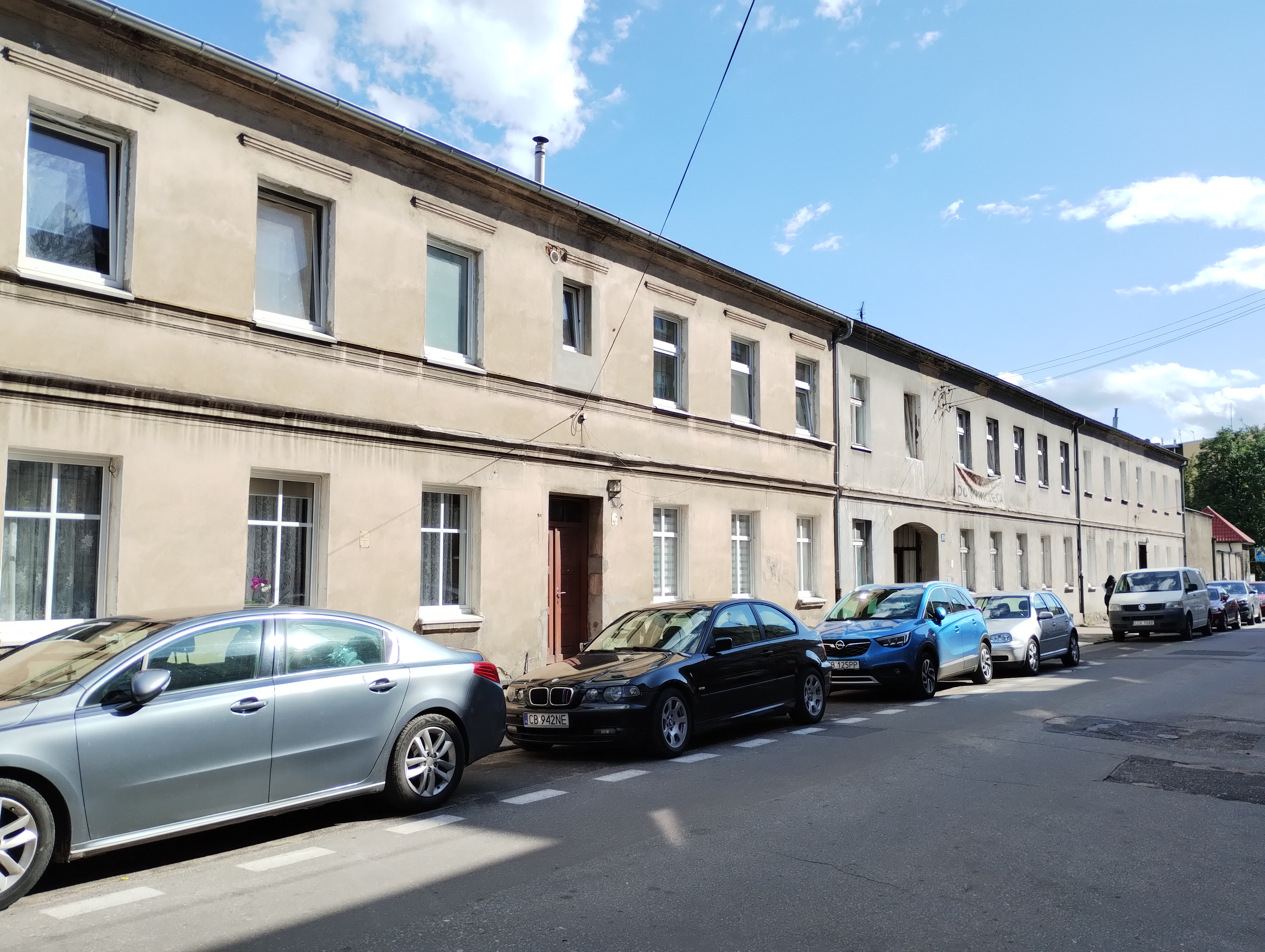
View of houses at 32 and 34

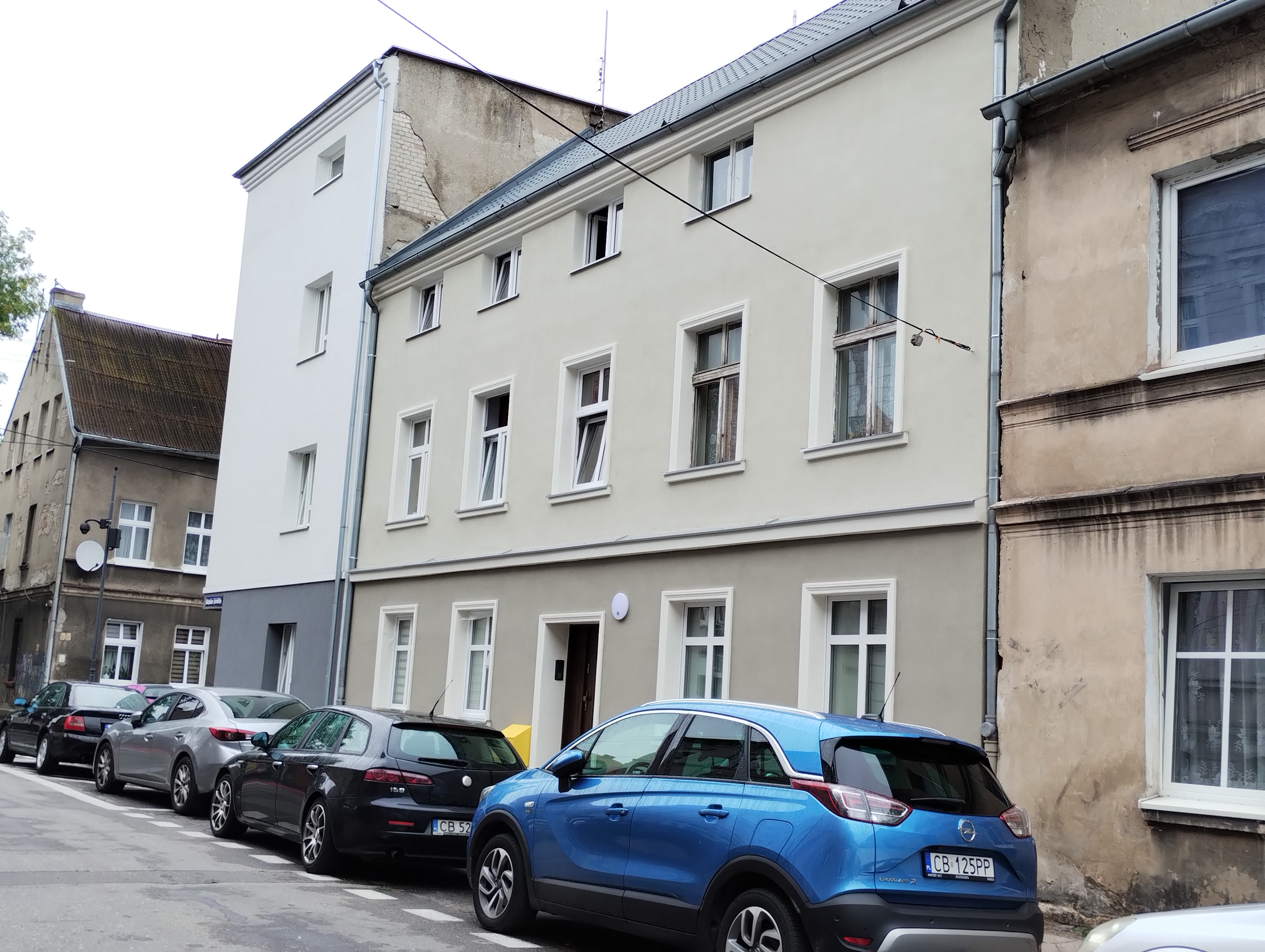
Renovated tenement at 36

=== Tenement at 19A Łokietka street, corner with Jackowskiego street ===
Mid-1930s

Modernism

The tenement has been renovated in 2020.

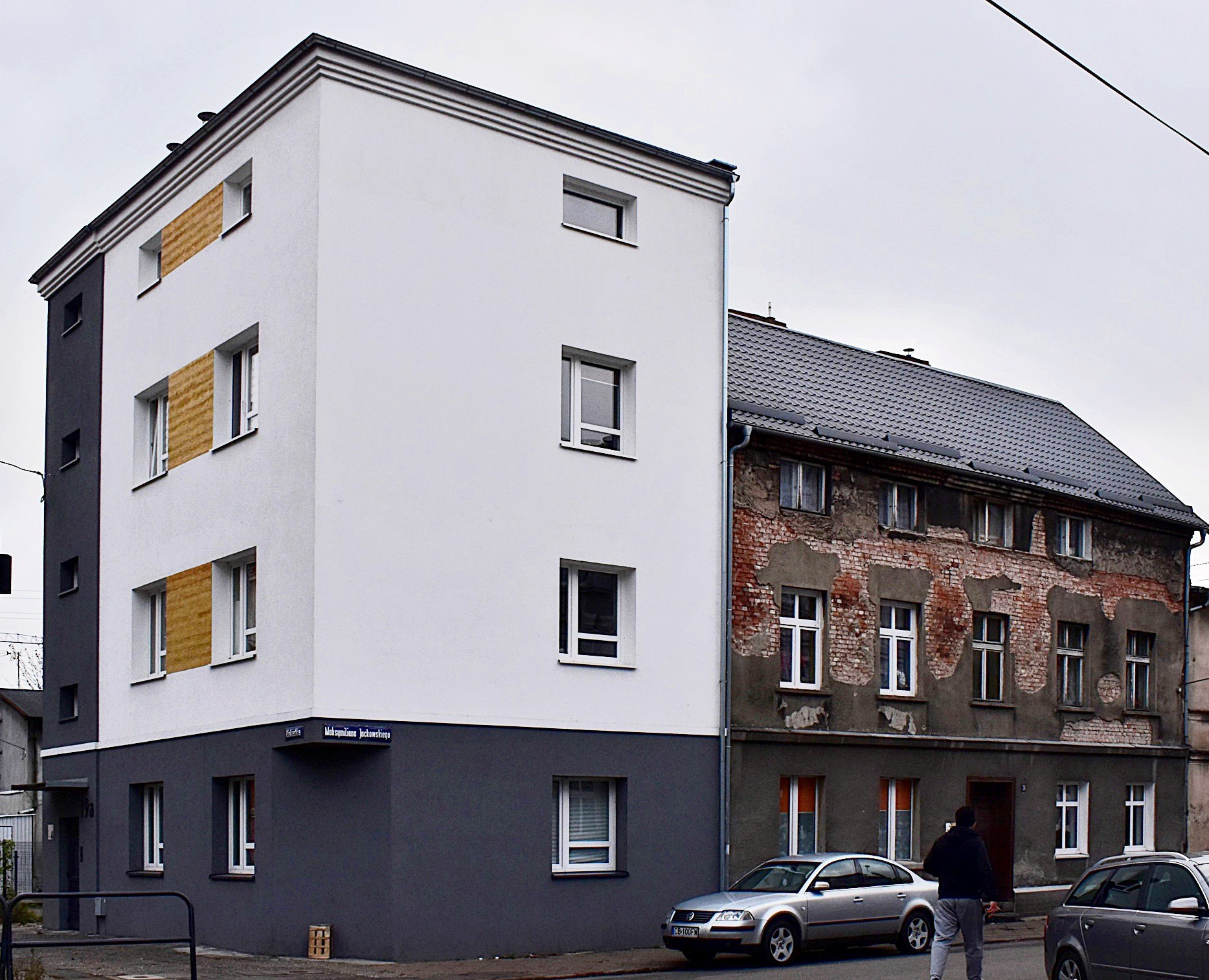
View from the street corner

== See also ==
- Bydgoszcz
- Królowej Jadwigi Street, Bydgoszcz
- Garbary Street
- Maksymilian Jackowski

== Bibliography ==
- Umiński, Janusz (1996). Bydgoszcz. Przewodnik [Bydgoszcz. Guide] (in Polish). Bydgoszcz: Regionalny Oddział PTTK "Szlak Brdy".
