= Babia Wieś Street, Bydgoszcz =

Street, Bydgoszcz, Poland, 19th–20th century

Babia Wieś street
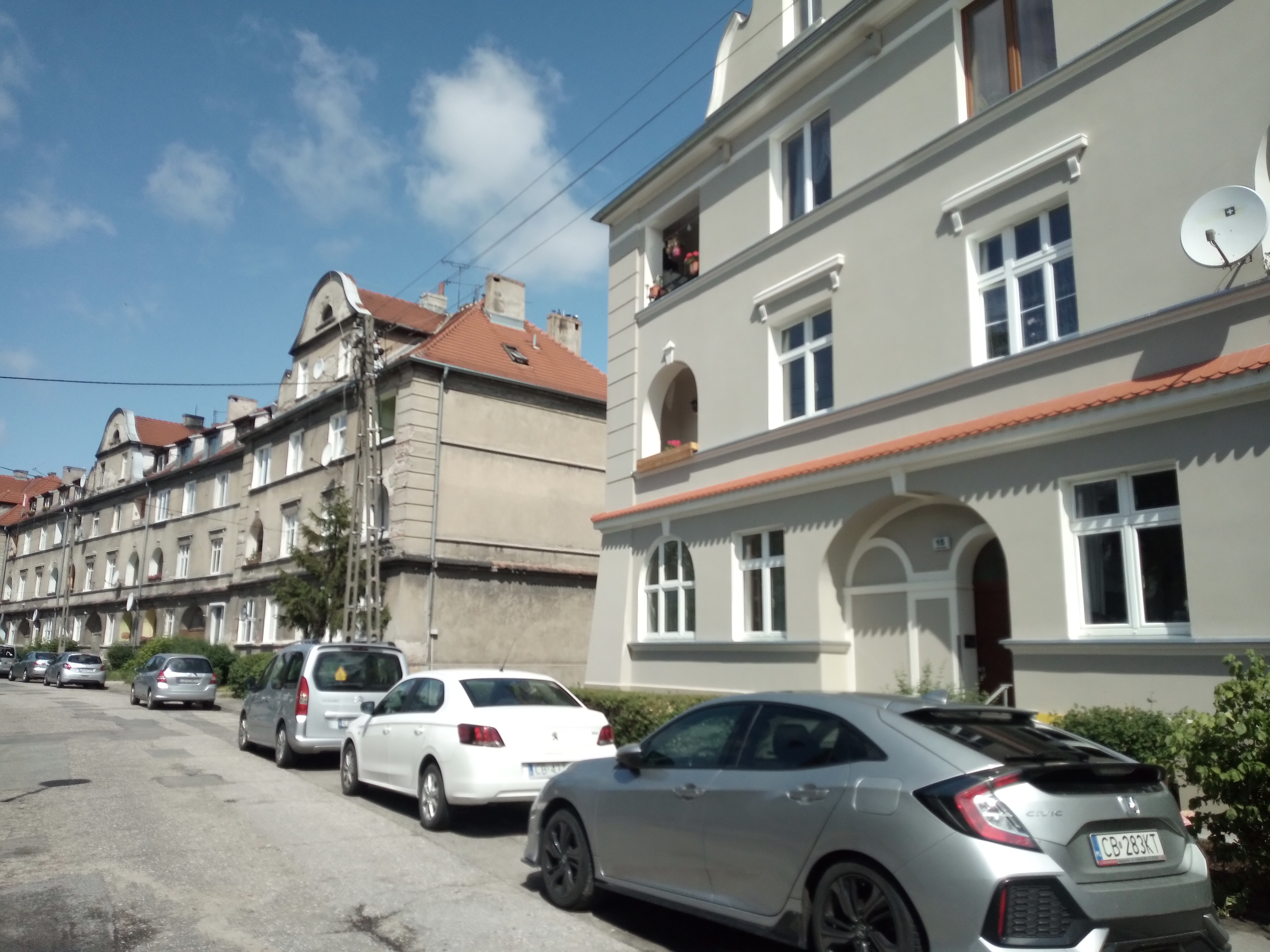
- Street view westward

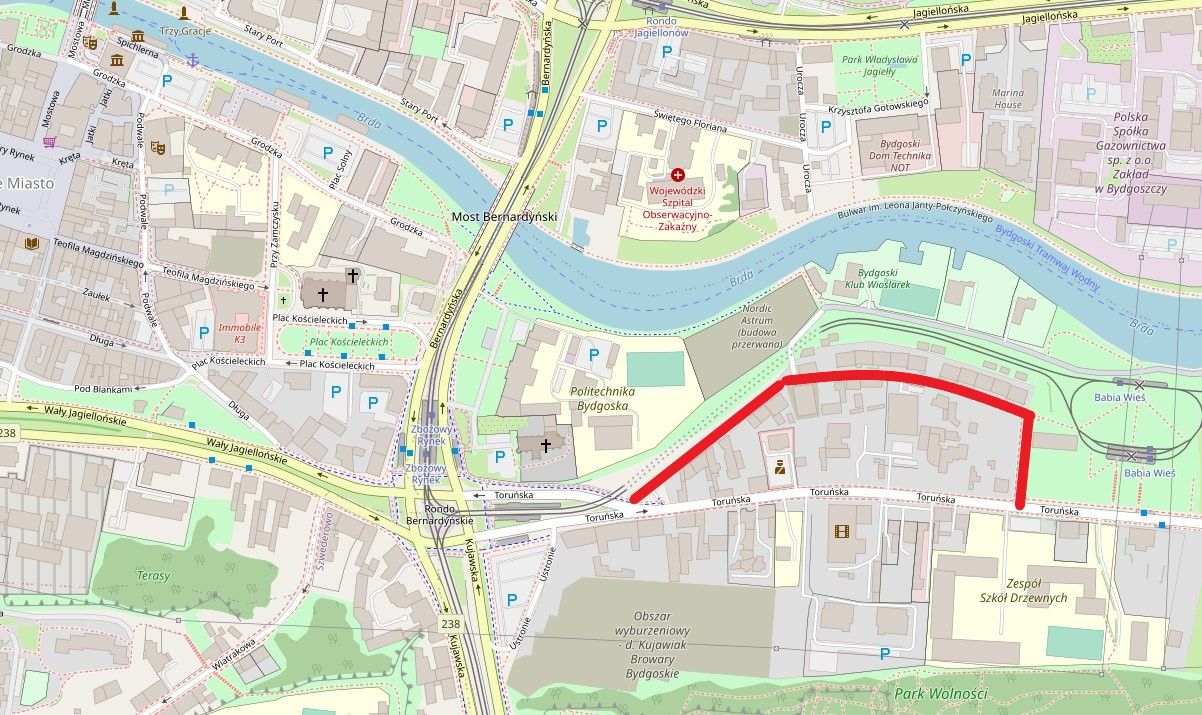
- Babia Wieś street highlighted on a map
- Native name: Ulica Babia Wieś w Bydgoszczy (Polish)
- Former name: Schiffer Straße
- Part of: Babia Wieś district
- Owner: City of Bydgoszcz
- Length: 500 m (1,600 ft)
- Width: c. 10 metres (33 ft)
- Location: Bydgoszcz, Poland
- Coordinates: 53°07′14″N 18°00′40″E

Construction
- Construction start: Early 1800s

Other
- Known for: Brda Riverbank

Babia Wieś Street, in the Babia Wieś district, is a half-kilometre-long alley extending along the Brda River, close to downtown Bydgoszcz in Kuyavian-Pomeranian, Poland. The street runs between Toruńska Street and the Brda River, running parallel to the east–west direction. It has a curved shape, and crosses Toruńska Street at both tips.

The name Babia Wieś refers to the larger district of the same name, harking back to a former settlement where the garden of Bydgoszcz castle was earlier situated. Various tenements were constructed along the street between the late 1890s to the 1930s.

== History ==
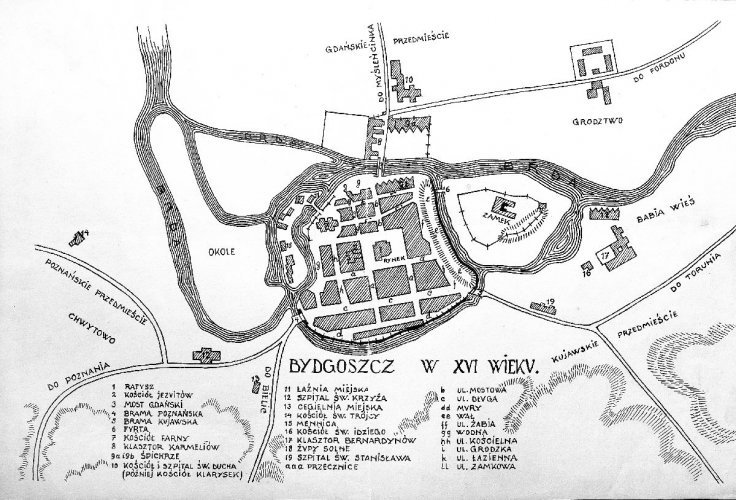
Map of Bydgoszcz, 16th/17th century. The village of Babia Wieś is on the right-hand side.

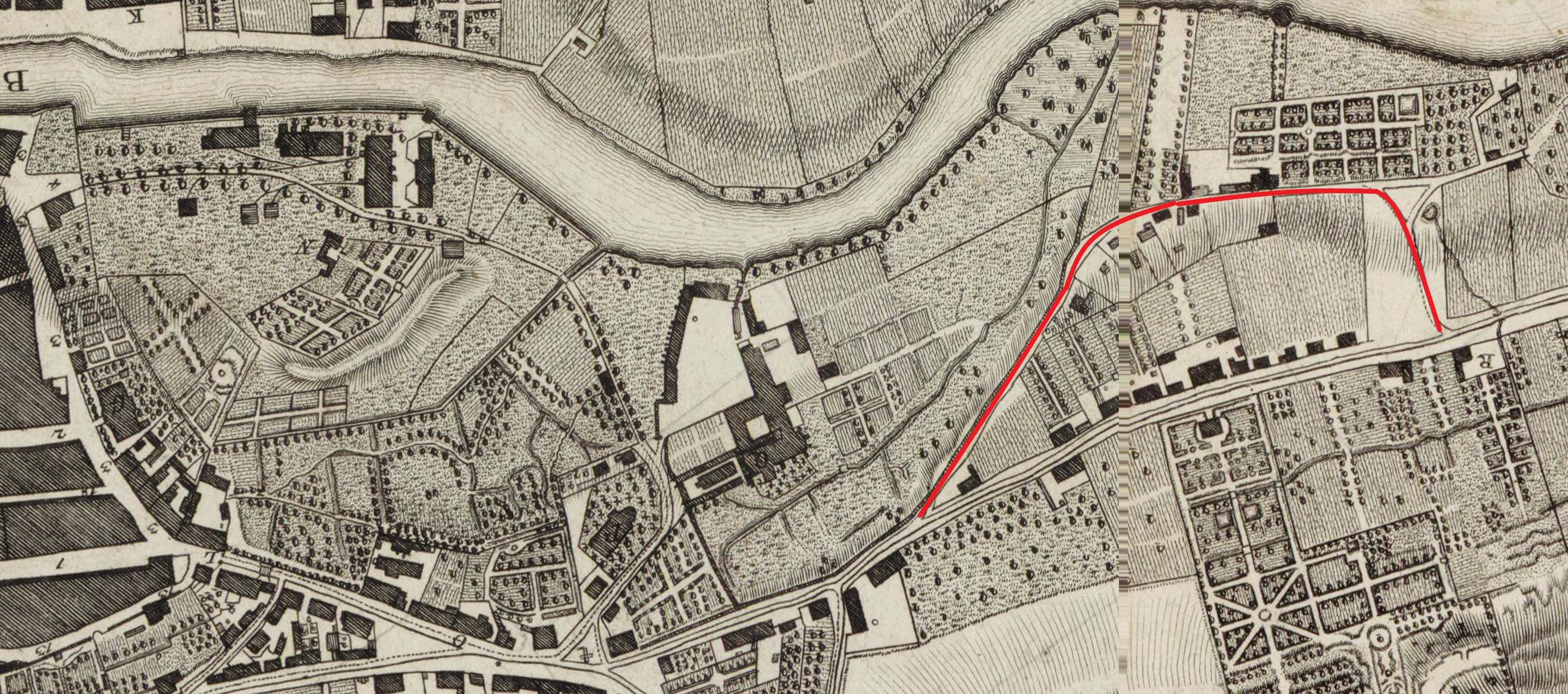
Babia Wieś Street on the Lindner Map, 1800

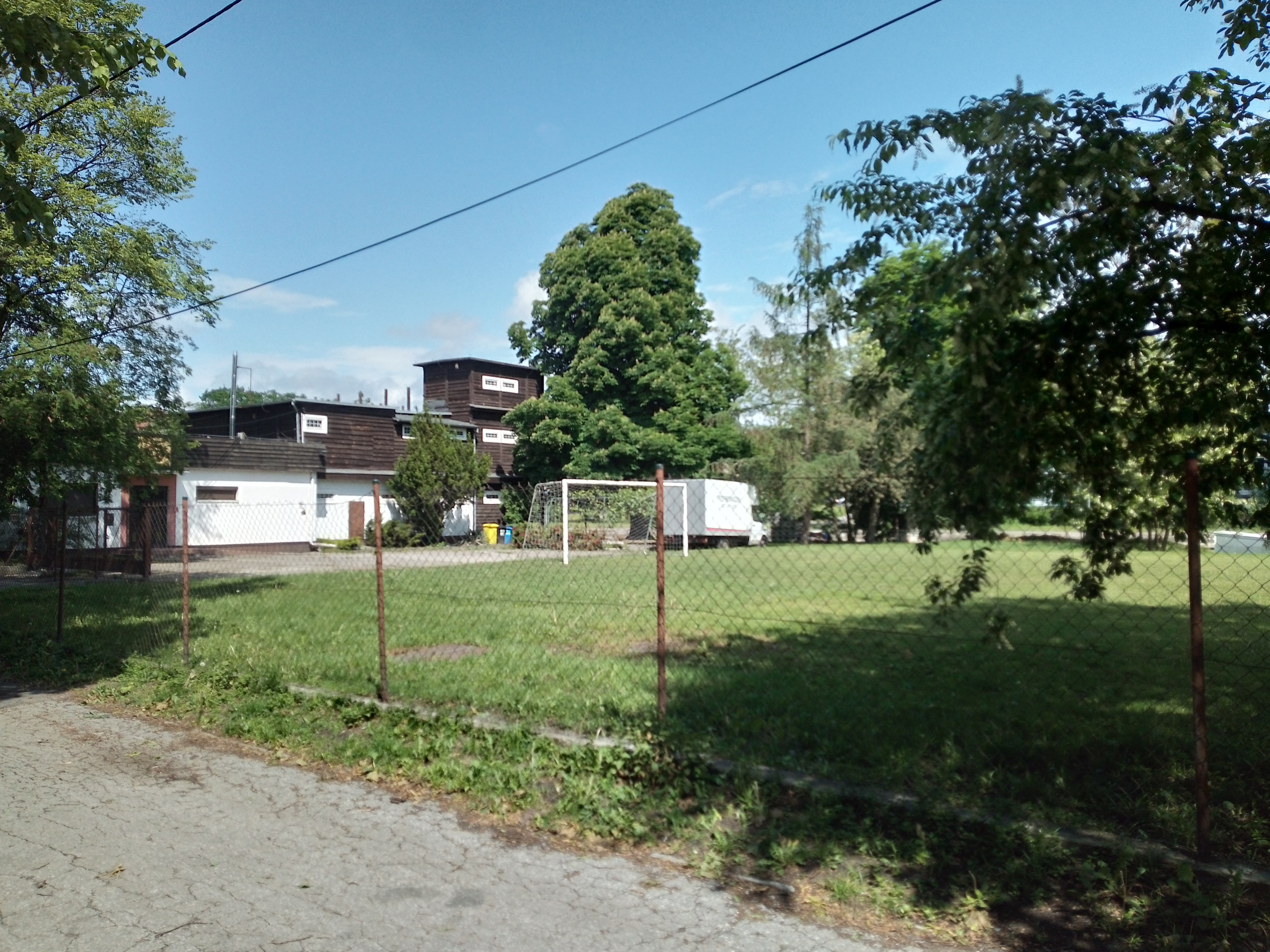
The Kopernik Rowing Club

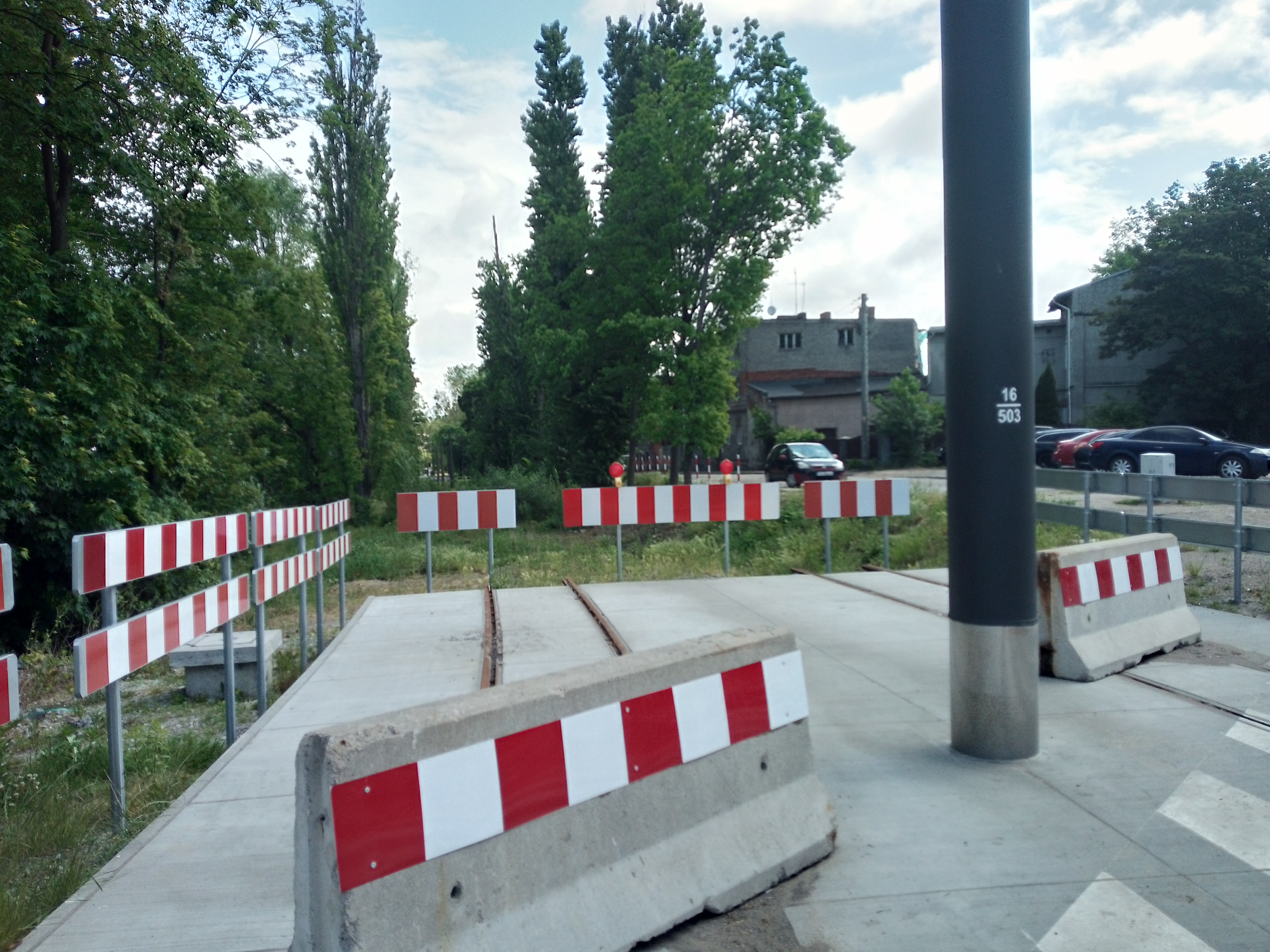
Interrupted tram line

The Babia Wieś settlement dates back to when the city stronghold, dating from the time of the first Piasts, used to stand. The territory had long been exploited for its salt mines.

To the east of the Bydgoszcz castle, a suburban colony was established, close to the Brda River, where fish were caught and along which fertile soil could be ploughed. In the settlement area, a church was erected in the 13th century. Once the castle was completed in the 14th century, craftspeople, their families and the military lived in Babia Wieś. From 1661, written documents certified the area as a suburb of Bydgoszcz, sometimes named "Przedmieście Kujawskie-Toruńskie" (English: Toruń-Kujawska suburb).

In 1480, the Bernardine Monastery was erected to the east of the castle. A wall-fenced garden was arranged east of this monastery, surrounded by a dyke, which was supported by drainage ditches to protect it against flooding. A manor inn and two houses were built there in 1744. During the Prussian period (1772–1918) and the WWII occupation of Poland, the street bore the name of Schiffer Straße.

Up until the 19th century, very few buildings stood in the street. A map from 1800 reveals only farm estates and some backyards from several-story residential houses along the street. At the beginning of the 20th century, a dozen marinas were created along the right bank of the river Brda; several rowing clubs are still active in the area today, including Bydgoski Klub Wioślarek, Bydgoskie Towarzystwo Wioślarskie and Bydgostia Bydgoszcz. This part of the city between Toruńska Street and the Brda River is nicknamed the "Rowing district" (Polish: Dzielnica wioślarzy).

After World War II, from 1952 to 1953, a new tram line was opened, connecting the Old Town with the Kapuściska and Łęgnowo districts. Its tracks ran between Babia Wieś Street and the river, and a terminus was built east of the street.

Traffic has been stopped since the fall of 2017, following the impact of construction of a 15-storey facility on the river bank by Nordic Astrum. During the first building works, the street ground was displaced, resulting in a small landslide that fissured the house at 8 Babia Wieś Street, damaging the road surface, unsealing a gas pipeline and weakening the foundations of the tram track. The repair of the 130 metres (430 ft) of missing tracks, necessary for a re-opening, is not foreseen before the end of 2023.

== Main areas and edifices ==
=== House at 1a ===
This house was used from 1973 to 2016 for the activities of the Underwater Archeology Club Tryton (Polish: Klub Archeologii Podwodnej "Tryton").

The club gathered divers and archaeologists interested in underwater archaeological research. It cooperated with Andrzej Kola and Gerard Wilke from the Nicolaus Copernicus University in Toruń, Professor Zbigniew Bukowski from the Institute of the History of Material Culture (Polish: Instytut Historii Kultury Materialne) of the Polish Academy of Sciences and Olga Romanowska-Grabowska, a researcher from the office of the Provincial Conservator of Monuments (Polish: Biuro Konserwatora Zabytków).

The peak of his activity took place in the 1970s and the beginning of the 1980s. The club uncovered, among other things:

- a dugout canoe in the lake of Wielkie Gacno;
- a 4-meter-long boat from Lake Ostrowite near Chojnice;
- wooden structures from an early medieval settlement in Lake Łąkorek;
- a wooden palisade, the remains of a wooden bridge as well as Roman stone blocks in a lake near Mogilno;
- a medieval keep
- remains of an early medieval stronghold and Lusatian culture artefacts in Lake Wolskie;
- limestone kilns and wooden platforms in the Gąsawka River.

The club also participated in the research of the Solena wreck conducted by the Central Maritime Museum in Gdańsk. At the end of the 1980s, club divings ceased, and in the 1990s and the 2000s, the club's activity was almost non-existent. Despite some interest in reinvigorating the association in 2010, it dissolved in 2016.

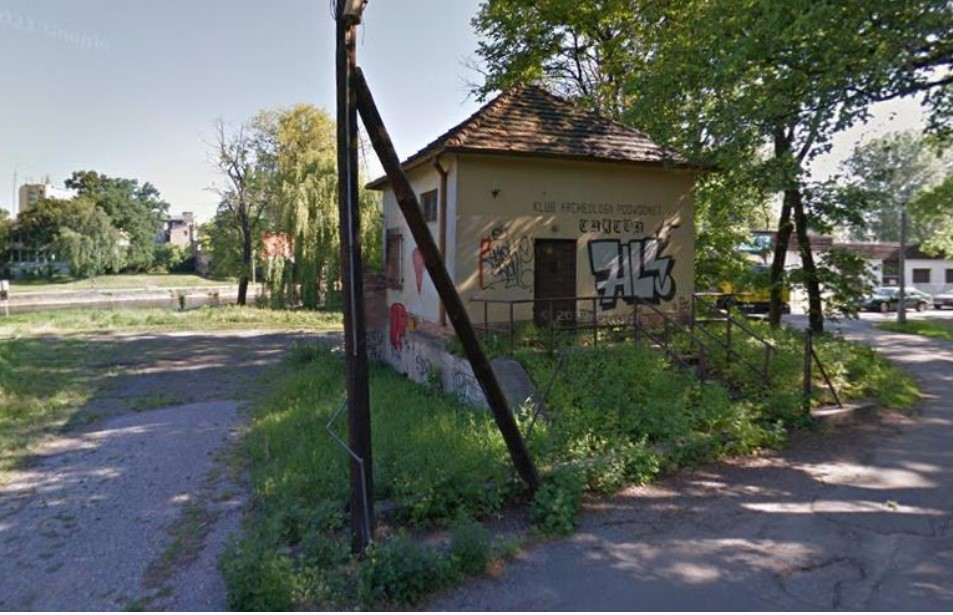
Underwater archaeology club "Tryton"

=== Boathouses ===
The boathouses along the bank of the Brda River were constructed from 1933 to 1937. One building is registered on the Kuyavian-Pomeranian Voivodeship heritage list. In early 1910, several rowing clubs were established in what was then Bromberg, along the right bank of the Brda River. Amongst them, the following ones are still active:

- Bydgoszcz Rowing Club (Polish: Bydgoski Klub Wioślarek (BKW)) was founded on January 25, 1926. It is a women-only rowing club. Until 1920, the club used a riverside dwelling belonging to the State Agricultural School at 6/8 Bernardyńska Street. In 1934, the club received the current plot along the river on a perpetual lease, erecting a rowing marina in 1936. As of 2011, it is still in operation.
- Uczniowski Klub Sportowy (UKS) Kopernik Bydgoszcz (English: Student Sports Club) is a canoeing club established in 1994. It uses the facilities at 5 Babia Wieś Street. The initial patronage of the club was carried out by the "Łączność" multi-sports club, which operated from 1933 to 2006.
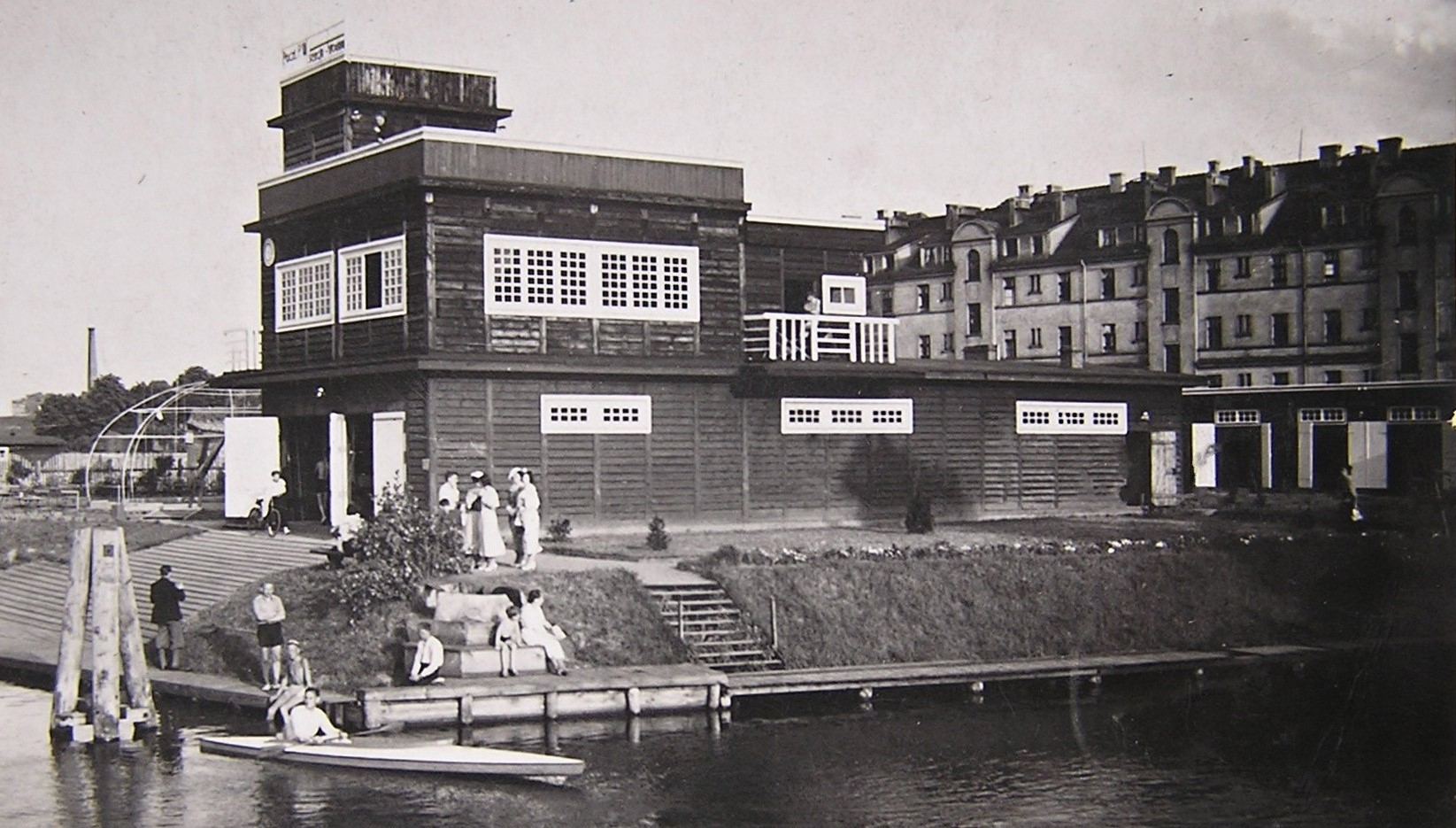
View of one boathouse c. 1936

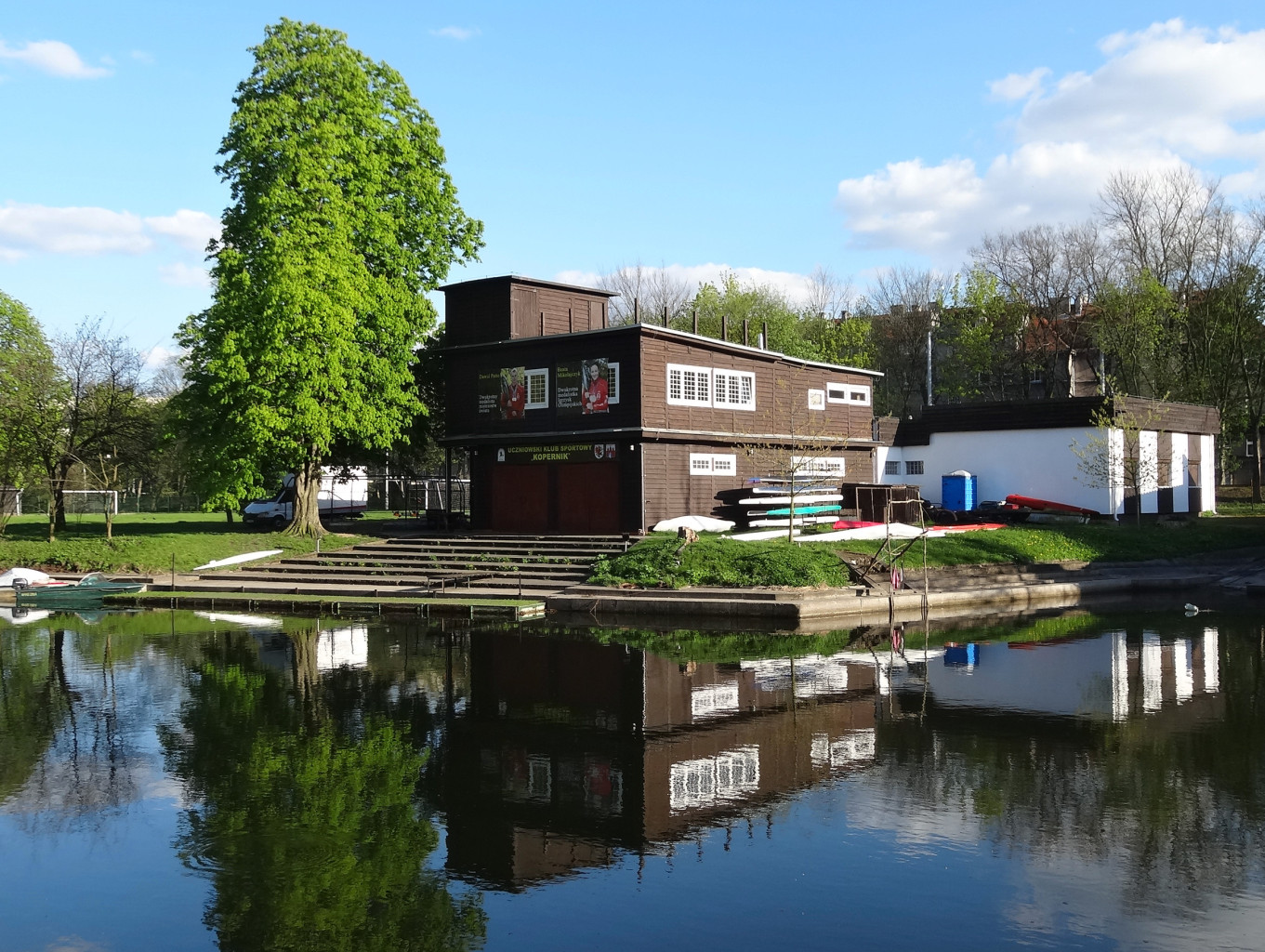
Boathouse at No.3

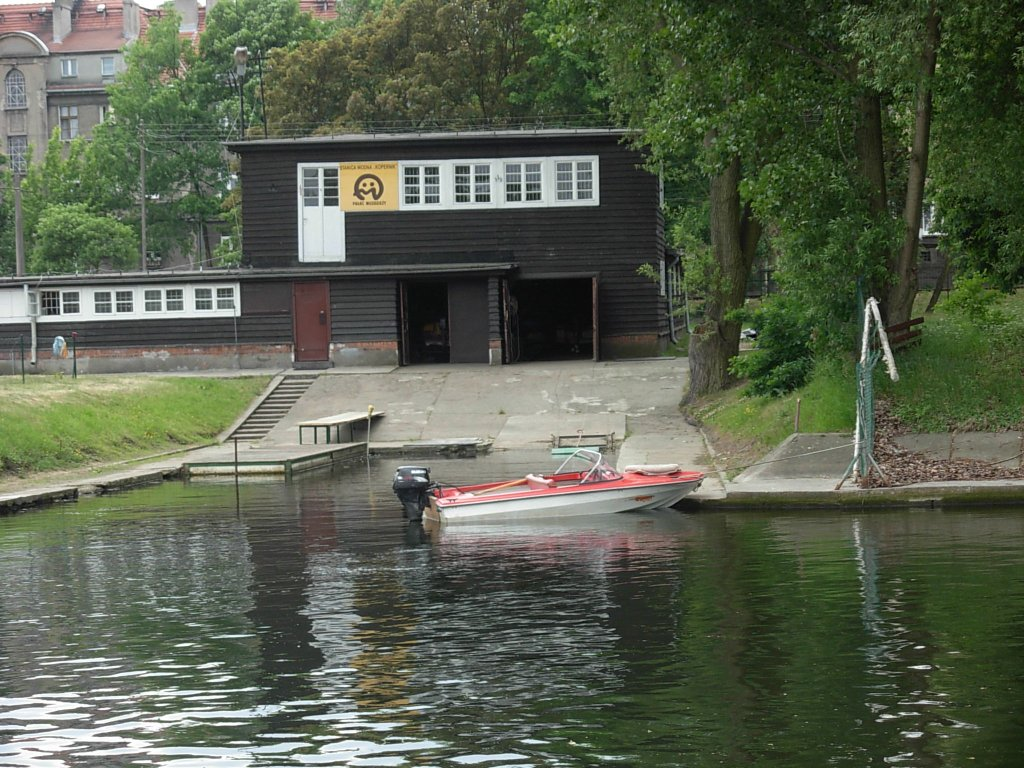
Boathouse of the UKS Kopernik

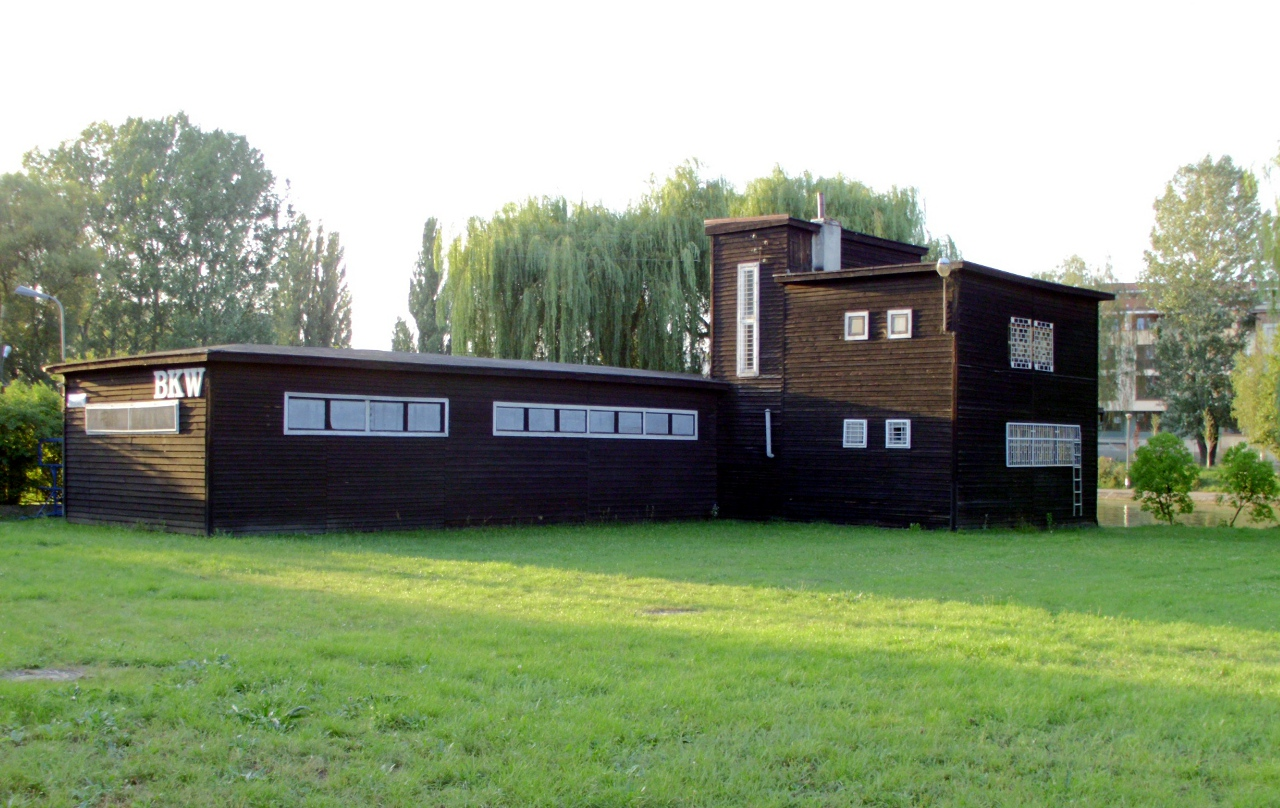
Boathouse of the Bydgoszcz Rowing Club registered on the heritage list

=== Tenement at 4a ===
The tenement was constructed in 1931. Its initial address was "22 Schifferstraße".

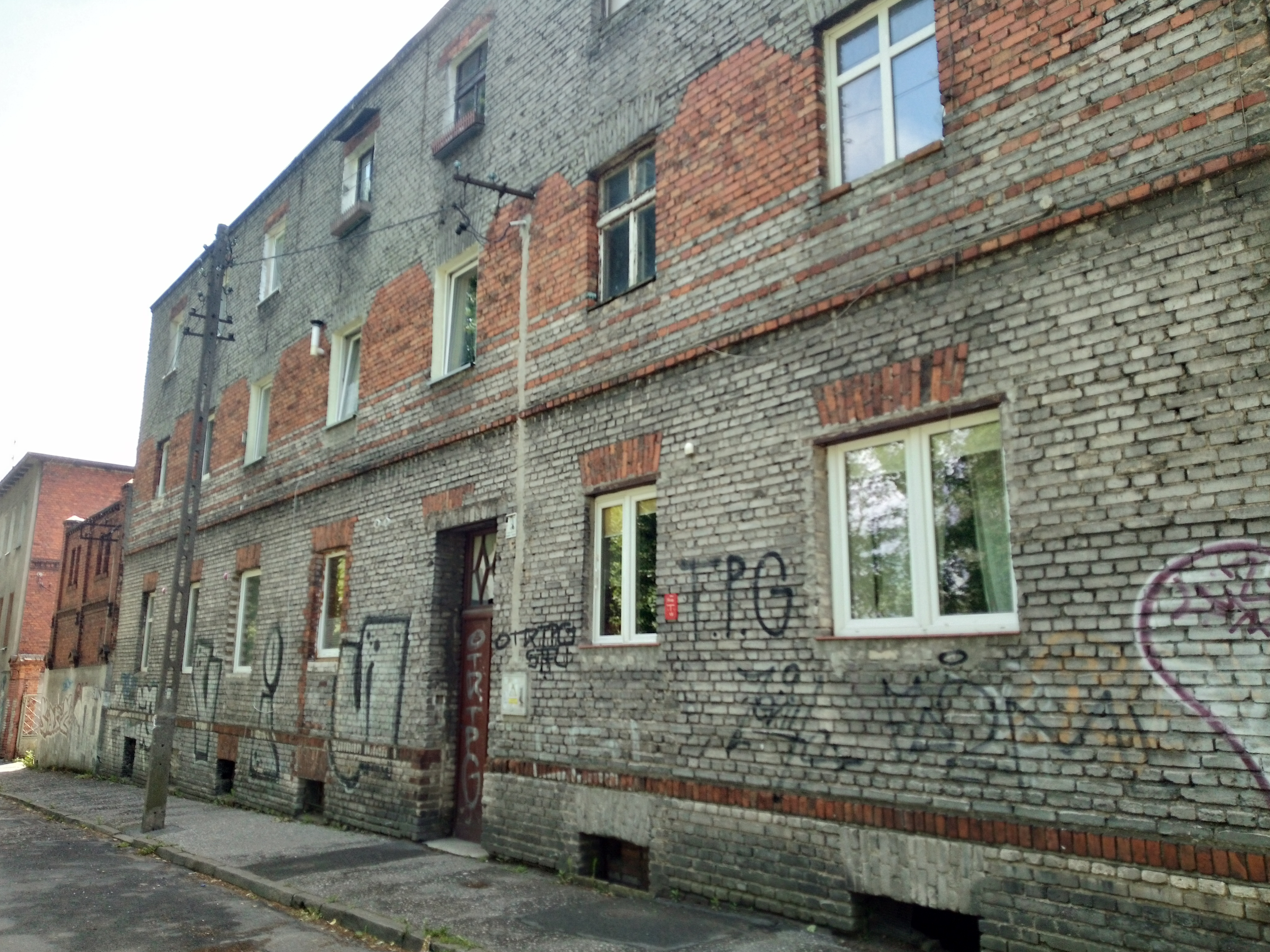
Main elevation

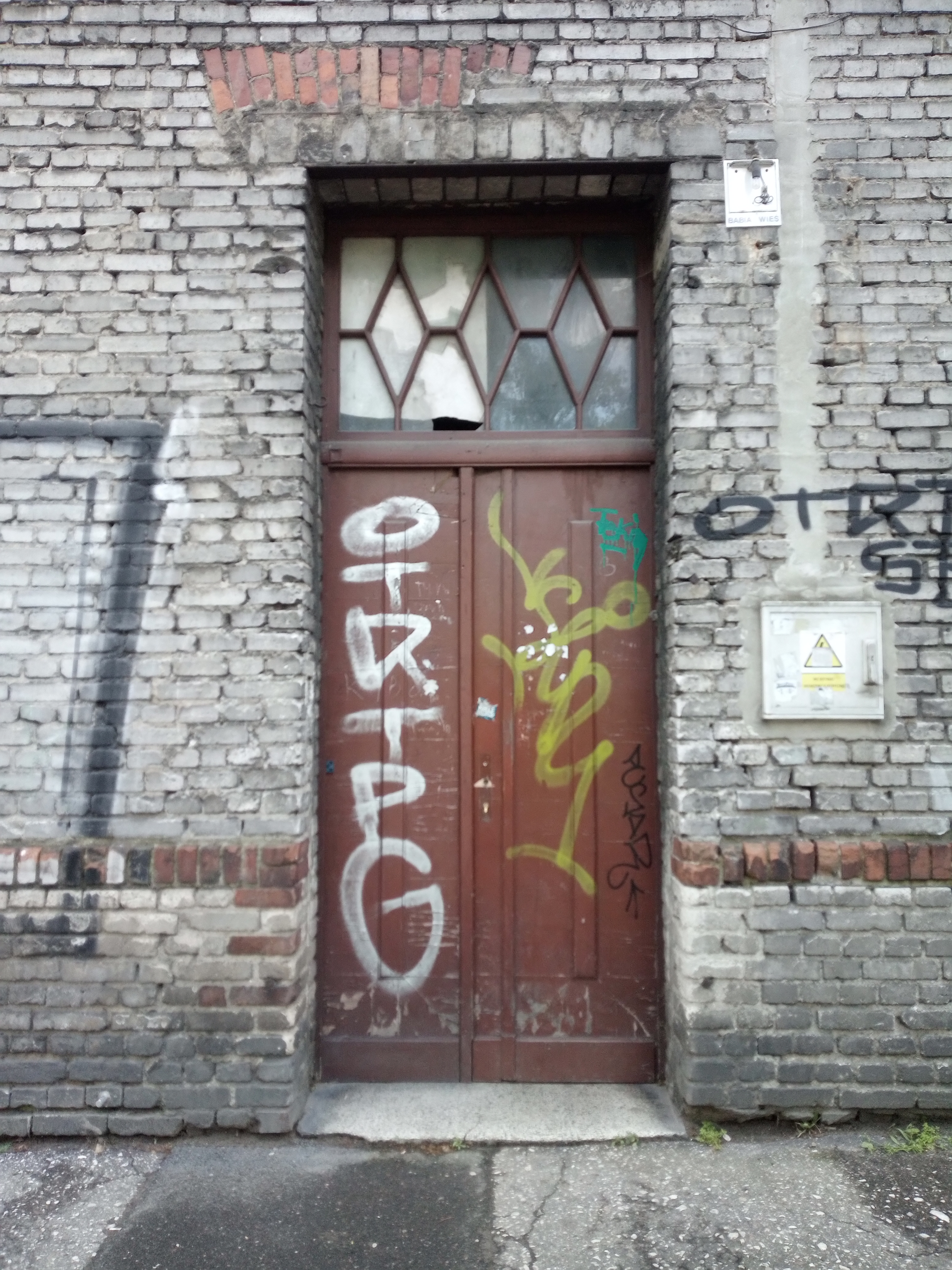
Detail of the entrance door

=== Tenements at 5 to 23 ===
This housing estate was constructed from 1925 to 1927 after a decision of the municipal authorities. It was designed by Bogdan Raczkowski. At the time, the numbering of the tenement ran from 3a to 3d. Each building was designed with a rectangular strip of land for the cultivation of vegetables and flowers in the backyard. Loggias are also present on both sides of the arched entrances, with the façades displaying ogee wall gables. A renovation was launched by the city in 2020 and will last several years.

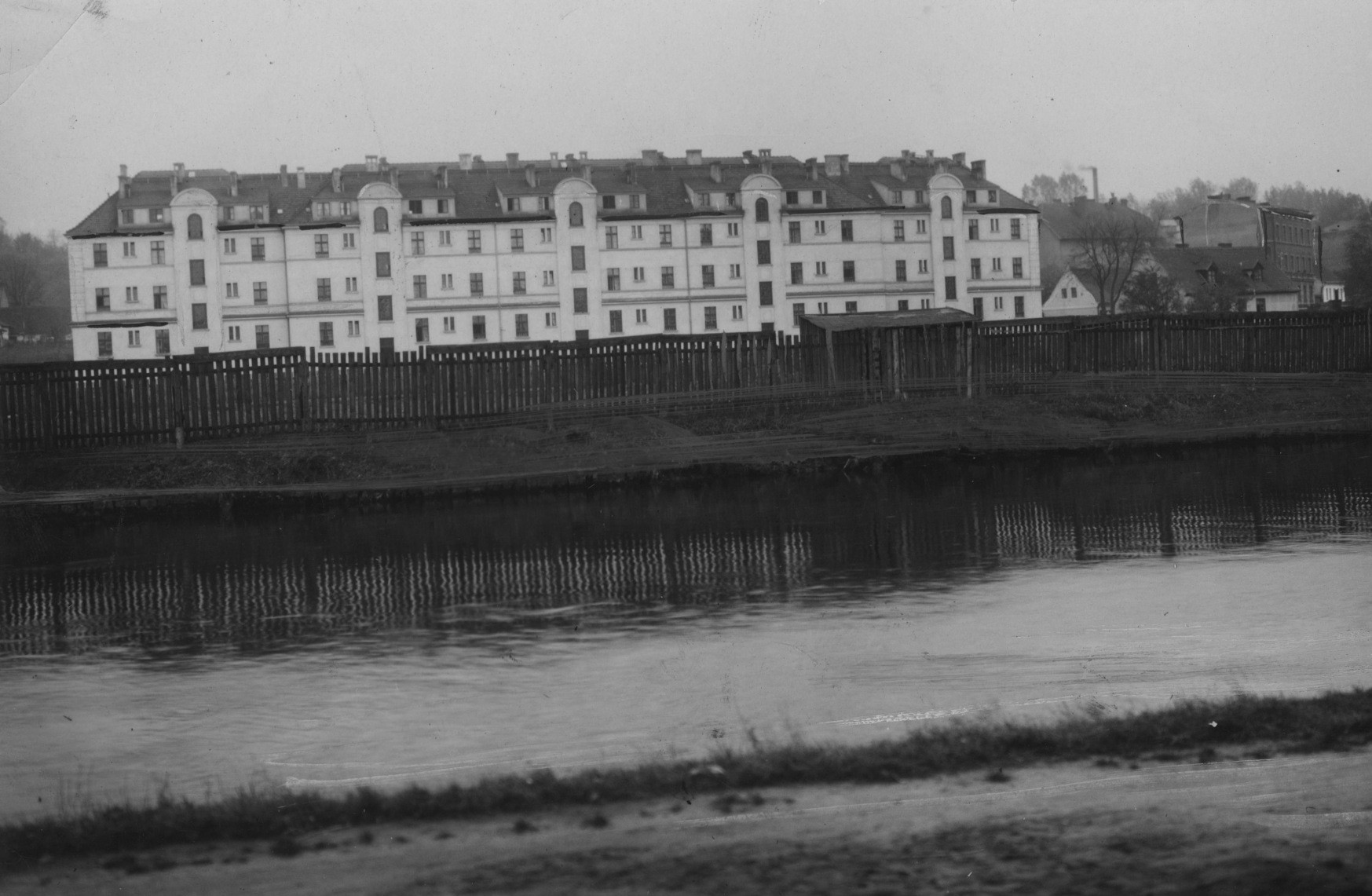
The building as seen from the left river side, c. 1930 – c. 1939

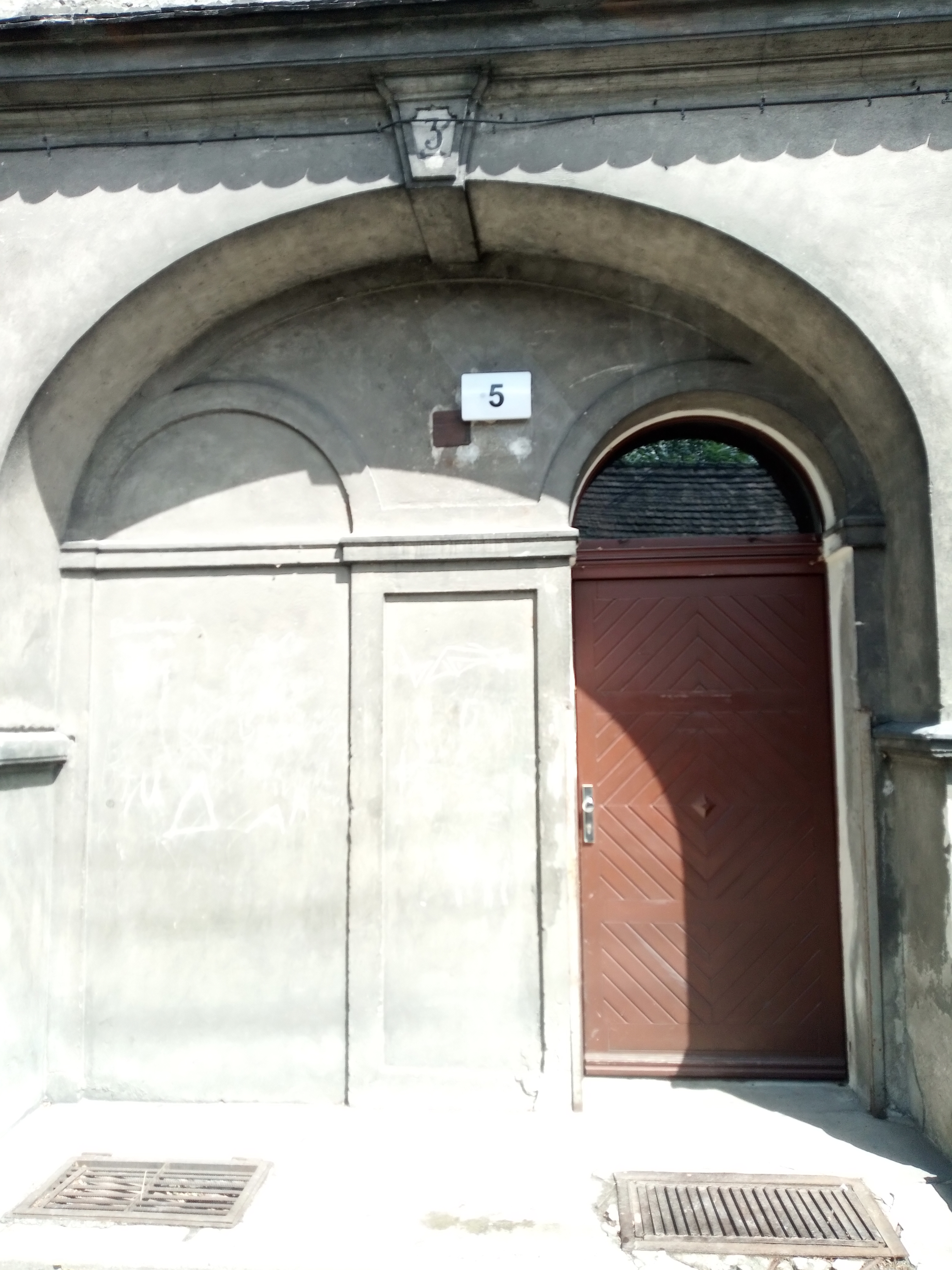
The arched entrance, still bearing the old numbering

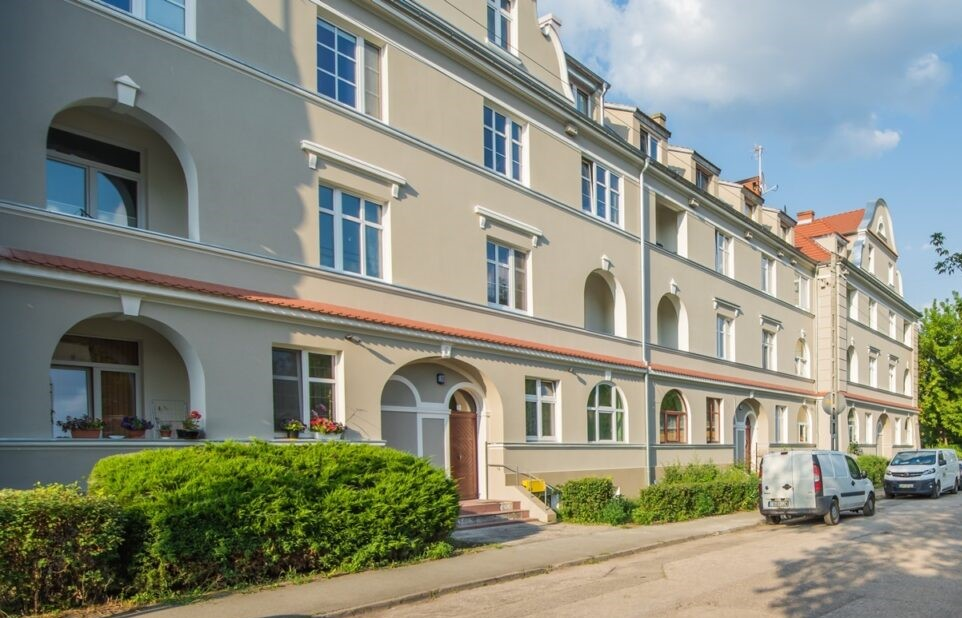
Renovated elevation

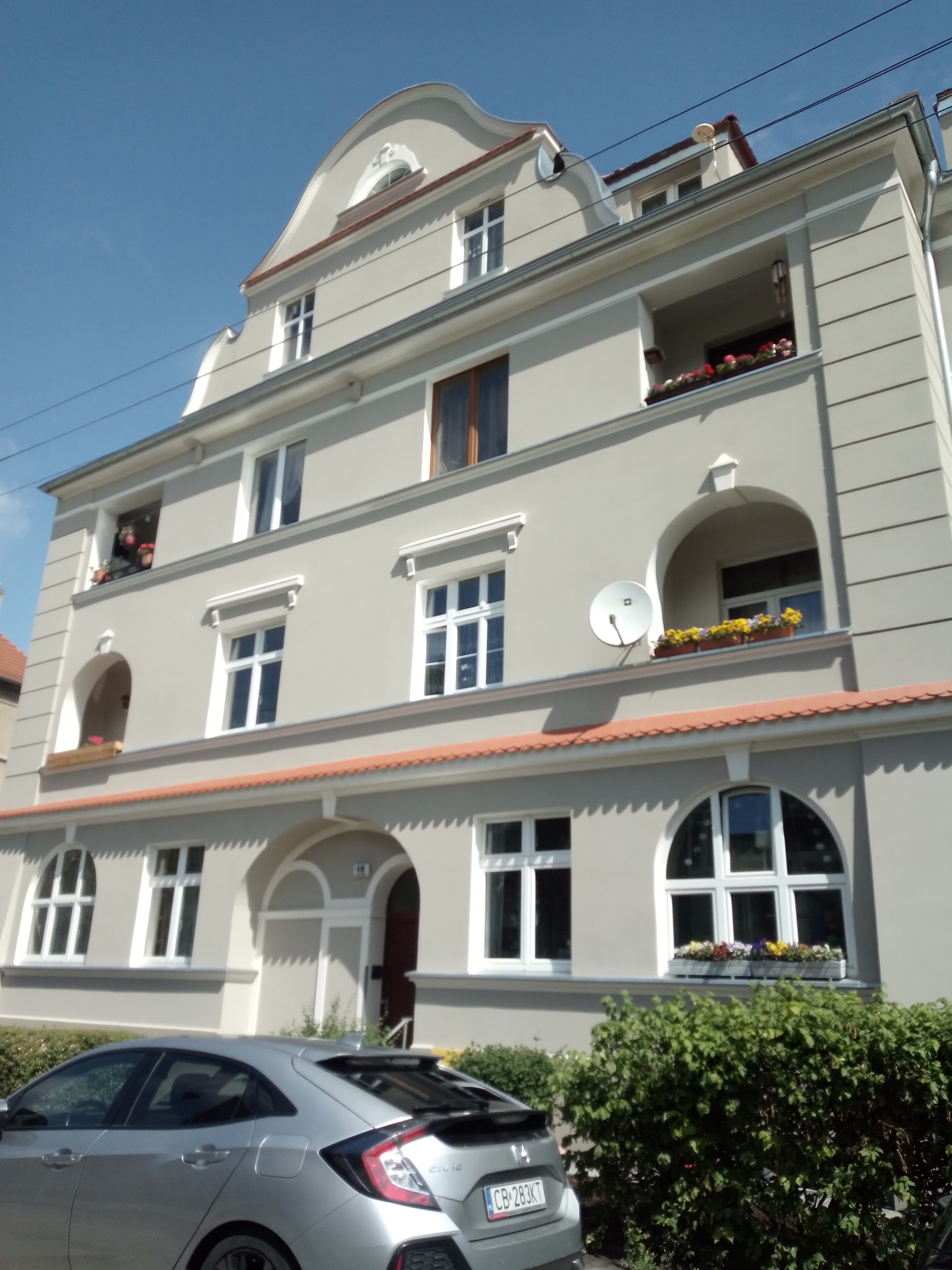
Detail of the renovated façade

=== Tenement at 6 (15 Toruńska Street) ===
This tenement was constructed in the 1890s. Its initial address was "6 Toruńska", previously "6 Thornerstraße". The first registered landlord of the building was Carl Bennewitz, a wheel craftsman producing wagons. The tenement has an elevation onto 15 Toruńska Street and the courtyard has an elevation onto Babia Wieś Street.

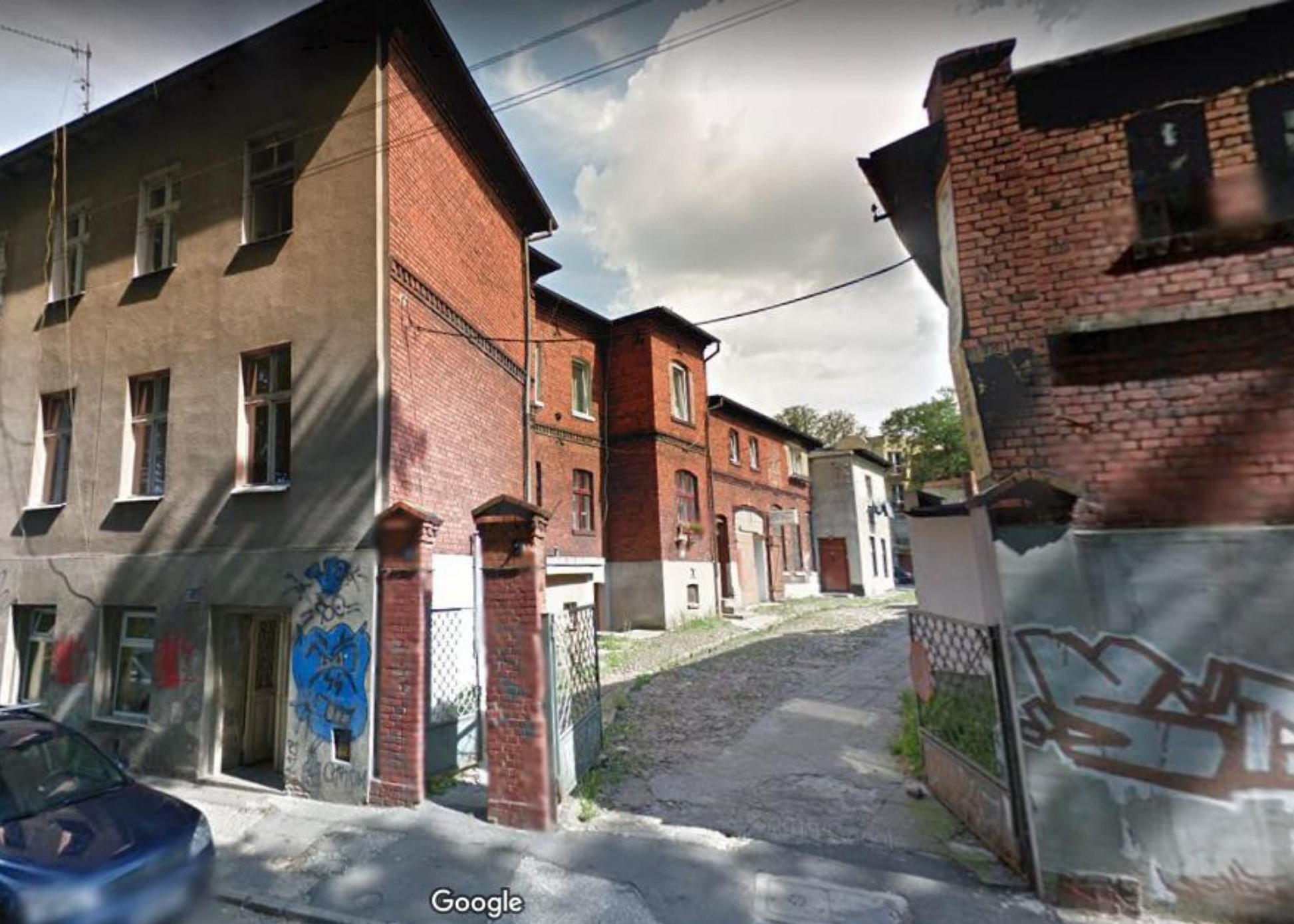
View of the courtyard from the Babia Wieś street

=== Tenement at 10 ===
This tenement was constructed at the end of the 19th century. Its initial address was "19 Schifferstraße". Jakob Michalski, a grocery merchant, was the first owner. The faded façade still offers some details of eclectic architecture: bossage, brick pediments, cartouches and top corbel tables.

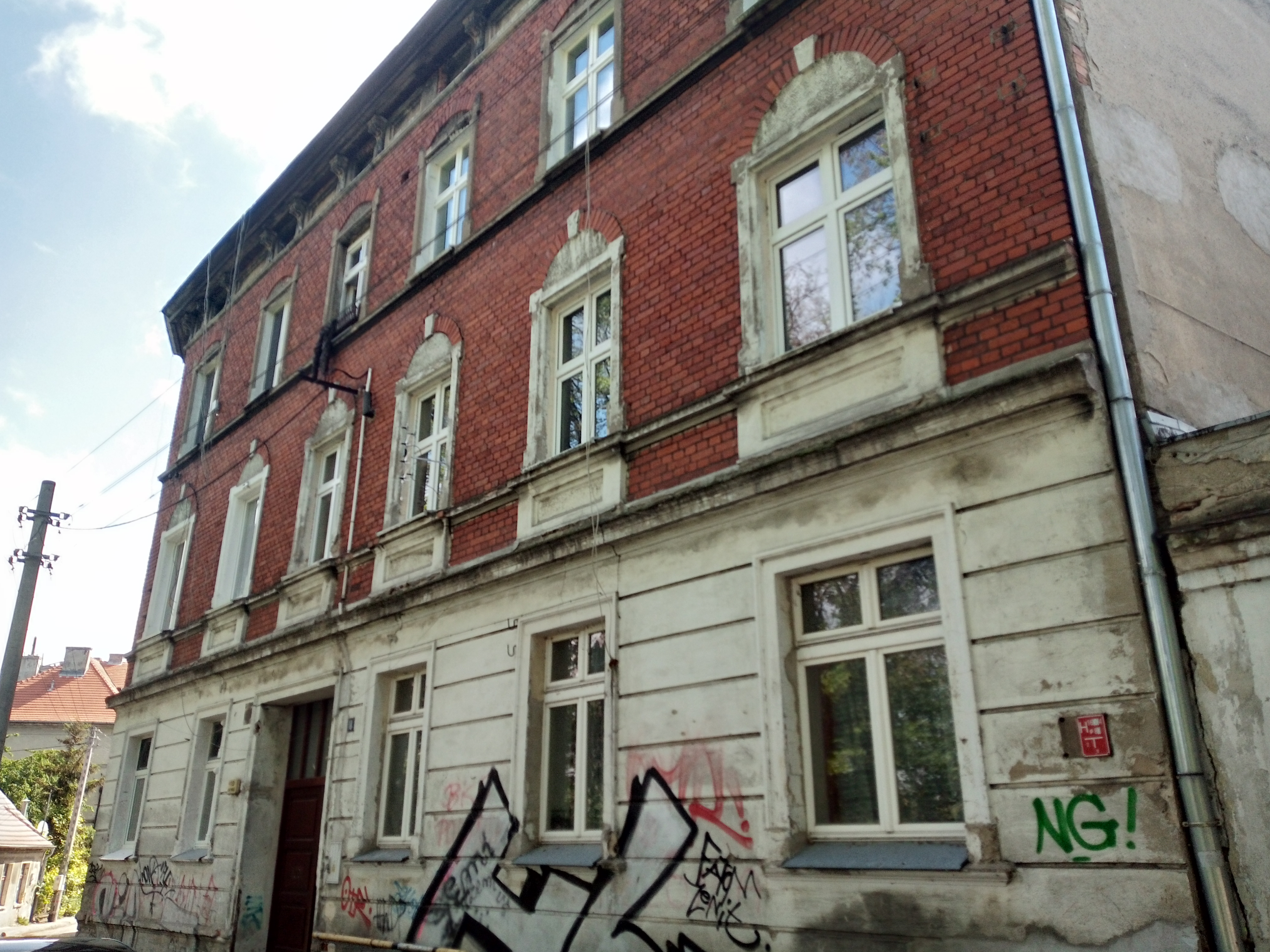
Main frontage onto Babia Wieś street

=== Tenement at 12 ===
In 2022, a new tenement was unveiled at a plot, which had been occupied since the mid-1850s. The estate's design was done by the firm Spółdzielnia Mieszkaniowa „Nad Brdą”.

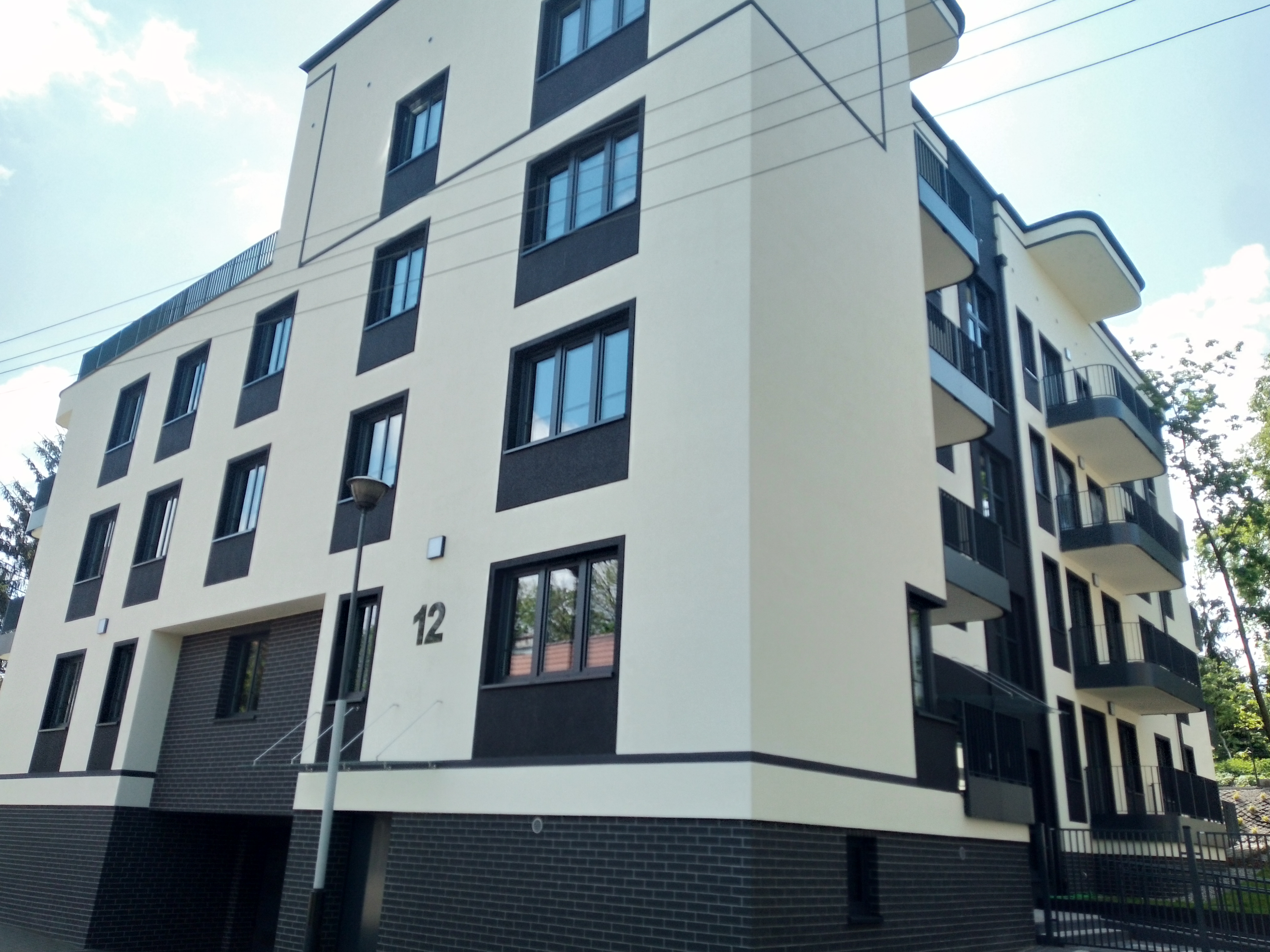
New estate ensemble at Nr.12

=== Tenement at 14 ===
Constructed towards the end of 19th century, the house at 14 was registered at its erection at "16/17 Schifferstraβe". It was originally the property of Eleonore and Wilhlem Bublitz. The latter was a railway worker. The backyard of the house harbors a commercial workshop.

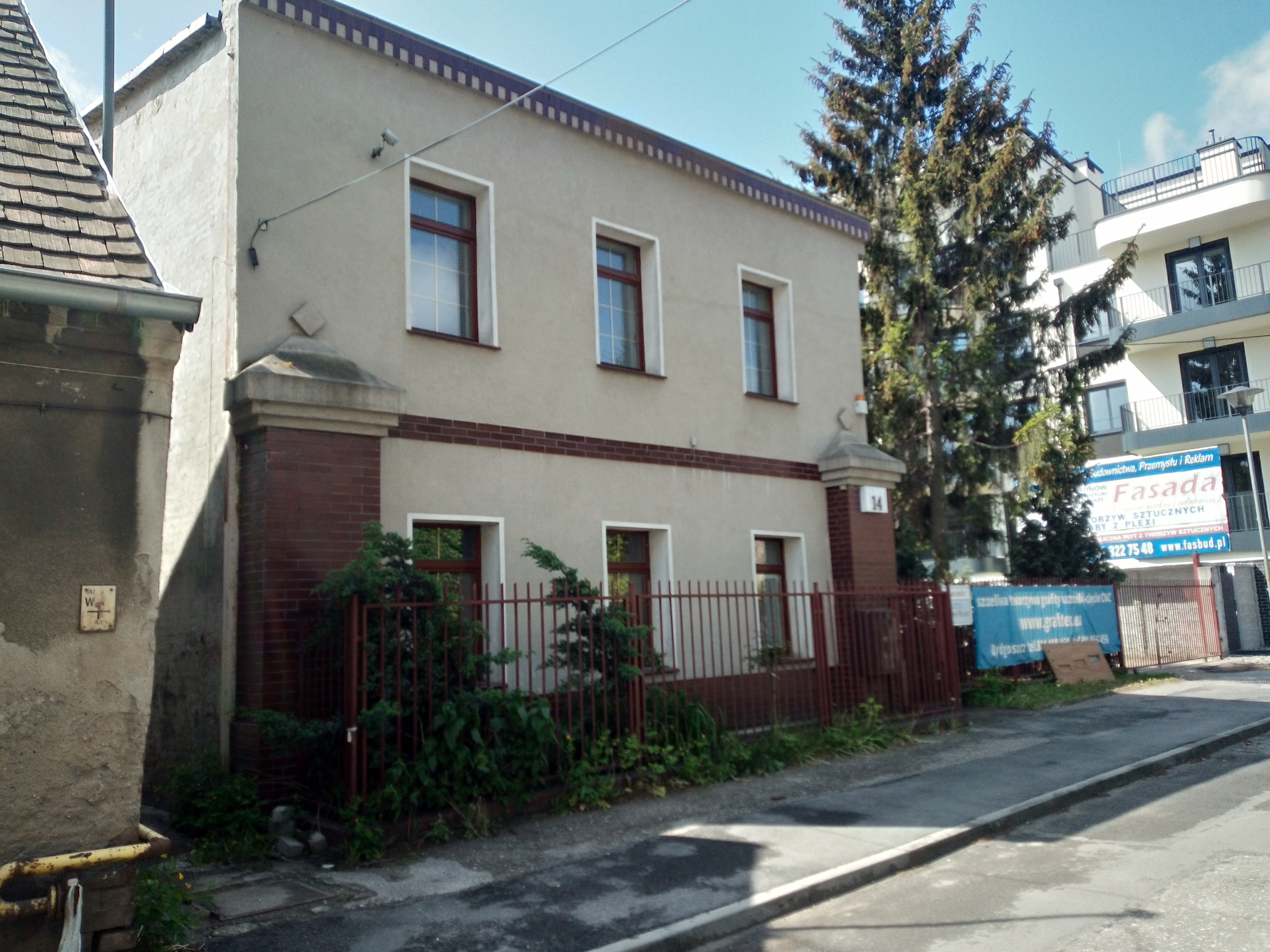
Main facade on the street

=== Building at 20 ===
Constructed in 2022, the edifice is an extension of the Sue Ryder's Psychoneurology Center for Old Age ("Polish: Centrum Psychoneurologii Wieku Podeszłego") at 29 Toruńska. The recently added facility at 20 Babia Wieś street is a day care center ("Polish: Dzienny Dom Opieki Medycznej").

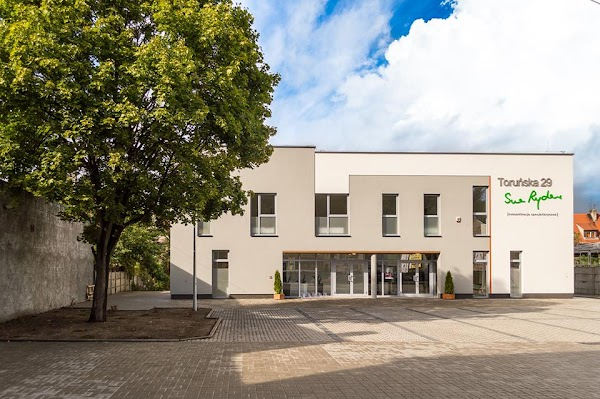
View of the Sue Ryder Center at 29 Toruńska street

=== Tenement at 22 ===
From the late 19th century to the 1920s, the plot was a garden that extended from Toruńska to Babia Wieś. In 1930, the plot was acquired by Jan Tykwiński, who had the tenement constructed that year.

Although badly damaged, the house mirrors other modernist edifices from the similar period in Bydgoszcz, like in Asnyka or in Chodkiewicza.

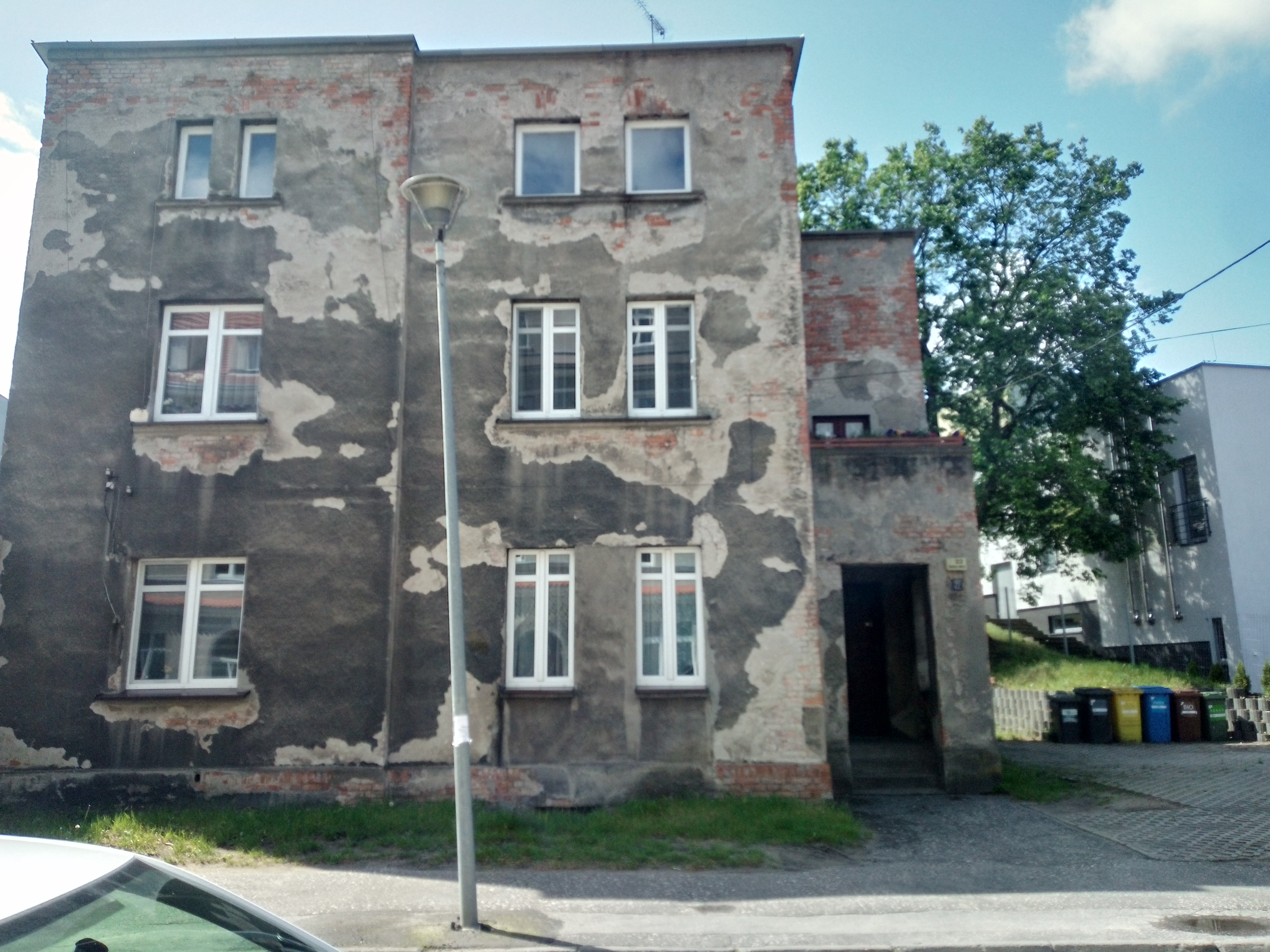
View from the street

=== Villa at 37 Toruńska street, corner with Babia Wieś street ===
Dated from 1897, as mentioned on the facade pediment, the villa was owned by a butcher, Richard Fröhlich. At the time, its address was 12 Thörnerstraße. Renovated in 2021, the villa displays many architectural motifs, in particular a window above the entrance adorned with columns bearing lion heads, a triangular gable, and two urns standing at each extremity of the elevation.

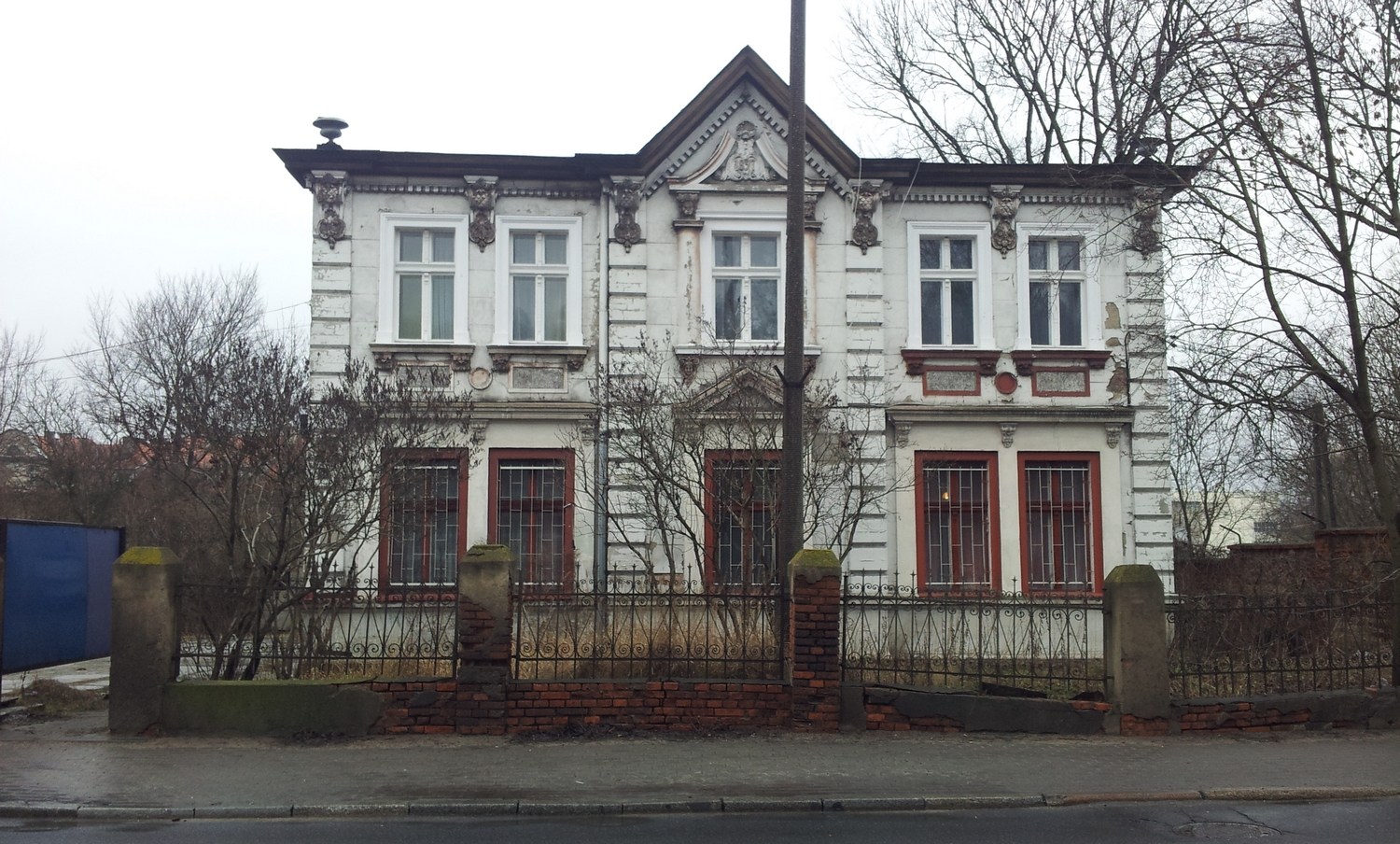
View from the street

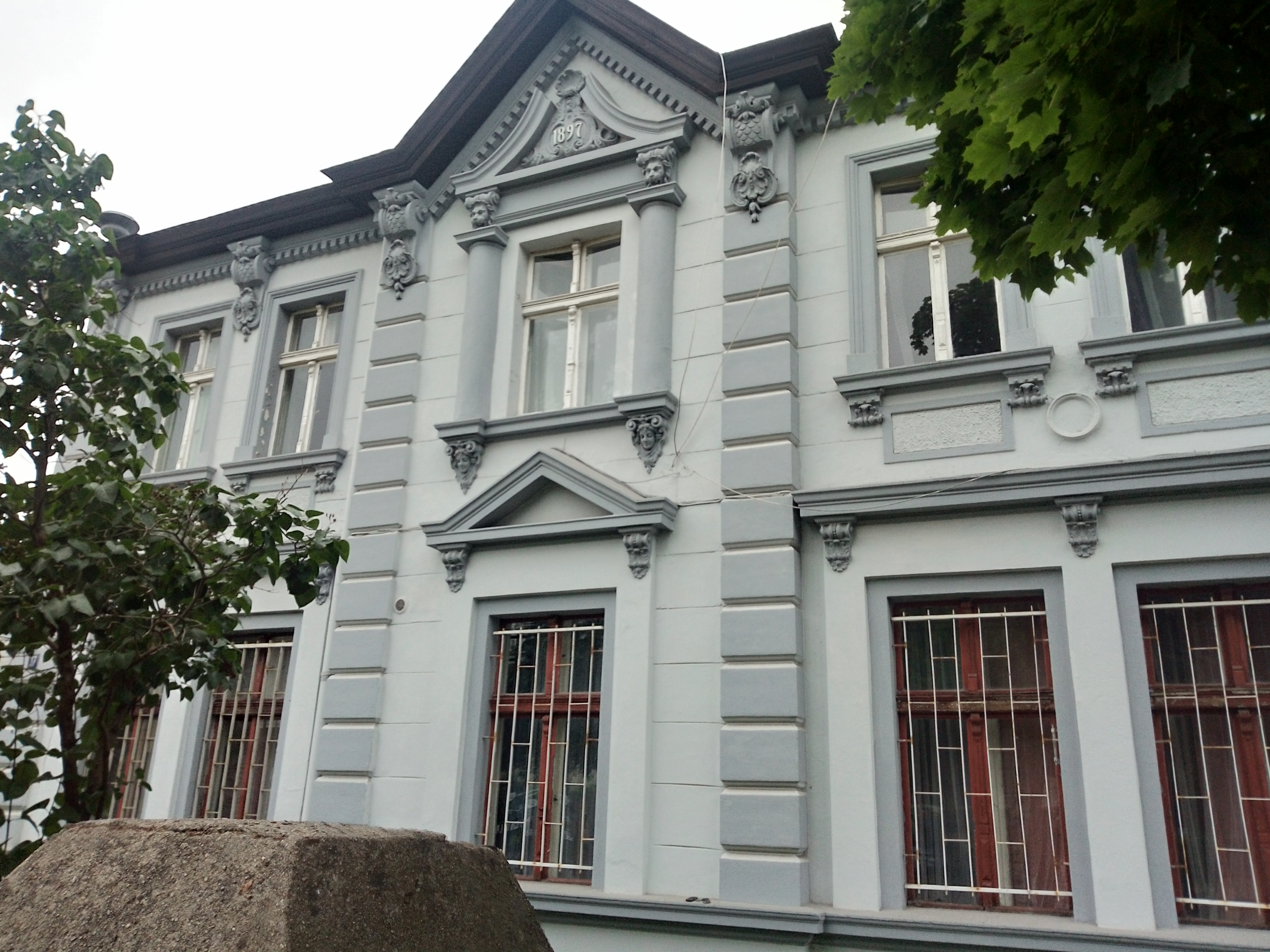
The villa after renovation

== See also ==
- Bydgoszcz
- Bogdan Raczkowski
- Sue Ryder
- (in Polish) Babia Wieś district
- (in Polish) UKS Kopernik Bydgoszcz
- (in Polish) Bydgoski Klub Wioślarek (BKW)

== Bibliography ==
- Umiński, Janusz (1996). Bydgoszcz. Przewodnik (in Polish). Bydgoszcz: Regionalny Oddział PTTK "Szlak Brdy".
- Mrozik, Konrad (1987). Bydgoskie wioślarstwo lat międzywojennych. Kalendarz Bydgoski (in Polish). Bydgoszcz: Towarzystwo Miłośników Miasta Bydgoszczy. pp. 55–61.
