= Bernardine Church of Our Lady Queen of Peace, Bydgoszcz =

Catholic Church, Bydgoszcz, Poland, Mid-16th century

Coordinates: 53°07′11.6″N 18°00′26.1″E

Bernardine Church of Our Lady Queen of Peace in Bydgoszcz
- Polish: Kościół pobernardyński Najświętszej Maryi Panny Królowej Pokoju w Bydgoszczy
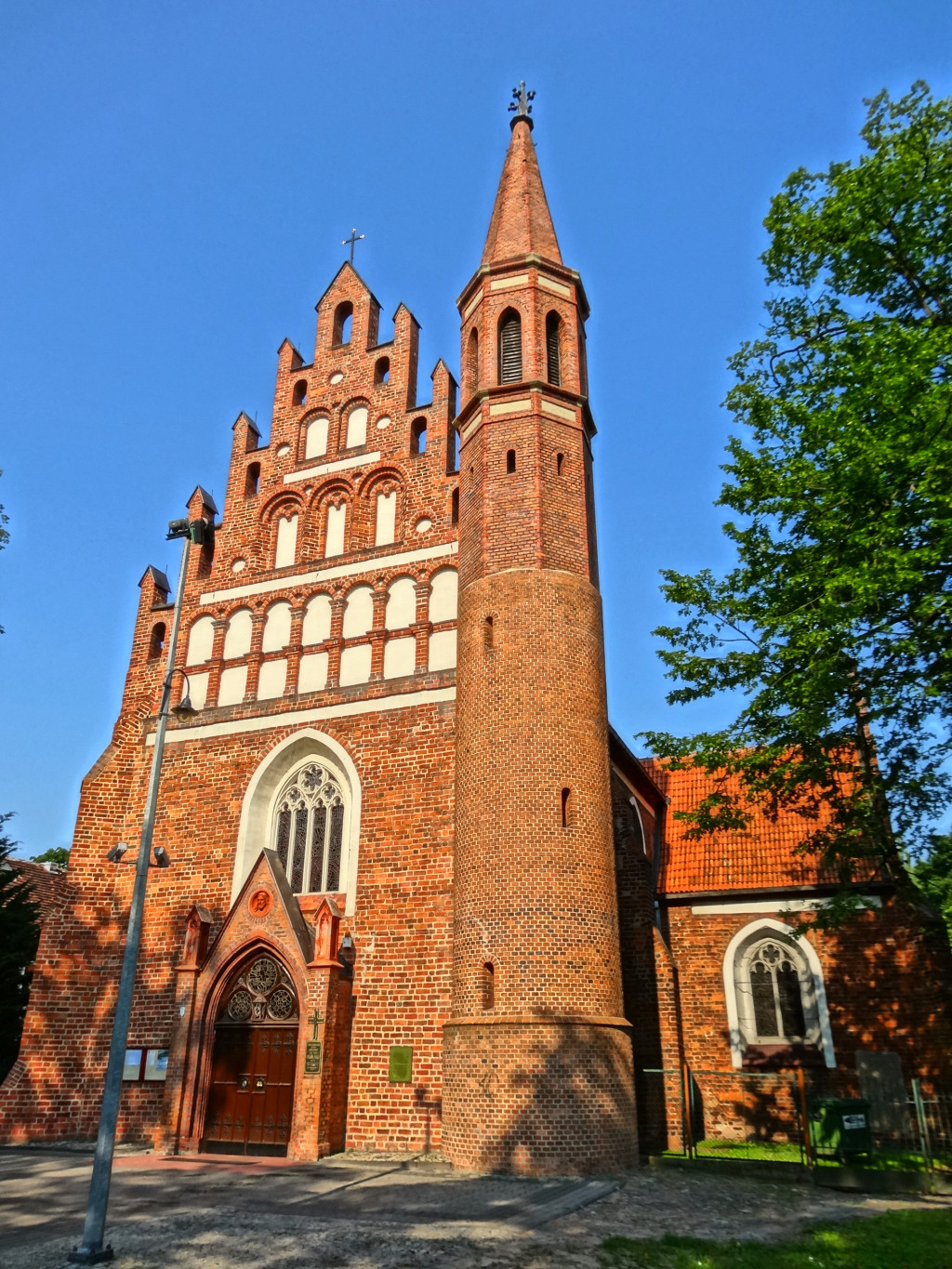
- Church of Our Lady Queen of Peace in Bydgoszcz
- Bernardine Church of Our Lady Queen of Peace in Bydgoszcz
- Location: Bernardyńska Street, Bydgoszcz
- Country: Poland
- Denomination: Catholic Church
- Website: https://www.pwbydgoszcz.pl/

History
- Status: Church
- Dedication: Mary, mother of Jesus
- Dedicated: 1557

Architecture
- Functional status: Active
- Heritage designation: Nr.601227, Reg.A/674 (March 4, 1931) and Nr.601228, Reg.A/674 (September 30, 1992):.
- Architectural type: Late Gothic architecture
- Completed: 1552-1557

Specifications
- Materials: Brick

The Bernardine Church of Our Lady Queen of Peace is a historic church from 1557, located in Bernardyńska street, in Bydgoszcz, Poland. Its patron was initially Saint George: in 1971, Polish primate Stefan Wyszyński changed its title to the current one.

== History ==
The origin of the church dates back to 1480, when the first Bernardine monks arrived in Bydgoszcz, coming from Kraków. The decision to invite Bernardines was made by king Casimir IV Jagiellon, while staying in Bydgoszcz castle during the Thirteen Years' War (1454–1466) against the Teutonic Knights. On December 5, 1480, Wloclawek's bishop Zbigniew Oleśnicki granted the erection of a Bernardine monastery in the city, only the third one in Poland after Kraków's and Warsaw's. Its main official founders were king Casimir IV Jagiellon, Hińcza of Rogów, Jarand of Pomian and Bydgoszcz's Starost Jan Kościelecki. The latter donated land from his castle for this purpose.

This is how the Polish chronicler Jan Długosz depicted the event:

On the other side of the Brda River, to Kujawy settled down our brothers. A place was given to them with the consent of His Majesty the Polish King Casimir IV Jagiello, His Most Reverend Zbigniew Oleśnicki, bishop of Wloclawek. His episcopal Majesty arrived together with his brother Michał Bal and his brother Stanislaw from Kłobuck, yore a famous of preacher, and two other brothers, designated by order of His Majesty to choose the place according to their taste. Attending also were its highness Jan Kościelecki, governor of Bydgoszcz, (...) There, the brothers chose a place convenient to the monastery as they saw it.

=== First building ===
The construction of St. Jerome and St. Francis church has been completed in 1485 and the monastery library in 1488. The original temple was made of brick, as depicted by notes from preserved Bernardine chronicles:

Brothers of the Order after receiving permission for the construction of the convent, performed bricks, prepared lime, (...) cleared the bushes.

Like in other areas, the Bernardine monastery created an outstanding environment for intellectual culture development in the town. From 1518 to 1524, the abbey was led by Bartholomew of Bydgoszcz, a scholar, author of the first Latin-Polish dictionary (1532, 1544). During the 17th century, the abbot, Paweł of Łęczyca, was an active supporter of urban decorations, founder of the extensive gardens of the monastery, which were ancestors of today's Bydgoszcz parks. The Bernardines created the largest library in the city (1919 volumes, partially preserved until today at the municipal library) and established a rhetoric school (1529–1774), an observatory (1677), and a brewery. On August 10, 1545, lightning struck the abbey, causing a fire that burned down the church and a large part of the monastic buildings: the only buildings left were the library, the vestry and the infirmary.

=== Second building ===
On September 23, 1552, king Sigismund II Augustus granted permission for the reconstruction of the burned Bernardine church, as long as it was not taller than the neighboring castle, for military-defensive purposes. The current architecture dates back to this period, displaying Gothic and Renaissance characteristics. Built between 1552 and 1557 with the financial help of the Kościelecki family, its name was later changed to Holy Trinity Church.

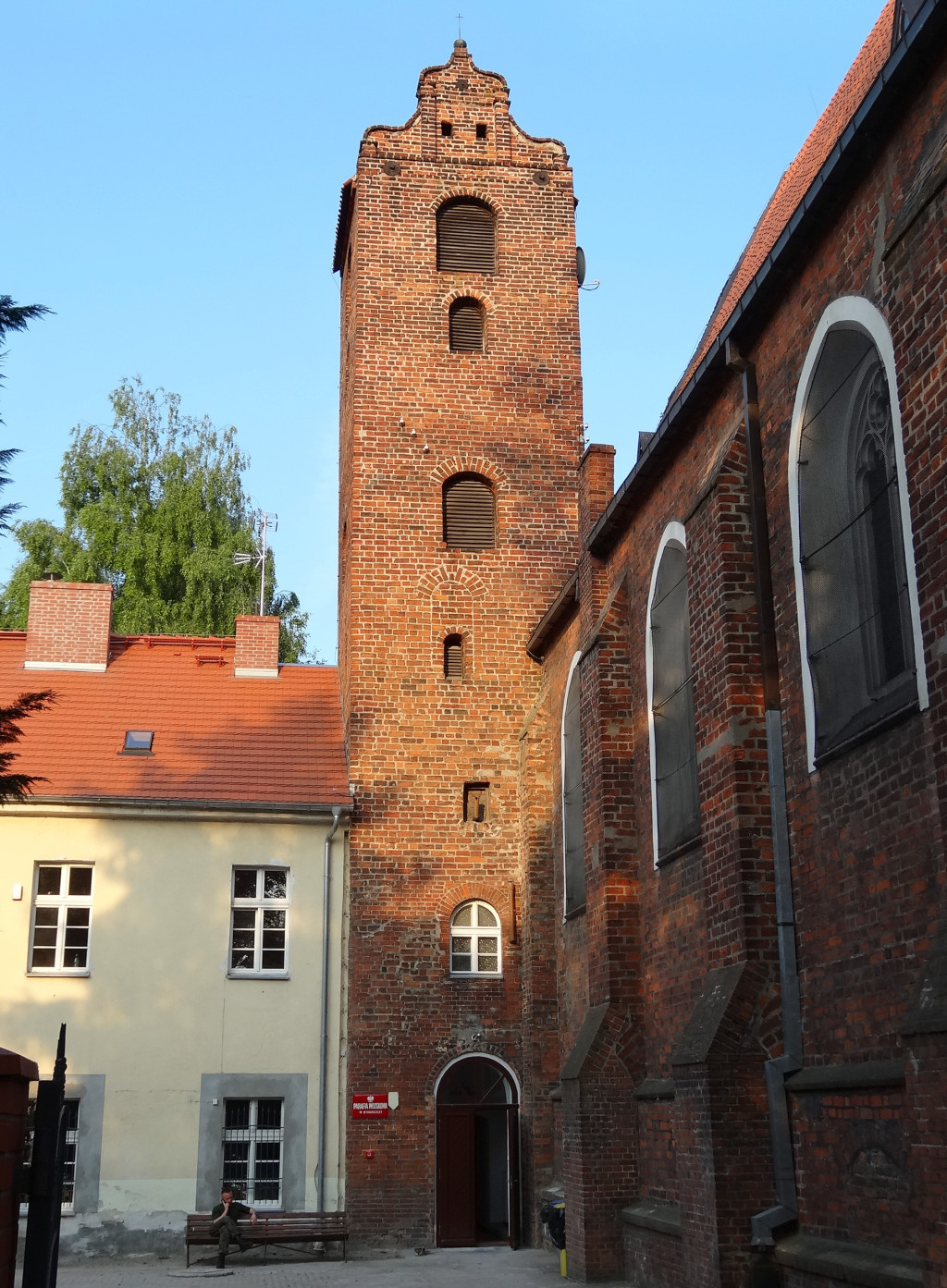
Square tower from the end of the 17th century

On September 10, 1559, Sebastian of Żydowo, a suffragan bishop of Gniezno, consecrated the Holy Cross altar in the church. In 1563, Herman Benincke, a bell founder from Gdańsk, cast the great bell of the monastery. The vault of the church was designed by Father Marcin of Bieganowo. The reconstruction lasted till 1602, when Stanisław Małżewski, a burgher and nobleman, founded the altar of the Holy Cross in the newly built in the newly erected chapel of Saint Anne on the southern side of the church, which still stands today. In 1595, Dorothy of Spławski, the wife of Jan Kościelecki, the Starost of Bydgoszcz, had the chapel of the convent decorated with polychrome and three green rugs. The Saint Anne Brotherhood altar was erected that same year.

After the Swedish invasions, the ruined church was rebuilt and renovated in the second half of the 17th century:

- a gable was placed on the western side;
- in 1677, a square tower was erected, preserved to this day;
- between 1682 and 1685, a chapel was built in the courtyard in front of the church, modeled after the sanctuary in Loreto, to commemorate the Battle of Vienna (1983).

Under Prussian rule, seven altars were listed as part of the church, with a rich decor and a collection of liturgical objects. According to a site survey carried out in 1745, the church was covered with tiles, the floor chancel was made of ceramic and the aisles' of wood.

The main altar, consecrated in 1559 and 1606 was covered with gold in 1760-1770: it is dedicated to the Holy Trinity, Mary of Nazareth and to several saints (Francis of Assisi, Bernardino of Siena, Louis and Bonaventure).

The other altars are dedicated to:

- St. Roch (in 1608);
- Mary of Nazareth (in 1645);
- Saint Anne (in 1645);
- Saint Anthony of Padua (in 1663),
- Saint Bonaventure (in 1663);
- Our Lady of the Immaculate Conception.

In 1605, was set in the choir a pipe organ, founded by two town citizens, Andrzej Grudziński and Daniel Jastrzębski. It was enlarged in 1618 and completely renovated in 1715. It survived until the secularization of the Catholic church decided by Prussian authorities.

Church bells were all purchased in the workshop of Herman Bennicek in Gdańsk, in 1563, 1605 and 1618.

=== Tombs ===
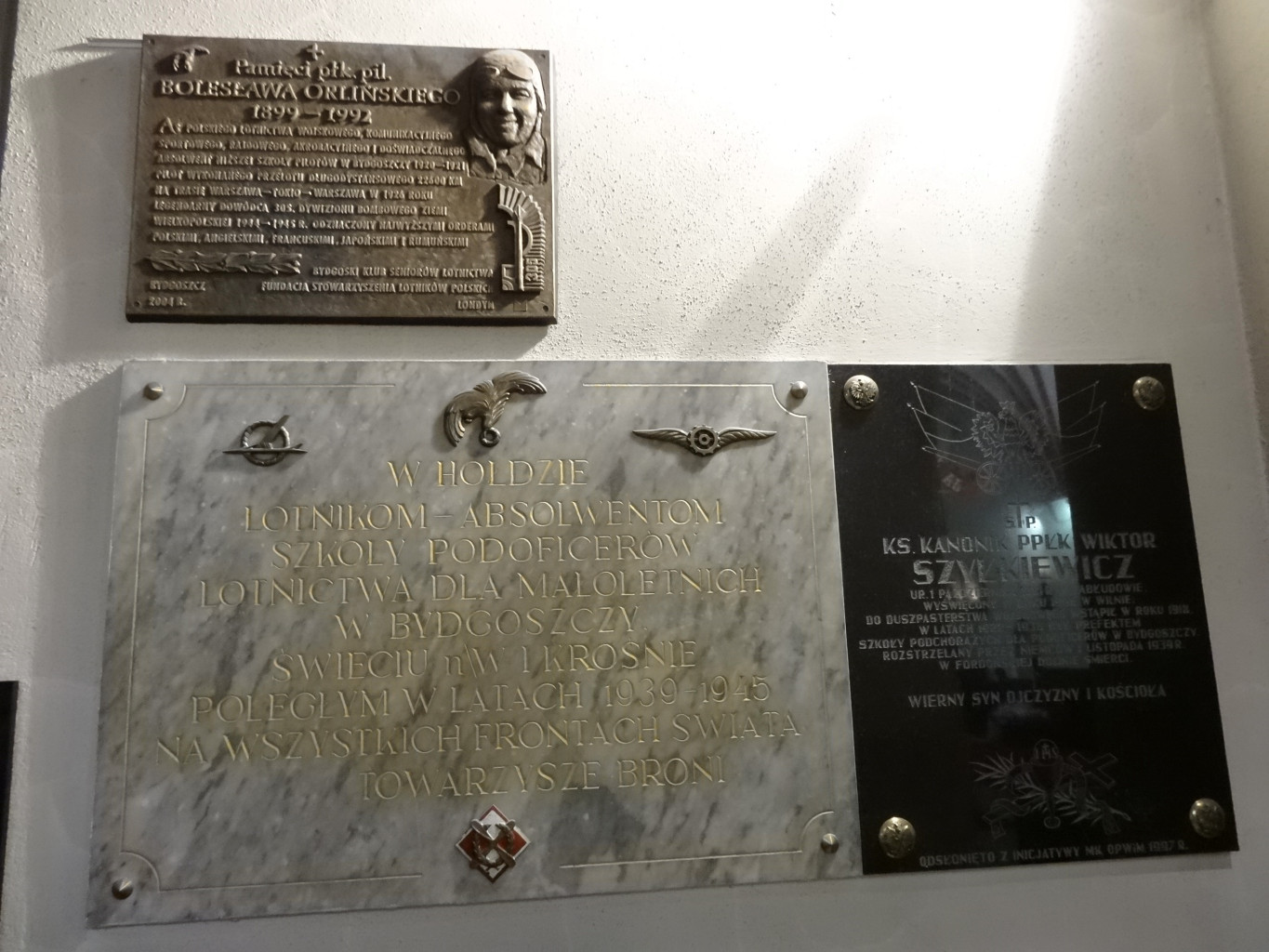
Commemorative plaques

Until the end of the 18th century, the crypt was used to bury religious members of the Bernardine Monastery, along with regular people who deserved to be honored by the convent and the church. Most important figures are buried under the floor of the church, including, among others:

- Paweł Koszucki (1609), secretary of the king and Wojski of Poznań, lord of Bartodzieje near Bydgoszcz;
- Mikołaj Jastrzębski (1610), disciple of Bernardine observance;
- Kazimierz Dornowski (1695), nobleman;
- Katarzyna Raczyńska (1695), wife of a judge from Nakło nad Notecią;
- Katarzyna Orzelska (1703), noblewoman;
- Stanisław Piniński (1715), burgrave of Bydgoszcz;
- Michał Komierowski (1766), nobleman;
- Teresa Grabowska (1769), royal favorite.

=== Prussian period (1772–1918) ===
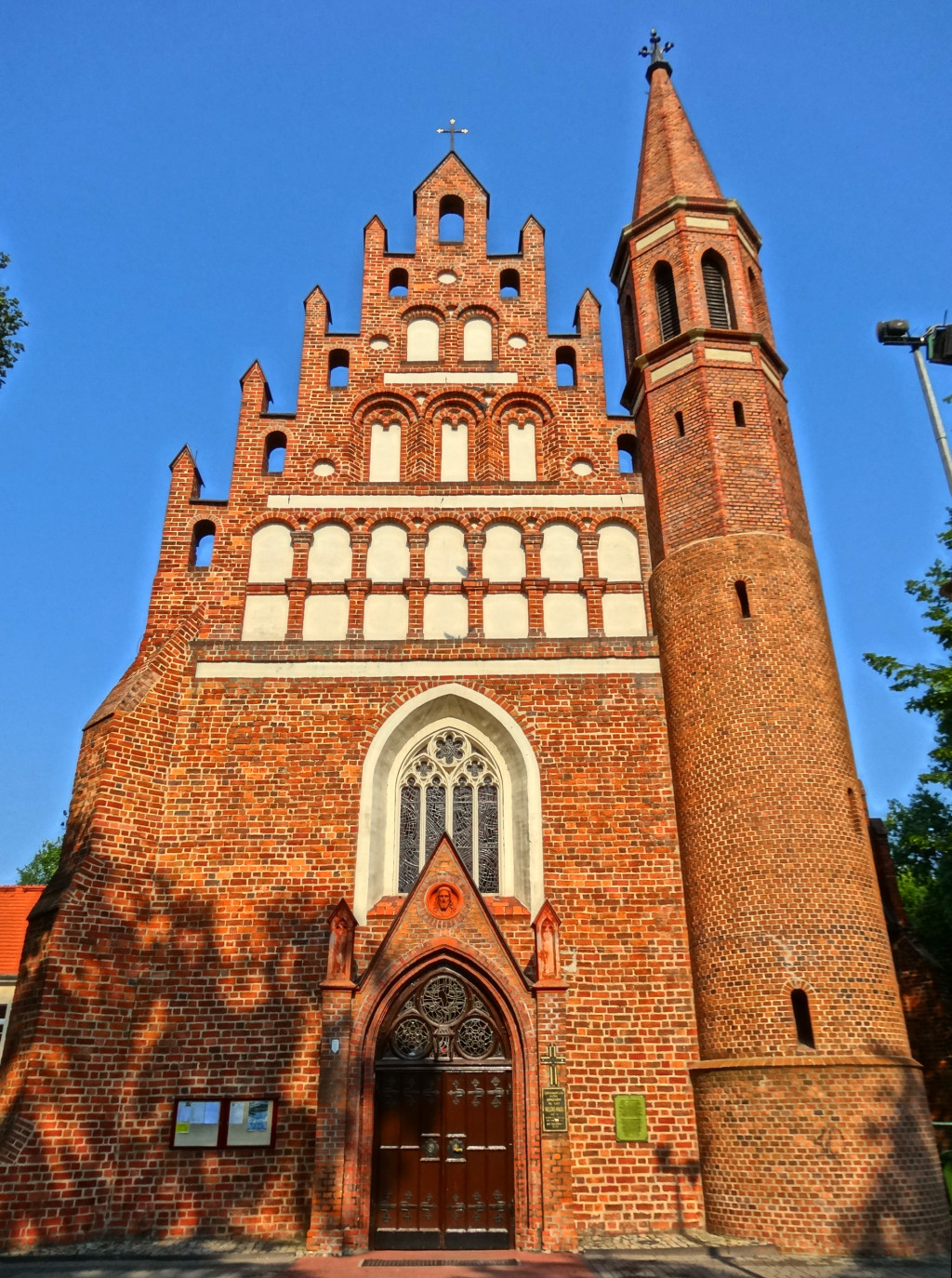
Neo-gothic main elevation

The church suffered significant damage in 1812, during the Russian occupation of the city. In 1817, the Prussian authorities carried out the dissolution of the monastery, but the expropriation per se of the church only took place after the death of the last monk, Father Nagabczyński in 1829.

The following year, the Prussian authorities handed over the church to the Evangelical community and the monastery to the Evangelical teachers seminary. Afterwards, the arcaded courtyard and the cloister were destroyed. In 1838, the decision was made to rename the church Garrison Church, for the use of soldiers from both faiths, Catholic and Evangelical (German: Simultankirche).

From 1840 to 1860, the ensemble was turned into a warehouse storing furniture and straw; it even housed a cartridge factory. The same fate befell the Poor Clares' Church on Gdańska Street. During this period, the authorities also demolished the Loreto chapel (1838) and had the interiors of the church thoroughly redesigned.

Between 1864 and 1866, the church was restored with Prussian funds under the supervision of Ferdinand von Quast (1807-1877), first Prussian royal monuments conservator. The main effort was focused on the western gable, which received neo-gothic features. The circular tower, its porch and the Gothic revival main elevation date back to this era.

=== Garrison church ===
After 1920 and the re-birth of the Polish Republic, the authorities confirmed the use of the church for garrison purposes, as it is still used today. The church was then re-consecrated in 1923, by military bishop Stanisław Gall (1868-1942). In 1926, it was renamed Saint George military parish church (Polish: wojskowy kościół parafialny pw. św. Jerzego).

During World War II, the temple was administered by German army chaplains. The last Polish chaplain of the garrison church, Father Wiktor Szyłkiewicz, was arrested and shot by the Nazis in September 1939; his grave is now in the Cemetery of Bydgoszcz Heroes. In 1945, the church resumed its function as a garrison church for the Polish army. In 1952, it was given the rank of Rector's church.

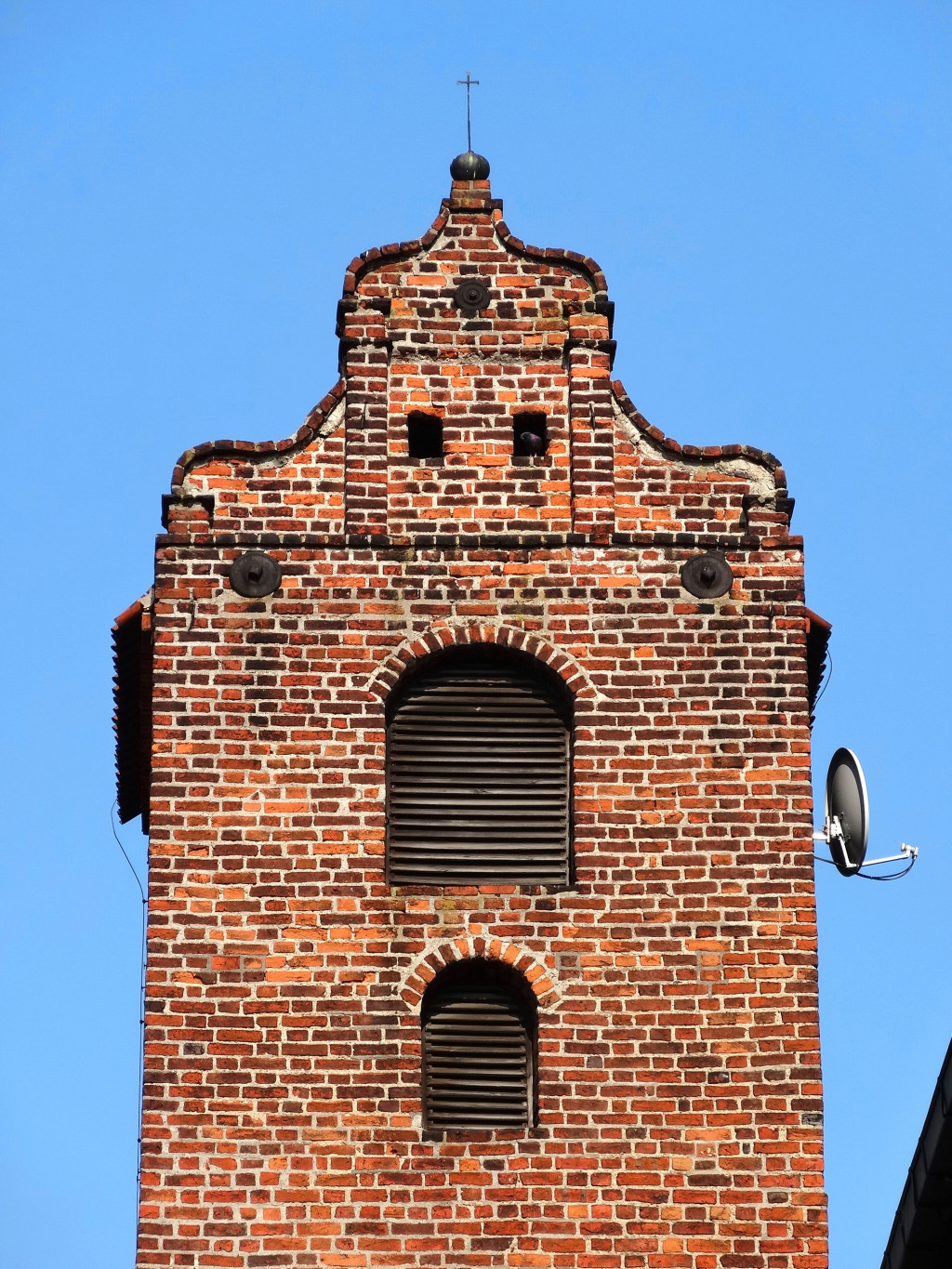
Detail of the square tower

On January 4, 1971, Cardinal Stefan Wyszyński endorsed the change of dedication as Church of Our Lady Queen of Peace. The ceremony of consecration took place on May 31, 1971.

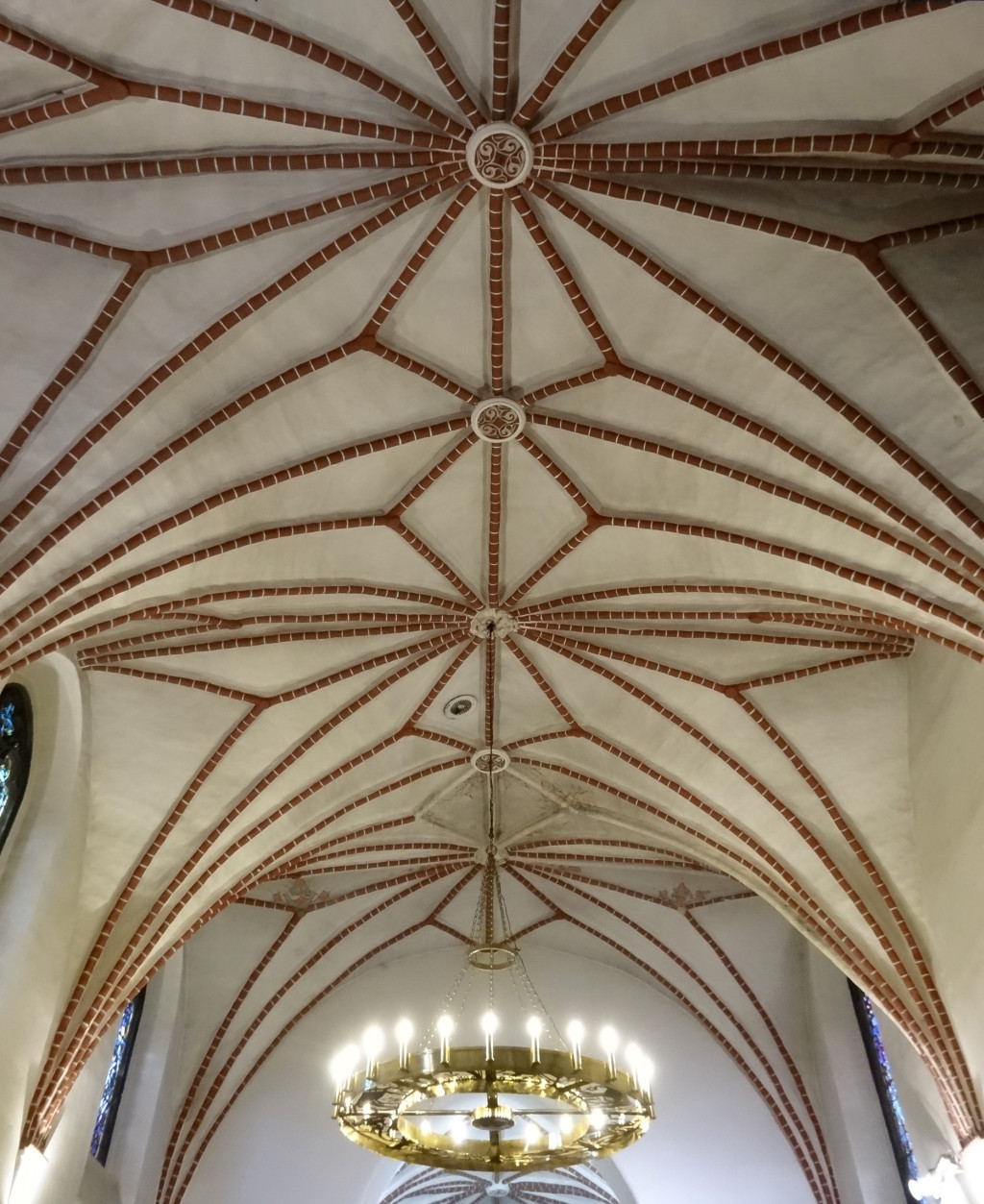
Stellar vaulted nave

== Architecture ==
=== Exteriors ===
The church was built according to late gothic style. The oriented building without transept houses a three-span nave. Brick was used as a building material, creating friezes under the eaves. One can notice blind plastered openings and friezes.

The western facade is topped with a stepped gable crowned with neo-Gothic pinnacles, dating from Prussian restoration works in 1864-1866. To the north of the chancel stands the 17th century bell tower in the form of a square-based tower, topped with ogee gables.

The cylindrical church tower is in the south-western corner; it comprises a partially-embedded staircase and two octagonal upper storeys topped by a neo-gothic brick flèche. The nave and chancel ogival openings are incorporating neo-Gothic traceries. Adjacent to the church stand the remaining buildings of the former Bernardine Monastery and the chapel of Saint Anne, built at the turn of the 16th and 17th centuries.

In 1967, archaeological excavations in the south of the church revealed the foundations of the Loreto chapel, the remnants of the cloister galleries and a former municipal water oak pipe from the 16th century.

=== Interiors ===
The interiors include the stellar vaulted nave and a presbytery, separated by a wall pierced by an arched opening. The walls are covered with 17th century tombstones.

In 1999, during the replacement of the old floor, underground crypt burials were also discovered. The church possesses the oldest known fresco of the city: an eagle from the first half of the 17th century.

The oldest artefact is a rococo pulpit from the second half of the 18th century.

Former paintings of the Garrison church have moved in the first half of the 19th century to the southern aisle of cathedral :

- Saint Roch (from 1696), placed to the right of the side entrance;
- Saint Anthony of Padua (beginning of the 18th century), placed to the left of the side entrance.

Half of the collection of the old library that has survived to this day dates back to the 16th century, it includes 98 incunables published by the end of 1500. They are preserved at the Provincial and Municipal Public Library located on the Old Market square.

== Gallery ==
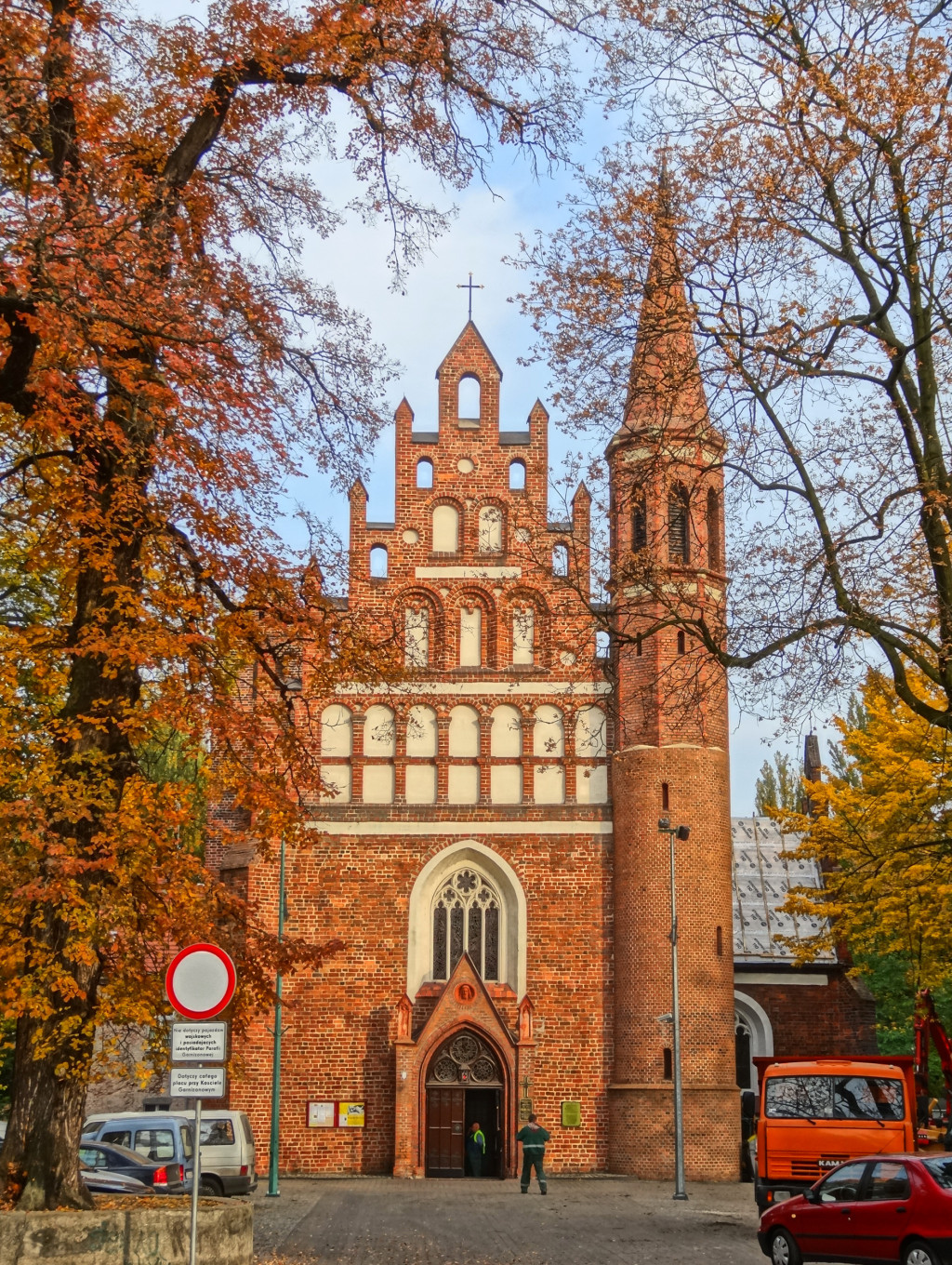
View from Bernardyńska Street

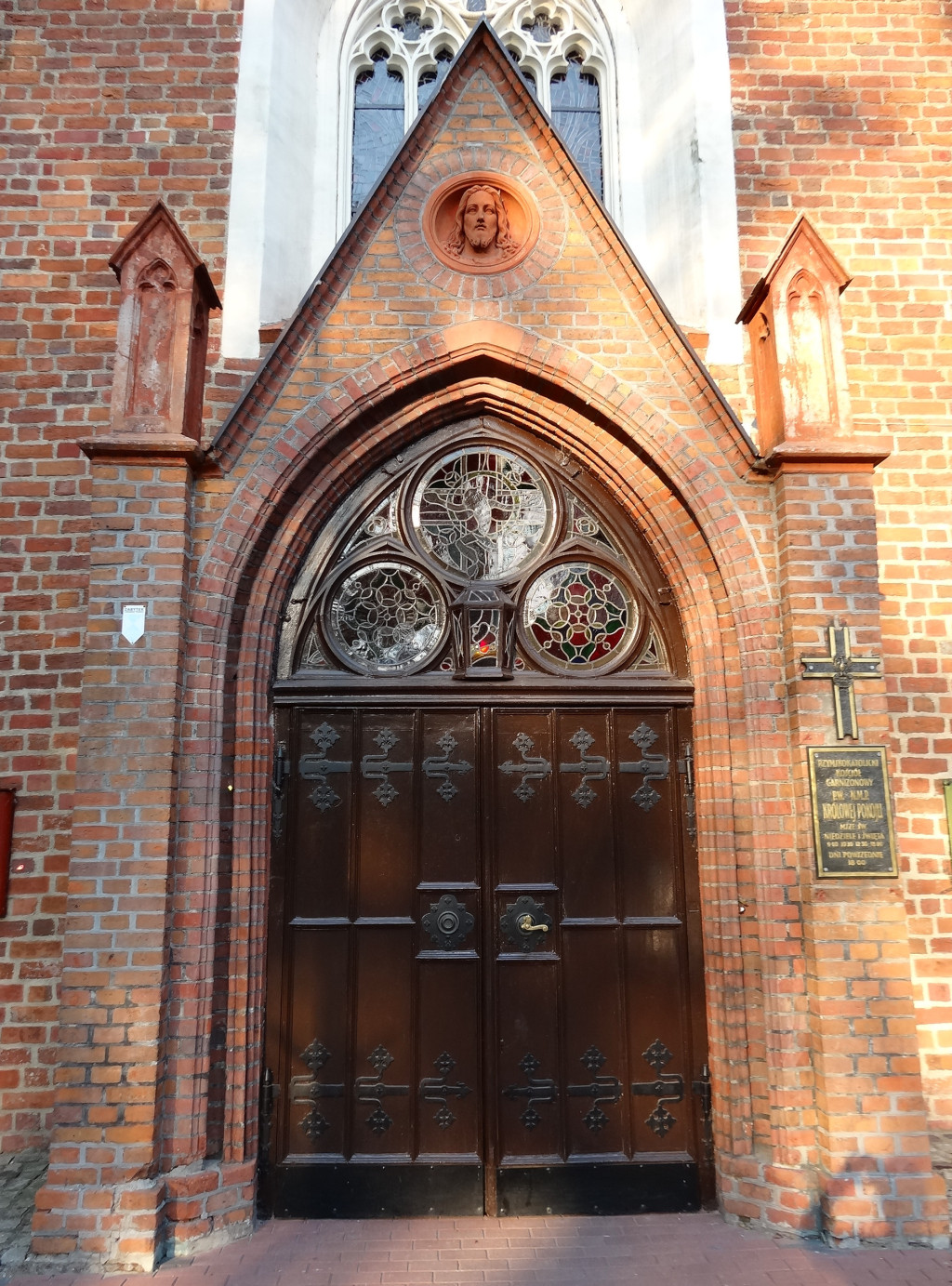
Detail of the portal

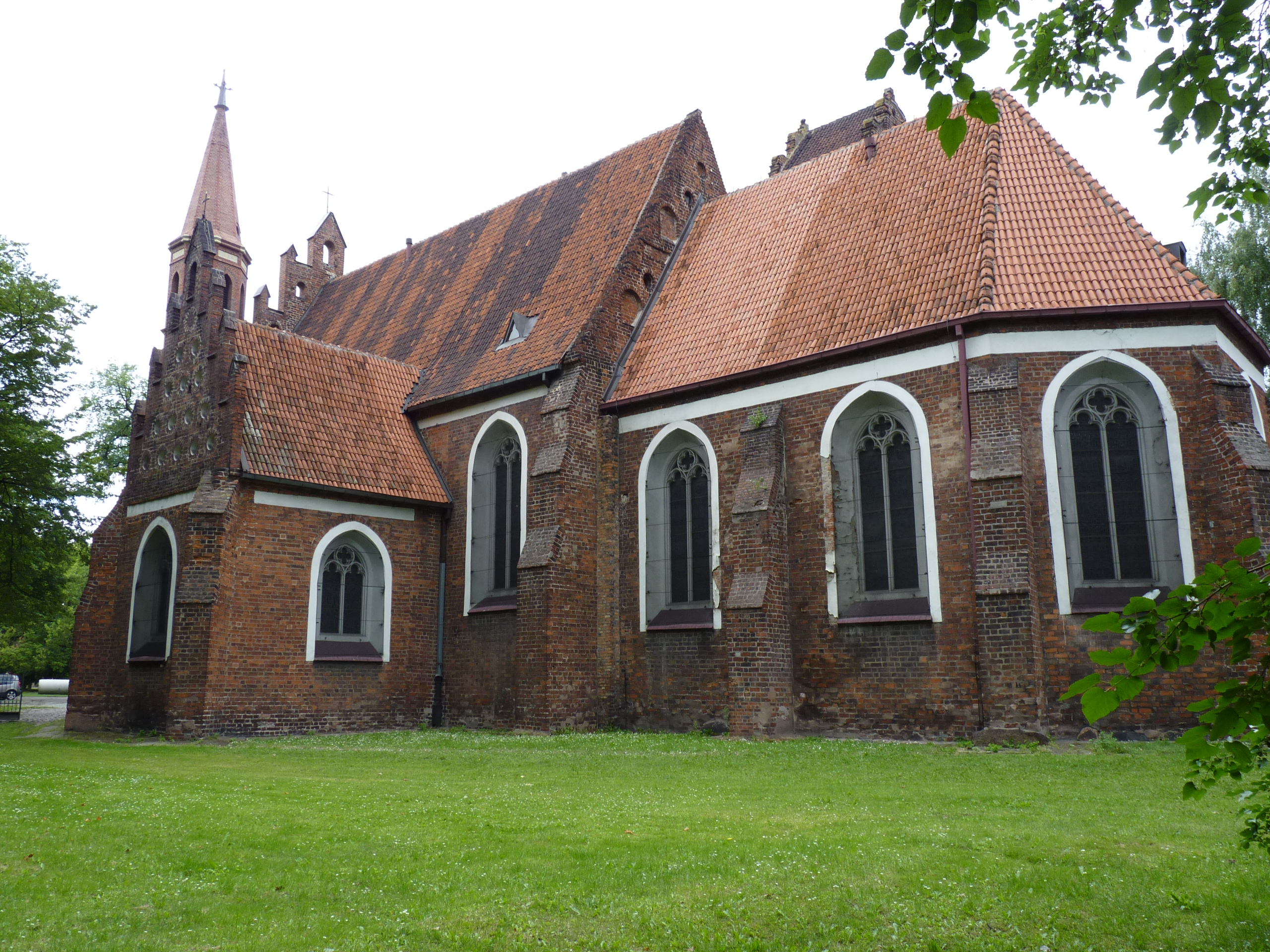
Exteriors-Chancel

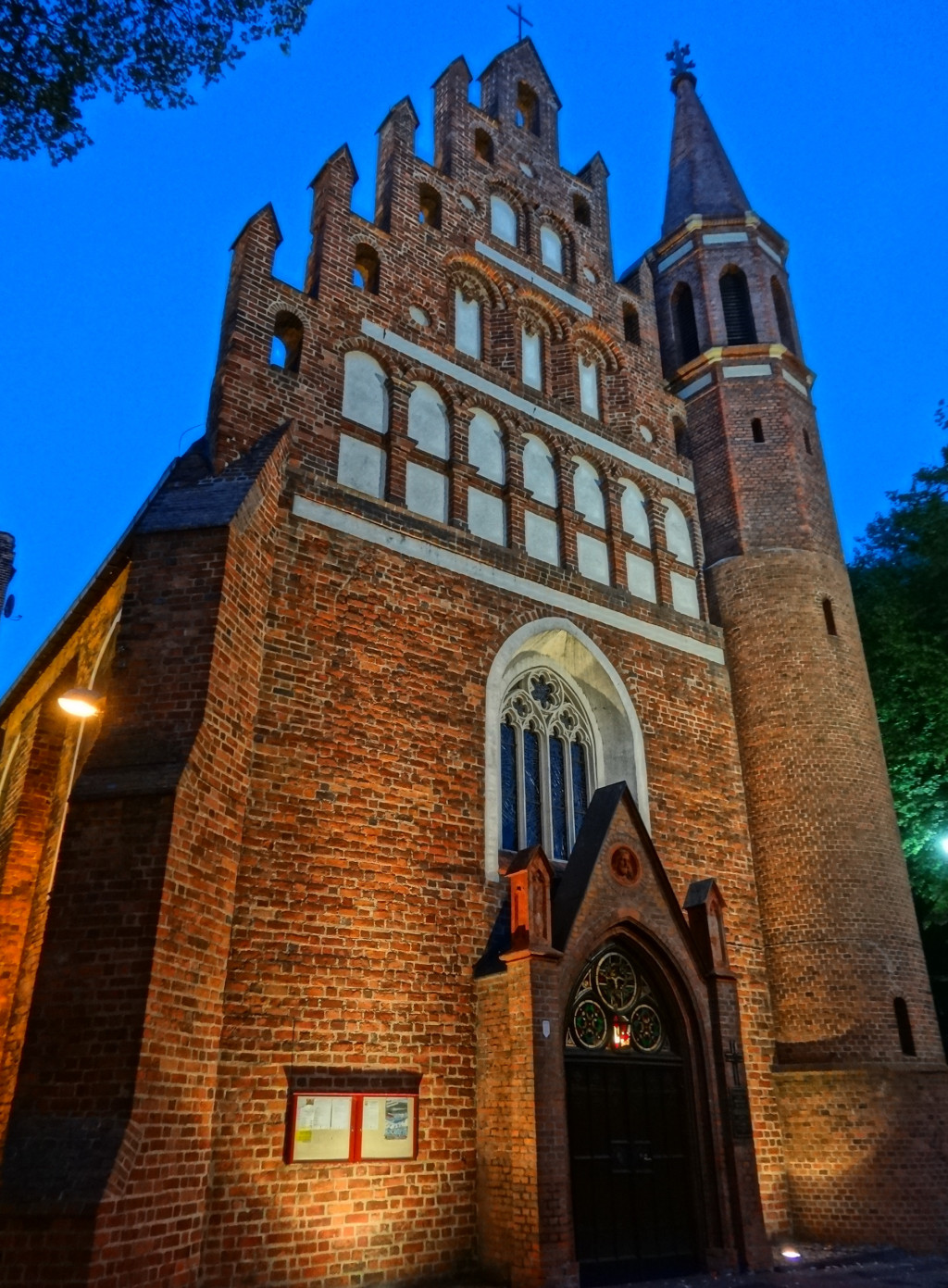
By night

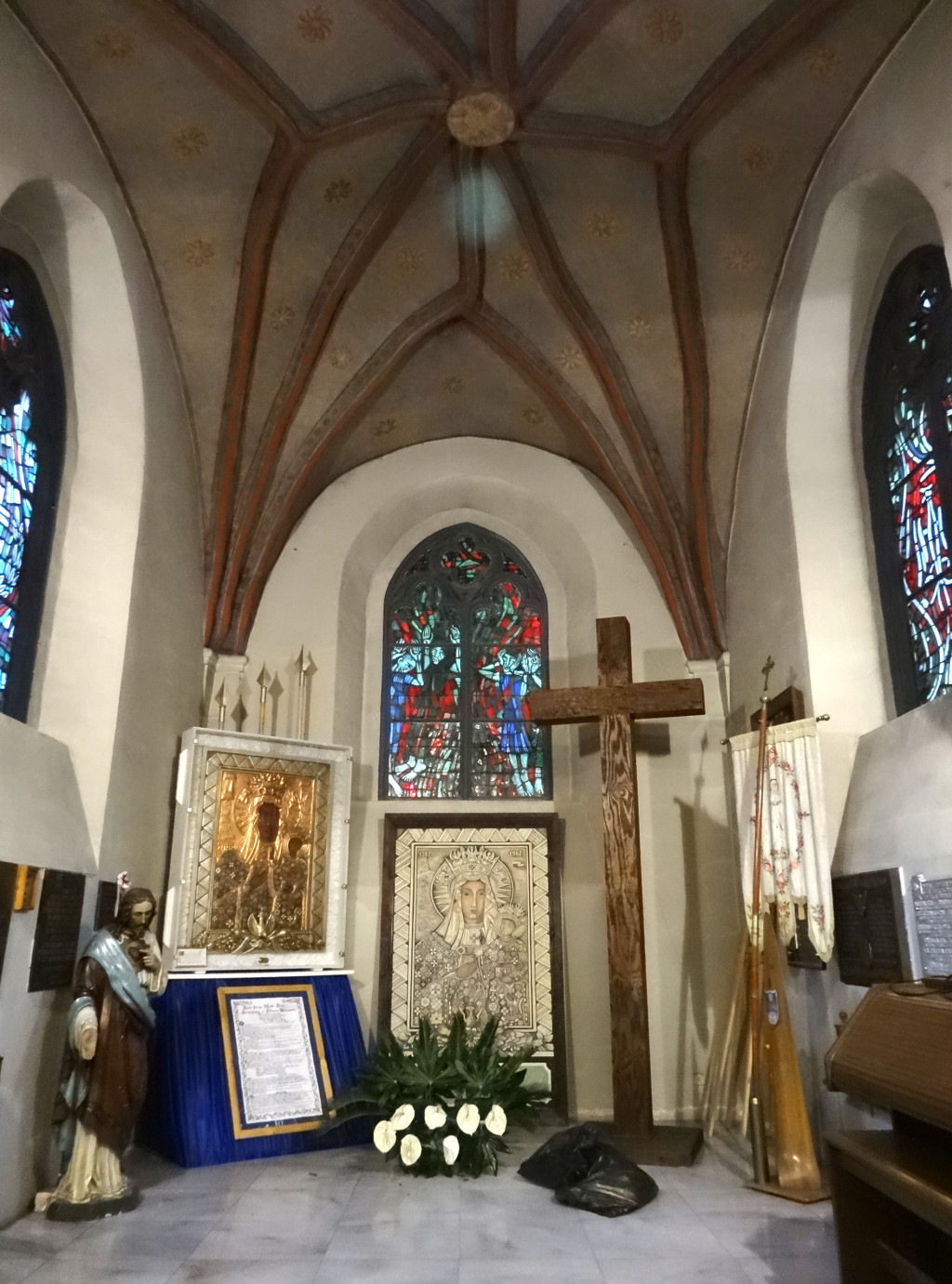
Interiors-Chancel

== See also ==
- Bydgoszcz
- Bernardyńska Street (Bydgoszcz)
- Provincial and Municipal Public Library in Bydgoszcz

== Bibliography ==
- Zajączkowska, Tamara (2001). Tajemnice krypty klasztornej czyli o interesujących odkryciach archeologicznych w kościele garnizonowym pod wezwaniem Najświętszej Marii Panny Królowej Pokoju w Bydgoszczy. Materiały do dziejow kultury i sztuki bydgoszczy i regionu Z.6 (in Polish). Bydgoszcz: Pracownia dokumentacji i popularyzacji zabytków wojewódzkiego ośrodka kultury w Bydgoszczy. pp. 13–20.
- Kuberska, Inga (1998). Architektura sakralna Bydgoszczy w okresie historyzmu. Materiały do dziejów kultury i sztuki Bydgoszczy i regionu. Zeszyt 3 (in Polish). Bydgoszcz: Pracownia dokumentacji i popularyzacji zabytków wojewódzkiego ośrodka kultury w Bydgoszczy. pp. 61–82.
- Iłowski, Zdzisław (2001). Geniusz loci bernardynów bydgoskich. Kalendarz Bydgoski (in Polish). Bydgoszcz: Towarzystwo Miłośników Miasta Bydgoszczy. pp. 131–135.
- Biskup, Marian (1991). Historia Bydgoszczy. Tom I do roku 1920 (in Polish). Warszawa-Poznań: Bydgoskie Towarzystwo Naukowe.
- Derenda, Jerzy (2006). Piękna stara Bydgoszcz – tom I z serii Bydgoszcz miasto na Kujawach (in Polish). Bydgoszcz: Towarzystwo Miłośników Miasta Bydgoszczy.
- Praca zbiorowa pod red. Ks. Hieronima Eug. (1985). Klasztory bernardyńskie w Polsce w jej granicach historycznych (in Polish). Bydgoszcz: Wydawnictwo Bernardynów „Calvarianum”. Kalwaria Zebrzydowska. pp. 35–40.
- Łbik, Lech (1999). Narodziny bydgoskiej parafii, średniowieczne świątynie, parafialny laikat, dekanat. Kronika Bydgoska – tom specjalny wydany z okazji wizyty papieża Jana Pawła II w Bydgoszczy (in Polish). Bydgoszcz: Towarzystwo Miłosnikow Miasta Bydgoszczy - Bydgoskie Towarzystwo Naukowe. pp. 17–49.
