= Bernardyńska Street =

Bernardyńska Street may refer to the following streets in Poland:

- Bernardyńska Street, Bydgoszcz
- Bernardyńska Street, Kraków
- Bernardyńska Street, Tarnów
- Bernardyńska Street, Wrocław
