= Saint Joseph's College =

Saint Joseph's College or Saint Joseph College may refer to:

== Africa ==
- St Joseph's College, Kgale, Botswana
- St. Joseph's College, Sasse, Cameroon
- St Joseph's College, Curepipe, Mauritius
- St Joseph's Marist College, Rondebosch, South Africa

== Asia ==
=== Bangladesh ===
- Saint Joseph Higher Secondary School, Dhaka

=== Lebanon ===
- Collège Saint Joseph – Antoura, Lebanon

=== Hong Kong ===
- St Joseph's College, Hong Kong

=== India ===
- St Joseph's College, Allahabad, India
- St. Joseph's College, Devagiri,
- St. Joseph's College, Irinjalakuda
- St Joseph's College, Bangalore, India
- St Joseph's College of Commerce, Bangalore, India
- St Joseph's College of Law, Bangalore, India
- St Joseph's College, Calcutta, India
- St. Joseph's College of Engineering, Chennai
- St Joseph's College, Darjeeling, India
- St Joseph Engineering College, Vamanjoor, Mangalore, India
- St. Joseph's College, Jakhama, Nagaland
- St Joseph's College, Nainital, India
- St Joseph's College, Tiruchirappalli, India
- St. Joseph University, Chümoukedima, Nagaland

=== Indonesia ===
- Saint Joseph College, Malang, East Java, Indonesia

=== Japan ===
- Saint Joseph College, Yokohama, Japan

=== Pakistan ===
- St Joseph's College, Karachi, Pakistan

=== Philippines ===
- St Joseph's College of Balanga, Balanga City, Philippines
- St Joseph College of Cavite, Cavite City, Philippines
- Saint Joseph College of Maasin, Maasin City, Philippines
- St. Joseph College–Olongapo, Inc., Olongapo City, Philippines
- Saint Joseph's College of Quezon City, Quezon City, Philippines

=== Sri Lanka ===
- St Joseph's College, Bandarawela, Sri Lanka
- Saint Joseph's College, Colombo, Sri Lanka
- St Joseph's College, Trincomalee, Sri Lanka

== Australia ==
- St Joseph's College, Echuca, Victoria
- St Joseph's College, Ferntree Gully, Victoria
- St Joseph's College, Geelong, Victoria
- St Joseph's College, Gregory Terrace, Brisbane, Queensland
- St Joseph's College, Hunters Hill, Sydney
- St Joseph's College, Lochinvar, New South Wales
- St Joseph's College, Melbourne (North Melbourne / Pascoe Vale), Victoria
- St Joseph's College, Nudgee, Brisbane, Queensland
- St Joseph's College, Toowoomba, Queensland
- Saint Joseph's College, Tweed Heads, New South Wales
- St Joseph's Technical College, a former name of St Joseph's Technical School, Abbotsford, Victoria

== Europe ==
=== Ireland ===
- St Joseph's College, Enniskillen, County Fermanagh
- Garbally College, Ireland (formerly known as St Joseph's College, Garbally)
- St Joseph's Patrician College in Galway

=== United Kingdom ===
- St Joseph's College, Belfast, Northern Ireland
- St Joseph's College, Enniskillen, Northern Ireland
- St Joseph's College, Blackpool, now a part of St Mary's Catholic Academy
- St Joseph's College, Coalisland, County Tyrone, Northern Ireland
- St Joseph's College, Dumfries, Scotland
- St Joseph's Catholic College, Bradford, England
- St Joseph's College, Ipswich, England
- St Joseph's College, Reading, England
- St Joseph's College, Stoke-on-Trent, England
- St Joseph's College, Upholland, a former seminary of the Archdiocese of Liverpool, England
- St Joseph's College, Upper Norwood, England

== North America ==
=== Canada ===
- St. Joseph's College, Edmonton
- University of St. Joseph's College, now part of the University of Moncton, New Brunswick
- St. Joseph's College School, an all-girls' high school in Toronto
- Some sources give St. Joseph's College (or Collège Saint-Joseph) as the initial name of the University of Ottawa.

=== United States ===
- St. Joseph's College (Mountain View, California)
- University of Saint Joseph (West Hartford, Connecticut)
- Saint Joseph's College (Rensselaer, Indiana)
- St. Joseph's College (Bardstown, Kentucky), former college which is now home to the Oscar Getz Museum of Whiskey History and the Bardstown Historical Museum
- St. Joseph's College (Iowa), a former name of Loras College
- Saint Joseph's College (Standish, Maine)
- St. Joseph's College (Emmitsburg, Maryland), former college which is now home to the National Emergency Training Center and Emergency Management Institute
- St. Joseph's University (Brooklyn/Patchogue, New York)
- Saint Joseph's University (Merion Station, Pennsylvania), known as Saint Joseph's College prior to 1978
- College of St. Joseph (Rutland, Vermont)
- College of St. Joseph on the Rio Grande (Albuquerque, New Mexico), later renamed University of Albuquerque

== See also ==
- Saint Joseph's (disambiguation)
- St. Joseph's School (disambiguation)
- St. Joseph Seminary (disambiguation)
- Saint Joseph Academy (disambiguation)
