= St. Joseph Seminary =

St. Joseph Seminary can refer to:

== Canada ==
- St. Joseph Seminary (Edmonton)

== East Timor ==
- St. Joseph Seminary, Maliana

== Macau ==
- St. Joseph's Seminary and Church

== Lithuania ==
- Vilnius St. Joseph Seminary

== United Kingdom ==
- St Joseph's College, Mark Cross, former seminary in East Sussex

== United States ==
- St. Joseph Catholic Seminary in Charlotte, North Carolina
- Saint Joseph Seminary College in Covington, Louisiana
- St. Joseph's Seminary and College (Dunwoodie) in Yonkers, New York
- Saint Joseph College Seminary, former seminary in Chicago, Illinois
- St. Joseph's Seminary (Callicoon, New York), former seminary in Callicoon, New York, listed on the National Register of Historic Places
- St. Joseph's College (Santa Clara County, California), former Seminary in Mountain View, California
- St. Joseph's Seminary (Washington, D.C.)

== See also ==
- Saint Joseph (disambiguation)
- Saint Joseph's (disambiguation)
- Saint Joseph's College (disambiguation)
