= St Joseph's Convent =

St Joseph's Convent may refer to:

== Australia ==
- St Josephs Convent, Broken Hill
- St Joseph's Convent, Cairns

== India ==
- St Joseph's Convent High School, Adilabad
- St Joseph's Convent School, Bhopal
- St Joseph's Convent, Chandannagar
- St. Joseph's Convent Girls' Senior Secondary School, Jabalpur
- St Joseph's Convent High School, Mumbai
- St. Joseph's Convent School, Panchgani
- St. Joseph's Convent High School, Patna
- St Joseph's Convent School, Rourkela

== Pakistan ==
- St Joseph's Convent School, Karachi
- St. Joseph's Convent School, Quetta

== Sierra Leone ==
- St. Joseph's Convent (Sierra Leone)

== Saint Lucia ==
- St. Joseph's Convent (Saint Lucia)

== Trinidad and Tobago ==
- St. Joseph's Convent, Port of Spain

== United Kingdom ==
- St Joseph's Convent Grammar School, Donaghmore
- St Joseph's Convent, Reading
- St Joseph's Convent, Salford
- St Joseph's Convent, Taunton

== United States ==
- St. Joseph's Convent and School

== See also ==
- St. Joseph's Church
- St. Joseph's College
- St. Joseph's School
