= St. Joseph's School =

St. Joseph's School, St. Joseph's Catholic School, St Joseph's School, St Joseph's Catholic School, and variants are frequently used school names, and may refer to:

== Africa ==
- St Joseph's School, Addis Ababa, Ethiopia

== Asia ==
- St Joseph's College, Hong Kong
- St. Joseph's Anglo-Chinese School, Hong Kong
- St. Joseph's Institution, Singapore, a secondary school
- CHIJ Saint Joseph's Convent, a secondary school in Sengkang, Singapore
- St Joseph's High School, Timor-Leste
- Lycée Saint-Joseph, Istanbul, Turkey
- St. Joseph Higher Secondary School, Bangladesh

=== India ===
- St Joseph's Boys' High School, Bangalore
- St Joseph's Boys' High School, Pune
- St Joseph's Convent High School, Adilabad
- St Joseph's Convent School, Bhopal
- St Joseph's Convent High School, Mumbai
- St Joseph's Convent, Chandannagar
- St Joseph's Co-Ed School, Bhopal
- St Joseph's Evening College, Bangalore
- St Joseph's Higher Secondary School, Cuddalore
- St. Joseph's High School, Bhubaneswar
- St Joseph's High School, Trimulgherry
- St. Joseph's Higher Secondary School, Baramulla
- St Joseph's Matriculation Higher Secondary School, Coimbatore, Tamil Nadu
- St. Joseph's School, Darjeeling
- St Joseph's School, Fazilnagar
- St. Joseph's Convent High School, Patna
- St Joseph's Convent School, Rourkela

=== Pakistan ===
- St Joseph's English High School, Gujranwala, Punjab
- St Joseph's College, Karachi, Sindh
- St Joseph's Convent School, Karachi, Sindh
- St Joseph's High School, Larkana, Sindh

=== Philippines ===
- St. Joseph College–Olongapo, Olongapo City, Zambales
- Saint Joseph School–La Salle, Bacolod City, Negros Occidental
- St Joseph School of San Jose City, Nueva Ecija (once known as St Joseph School)
- St. Joseph's College of Quezon City, Quezon City, Metro Manila

== Europe ==
=== United Kingdom ===
==== England ====
- St Joseph's Catholic Academy, Hebburn, Tyne and Wear
- St Joseph's Catholic College, Bradford (merged with St Bede's Grammar School to become St Bede's and St Joseph's Catholic College)
- St Joseph's Catholic High School, Slough, Berkshire
- St Joseph's Catholic Primary School, Bromley
- St Joseph's Catholic High School, Workington, Cumbria
- St Joseph's Catholic College, Swindon, Wiltshire
- St Joseph's Catholic School, Laverstock, Wiltshire
- St Joseph's College, Ipswich, Suffolk
- St Joseph's College, Reading, Berkshire, previously known as St Joseph's Convent School
- St Joseph's College, Stoke-on-Trent, Staffordshire
- St Joseph's College, Upper Norwood, London Borough of Croydon
- St Joseph's In The Park, Hertingfordbury, Hertfordshire
- St Joseph's Preparatory School, Stoke-on-Trent, Staffordshire
- St Joseph's RC High School, Horwich, Greater Manchester

=== Others in Europe ===
- Institut Sankt Joseph Copenhagen, Denmark
- St. Joseph's School, Roskilde, Denmark
- St. Joseph's Secondary School, Rush, Ireland

==== Northern Ireland ====
- St Joseph's Boys' High School, Newry, County Armagh
- St Joseph's College, Coalisland, County Tyrone
- St Joseph's Boys' School, Derry
- St Joseph's College, Coleraine, County Londonderry

==== Scotland ====
- St Joseph's College, Dumfries, Dumfries and Galloway

==== Wales ====
- St Joseph's Roman Catholic High School, Newport
- St Joseph's Catholic and Anglican High School, Wrexham

== Americas ==
=== Canada ===
- Collège Saint-Joseph de Hull, a private secondary school for girls in Gatineau, Quebec
- École St. Joseph School, Whitecourt, Alberta
- École St. Joseph School, Yellowknife, Northwest Territories
- St. Joseph's Catholic High School (Grand Prairie), Alberta
- St. Joseph High School (Ottawa), Ontario
- St. Joseph High School (Saskatoon), Saskatchewan
- St. Joseph Secondary School (Mississauga), Ontario
- St. Joseph High School (Edmonton), Alberta
- St. Joseph's Catholic High School (Windsor, Ontario)
- St. Joseph's High School (Barrie), Ontario
- St. Joseph's High School (Renfrew), Ontario
- St. Joseph's High School (St. Thomas, Ontario)
- St. Joseph's College School (Toronto, Ontario)
- St. Joseph's Morrow Park Catholic Secondary School (North York, Ontario)
- Michael Power/St. Joseph High School (Islington, Ontario)
- St. Joseph's Secondary School (Cornwall, Ontario)

=== Trinidad and Tobago ===
- St. Joseph's Convent, Port of Spain

=== United States ===
==== Arkansas ====
- St. Joseph School (Conway, Arkansas)
- St. Joseph Catholic School (Pine Bluff, Arkansas)
- St. Joe High School, St. Joe

==== California ====
- St. Joseph Notre Dame High School, Alameda
- St. Joseph's School (La Puente, California)
- St. Joseph High School (Lakewood, California)
- St. Joseph High School (Santa Maria, California)

==== Colorado ====
- Saint Joseph High School (Denver, Colorado)

==== Connecticut ====
- St. Joseph High School (Connecticut), Trumbull

==== Delaware ====
- St. Joseph's Industrial School, Clayton

==== Florida ====
- St. Joseph Academy (Florida)

==== Hawaii ====
- St. Joseph School (Hilo, Hawaii)

==== Illinois ====
- St. Joseph High School (Westchester, Illinois)

==== Indiana ====
- St. Joseph Indian Normal School, Rensselaer
- St. Joseph High School (South Bend, Indiana),. Joseph County

==== Kansas ====
- St. Joseph's Church and Parochial School, Hays

==== Louisiana ====
- St. Joseph's Academy (Baton Rouge)
- St. Joseph School (Jeanerette, Louisiana)
- St. Joseph School, Opelousas, later known as Holy Ghost High School
- St. Joseph School (Plaucheville, Louisiana)

==== Maine ====
- St. Joseph's School (Biddeford, Maine), Biddeford

==== Maryland ====
- Mount Saint Joseph College, Baltimore

==== Massachusetts ====
- St. Joseph's Convent and School, Lowell
- St. Joseph's School (North Adams, Massachusetts)
- St. Joseph Central High School (Pittsfield, Massachusetts)
- Saint Joseph School (Wakefield, Massachusetts)

==== Michigan ====
- St. Joseph High School (St. Joseph, Michigan)

==== Minnesota ====
- Saint Joseph's Academy (Saint Paul, Minnesota)

==== Mississippi ====
- St. Joseph Catholic School (Madison, Mississippi)

==== Missouri ====
- St. Joseph's Academy (Missouri)

==== New Jersey ====
- St. Joseph's High School (Camden, New Jersey)
- St. Joseph Academy (New Jersey)
- St. Joseph High School (Metuchen, New Jersey)
- Saint Joseph Regional High School, Montvale
- St. Joseph's Roman Catholic Church Rectory and School, Newark
- Saint Joseph of the Palisades High School, West New York

==== New York (state) ====
- St. Joseph High School (Brooklyn)
- St. Joseph's Collegiate Institute, Tonawanda, New York

==== Ohio ====
- Villa Angela-St. Joseph High School, Cleveland
- Saint Joseph Central High School (Ironton, Ohio)
- St. Joseph's Catholic Church (Wapakoneta, Ohio)

==== Pennsylvania ====
- St. Joseph High School (Natrona Heights, Pennsylvania)
- Saint Joseph's Catholic Academy (Boalsburg, Pennsylvania)
- St. Joseph's Preparatory School, Philadelphia

==== South Carolina ====
- St. Joseph's High School (South Carolina) in Greenville

==== South Dakota ====
- St. Joseph's Indian School in Chamberlain

==== Texas ====
- St. Joseph Catholic School (Bryan, Texas)
- St. Joseph High School (Victoria, Texas)

==== Utah ====
- St. Joseph Catholic High School (Ogden, Utah)

==== West Virginia ====
- St. Joseph Central Catholic High School, Huntington

==== Wisconsin ====
- St. Joseph Catholic Academy, Kenosha

=== United States Territories ===
- St. Joseph High School (Virgin Islands), St. Croix, U.S. Virgin Islands

== Oceania ==
=== Australia ===
- Mercedes College, Perth, Western Australia, once known as "St Joseph's School" or "St Joseph's Primary School"

=== New Zealand ===
- St Joseph's School, Wairoa District, Hawke's Bay

=== Papua New Guinea ===
- St Joseph's School, Mabiri, Bougainville Island

== See also ==
- Saint Joseph Academy (disambiguation)
- St. Joseph Central High School (disambiguation)
- Saint Joseph's College (disambiguation)
- Saint Joseph (disambiguation)
- Saint Joseph (for background on the saint)
