= Vaco Baissac =

Mauritian artist (1940–2023)

Vaco Baissac GCSK
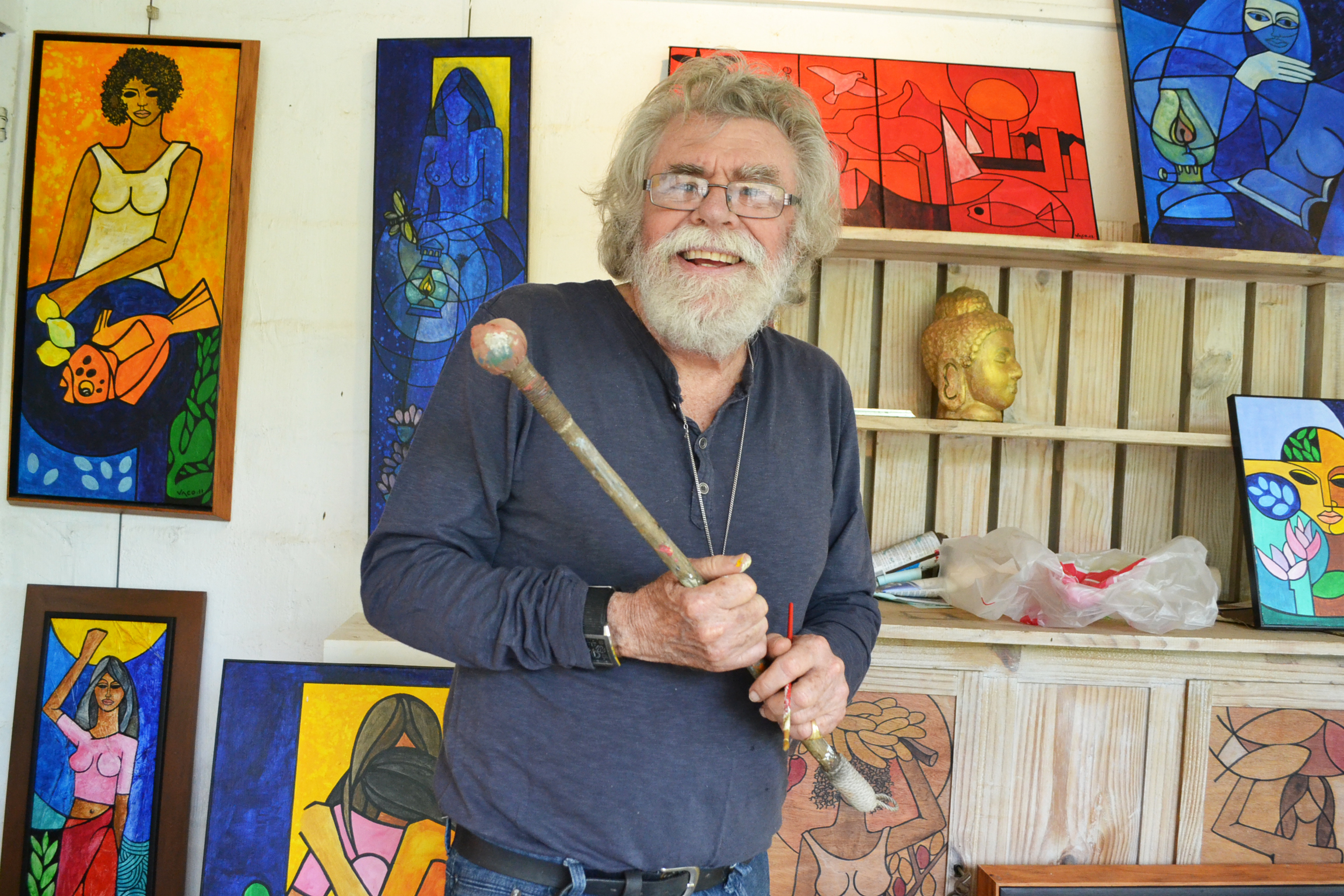
- Vaco in 2013
- Born: 26 October 1940; Curepipe, Mauritius
- Died: 4 February 2023 (aged 82)
- Website: vacoartiste.com

Joseph Charles Jacques Desiré Baissac (26 October 1940 – 4 February 2023), known professionally as Vaco, was a Mauritian artist, best known for his depictions of island life through painting, stained glass, sculpture, jewellery design and ceramics.

Vaco was a defender of the Mauritian Creole language and the idea that all Mauritians can communicate through a common language is integral to the culture of Mauritius, so much so that he said he painted the Creole language and identified as a Creole artist.

== Early life ==
The eldest of four children, Vaco grew up in Curepipe. His father Yves Baissac was the town architect and his brother Jean Claude Baissac was another well known Mauritian artist.

He attended St Joseph's College, Curepipe and was active in the local art and theater scene from his teens. He left Mauritius in 1964 to study art in Paris and Brussels. Then he moved to Southern Africa where he owned and operated a number of restaurants but was still an active artist. He returned to Mauritius in 1990 and became a full time professional artist in 1994.

== Exhibitions and works ==
- 1958 Vaco held his first solo exhibition at the age of 18
- 1960 St. Denis de La Réunion
- 1970 to 1990 Various exhibitions and galleries in Southern Africa
- 1991 First exhibition since returning to Mauritius at Galerie Hélène de Senneville in Grand Baie, Mauritius
- 1992 Salon de St. Leu a La Reunion
- 1993 Salon d’Automne a Paris, France
- 1995 Vaco and his students expose artworks, Port Louis, Mauritius
- 1997 Galerie du Chien de Plomb, Port Louis, Mauritius
- 2001 Exhibits in Brussels and Fribourg
- 2002 Musée Vera in Saint-Germain-en-Laye, Paris
- 2003 ARTE92 in Milan
- 2005 Mahatma Gandhi Institute, Moka, Mauritius
- 2012 VACO expose les Concubines, Réduit, Mauritius
- 2023-2024 – Retrospektiv Vaco (posthumous), Caudan Arts Centre, Ile Maurice

Many visiting dignitaries to Mauritius have received Vaco's artworks including Sepp Blatter, ex head of FIFA, and Pope Francis.

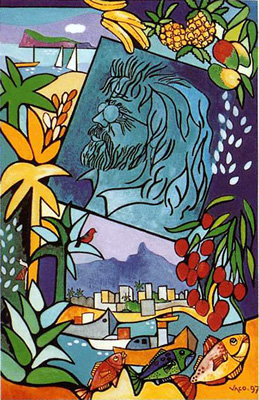

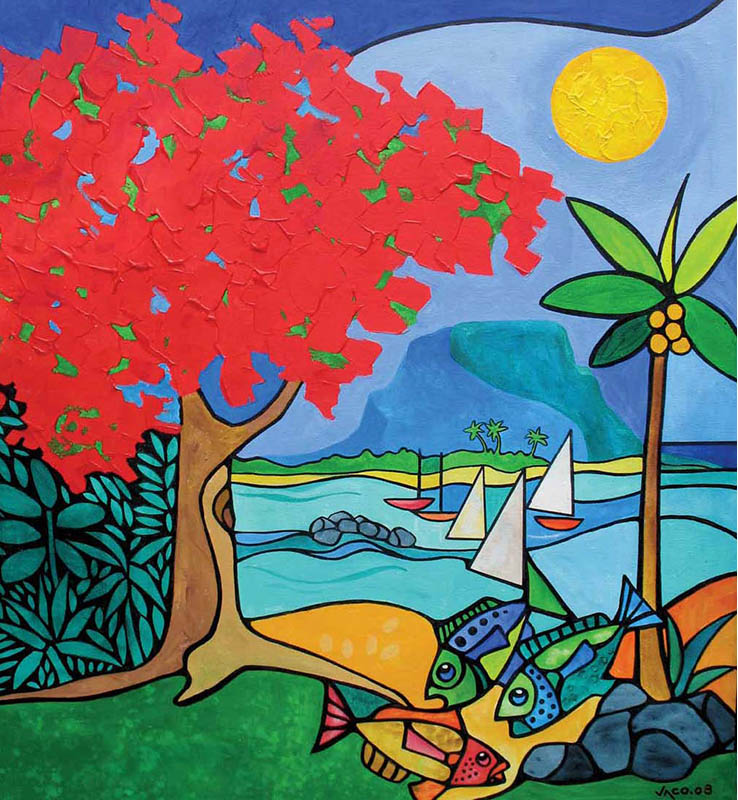

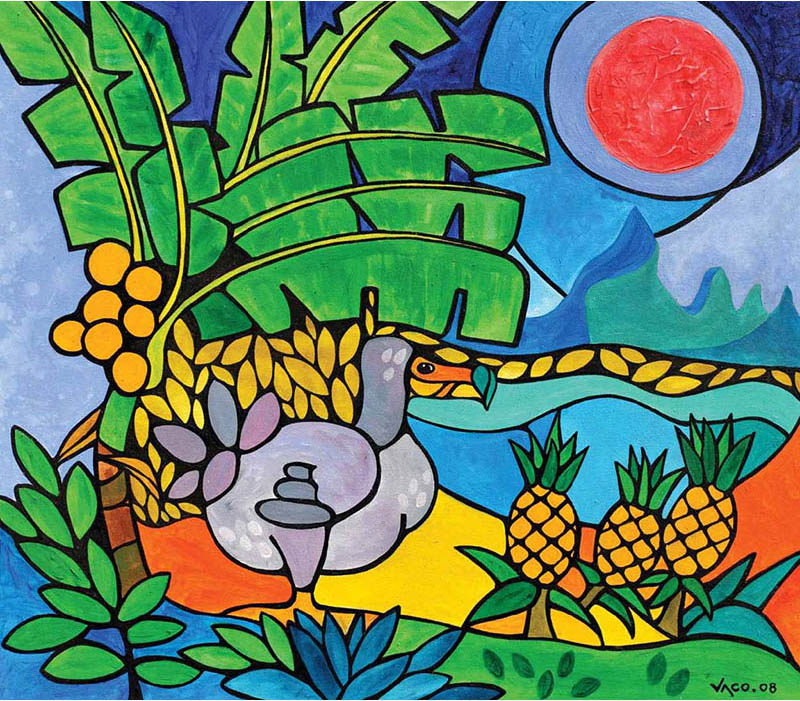

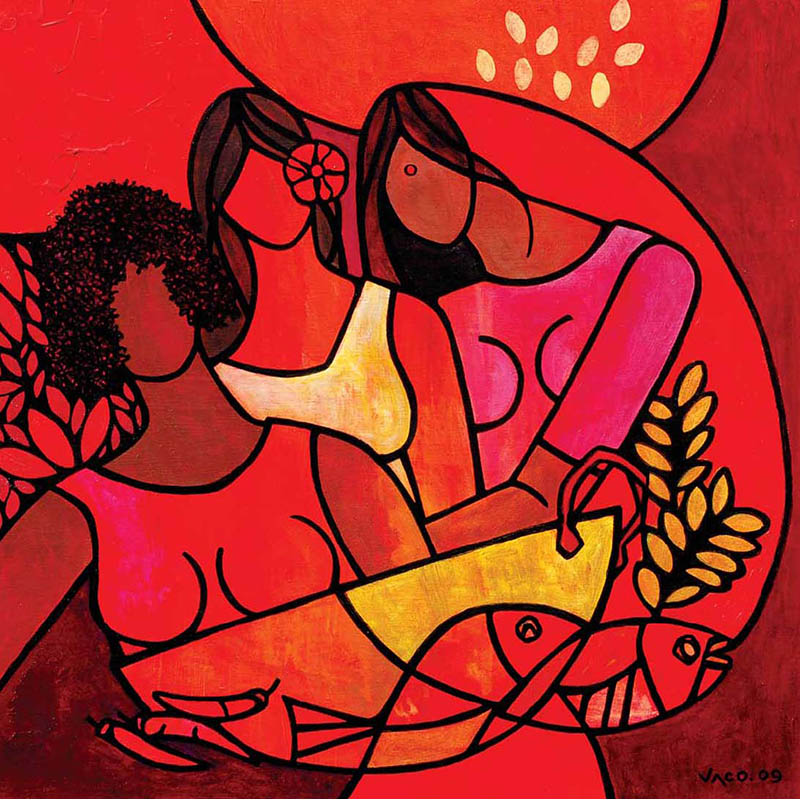

== Awards and decorations ==
- Mauritius:
  - Grand Commander of the Order of the Star and Key of the Indian Ocean (2023)
  - Best Visual Artist, Mauritius National Awards ceremony 2018
