= Saint Joseph's =

Saint Joseph's may refer to:

== Places ==
- St. Joseph's, Newfoundland and Labrador, a Canadian town
- St. Joseph's, Saskatchewan, a Canadian hamlet
- Saint Joseph's Oratory, Montreal, Quebec, Canada

== Education ==
- Saint Joseph's University, Philadelphia, Pennsylvania, United States
  - Saint Joseph's Hawks, the athletic teams at Saint Joseph's University
- St. Joseph's School (disambiguation)
- Saint Joseph's College (disambiguation)
- Saint Joseph Academy (disambiguation)
- Saint Joseph's Institution, a secondary school in Singapore
- Former Saint Joseph's Institution, now a museum in Singapore
- Collège Saint-Joseph de Hull, a private secondary school for girls in Gatineau, Quebec
- St Joseph Higher Secondary School, Dhaka

== Churches ==
- List of churches named after Saint Joseph
- St. Joseph's Cathedral (disambiguation)

== See also ==
- Saint Joseph (disambiguation)
- St. Joseph's Hospital (disambiguation)
- Josephology
- Joseph's Tomb, in the West Bank city of Nablus
