= St. Joseph Central High School =

St. Joseph Central High School may refer to:

- Central High School (St. Joseph, Missouri)
- St. Joseph Central Catholic High School in Huntington, West Virginia
- St. Joseph Central High School (Pittsfield, Massachusetts)
- Saint Joseph Central Catholic High School (Fremont, Ohio)
- Saint Joseph Central High School (Ironton, Ohio)
