= Saint Joseph School (Wakefield, Massachusetts) =

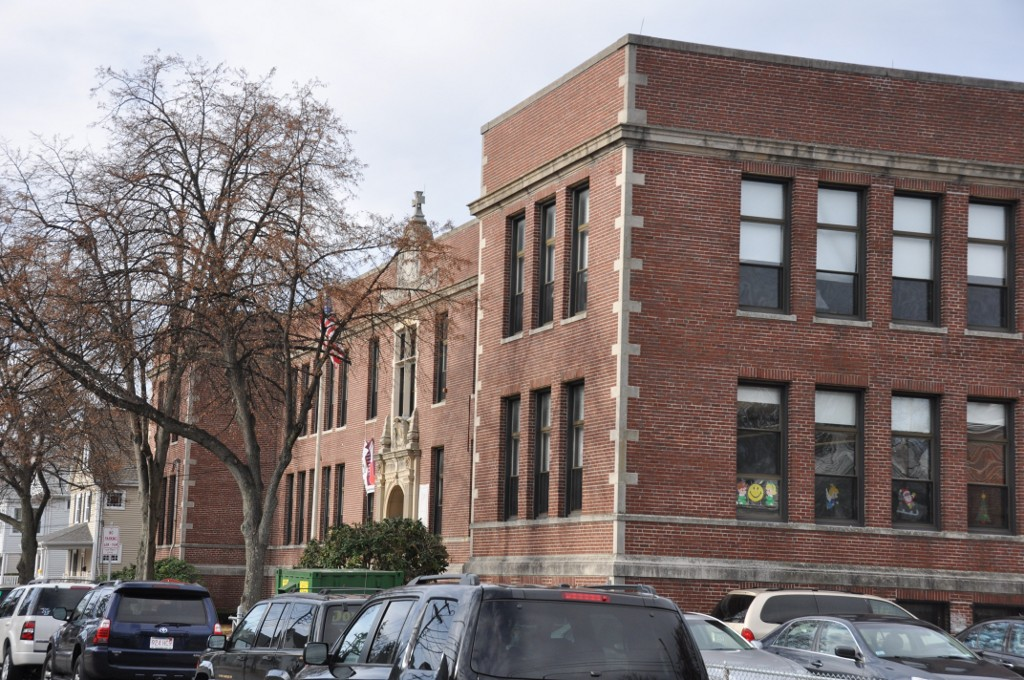

Location
- 15 Gould Street; Wakefield, Massachusetts 01880; United States

Information
- Type: Private
- Religious affiliation: Catholic
- Opened: September 9, 1925
- Grades: Preschool - 8
- Mascot: Hawks
- Accreditation: New England Association of Schools and Colleges (2000)
- Website: http://www.stjosephschoolwakefield.org/

- Saint Joseph School
- U.S. National Register of Historic Places
- Location within Massachusetts Location within the United States
- Location: Gould St., Wakefield, Massachusetts
- Coordinates: 42°30′2″N 71°4′45″W
- Built: 1924
- Architect: Maginnis & Walsh
- Architectural style: Late Gothic Revival, Neo-Gothic
- MPS: Wakefield MRA
- NRHP reference No.: 89000749
- Added to NRHP: July 06, 1989

Saint Joseph School is a private, Catholic school located on Gould Street in Wakefield, Massachusetts. It serves students from preschool to 8th grade.

The two-story Neo-Gothic Revival brick school building was designed by Maginnis & Walsh and was built in 1924. It was added to the National Register of Historic Places in 1989 as a locally rare example of Gothic Revival architecture. The parish for which it was built was established in 1850; the school began with a single grade and was gradually expanded to eight, taught by the Sisters of Saint Joseph.

== See also ==
- National Register of Historic Places listings in Wakefield, Massachusetts
- National Register of Historic Places listings in Middlesex County, Massachusetts
