= St. Joseph Catholic Seminary =

St. Joseph Minor Seminary
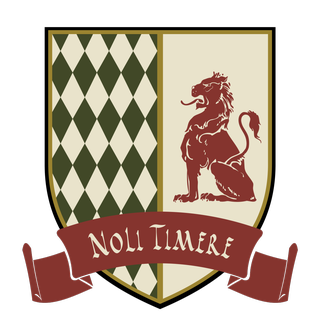

Location
- Belmont, NC
- 35°17′12″N 81°2′46″W

Information
- Type: Seminary
- Motto: Noli Timere (Do not be afraid)
- Religious affiliation: Roman Catholicism
- Patron saint: St. Joseph
- Founded: March 19, 2016
- Sister school: Belmont Abbey College
- Rector: Rev. Matthew Kauth
- Gender: Male
- Age range: 18 to 30
- Enrollment: 26
- Language: English, Latin
- Area: Belmont, NC
- Campus type: Monastery
- Mascot: Lion
- Website: stjcs.org

St. Joseph Seminary is a Roman Catholic diocesan college seminary in Belmont, NC under the jurisdiction of the Diocese of Charlotte. The seminary hosts men exclusively for the Diocese of Charlotte, and is run by priests of that same diocese.

== History ==
The St. Joseph Seminary was created as a result of a rise in vocations in the Diocese of Charlotte. These vocations are attributed primarily to the Quo Vadis Days summer camp, which was instituted in the diocese in 2013. The camp hosts young men from rising high school freshmen to rising college seniors. Traditionally, the diocese has only accepted men with prior college experience, but due to the number of younger vocations coming from the summer camp, the diocese set the seminary in place to be a transition from secular college to seminary formation.

On March 17, 2016, the diocese released a video through their diocesan newspaper, the Catholic News Herald, to explain further details about the proposed seminary, including costs and designs of the building.

The Charlotte Diocese officially announced the creation of this seminary at a youth pilgrimage taking place at Belmont Abbey. This official announcement was formally delivered to at the Diocese's yearly youth pilgrimage by Bishop Peter Jugis, notably on the feast of St. Joseph. He noted in his address the location of the seminary being temporarily on the grounds of St. Ann's Church in Charlotte while a new location was looked into at a later date. In his speech, the bishop also announced the appointment of Rev. Matthew Kauth as the rector of the seminary. The seminary was temporarily on the campus of St. Ann Catholic Church in the St. Joseph Monastery formerly used by the Poor Clares, while a more permanent seminary was built near the campus of Belmont Abbey College in 2020.

With construction being completed, the Fall 2020 semester was the first spent in the new permanent seminary building.

== Studies ==
While in-depth details about the studies the men participate in at this seminary have not been announced, on a general level they work towards a four-year degree in philosophy, in accord with the dogmas of the Church regarding seminary formation. Meanwhile, they will study Latin and Music. This is known as intellectual formation.
