= Saint Joseph's College of Balanga =

Roman Catholic college in Bataan, Philippines

- Kolehiyong San Jose ng Balanga (Filipino)
- Motto: Sapientia, Bonitas, Caritas (Latin)
- Motto in English: Wisdom, Goodness, Charity/Love
- Type: Private, Catholic, Coeducational
- Established: 2006
- Religious affiliation: Roman Catholic (Franciscan Sisters)
- President: Sr. Teresita Cruz Babaran, SFIC
- Principal: Sr. Eterna Manangan, SFIC
- Location: Balanga, Bataan, Philippines; 14°41′30″N 120°30′12″E
- Campus: Urban
- Patron saints: Saint Joseph; Saint Francis of Assisi
- Colors: Maroon, Gold yellow, white
- Location in Luzon Location in the Philippines

St. Joseph's College of Balanga (SJCB) is a Catholic private college located in Balanga, Bataan, Philippines. It is managed by the Franciscan Sisters of the Immaculate Conception.

The college is the third branch of four St. Joseph's Colleges (the other three are from E. Rodriguez Blvd, Quezon City; Mactan, Cebu and Toril, in Davao City).

== History ==
St. Joseph's College was founded by then Most Reverend Bishop Socrates B. Villegas, DD when he was the third bishop of the Roman Catholic Diocese of Balanga (now the Archbishop of the Archdiocese of Lingayen-Dagupan) in 2006 with then SFIC Provincial Superior Sr. Josephini P. Ambatali, SFIC. It is the first Catholic school in Balanga.

The school pioneers were Sr. Teresita C. Babaran as Directress, Sr. Agnes Labitoria as Principal, Sr. Annalisa Cabrera as Guidance Counselor, Sr. Josefina Miguel as Health Officer, Sr. Lolita Oria as Canteen manager, Sr. Redempta Navalta as sewing room manager and Sr. Jocelyn Sulse as bookkeeper. Almost all the Sisters taught CFP. There were 78 enrolled students from Kindergarten up to College during its first schoolyear in 2006-2007.

== Degree programs ==
- Bachelor of Arts
  - Philosophy, the first ever course offered in the province
  - Psychology
- Bachelor of Science
  - Secondary & Elementary Education (with major in special education, values education and mathematics)
  - Social Work
