= Saint Joseph's School, Malang =

St Joseph College
- SMA Katolik Kolese Santo Yusup; 印高中 / 華印高中
- Crest of Kolese Santo Yusup

Location
- East Java; Malang; Indonesia; 7.94019°S 112.63976°E

Information
- Type: Private
- Motto: Tetap Bersemangat (Fervent in Spirit)
- Established: 4 January 1954
- Principal: Kornelius Kristian
- Campus type: Urban
- Website: smakkosayu.sch.id

Saint Joseph College (Kolese Santo Yusup (abb. KOSAYU) or Hwa Ind in Tionghua Indonesia) is a privately owned Catholic school in Malang, East Java, Indonesia. They enroll students starting from kindergarten through year 12.

== History ==
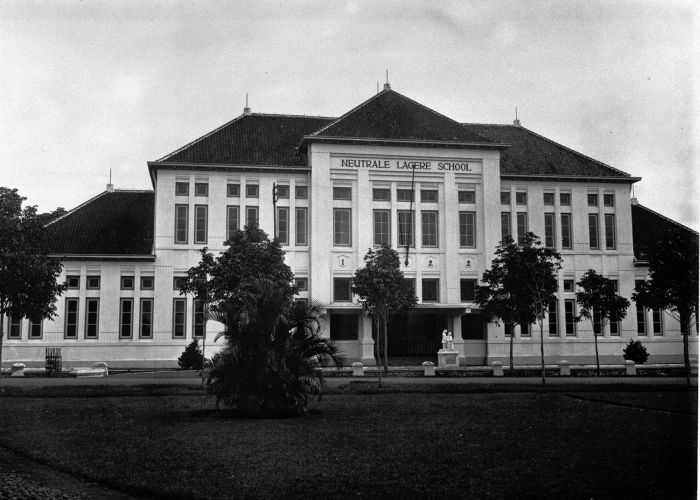
Neutrale Lagere School (ca.1930), the building purchased by Father Wang in 1951

On 16 January 1951, Father Joseph Wang, CDD was ordered by the bishop of Malang to develop a Catholic school for the Chinese students who, at the time, were learning in a Chinese school. Father Joseph Wang, called simply Father Wang, was a priest from the Congregation of the Lord's Disciples (CDD: Congregatio Discipulorum Domini).

He purchased a run-down building, previously the Dutch Neutrale Lagere School, on a land with an area of 5000m². The property is situated at 35 Dr. Soetomo Street, Malang. On 15 July 1951, the school unofficially opened under the name Roman Catholic Indonesian Chinese Secondary School (SM-RK Hwa Ind: Sekolah Menengah Roma Katolik Tionghua Indonesia). Two days later, the school began its first lessons to four students. The official opening of the school was carried out by Monsignor AEJ. Albers, O. Carm. on 19 March 1952; this is the date used as the school's anniversary.

On 4 January 1954, Father Wang opened one class for senior high school students with an enrolment of 27 students. On 1 December 1959, the school's name was changed to Saint Joseph College. On 1 September 1974, another campus was opened in the Blimbing area for the senior high school students. The school was named Saint Joseph Senior High School (SMAK Kolese Santo Yusup). At the time there were nine classes, but this has since increased to 29 classes for the senior high school students.

== Campus ==
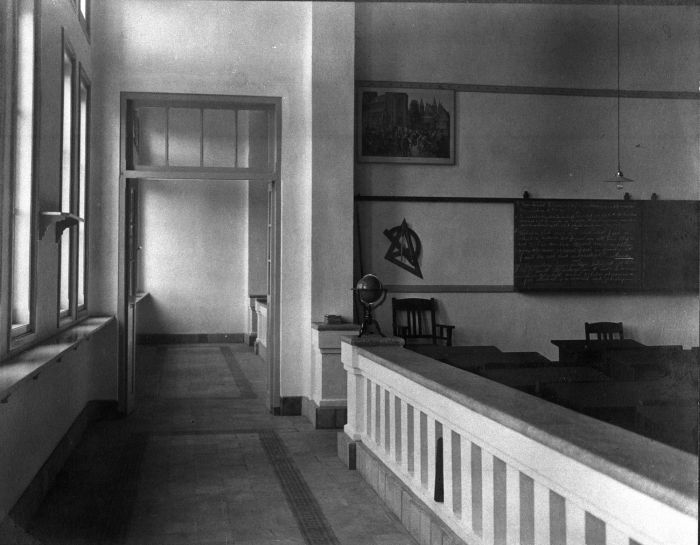
The interior of Neutrale Lagere School (circa 1922-1930), which has largely remained unchanged. It is now the Soetomo campus of St. Joseph College. The desks and blackboards pictured are still being used today.

Saint Joseph statue

Saint Joseph College is divided into two campuses, the Soetomo campus (situated at Jalan Dr. Soetomo number 35, Malang) and the Blimbing campus (situated at Jalan Simpang Borobudur number 1, Malang). The Soetomo campus enrolls students from the kindergarten to the junior high level while the Blimbing campus enrolls students from the elementary to the senior high level.

=== Saint Joseph College Soetomo Campus ===
The principal of Saint Joseph College Junior High School I (Soetomo) is Maria Monica Tjong Mei Tjien, with the vice principal, Irma Susanti. The principal before that is Lindung Ratwiawan, along with the same vice principal, Irma Susanti.

=== Saint Joseph College Blimbing Campus ===
Past and current principals of Saint Joseph College Senior High School are:

- Father Joseph Wang, CDD (1954 - 1973)
- G. Soewandi (1974 - 1984)
- Father Hilarius Sutiono, CDD (1984 - 2004)
- Peter Bento Sihombing (2004 - 2014)
- Petrus Harjanto (2014 – 2026)
- Kornelius Kristian (2026-present)

== Facilities ==
Administrative office area

Chapel

Greenhouse

== Alumni ==
- Murdaya Poo, Entrepreneur
- William Wongso, Indonesian Culinary Expert

== See also ==
- Saint Joseph
