= St Joseph's College, Lochinvar =

School in New South Wales, Australia

Location
- New England Highway, Lochinvar, New South Wales; Australia
- Coordinates: 32°41′55″S 151°27′25″E

Information
- Former name: All Saints’ College (1992–2018)
- Type: Independent co-educational secondary day school
- Motto: Latin: Vigor in Ardius Crescat (May your strength increase in difficulties)
- Religious affiliations: Sisters of St Joseph of the Sacred Heart; Diocese of Maitland
- Denomination: Roman Catholicism
- Patron saint: Saint Joseph
- Established: 1883; 143 years ago
- Educational authority: New South Wales Department of Education
- Principal: Patricia Hales
- Years: 7–12
- Enrolment: 705
- Website: lochinvarsj.catholic.edu.au

St Joseph's College, Lochinvar is an independent Roman Catholic co-educational secondary day school, located in the village of Lochinvar, in the Hunter Valley of New South Wales, Australia.

Established in 1883 by the Sisters of St Joseph of the Sacred Heart, founded by Father Julian Tenison-Woods, the College caters for approximately 700 students from Year 7 to Year 12. In 1990, St Joseph's College merged with Catholic secondary schools in the area, St Peter's and St Mary's in nearby Maitland, to form All Saints' College. In 2018, St Joseph's College de-merged and expanded its educational offering to cater for students in Year 11 and Year 12. 2019 was the first year in which students commenced the NSW Higher School Certificate.

The College motto is the phrase in Latin: Vigor in Ardius Crescat, which translates as "May your strength increase in difficulties".

== See also ==
- All Saints College, Maitland
- List of Catholic schools in New South Wales
- Catholic education in Australia
