= St Joseph's College, Toowoomba =

Coordinates: 27°34′19.7″S 151°58′14″E

St Joseph's College is located at 54 James Street, Rangeville, Toowoomba, Queensland, Australia. The school was founded by the Irish Christian Brothers as an all-boys school in 1956. The school, off James Street, is no longer administered by the Christian Brothers. The school motto is to "Serve Him In Others", meaning to serve God in others. As of 2018, There are currently around 840 students enrolled at the college.

== History ==
In 1955, Vince Crowley called a meeting to explore the possibility of beginning a Catholic Boys' school on the eastern side of Toowoomba to "eliminate the need for the boys on the eastern side of town to ride their bikes, sometimes dangerously, to St Mary’s College".

In July plans were drawn up for the college site surrounded by Mackenzie, James and Curzon Streets. Bishop Brennan (then Bishop of the Toowoomba Diocese) approached the Christian Brothers to establish a Community at St Joseph’s. Three brothers were appointed to the St Joseph's community in October.

On the first day of the new college in 1956, 116 boys were enrolled. However, the "students had to commence the school year in buildings located behind St Patrick’s Cathedral because the buildings at the current site for the College were not ready. The College, on its current site, was officially opened by Archbishop Duhig of Brisbane and Bishop Brennan of Toowoomba in a ceremony on 2 September 1956. The College was to be for boys for Grades IV to Senior (Years 4–12).

On 22 June 1982, it was announced that the Christian Brothers would be withdrawing from the College at the end of 1983. In 1982 the College catered for 314 boys from Years 4–10. Those students who wanted to continue their schooling for years 11 and 12 had to go elsewhere (generally to St Mary’s College or Downlands College).

In 1982 it was also decided that other changes would occur from 1983. The College would be extended to include the Senior years, Years 11 & 12, and the Primary section would gradually be phased out. The College would also become co-educational. 1983 saw the first girls enrolled in Year 8. 1985 saw the last of the Primary classes.

In 2015, on 27 January, St. Joseph's extended its education to include Year 7 students, making it par with New South Wales high schools.

In 2017, came the replacement of, now-former, Principal Welsh with Principal Nicholas Lynch.

In 2020, Principal Lynch was replaced with a now new Principal, Mr Kort Goodman.

In 2024, Principal Goodman was replaced with another new principal, Mr Jim Brennan.
