= St. Joseph College of Cavite =

Roman Catholic college in Cavite, Philippines

- Dalubhasaang San Jose ng Kabite (Filipino)
- Former names: St. Joseph Institute; St. Joseph College - Cavite City
- Motto: Patria Virtus Scientia
- Type: Private university
- Established: July 2, 1945
- Affiliations: PAASCU, CEAP, FAPE, CICAPSA, ARSC
- Religious affiliation: Roman Catholic, Augustinian Recollect Sisters
- Location: Cavite City, Philippines; 14°28′44.47″N 120°54′3.98″E
- Hymn: We Are Thy Loyal Children
- Colors: Green and Gold
- Nickname: St. Jo
- Website: www.sjccavite.org
- Location in Luzon Location in the Philippines

St Joseph College of Cavite, Inc. is a Roman Catholic learning institution located in San Roque, Cavite City, Philippines. It was established in 1945 and is run by the Augustinian Recollect Sisters. The first opening of classes was on July 2, 1945. The first school building was then known as the St. Joseph Institute, and in 1947, it was renamed to St. Joseph College. Today, St. Joseph College of Cavite, Inc. offers education from Preschool to Graduate School.

== History ==
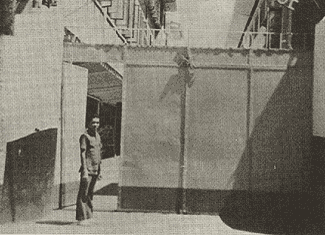
The old gate of St. Joseph College

During the early post liberation days of 1945, the late Msgr. Pedro Lerena was the parish priest of San Roque Church in Cavite City. He looked for an opportunity to propose his plan to the Very Reverend Mother Rosario Rosales, then Superior General of the Congregation of the Augustinian Recollect Sisters, of having a Catholic school in the City of Cavite.

The Superior General of the Congregation of the Augustinian Recollect Sisters sent the very first group of Sisters: Sr., as the Superior-Principal, Sr. Caridad Salazar and Sr. Margarita Ponce, as her companion. They were led by Sr. Ma. Celina Magcauas as their local community superior.

The sisters rented an old two-story house on a lot directly across the street at the back entrance of the San Roque Parish Church and near the sea in a quite residential section of the city. On July 2, 1945, classes were opened and this became the first school building and known as the Saint Joseph Institute. Inauguration was made in the presence of Very Reverend Mother General Rosario Rosales and a group of Sisters.

From its humble beginnings as the St. Joseph Institute, it was renamed St. Joseph College in 1947. The Augustinian Recollect Sisters take turns in managing the school. The school’s expansion in buildings and program offerings is in response to the needs and aspirations of the people in the community. An additional baccalaureate program was added at a time when hotels and restaurants were beginning to operate in the suburbs as a result of expatriates moving into the province due to the opening and development of an export processing zone in the nearby town of Rosario.

The school administrators have initiated several innovations; one of which is the construction of a mock hotel that will house the HRM students for their practicum.

A building for the grade school department was also built after the construction of the simulation hotel. Apart from that, the school has already managed to have the school chapel renovated and all the classrooms air conditioned. Additional laboratory materials were also purchased for the various laboratories of the high school and college, while the Skills Laboratory of the Institute of Health Sciences has been upgraded to keep up with the demands of the nursing program. The Learning Resource Center or the library is continuously acquiring newly published books to help students in their assignments and requirements. Computers with internet access have also been provided to all laboratories and offices.

St. Joseph College is currently offering Preparatory Education, Elementary, High School, Bachelor of Science in Nursing, Diploma in Midwifery, Bachelor of Elementary Education, Bachelor of Secondary Education (Major in Science, Mathematics, and English), and Bachelor of Science in Hotel and Restaurant Management. It also has a Master of Arts in Education and Master of Arts in Nursing program offerings.

The Basic Education, Elementary and High School, is PAASCU Level I accredited; while the College of Education and HRM and the Institute of Health Sciences are in the process of accreditation.

== Alma Mater Hymn ==
We are thy loyal children
St. Joseph College dear
All praise to thee Oh Alma Mater
Hear our voices clear
Thy name is gold within our hearts
We carry day by day
Shall stay unstained forever dear
’till we all turn to clay.
All the bells’ ringing tell
Music from our heart’s core
All praise to thee honor and glory be
This is the song we sing so free!(2x)

== Academic programs ==
=== Basic education ===
- Preschool (Pre-K to Kindergarten)
- Grade School (Grades 1 to 6)
- High School (Grades 7 to 10)
- Senior High School (Grade 11 to 12)

=== Undergraduate programs ===
- Bachelor of Elementary Education (BEEd)
- Bachelor of Secondary Education (BSEd) Major in English
- Bachelor of Secondary Education (BSEd) Major in Math
- Bachelor of Secondary Education (BSEd) Major in Science
- Bachelor of Science in Hotel and Restaurant Management (BSHRM)
- Bachelor of Science in Nursing (BSN)
- Diploma in Midwifery

=== Graduate programs ===
- Master of Arts in Education (M.A.Ed.) major in Educational Management
- Master of Arts in Nursing (M.A.N.) major in Nursing Administration

== The Old St. Joseph College ==
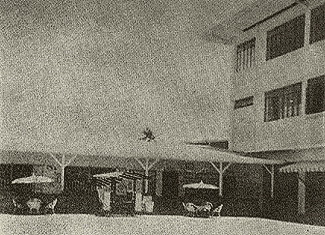
The Old Canteen

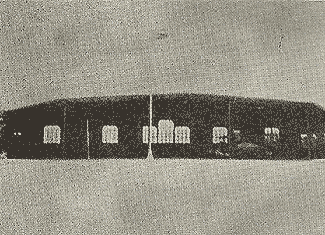
The old gym

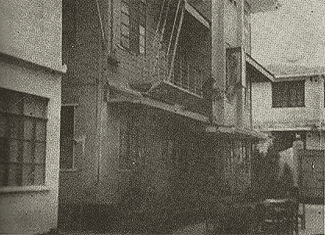
Old Building Left

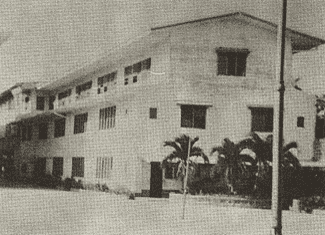
Old building rear

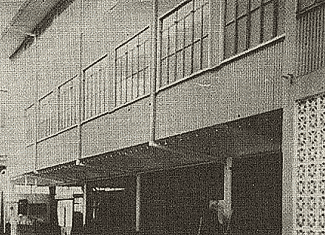
Old Building Right
