= St Joseph's College, Bandarawela =

St. Joseph's College
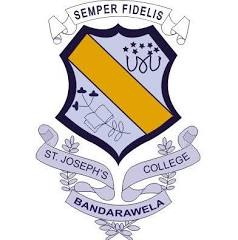
- School Crest

Location
- Badulla Road; Bandarawela; Bandarawela, Uva, 90100; Sri Lanka; 6.828757°N 80.995014°E

Information
- Type: National school
- Motto: Semper Fidelis
- Religious affiliation: Christianity
- Denomination: Roman Catholic
- Patron saint: St. Joseph
- Established: February 1, 1909
- Founder: Rev. Brother Simon Mathew
- Sister school: Little Flower Convent Bandarawela
- Educational authority: Sri Lanka Education Department
- Headmaster: S.K.Samaranayake
- Staff: 126
- Teaching staff: 110
- Grades: Class 1-13
- Gender: Male
- Age range: 5 to 19
- Enrollment: 3,000
- Education system: National Education System
- Language: English, Sinhala, Tamil
- Colours: Blue and gold
- Song: Forward we go ahead
- Athletics: Yes
- Sports: Yes
- Publication: College Magazine Josephian (since 1920)
- Affiliations: De La Salle Brothers; Marist Brothers; Little Flower Convent Bandarawela
- Alumni: Old Josephians
- Alumni name: Old Boys Union of St.Joseph's College Bandarawela
- Website: www.bdstjosephs.sch.lk

St. Joseph's College is a 1AB national school located in Bandarawela, Uva, Sri Lanka.Founded in 1909 by the De La Salle Brothers, A Roman Catholic Missionary Congregation, It was later administered by the Marist Brothers in 1915 and was vasted in Government in 1961.It is also known as Bandarawela St. Joseph's National School. Established in 1909, the school provides primary and secondary education to students in the Badulla District.

The campus occupies 2.0 hectares (5 acres) on a section of Badulla Road which is part of the A16 highway.

== History ==
In 1909, St. Joseph's School was established by the De La Salle Brothers. Seventeen boys were admitted on the first day. The first Rector (principal) was an Irishman, Patrick Purchell, known as Brother Simon Mathew. However, the land on which the school was situated was sold in 1914.

The land was repurchased in 1928 by the Marist Brothers. In this second stage, the first Rector (principal) was known as the Reverend Brother Lewis. By the time of his departure in 1934, there were 250 students.

Before 1961, this college was run by the De La Salle Brothers and the Marist Brothers. The Brother in charge of the college was called the Rector. After the government takeover, the title changed to Headmaster and Principal.

St. Joseph's remained a private school until 1961, when it became a government school. The first principal under the new system was Arthur Deegalle.

In 1974, the primary section was added and girls were admitted, making it a mixed school. In 1981, the school was recognised as a National School by the Ministry of Education, and it was graded a 1 AB school in 1999.

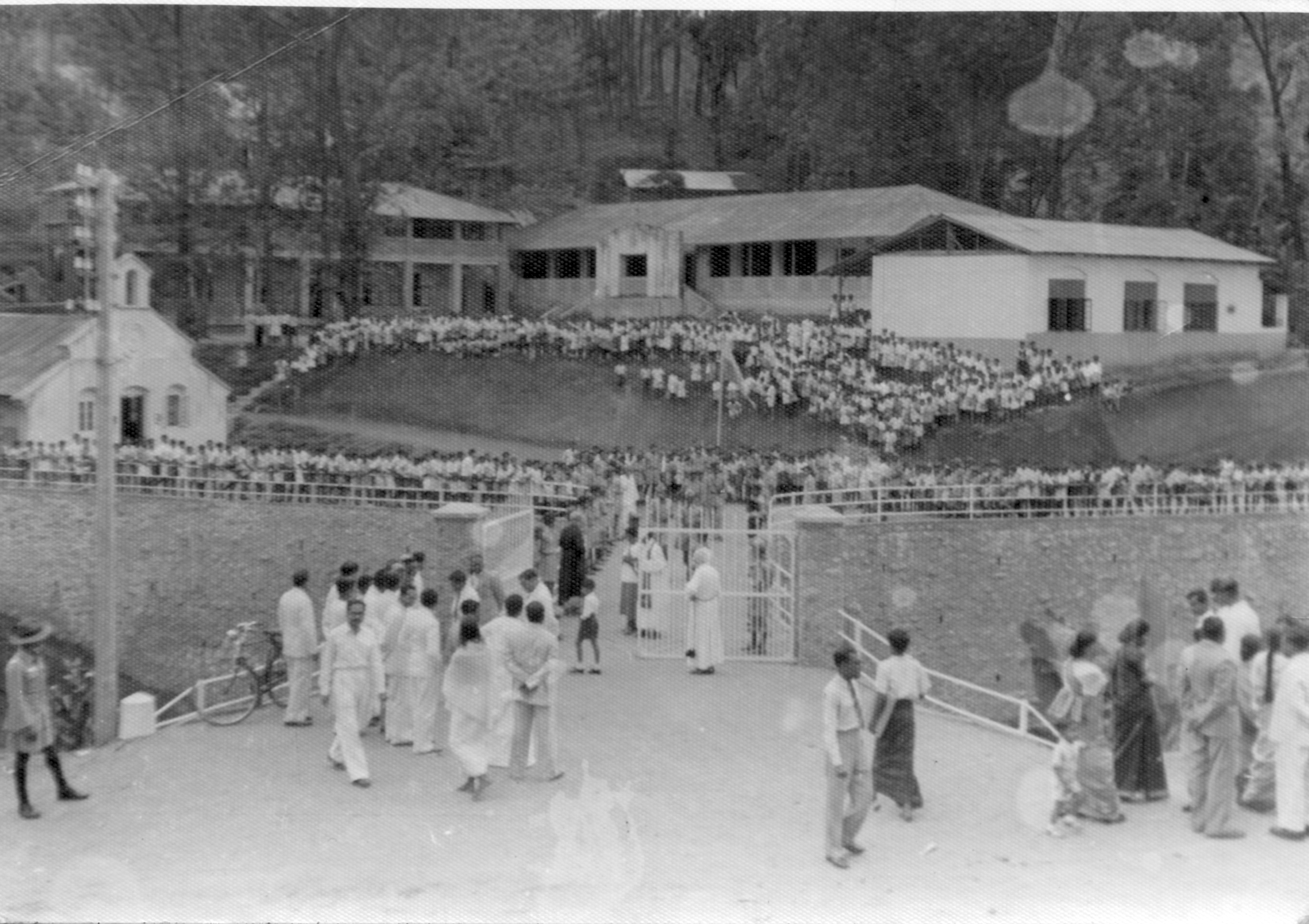
Old picture of the campus

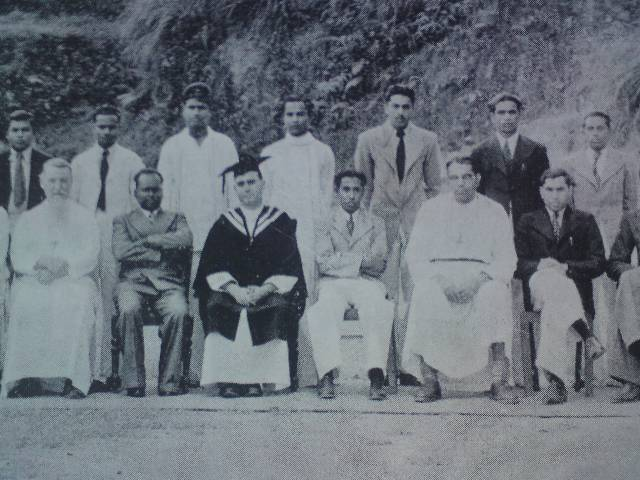
Old photograph of staff

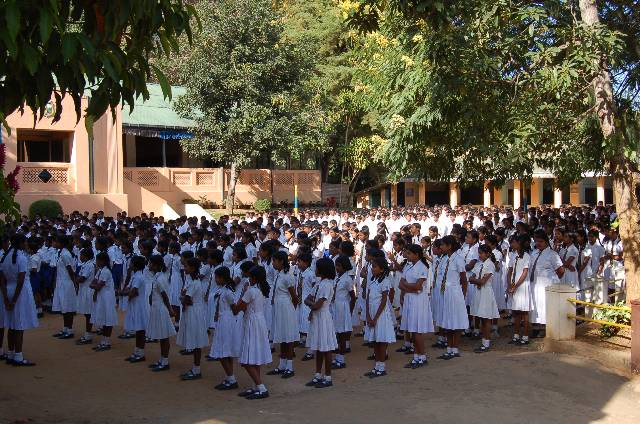
Present morning assembly

== Administration ==
The Headmaster is the head of the administration of the college and is assisted by a deputy headmaster.

The school is divided into three sections: the primary school (the former St. Joseph's College Preparatory School), middle school and the upper school, each coming under a deputy headmaster.

In addition, Sectional Heads and Academic Coordinators are appointed for all sections from Grade 6 to 13.

The college has also appointed a Discipline Master, English Master, Cadet Master, Band Master, Sports Master, Scout Master, and Prefect of Games (POG).

The non-academic staff ( minor staff ) of the college includes Clerks, a Store Keeper, Laboratory Assistants, Peons, Watchers, Gardeners, Sanitary Labourers, and Drivers.

The college educates close to 3,000 students.

== Activities ==
=== Houses ===
St. Joseph's College assigns its students to one of four houses to encourage cooperation and friendly competition:

- Blue House
- Gold House
- Green House
- Maroon House

Annually, the college organizes inter-house athletic games to improve the athletic skills of the students as well as their team spirit.

=== Sports ===
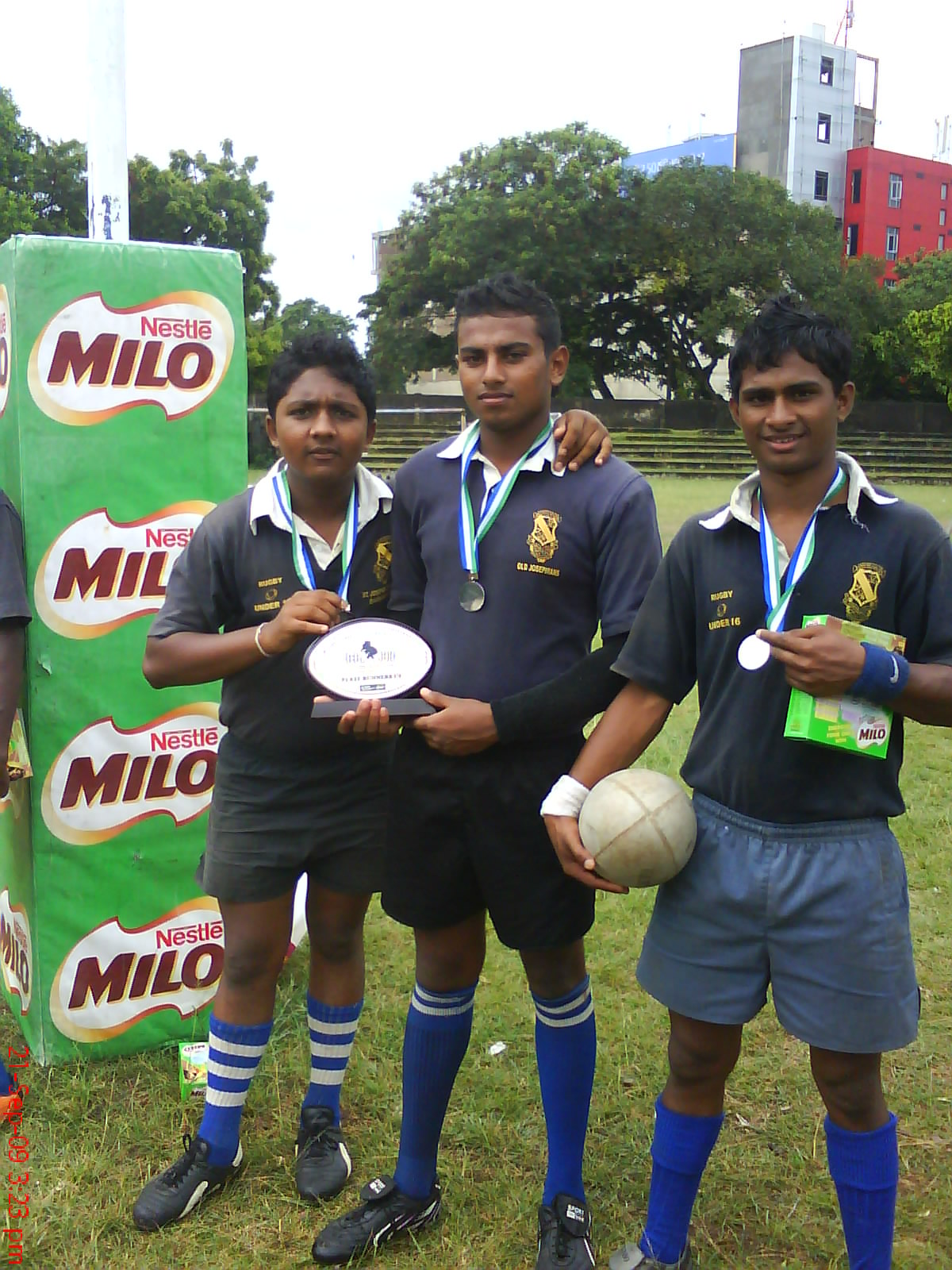
Rugby Captain

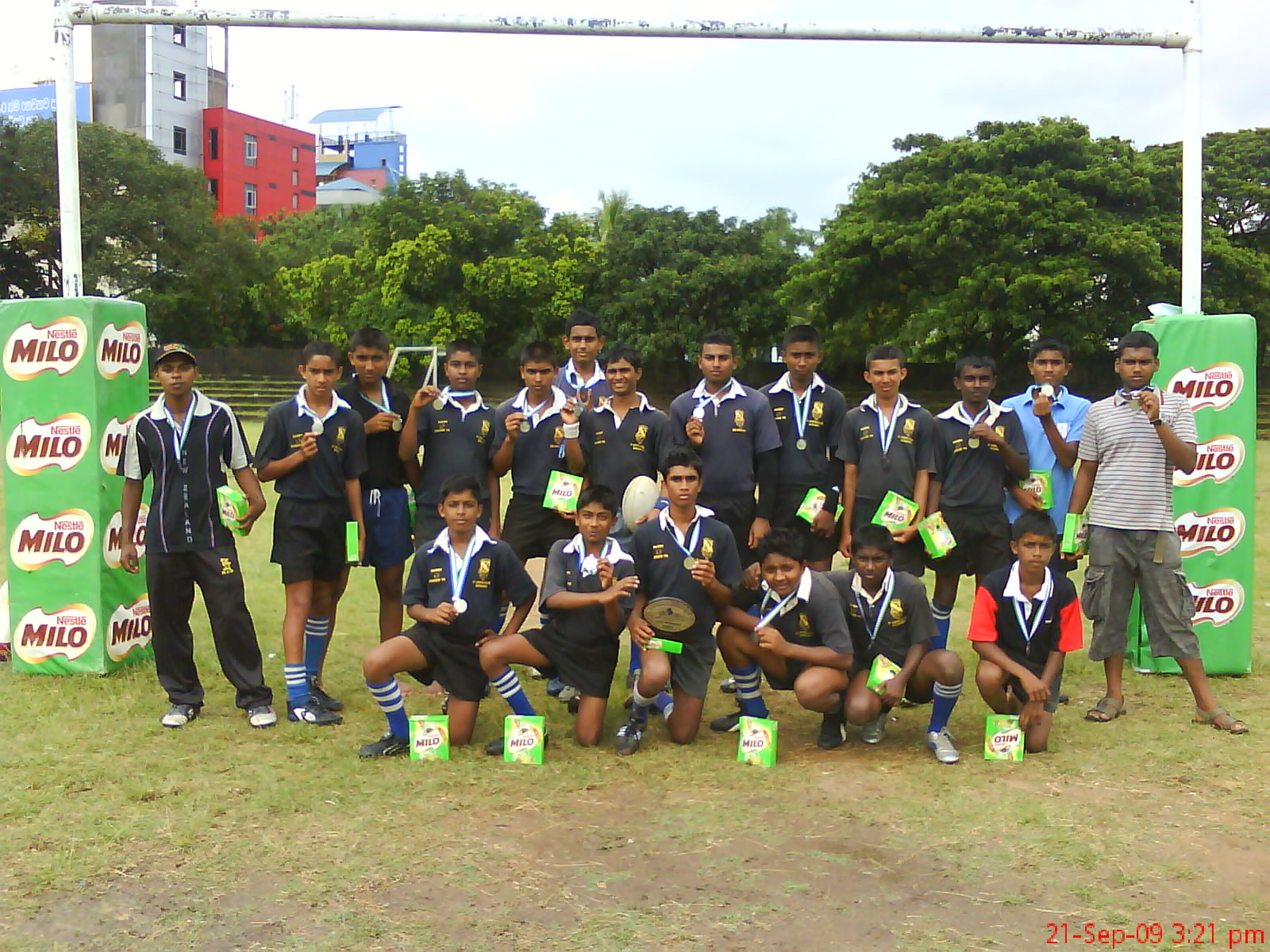
Our Rugby Team

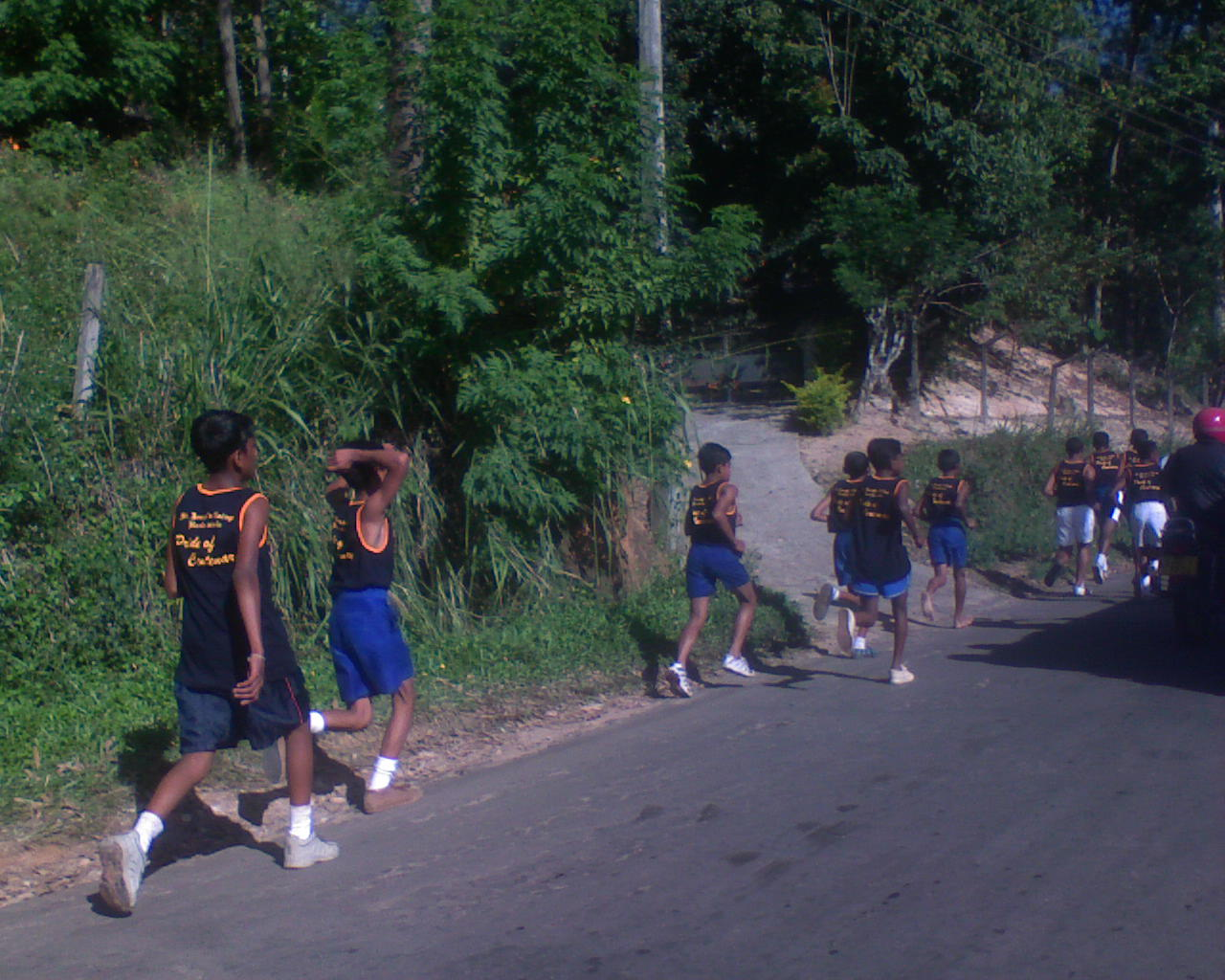
2009 Road Race

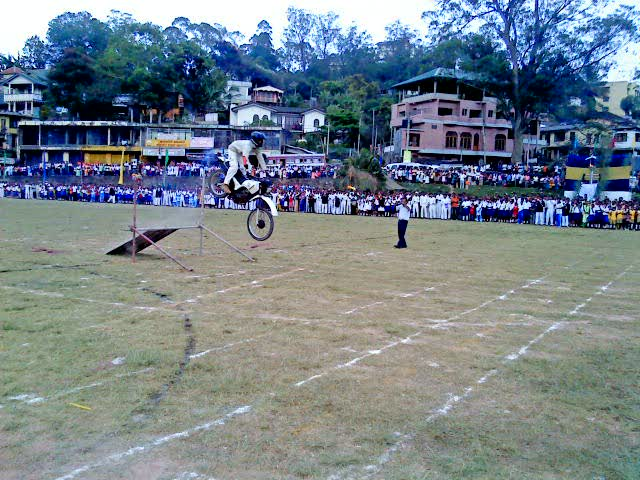
2010 Inter House Sport Meet

==== Battle of the Golds Uva ====
St. Joseph's College has a standing rivalry with Bandarawela Central College and have engaged in an annual cricket match titled the "Battle of the Golds Uva" since 1996. This is a revival of an older tradition of competition between these two schools that had been dormant since 1972.

=== Cadeting ===
The College Cadet Wing has a very long history, dating back to the distant past even before 1950.

The College had two Cadet Platoons as Junior and Senior, and the Cadet Platoons have qualified for the annually held Assessment Camps as well as the Hermann Loos Camp.

Furthermore, in the year 2008, the Army Cadet, Sea Cadet, and Air Cadet platoons introduced by the National Cadet Corps were also started in the College, and the College has produced more than 15 Cadet Regimental Sergeant Majors to date.

The College has produced more than 15 Cadet Regimental Sergeant Majors, a testament to its strong cadeting tradition.

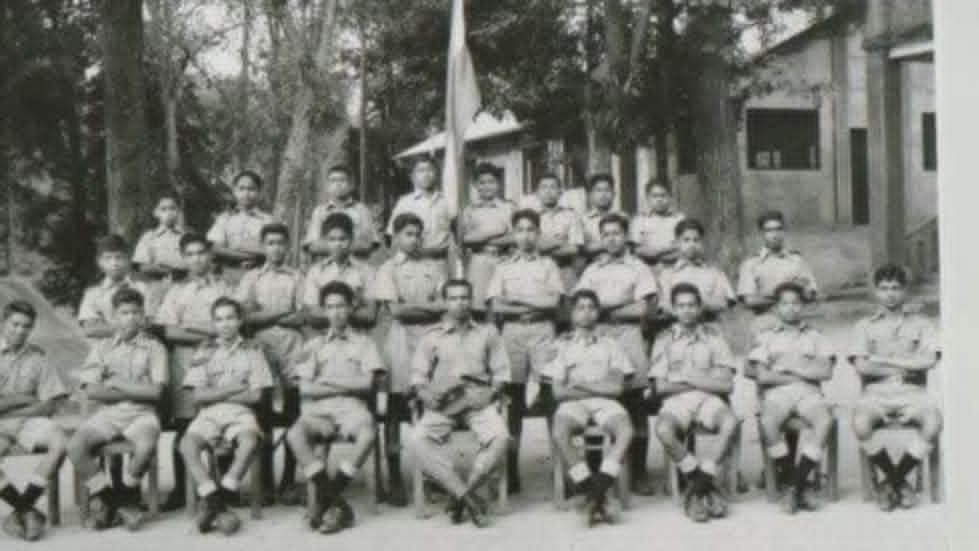
St.Joseph's College Bandarawela Junior Cadet Platoon in 1957

=== Cadet Band ===
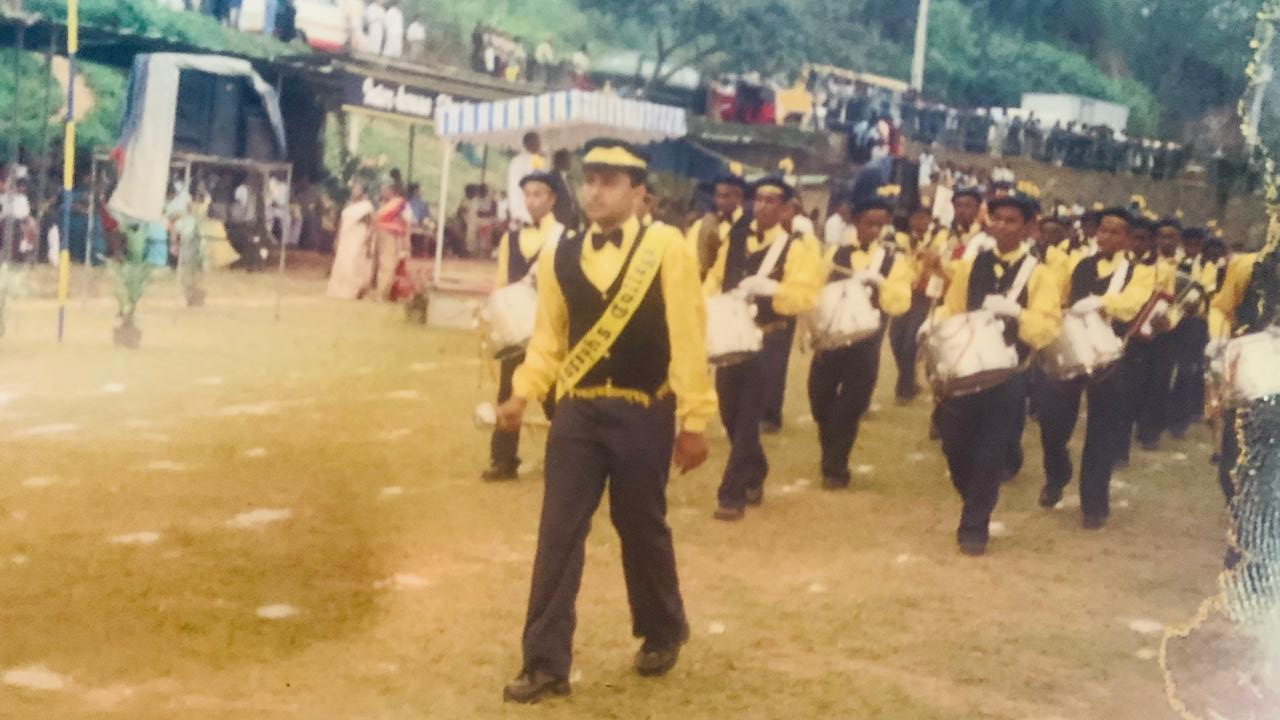
1st Western Band

The College Cadet Band Platoon was initiated in 1997 under the leadership of Sergeant Rasika Lokuhettiarachchi, and was officially registered as a Cadet Band of the National Cadet Corps in 1998. At present, it contributes to all special events of the College, and also participates in the National Cadet Corps All Island Western Band Competition, serves as the duty band for passing-out parades at cadet assessment camps, and competes in events such as the Wind Band Competition.

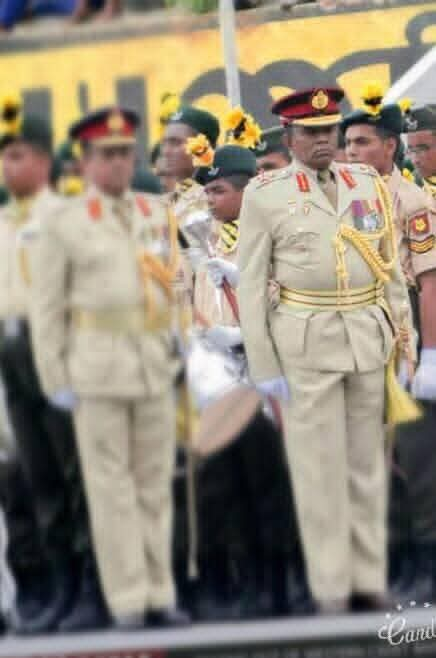
Sgt Yoshitha Binura

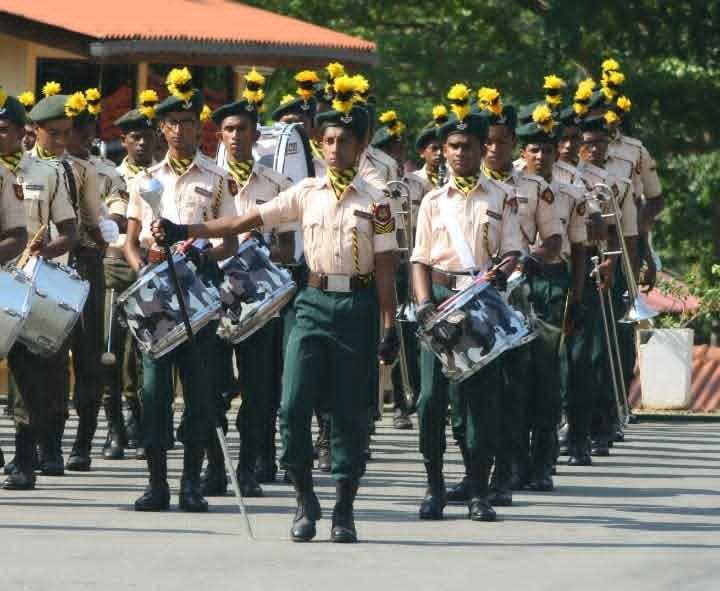
SGT Ravindu Viraj

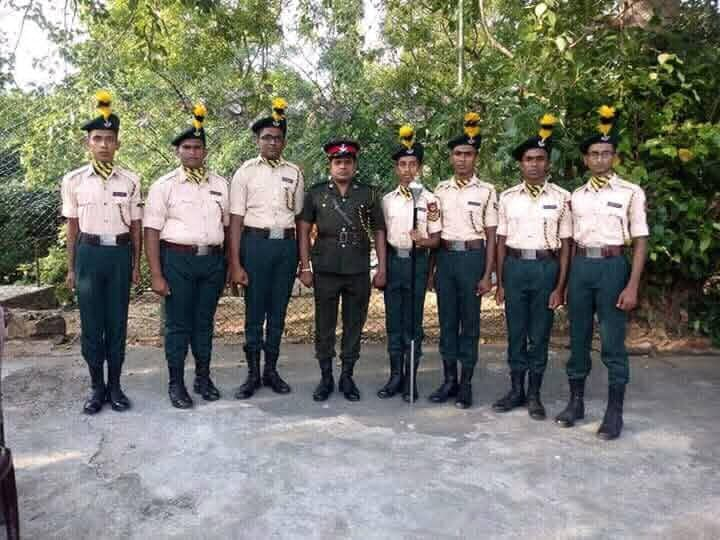
Rankers Board 2018

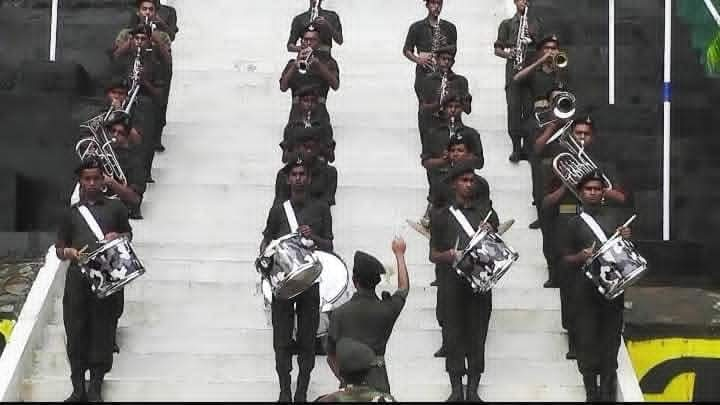
Cadet Advance Course - National Cadet Corps Training Center Rantambe - Duty Band ( 2018 )

Sergeant Ravindu Viraj was appointed as the first Cadet Under Officer of the Cadet Band in 2018. He was promoted to WO2 Company Sergeant Major (CSM) in 2019. The second Under Officer was Cadet Band Sergeant Hareen Jayawardhana in 2024. He was appointed as WO2 Cadet Drill Instructor in 2025, and he is also the first in the history of our College Cadet Band to be appointed as the Western Cadet Band Corps WO1 RSM of the National Cadet Corps in 2026

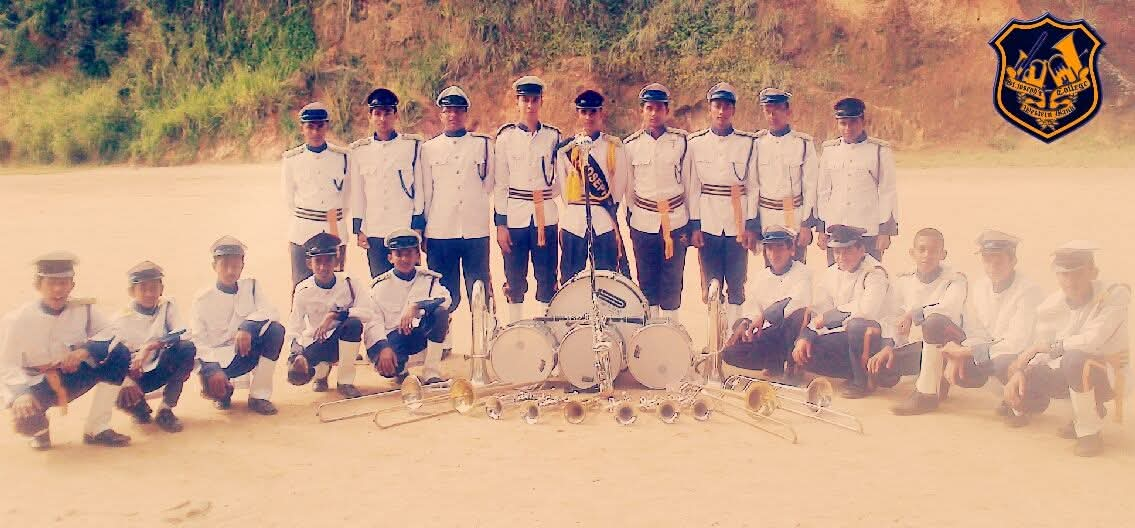
SGT Kalana Sandeepa 2015

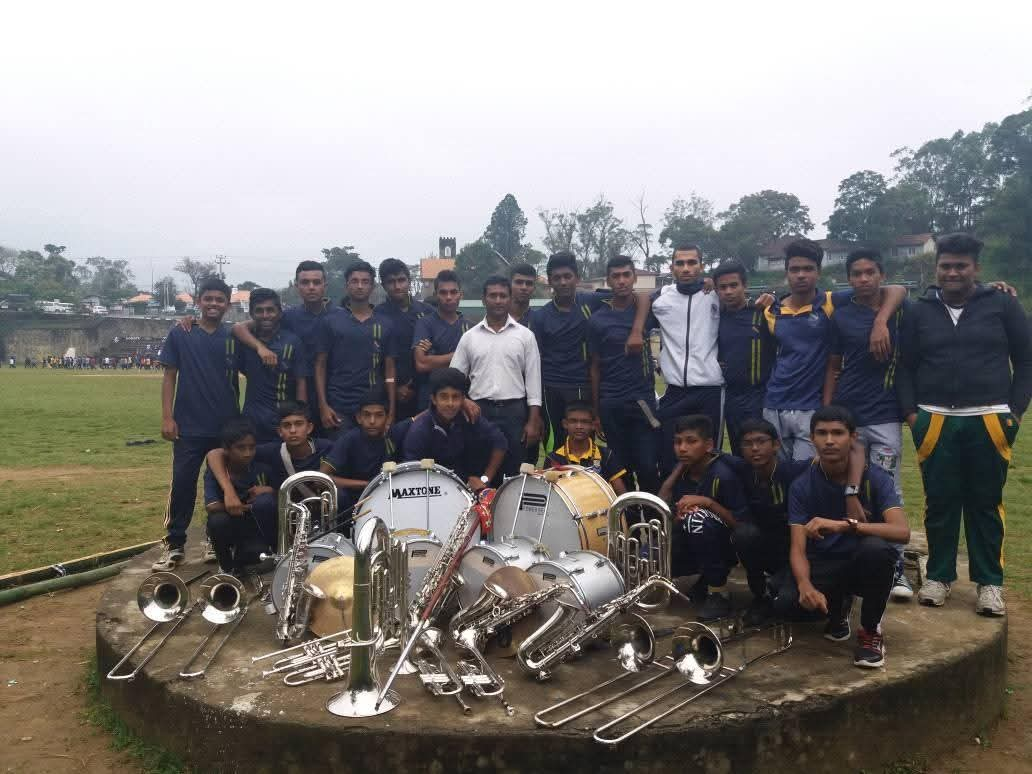
Free time of practice session

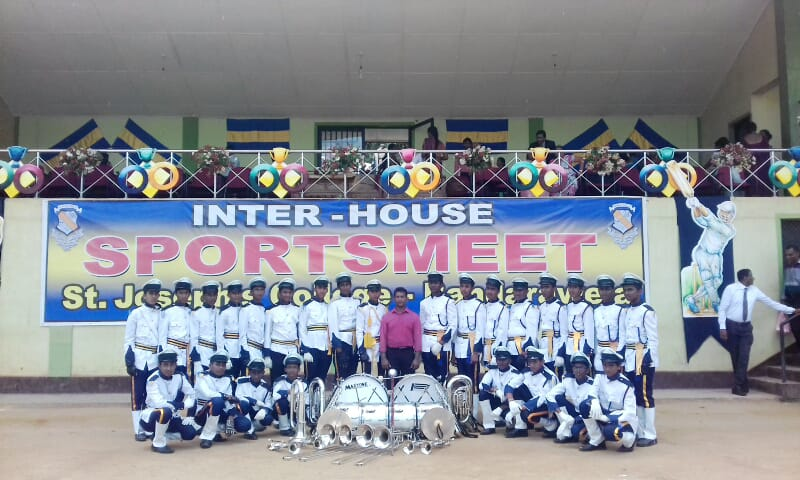
After the band display

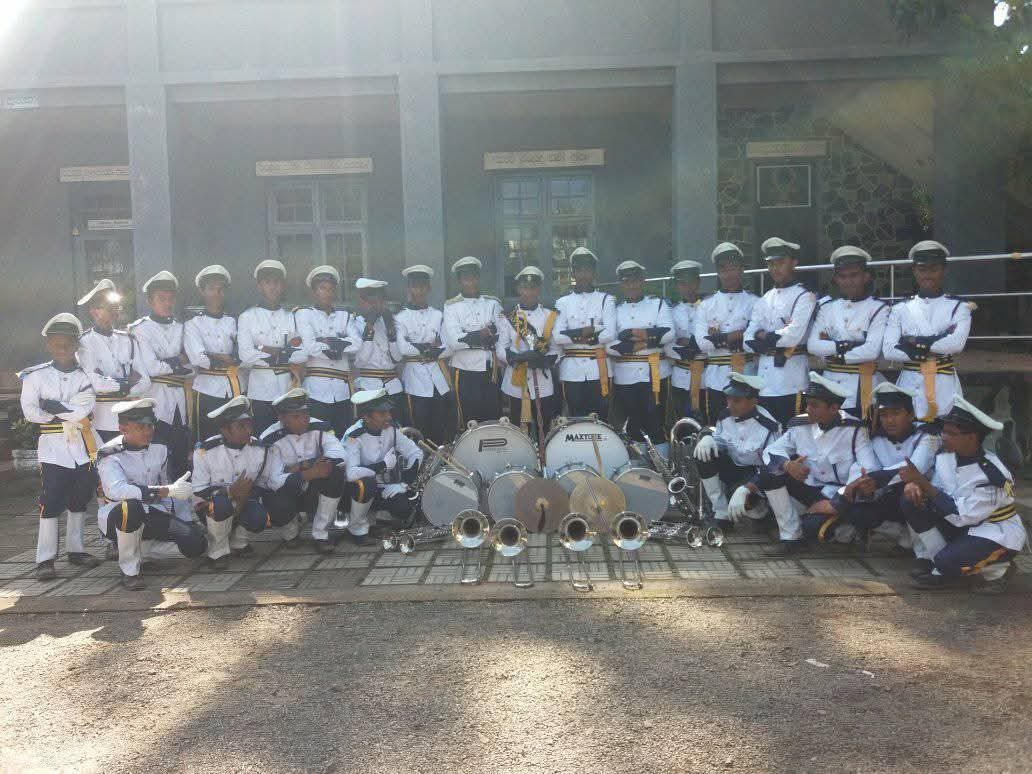
After Function

2019 All Island Western Cadet Band Competition

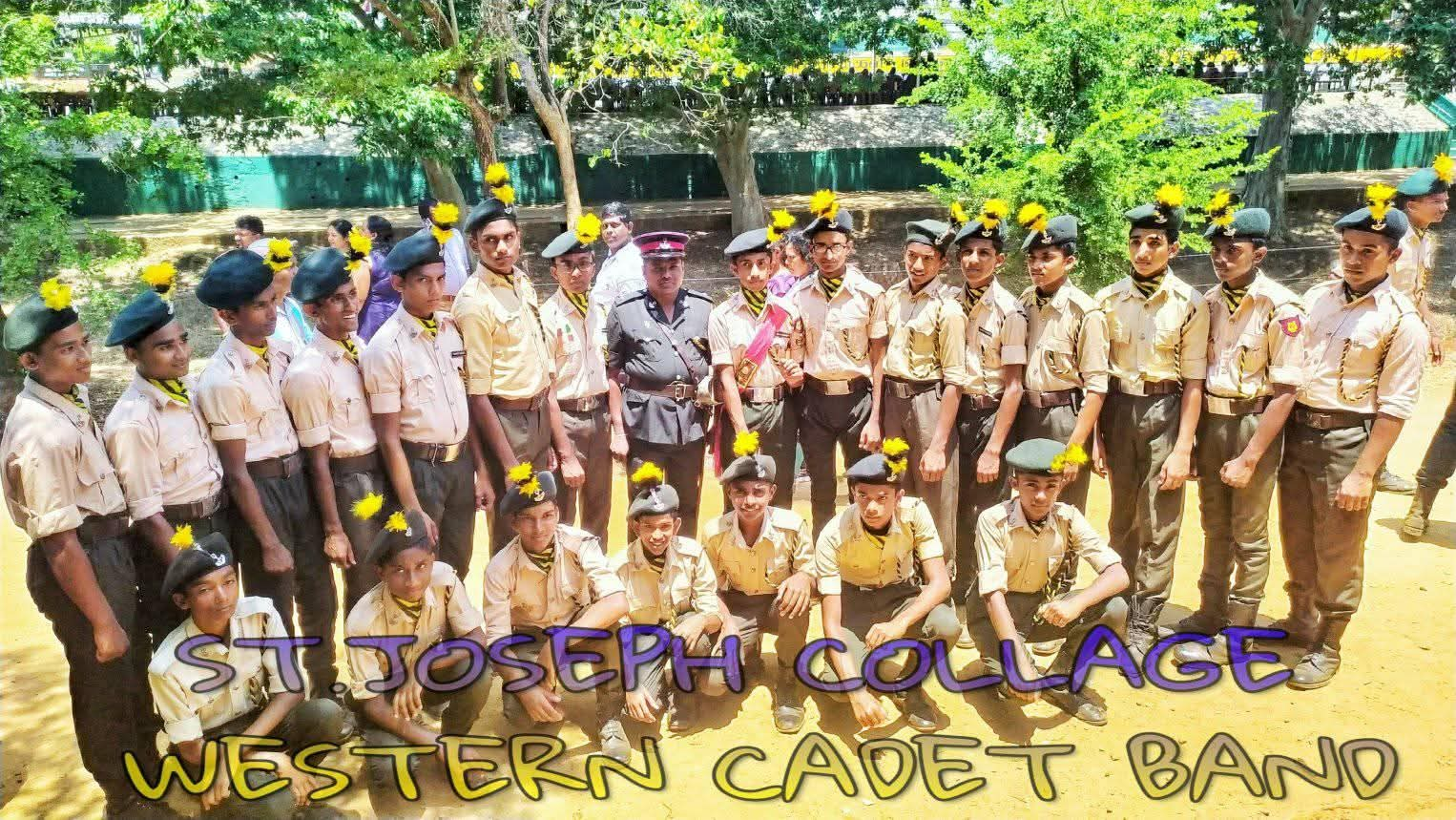
Sgt Kasun P Lakshan and Csm Ravindu Viraj

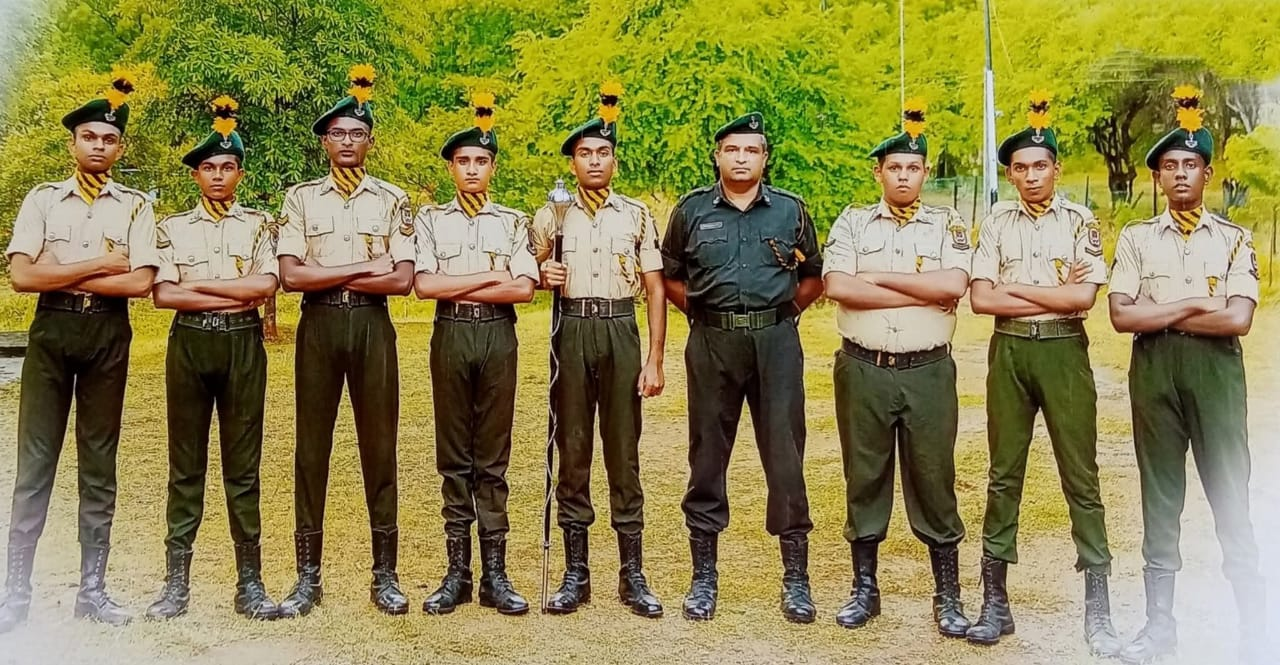
Rankers Board - 2024

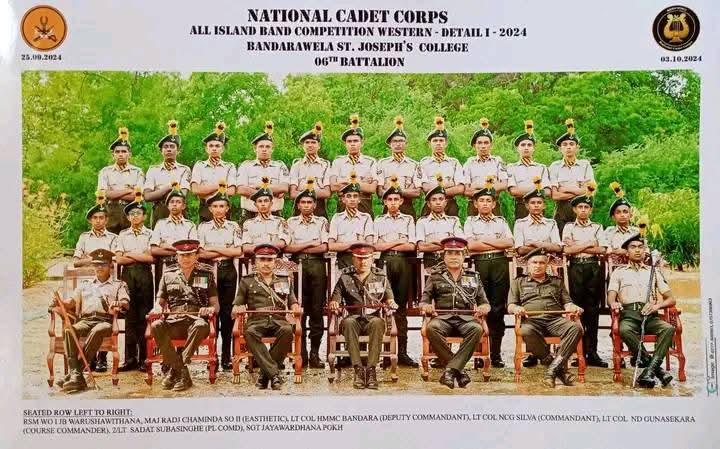
Sgt Jayawardhana PGKH

== Rectors / Head Masters / Principals ==
Title	Name	Period	Image
Rev.	Brother Simon Mathew (First Rector)	1909-1913	
Rev.	Brother Benjamin Lewis	1928-1933	
Rev.	Brother Elarius	1934-1938	
Rev.	Brother Onorius	1939-1951	
Rev.	Brother James	1952-1952	
Rev.	Brother Rudolph	1959-1961	
Mr.	W. M. de Silva (Acting Principal)	1962-1963	
Mr.	A. Deegalla	1963-1964	
Mr.	Pereliya K. Harschandra	1964-1967	
Mr.	S. W. Fernando	1967-1975	
Mr.	C. W. L. Mendis	1975-1978	
Ven.	Kanumuldeniye Ganaratana thera	1978-1994	
Mr.	H.M. Weerasekare (Acting Principal)	1994-1995	
Mr.	R. M. A. Rathnayake	1995-1996	
Mr.	A. M. Jayasekare (Acting Principal)	1996	
Mr.	D. M. Gunaratna	1996-2001	
Mr.	W. M. Karunasena	2001-2005	
Mr.	Withanage Wijesinghe (Acting Principal)	2005-2006	
Mr.	K. H. P. Jayatissa	2006-2011	
Mr.	Y. M. Amarasinghe (Acting Principal )		
Mr.	W.M. Bandula Wijesundara		
Mr.	Somarathne (Acting Principal)		
Mr.	R.W.M. Chandrasena(Acting Principal )		
Mr.	R.M. Laksiri J. Ranasinghe	10-06-2021	
Mr.	S.K. Samaranayake	2026	
