= St Joseph's College, Enniskillen =

Coordinates: 54.3507°N 7.6226°W

St. Joseph's College, Enniskillen

Location
- Chanterhill Road; Enniskillen, County Fermanagh, BT74 6DE; Northern Ireland

Information
- Type: Maintained secondary school
- Religious affiliation: Roman Catholic
- Established: 1960
- Principal: Helena Palmer
- Gender: Boys
- Age: 11 to 18
- Enrolment: 287
- Colour
- Website: https://stjosephscollegeenniskillen.co.uk/

St. Joseph's College is a boys' secondary school located in Enniskillen, County Fermanagh, Northern Ireland. It lies within the Western Education Authority area. The college is a member of the Fermanagh Learning Community with links to the South West College, Enniskillen.

== History ==
The college opened in 1960 and was originally under the care of the Presentation Brothers. Bryan Gallagher was principal of St. Joseph's from 1984 until his retirement in 1996. He then became a successful author and popular radio guest on John Peel's Home Truths, a contributor to RTE’s Sunday Miscellany, and a presenter for Radio Ulster’s Thought for the Day.

In 2015, Helena Palmer was appointed the school's first female principal.

== Location and Facilities ==
It is located on a nine acre site at Drumclay, Enniskillen. The school building includes specialist classrooms for science, art and design, computers, home economics and music.

== Admissions ==
The college recruits students from the parishes of Enniskillen, Botha, Pobal, and Cleenish.

Approximately 10% of students are from non-English speaking families including families from Poland, Hungary, Lithuania, Moldova, Latvia and Syria.

== Academics ==
Students have the opportunity of studying a broad range of subjects and to enter for GCSE, A-Level and BTech examinations. A total of 96% of the students who entered the GCSE exams were awarded five or more A*-C grades. In the same year, 63.6% of the students who entered the A-Level exams were awarded three or more A*-C grades.

A 2011 ETI (Education and Training Inspectorate) inspection found that the quality of education provided at St. Joseph's was "very good".

== Sporting activities ==
Students can participate in a range of sporting activities including Gaelic football, soccer, athletics and badminton.

== Community activities ==
Students from the college have been involved in supporting a variety of local charitable organisations. These include Enniskillen Food Bank, Action Mental Health: New Horizons, and Pieta House.

== Notable former pupils ==
- Adrian Dunbar - actor
- Declan O'Dare - architect
- Jamie Ray - footballer
