= St Joseph Engineering College =

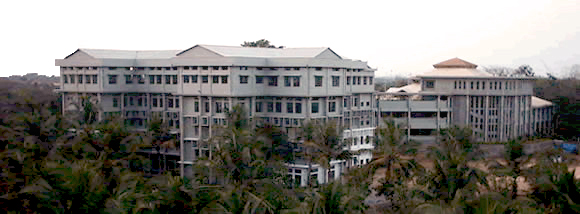

Location
- Vamanjoor, Mangaluru; India; 12°54′37″N 74°53′54″E

Information
- Type: Private Engineering College
- Established: 2002
- Director: Rev. Fr. Wilfred Prakash D’Souza
- Principal: Dr Rio D'Souza
- Asst Director: Rev. Fr Kenneth Rayner Crasta
  - Under-graduates: 540
  - Post-graduates: 174
- Website: http://www.sjec.ac.in
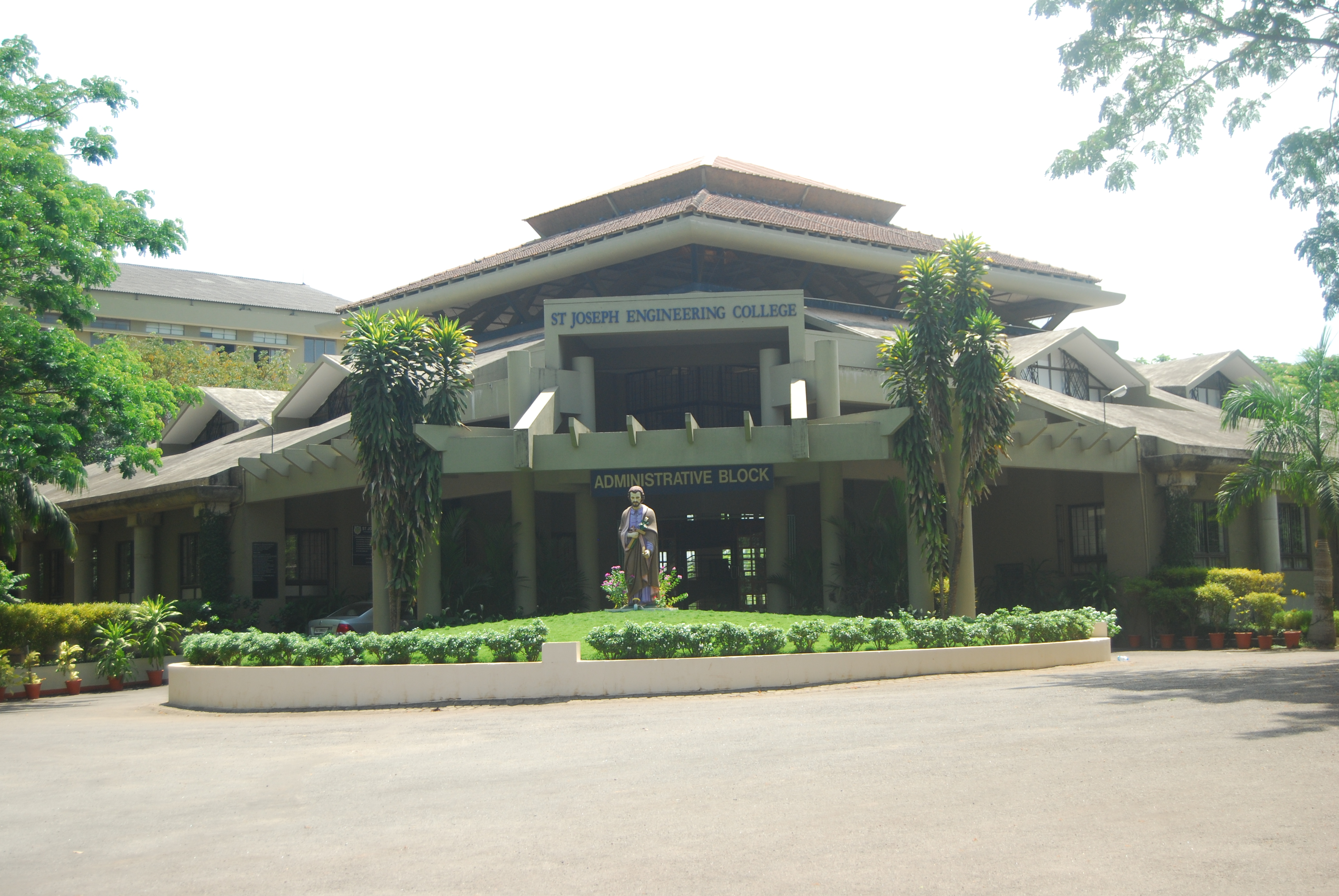
- Administrative Block

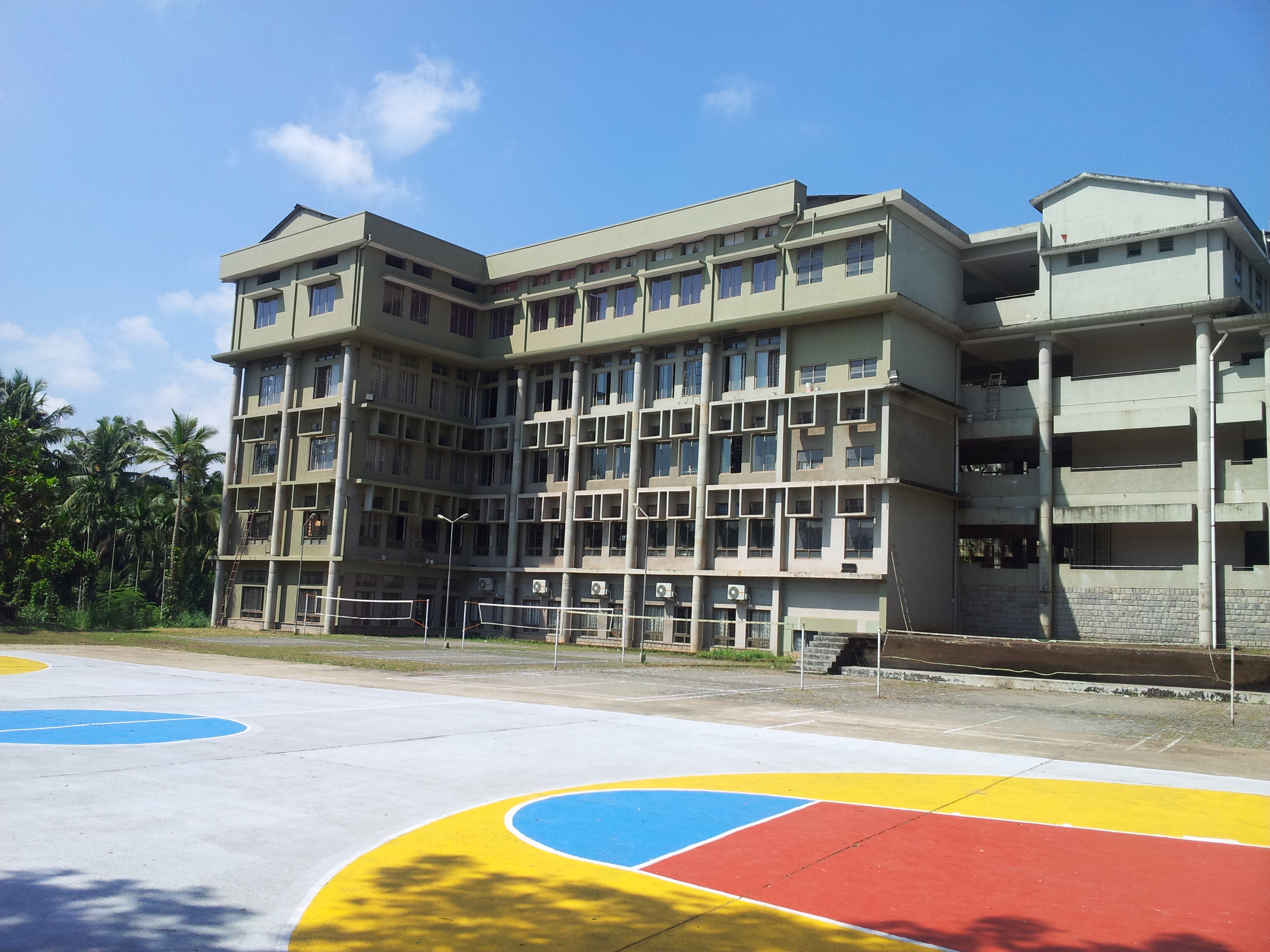
- Electronics and Communication Dept.

St Joseph Engineering College (SJEC) is an engineering college in Vamanjoor, Mangaluru, India. Being a unit of the Roman Catholic Diocese of Mangalore, it is the only Catholic engineering institute in Mangalore. It was established in 2002.

An autonomous institute under Visvesvaraya Technological University, Belagavi, Karnataka State, SJEC is recognized by the All India Council for Technical Education (AICTE), New Delhi. It offers five NBA Accredited B.E. Programs viz. Mechanical Engineering, Computer Science and Engineering, Electronics and Communication Engineering, Electrical and Electronics Engineering and Civil Engineering.

It offers undergraduate and postgraduate courses in Engineering, Masters in Business Administration and Masters in Computer Applications.

== History ==
The college was established in the year 2002 as St Joseph Engineering College by Diocese of Mangalore under the guidance of bishop Aloysius Paul D'Souza by Fr Valerian D'Souza .

== Campus ==
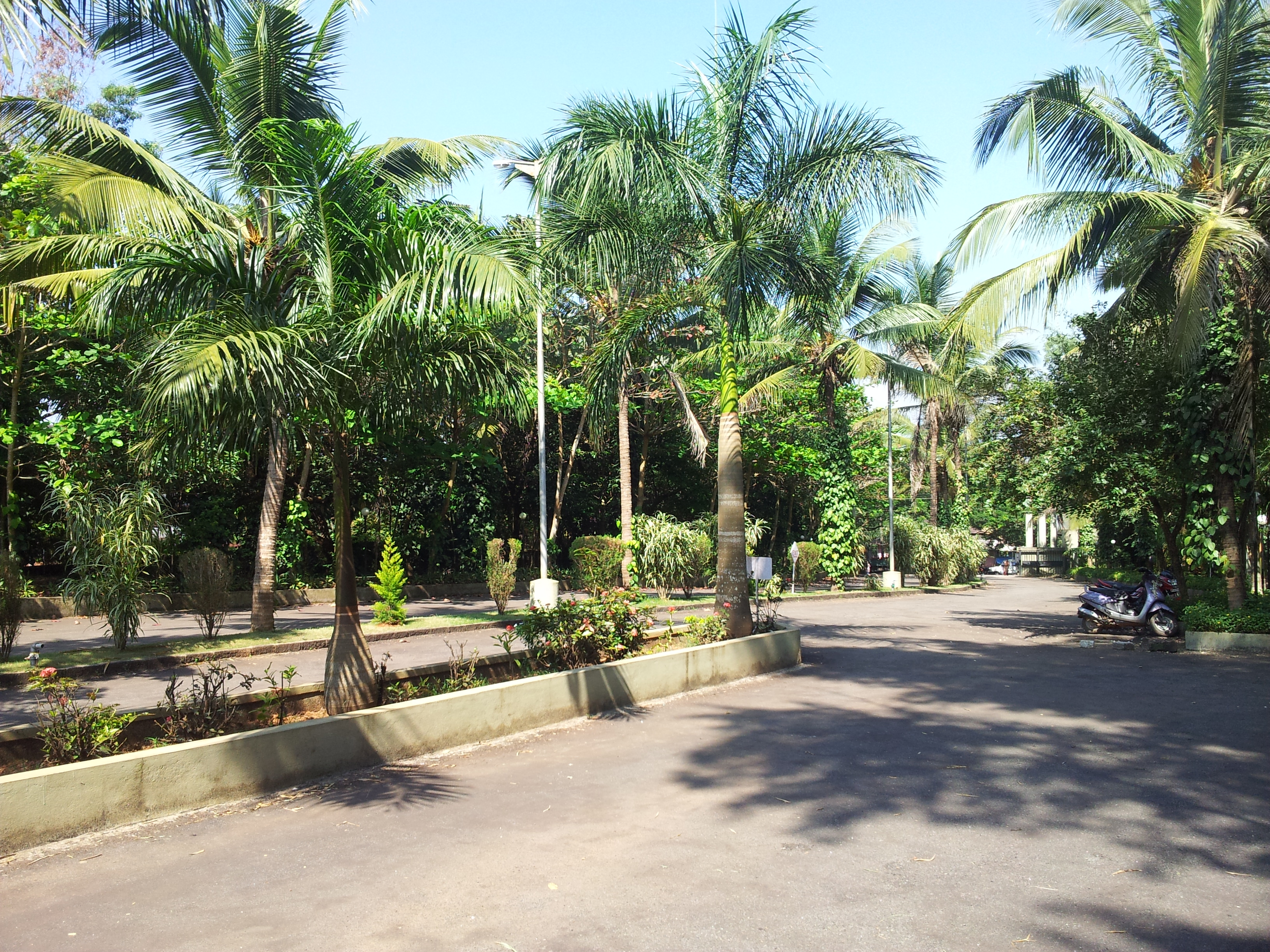
The Main Entrance

St Joseph Engineering College campus is located at Vamanjoor 10 kilometres (6 mi) to the east of Mangalore City centre, which is well connected by train, road and air. City and service buses run every five minutes from the city centre to the college campus along the National Highway towards Moodbidri via Kulshekar. There are three academic blocks in the college, which house all the departments.

=== Hostels ===
There are separate male and female hostels on the campus.

== Governing board and management ==
- President - Most Rev. Dr Peter Paul Saldanha - Bishop of Mangalore.
- Vice President - Rt. Rev. Msgr Maxim Noronha - Vicar General of Diocese of Mangalore.
- Director - Rev. Fr Wilfred Prakash D’Souza
- Assistant Director - Rev. Fr Alwyn Richard D'Souza.
- Principal - Dr Rio D'Souza

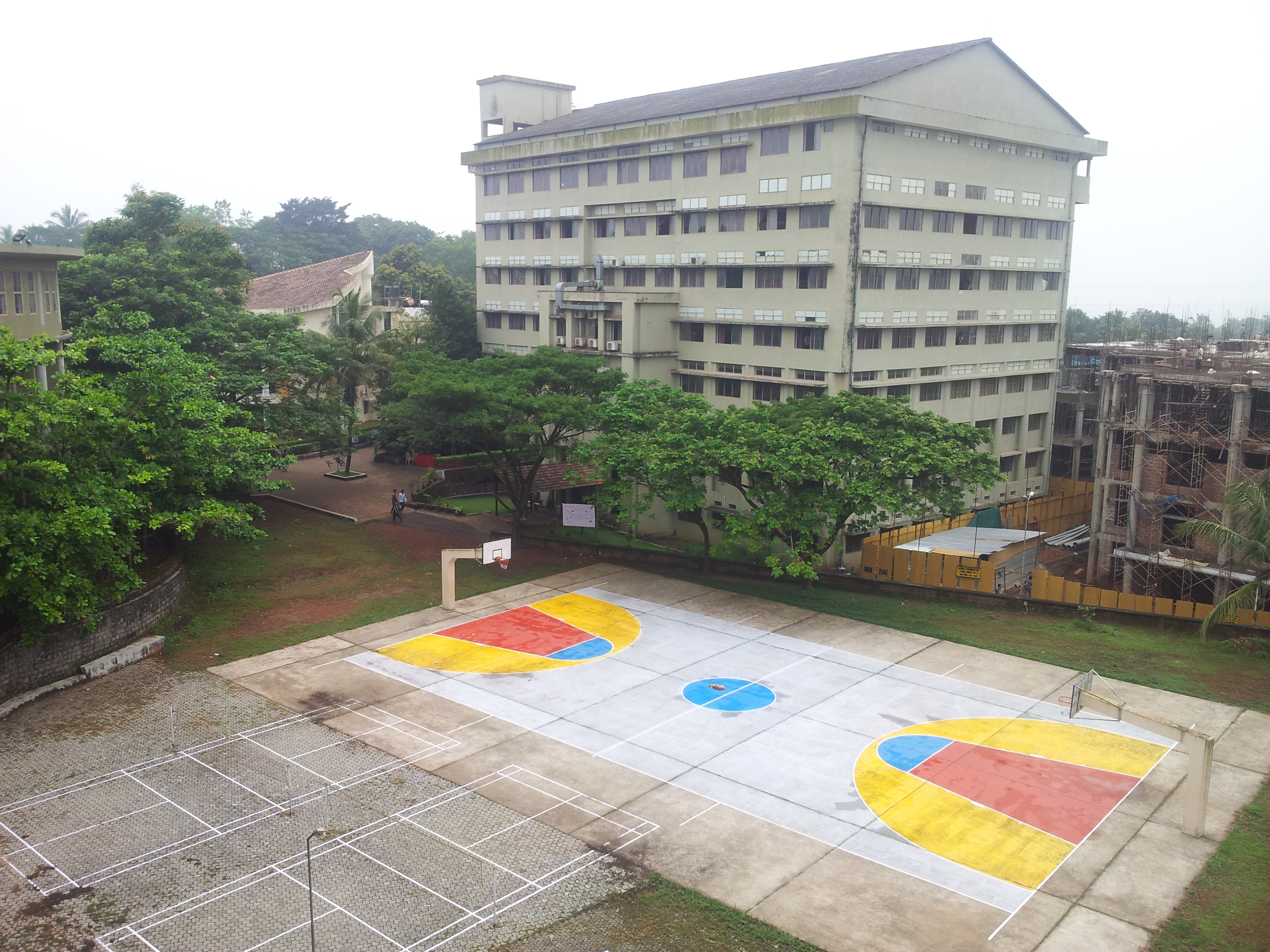
Basketball Court,Academic Block-II and Under construction (Academic Block-III

== Academic profile ==
The following BE courses are Accredited by the National Board of Accreditation, Delhi: Computer Science Engineering, Electronics and Communication Engineering and Electrical and Electronics Engineering for the Year 2016-2019.

=== Departments and courses ===
Undergraduate

These departments offer four-year undergraduate courses in engineering

- Mechanical Engineering
- Electronics and Communication Engineering
- Electrical and Electronics Engineering
- Computer Science and Engineering
- Computer Science and Business Studies.
- Artificial Intelligence and Machine Learning.
- Civil Engineering

Postgraduate

- Masters in Business Administration (MBA)
- Masters in Computer Applications (MCA)
- Masters in Technology in Mechanical Engineering (MTech-CAMS)
- Masters in Technology in Electrical Engineering (MTech-PE)
- Masters in Computer Science and Engineering (MTech-CSE)
- M.Sc. (Engg.) by Research in Mechanical Engineering
- M.Sc. (Engg.) by Research in Computer Science & Engineering
- M.Sc (Engg. ) by Research in Electrical and Electronics Engineering
- Ph.D. in Physics, Chemistry, Mechanical Engineering, Computer Science and Engineering, Electrical and Electronics Engineering and Business Administration.

== Distribution of seats ==
The distribution of seats are as follows:-

- Mechanical Engineering, 120 seats
- Electronics and Communication Engineering, 120 seats
- Electrical and Electronics Engineering, 60 seats
- Computer Science and Engineering, 120 seats
- Civil Engineering, 60 seats
- Masters in Business Administration, 60 seats
- Masters in Computer Applications, 60 seats
- Masters in Technology in Computer Science and Engineering, 18 seats
- Masters in Technology in Electronics and Communication Engineering, 18 seats
- Masters in Technology in Electrical Engineering, 18 seats

== Student activities ==
=== Technical fest ===
- The Annual National Level Technical fest of SJEC is called TIARA held in the Month of February
- College Day Celebrations - February
- Annual Sports Day - February
- Foundation Day Lecture - February
- Yuvalakshya - National Level UG Fest - February
- ZEPHYR - National Level Management Fest - April
- TechPrints - National Level Technical Paper Presentation - MCA - April
- eTIME - National Conference on Emerging Trends in Mechanical Engineering - August
- NCACSP - National Conference on Advances in Communication and Signal Processing - August
- Joshiana - National Level IT Fest - (September - October)
- Milan- Cultural festival celebration - September
- Rendition - September
- Graduation Day - November

=== Sports ===
The following sports facilities are available:

- Athletics – 200 m track
- Basketball court
- Four outdoor shuttle badminton courts
- Football ground / hockey ground / handball court
- Cricket field
- Volleyball court / throw ball court
- Multi-gym facility for men and women
- Indoor: carrom, chess, table tennis
