= Saint Joseph College of Maasin =

Roman Catholic college in Southern Leyte, Philippines

Saint Joseph College
- Former names: Instituto de San Jose (1928‑1947); Saint Joseph Junior College (1947‑1949)
- Motto: God, Country, Knowledge
- Type: Private, Roman Catholic Coeducational Basic and Higher education institution
- Established: February 20, 1928
- Founders: Bishop Sofronio G. Hacbang, D.D.
- Academic affiliations: PAASCU
- President: Very Rev. Msgr. Oscar A. Cadayona, PhD, SThL-MA
- Location: Tomas Oppus St., Brgy. Tunga-tunga, Maasin, Southern Leyte, Philippines; 10°07′55″N 124°50′15″E
- Campus: Urban
- Patron saint: Saint Joseph
- Alma Mater song: Saint Joseph College Hymn
- Colors: Green , White , and Yellow
- Nicknames: Josephinians, Jose
- Website: www.sjc.edu.ph
- Location in the Visayas Location in the Philippines

Saint Joseph College is a college located at Tomas Oppus Street, Maasin, Southern Leyte, Philippines. It was established in 1928 and is a member of the Commission on Higher Education (Philippines) (CHED), through the Federation of Accrediting Agencies of the Philippines (FAAP) and the Philippine Accrediting Association of Schools, Colleges and Universities (PAASCU). and it is recognized as one of the oldest Catholic Colleges in the Philippines (formerly Saint Joseph Junior College, 1947–48).

The college provides education at the undergraduate and graduate levels, offering degrees in various majors, special course offerings and certificates, affiliated and pre-professional programs through its School of Arts and Sciences and its School of Professional and Graduate Studies. The Students are called Josephinians. The school's official hashtag is #JosephiniansTranscend.

== Academic programs ==
Master's degree

- Master in Business Administration G.R. No. 009 s. 1996 - DRO
- Master of Arts in Education G.R. No. 028 s. 1988 - DCO

Bachelor's degree

- Bachelor of Arts in Economics G.R. No. 274 s. 1960 - DCO
- Bachelor of Arts in English Language G.R. No. 274 s. 1960 - DCO
- Bachelor of Arts in Preparatory Law
- B. in Elementary Education G.R. No. 161 s. 1965 - DCO
- B. in Secondary Education (not indicated)
- B. S. in Accountancy G.R. No. 03 s. 1991 - DRO
- B. S. in Civil Engineering G.R. No. 926 s. 1985 - DRO
- B. S. in Commerce (not indicated)
- B. S. in Computer Science G.R. No. 03 s. 1997 - CRO
- B. S. in Criminology G.R. No. 17 s. 2001 - CRO
- B. S. in Office Administration G.R. No. 02 s. 1997 - CRO
- B. S. in Hospitality and Tourism Management
- B. S. in Architecture

Association

- Associate in Computer Technology G.R. No. 8-006 s. 1995 - DRO
- Associate in Office Administration G.R. No. 003 s. 1996 - CRO

Other Courses

- One-Year Automotive Mechanic Course
- Two-Year Special Vocational Secretarial Course

High School, Elementary & Pre-School

- Secondary (High School) Day G.R. No. 006 s. 2002 - DRO
- Secondary (High School) Night G.R. No. 66 s. 1977 - DCO
- Elementary G.R. No. 365 s. 1946 - DCO
- Pre-School G.R. No. 112 s. 1978 - DCO

== See also ==
- Colleges and Universities of Southern Leyte
- List of universities and colleges in the Philippines
