= St Joseph's College, Coalisland =

Coordinates: 54.546°N 6.707°W

St Joseph's College, Coalisland Coláiste Naomh Seosamh, Oileán an Ghuail

Location
- 29 School Lane, Coalisland, BT71 4NW; Northern Ireland

Information
- Type: Secondary School
- Religious affiliation: Roman Catholic
- Established: 1968
- Local authority: Education Authority (Western)
- Principal: Ciara Donnelly
- Staff: 25 approx.
- Gender: Co-educational
- Age: 11 to 16
- Enrolment: 362
- Colour
- Website: www.stjosephscoalisland.org

St Joseph's College (Irish: Coláiste Naomh Seosamh) is a Catholic secondary school located in Coalisland, County Tyrone, Northern Ireland.

== Academics ==
The college provides the standard five years of secondary education consisting of Key Stage 3 from Year 8 until Year 10, and two-year GCSE courses from Year 11 until Year 12 in Key Stage 4. It also provides a Post 16 Qualification Enhancement Programme. In 2018, 47.2% of its entrants achieved five or more GCSEs at grades A* to C, including the core subjects English and Maths.

Children whose normal place of residence is within the contributory parishes of Ballyclog/Donaghenry (Stewartstown/Coalisland), Clonoe, Dungannon, Drummullan, Pomeroy and Ardboe receive first priority after those in special care.
