= St. Joseph College–Olongapo =

Roman Catholic college in Olongapo, Philippines

- Kolehiyo ng San Jose; Dalubhasaan ng San Jose
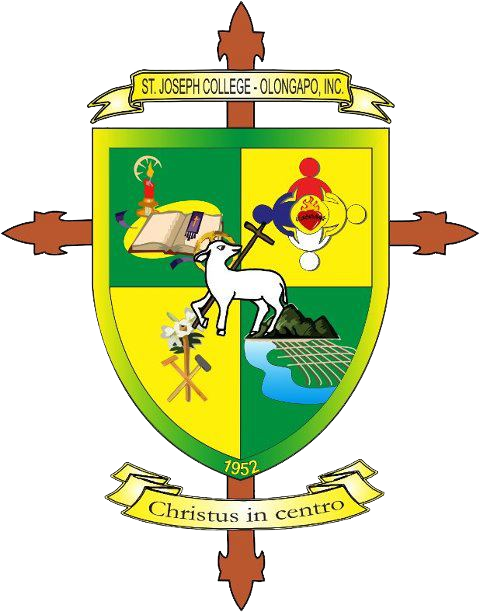
- Former names: St. Joseph's School (1945); St. Joseph's Catholic School of Olongapo (until 2004)
- Motto: Christus in centro (Latin)
- Motto in English: "Christ in the center"
- Type: Private basic and higher education institution
- Established: 1945
- Religious affiliation: Diocese of Iba; Society of the Divine Word
- Academic affiliations: CEAP; PAASCU; FAPE
- President: Rev. Fr. Joel T. Huerto, Ph.D
- Principal: Teresa Sabado (K-10); Dr. Julius Cesar G. De Vera (Senior High School)
- Dean: Diana Tolentino
- Students: Approximately 3,550 (all levels)
- Location: Olongapo, Zambales, Philippines; 14°50′10″N 120°17′07″E
- School publication: The Shield
- Colors: Green and Yellow
- Website: sjc-o.com

Saint Joseph College–Olongapo, Inc. (abbreviated as SJC-O; Filipino: Kolehiyo ng San Jose or Dalubhasaan ng San Jose) is a private Catholic educational institution located in Olongapo, Zambales, Philippines. It is one of the Catholic institutions under the Diocese of Iba dedicated to serve the educational needs of the students of Olongapo and of the neighboring towns of Zambales and Bataan. It is the oldest sectarian school in Olongapo City.

== History ==
St. Joseph College–Olongapo (then St. Joseph's School) was formally established in 1945 after World War II by the Society of the Divine Word (SVD) at a makeshift site with non-formal classes, with Father Rizalino Veneracion as its first director. The school was constructed at the corner of Fendler and Apo streets.

In 1947, the school was transferred to its present site—along 18th Street corner Barretto, Canda, and Elicaño Streets. Fr. Restituto Canda of the SVD became the director, with Irene Talanay as the high school principal.

The school was given government recognition in 1949. During 1950 to 1951, the Columban Fathers and Sisters from the Missionary Society of St. Columban of Ireland took over the management of the school, with Rev. Fr. Joseph Coneely as the director and Sister Mary Consuelo as the principal. The school was fully recognized by the Department of Education, Culture and Sports (DECS) in 1952. Classes were held in day-and-night sessions to cater to young resident students as well as middle-aged and old employees and servicemen of the US Navy.

The missionary priests of the Society of St. Columban paved the way for the rising three-storey east wing in 1966. Fr. Thomas L. Convery took over as director and was granted ownership of the campus. The Columban Sisters served as principals and treasurers of the school. During the Marcos regime, all Columban Sisters left the country for reassignment in foreign missions and the management of the school was temporarily assigned to the Sisters of the Daughters of Charity.

Abiding by the Filipinization of the Philippine parishes scheme, the St. Columban Missionary Society handed over the parish and school management to the diocesan priests of the Prelature of Iba, Zambales during the school year of 2000–2001.

In February 2004, St Joseph's Catholic School of Olongapo, became officially known as St. Joseph College–Olongapo.

At present, the school has an elementary department and a junior high school department, and has recently established its senior high school department as per the implementation of the K-12 curriculum.
