= St. Joseph's College (Santa Clara County, California) =

Coordinates: 37°19′52″N 122°5′10″W

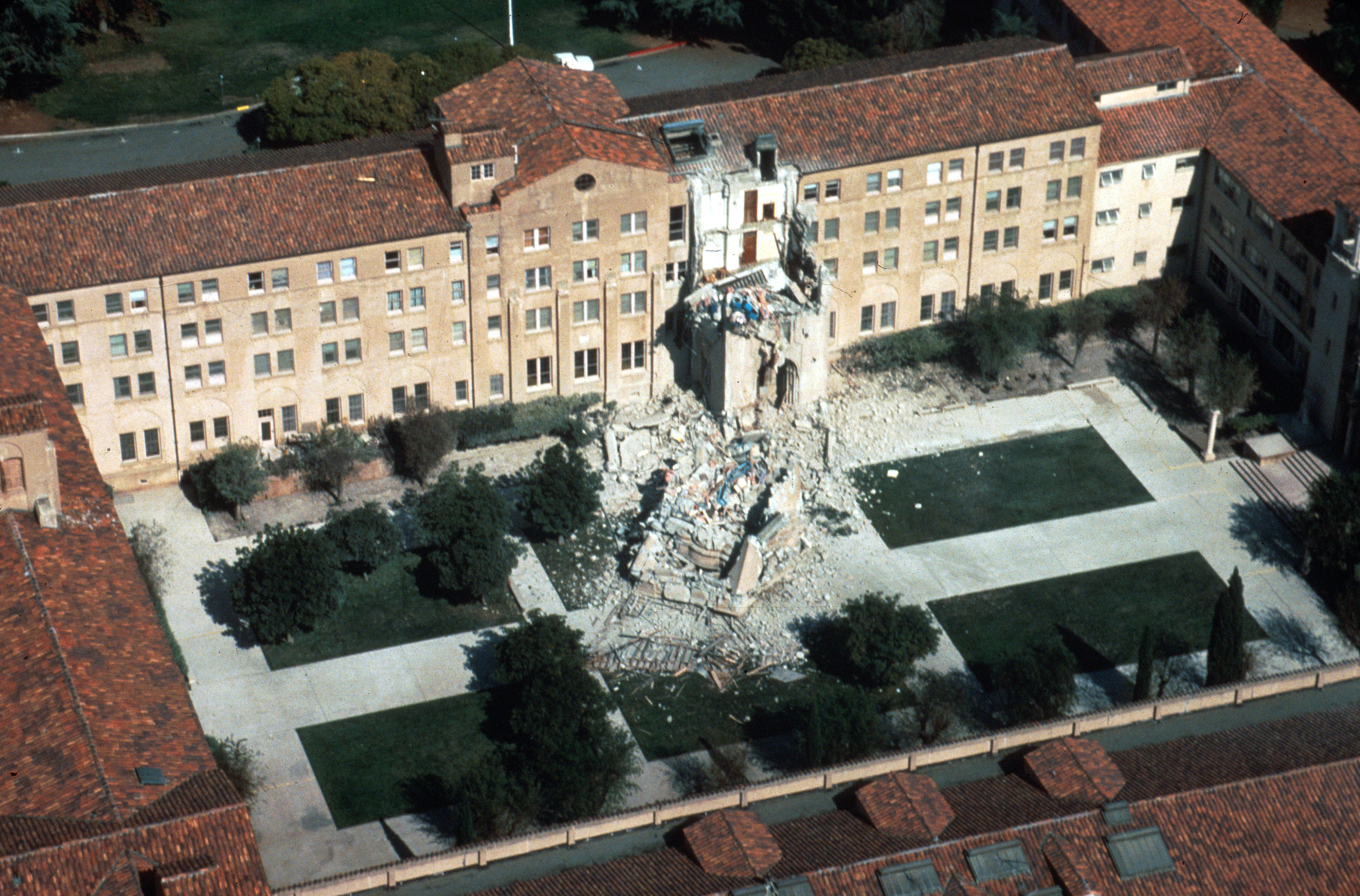
During the 1989 Loma Prieta earthquake, one person died when a five-story tower collapsed.

St. Joseph's College was a seminary of the Archdiocese of San Francisco at Los Altos, California, which opened in September 1924. It was also referred to as St. Joseph's Seminary. It was run by the Sulpician Fathers.

Its creation was supervised by Archbishop Edward J. Hanna. Hanna ordered the purchase of 700 acres and the seminary was considered "the jewel of his accomplishments."

The seminary buildings were severely damaged by the Loma Prieta earthquake on October 17, 1989. The seminary was permanently closed on June 30, 1991. The site is now part of Rancho San Antonio County Park.
