= St Joseph's College, Curepipe =

St. Joseph's College
- St. Joseph's College
- Curepipe; Mauritius

Information
- Type: Catholic boys' secondary school
- Motto: Ad altiora cum Christo
- Established: January 1877
- Oversight: Diocese of Port-Louis
- Principal: Natalie Catian
- Enrollment: Joséphiens

St. Joseph's College is a Catholic boys' secondary school located in Curepipe, Mauritius. It is one of the main secondary schools in Curepipe and Mauritius. Opened by the Brothers of Christian Schools in January 1877, it has been administered by the Diocese of Port-Louis since 1985. Its motto is Ad altiora cum Christo. The students are known as "Joséphien".

== History ==
Curepipe was founded in 1867 when part of the population abandoned Port Louis, the capital, to escape malaria and settled in the highlands. Curepipe developed rapidly and achieved city status in 1890.

In 1870, Brother Vinoch, director of St. Joseph's College in Port Louis, which was part of the Madagascar province of the congregation, planned to build a rest house and sanatorium for sick boarders from the coast in Curepipe. He acquired land in 1875 from the parish priest of St. Therese Parish, Father Comerford, just behind the church. The house of the Brothers in Grande Rivière was moved to Curepipe and opened as a boarding school in January 1877. (Note: Families Adam, Reid, Coutanceau, Regnard, d'Arifat, etc. contributed to its establishment.) The college was expanded in 1896, and a large statue of the Virgin Mary was inaugurated in 1899 thanks to contributions from the students' families.

The college closed temporarily in 1920-1921 due to a controversy regarding the teaching of Latin, a core subject of the institution, to the sons of families, who were mostly Franco-Mauritian descendants. Ultimately, the college obtained an exemption from Rome. A few years later, the Brothers opened the school to Creole (Note: Coloured boys were freely admitted starting in 1929.) (descendants of African and Malagasy mixed-race) and Chinese (Note: Chinese descendants began to convert massively to Catholicism.) communities, as well as a few converted Indo-Mauritians, promoting harmonious coexistence of communities. Since its foundation, the college has had a sports tradition with fields and a gymnasium, and a musical tradition thanks to Brother Léonien-Marie, whose student harmony band (from 1878 to 1907) was famous throughout the island. This tradition continues today.

In 1927, the administrative commission of Curepipe, (Note: The city did not have a municipality then but an administrative commission appointed by the colonial government and composed of local dignitaries. This changed in 1950.) chaired by Mr. Émile Pitot, deemed the buildings outdated and damaged by the last tropical cyclone. With the help of a government loan of 300,000 rupees, the college was reconstructed starting in 1929 with modern facilities of the time. The doors, windows, partitions, and stairs were made of teak imported from Singapore. The new chapel (Note: The first stone was blessed by Canon Alfred Martin on April 6, 1929.) was consecrated by Bishop Leen, Bishop of Mauritius, on November 17, 1933. The architect of the new college was Mr. Max Boullé, (Note: A former student of the Brothers, his sons were schooled there, and one of them would be the college chaplain from 1959 to 1964) and the director of works was Mr. Joseph Tomi. (Note: A Frenchman established in Curepipe, he married a Mauritian.)

An annex for physics-chemistry and natural sciences laboratories was built in 1939, and a commercial section opened the same year. In November 1939, the authorities partially requisitioned the college due to World War II measures, using it as a military hospital under the Red Cross administration. Classes continued until 1942, sharing facilities with Royal College Curepipe (which was requisitioned), before the Brothers had to move to a rented house on Le Clézio Street.

St. Joseph's College returned to its premises in June 1946, after repairs necessitated by the three tropical cyclones of 1945. The director at the time (who arrived in 1913 in Mauritius and had been director since 1934), Brother Ignace, (Note: Born Johann Schmitz in Bavaria) was of German nationality. Despite his deep attachment to his new country, he was arrested in 1940 but released a few hours later on the condition that he resign and remain confined to the college. He was the only German teacher allowed to teach children of an allied nation at the time, owing to his great prestige on the island. He had opened the college to coloured boys twelve years earlier. After the war, a higher level of English was required (French was taught in primary and partially in secondary), and the Brothers and teachers from France, Réunion, and Mauritius had to pass higher British exams. The college became affiliated with an Irish province of the congregation. Irish Brothers brought new impetus to the college, and the last Francophone teachers left in 1948.

The new gymnasium was inaugurated in 1970 by Bishop Jean Margéot, the new Bishop of Mauritius. Laypeople increasingly took over due to the lack of vocations and the promotion of the laity. The last Irish Brother left the institution in 1986, and it has since been administered by the diocese. The first lay principal, Mr. Daniel Kœnig, a former student of the 1951 class, was appointed in 1985, followed by Mr. Serge Ng Tat Chung (Note: Decorated by the President of the Republic with the Order of the Star and Key of the Indian Ocean in 2009) in 1992.

== Today ==
In recent years, the college has successfully embraced modern methods. Since the 1970s, the Mauritian government has contributed to supporting private Catholic and other denominational schools on the island. Since 1977, the curriculum and schooling have been supervised by a commission of the Ministry of Education. Mauritius was the first African country to offer free education to all its secondary and tertiary students. The college then opened to boys from non-Catholic families (mainly Hindu). Education is provided in both English and French. A computer class was inaugurated in 1999 at the Saint-John Baptist de La Salle computer space. A new computer lab with an audio-video and digital research center was inaugurated in 2011.

Primary students are admitted to the college with a minimum of twenty-two units achieved. The college has two football fields, three basketball courts, eight volleyball courts, a gymnasium, a tennis court, and an amphitheater.

The current principal is Mrs.Natalie Catian , and the manager is Mr Tadbois.

== Notable alumni ==
- Max Boullé, painter and architect
- Marc Daruty de Grandpré, architect
- Vishnu Lutchmeenaraidoo, Minister of Finance
- Amédée Maingard, resistance fighter and businessman
- Haresh Sapra, Professor of Accounting, The University of Chicago
- Jim Seetaram, Minister
- Bernard Sik Yuen, Minister of Justice
- Michaël Sik Yuen, Minister
- Joël Rault, Ambassador of Mauritius to France
- Juan Pierre, Researcher & Policymaker

== Bibliography ==
- Charles Giblot-Ducray, Histoire de la ville de Curepipe, île Maurice, éditions Esclapon, 1957
