= Saint Joseph Academy =

Saint Joseph Academy or similar may refer to:

== India ==
- St Joseph's Academy, Dehradun, Uttarakhand

== Philippines ==
- Saint Joseph's Academy (Las Piñas)
- Saint Joseph's Academy (Mandaue, Cebu)

== United Kingdom ==
- Saint Joseph's Academy, Kilmarnock

== United States ==
- Saint Joseph Academy (San Marcos, California)
- St. Joseph Academy (St. Augustine area, Florida)
- St. Joseph's Academy, now St. Theresa School (Coral Gables, Florida)
- St. Joseph's Academy (Baton Rouge), Louisiana
- Saint Joseph's Academy (Saint Paul, Minnesota)
- St. Joseph's Academy (St. Louis), Missouri
- St. Joseph Academy (New Jersey), Hammonton, New Jersey
- Academy of Saint Joseph in Brentwood, New York
- Saint Joseph Academy (Cleveland, Ohio)
- Saint Joseph Academy (Brownsville, Texas)
- St. Joseph's Academy (Laredo, Texas)

== See also ==
- Mount Saint Joseph Academy (disambiguation)
