= Saint Joseph, Ohio =

Saint Joseph or St. Joseph may refer to the following unincorporated places in the U.S. state of Ohio:

- Saint Joseph, Mercer County, Ohio
- Saint Joseph, Portage County, Ohio

== See also ==
- Saint Joseph (disambiguation)
