= St. Joseph Township, Minnesota =

St. Joseph Township is the name of some places in the U.S. state of Minnesota:

- St. Joseph Township, Kittson County, Minnesota
- St. Joseph Township, Stearns County, Minnesota

== See also ==
- St. Joseph Township (disambiguation)
