= St. Joseph the Worker (disambiguation) =

St. Joseph the Worker is both a title and a feast of Saint Joseph. It may also refer to:

- Co-Cathedral of St. Joseph the Worker (Fagatogo, American Samoa)
- St. Joseph the Worker Church (Macau), China
- St. Joseph the Worker Cathedral, Raiganj, India
- San Giuseppe Lavoratore, Alcamo, Italy
- Saint Joseph the Worker Parish Church (Floridablanca), Philippines
- St. Joseph the Worker Cathedral, Nueva Ecija, Philippines
- St. Joseph the Worker Cathedral, Tagbilaran, Philippines
- St. Joseph the Worker Chapel, Victorias, Philippines
- Church of St. Joseph, Craftsman, Bydgoszcz, Poland
- St. Joseph the Worker Church, Gros Islet, Saint Lucia
- St. Joseph's the Worker Church (Belgrade), Serbia
- Saint Joseph the Worker Catholic Church (Dubuque, Iowa), United States
- Cathedral of Saint Joseph the Workman, La Crosse, Wisconsin, United States

== See also ==
- Saint Joseph (disambiguation)
- List of churches dedicated to Saint Joseph
- St. Joseph's Cathedral
