= Church of Our Lady Queen of Poland, Bydgoszcz =

20th-century Catholic church in Bydgoszcz, Poland

Coordinates: 53°05′28″N 18°07′58″E

Church of Our Lady Queen of Poland
- Polish: Kościół Matki Bożej Królowej Polski w Bydgoszczy
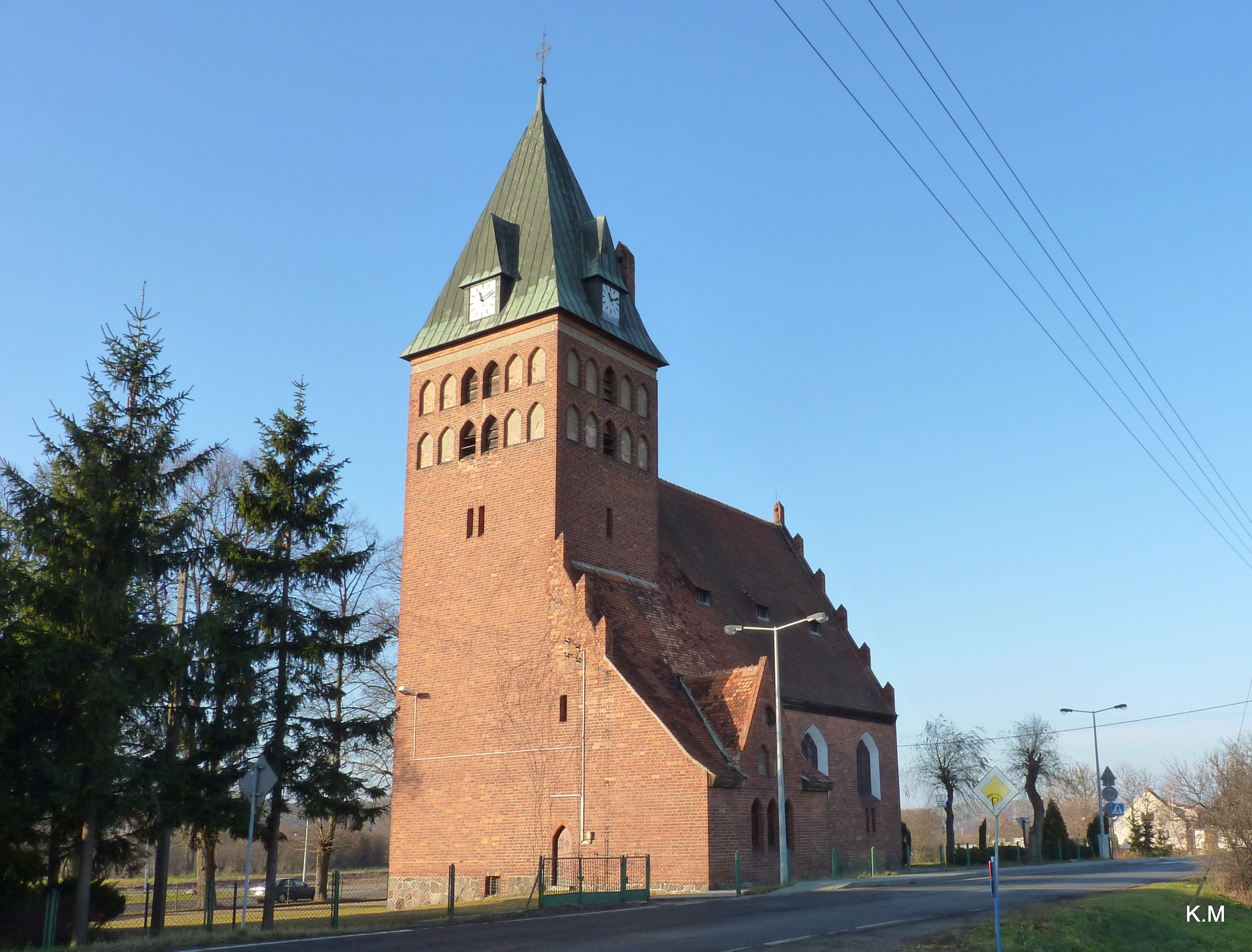
- Church of Our Lady Queen of Poland, Bydgoszcz
- Church of Our Lady Queen of Poland
- Location: 428 Toruńska street, Bydgoszcz
- Country: Poland
- Denomination: Catholic Church

History
- Status: Church
- Dedication: The Most Holy Virgin Mary, Queen of Poland
- Dedicated: 1945

Architecture
- Functional status: Active
- Heritage designation: Nr. A/1746, 13 September 2019
- Architectural type: Neo-Gothic
- Completed: 1911

Specifications
- Materials: brick

The Church of Our Lady Queen of Poland is a Catholic church in Bydgoszcz, Poland. It is located at 428 Toruńska Street in the district of Łęgnowo-Wieś.

It stands on the grounds of the old village of Plątnowo, 1 kilometre (0.62 mi) from the Vistula river, at the southeastern tip of the territory of Bydgoszcz city. The building has been registered on the Kuyavian–Pomeranian Voivodeship Heritage list since 13 September 2019 (Nr. A/1746).

== History ==
=== Evangelical temple ===
The construction of the church took place against the backdrop of the intensive development of Evangelical religious architecture in Prussian Bydgoszcz (Bromberg) and its vicinity at the end of the 19^{th} century. At that time, eight Evangelical-Unionist churches have been erected built in the area, mostly in the Neo-Gothic style, with their distinctive red brick facades.

In the vicinity, one can also mention the similar case of the former Evangelical-Union temple at 166 Toruńska street, today's Church of St. Joseph, Craftsman.

The Evangelical-Unionist community in the villages south of Bromberg (Łęgnowo, Plątnowo, Otorowo) existed before 1885 as Lutherans, lived in the area as early as the 18^{th} century. The village of Plątnowo (Neu-Flötenau) received its own pastor in May 1869; in 1890, he resided in the newly built rectory.

At the beginning of the 20^{th} century, the local Protestant community obtained permission to build its own temple. The construction and furnishing of the church were carried out in 1910-1911. The plot of land was adjacent to the pastor's rectory. Concurrently, an Evangelical cemetery was established and attached to the church (non existent today).

The church served the Evangelical-Union community (mostly Germans) until 1945, although the best years for the parish and its congregation ended with the outbreak of World War I. The pastor's house was demolished by Germans in 1939.

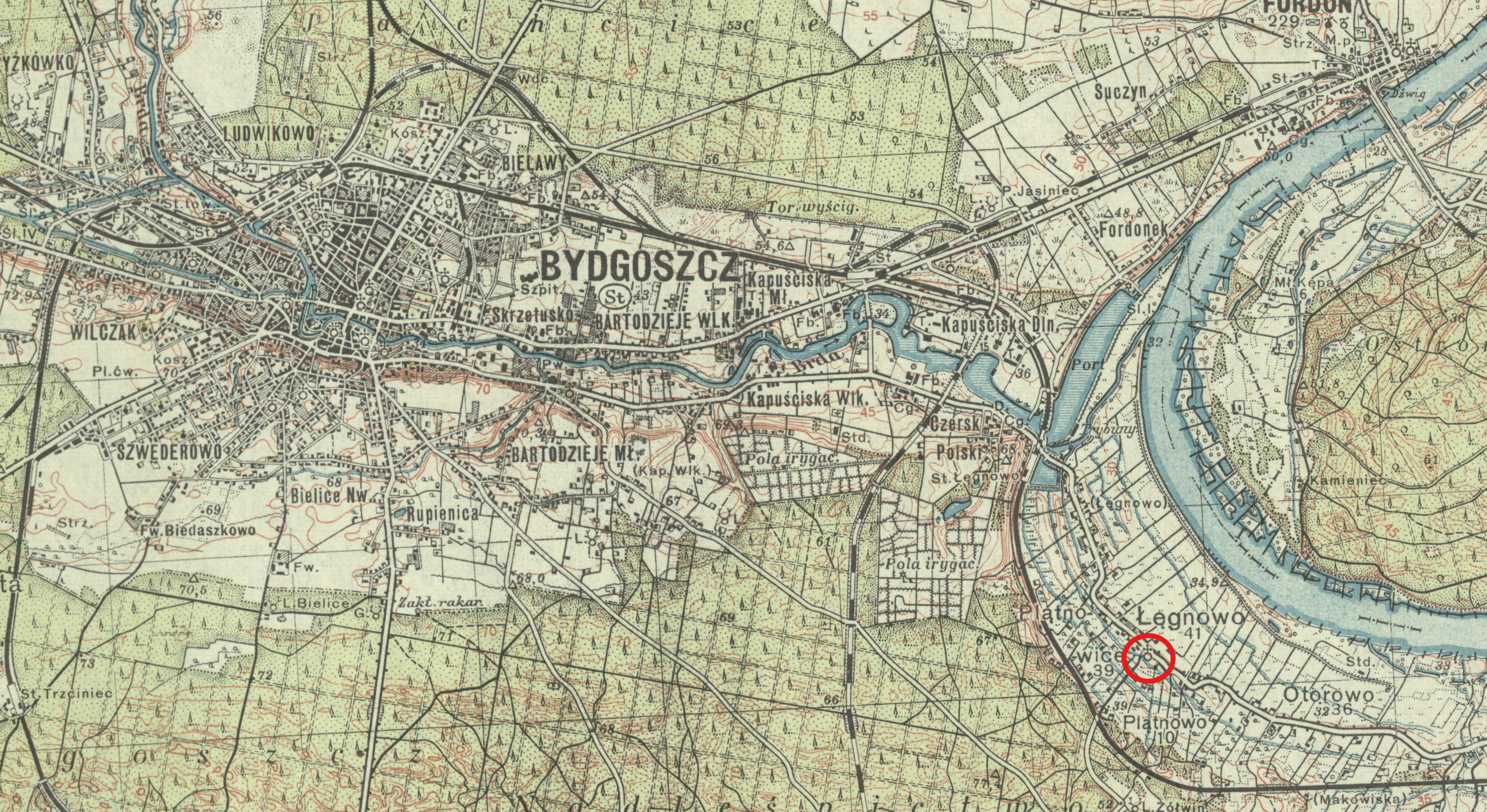
The church on a 1935 map of Bydgoszcz

=== Catholic church ===
Near the end of World War II, on 17 February 1945, a letter from the Starosta of the local Powiat transferred the management of the church to the Solec Kujawski parish of Stanislaus of Szczepanów.

On 9 September 1945, the church was consecrated by Father Franciszek Hanelt. It then served from 1945 to 1958 as a filial church of the Solec Kujawski parish. During this period, interiors were adapted for Catholic liturgies.

On 1 July 1958, a pastoral center was established on the territory of Łęgnowo and Plątnowo villages. As such, the church served henceforth the local rural community. The parish of Our Lady Queen of Poland was officially established on 31 May 1968, by Cardinal Stefan Wyszyński.

In 1972–1974, the ruins of the demolished pastor's house were razed down and a rectory was built on the site. The outbuilding (utility rooms) was preserved and converted into a catechetical center. Today, it houses a warehouse for the local Caritas branch of the Diocese of Bydgoszcz.

In 1978, the villages of Łęgnowo and Plątnowo were incorporated into the administrative district of the city of Bydgoszcz.

== Architecture ==
=== Exteriors ===
The church was built in the neo-Gothic style, very popular in Bromberg at the beginning of the 20^{th} century, especially for religious buildings.

Bricks are the main construction element, used in addition for plastered blind traceries. The edifice has a single nave, with a square, closed chancel, facing east.

The main outside feature of the church is its sturdy tower. Five-story high, it is topped with a hipped roof exhibiting dormers bearing clocks.

The western frontage is decorated with pinnacles and blind traceries.

=== Interiors ===
Inside the church, the wooden upper gallery is still preserved.

The nave displays a wooden barrel vaulted ceiling. The chancel has groin vaults, while the sacristy exposes a simple wooden ceiling.

The pipe organ was built in 1911, by Paul Voelkner from Bydgoszcz. The organ case displays neo-Gothic polychrome details, with tracery motifs.

The tower is lacking its bells: both original ones (from 1832) have been melted down for the WWII war effort.

== Gallery ==
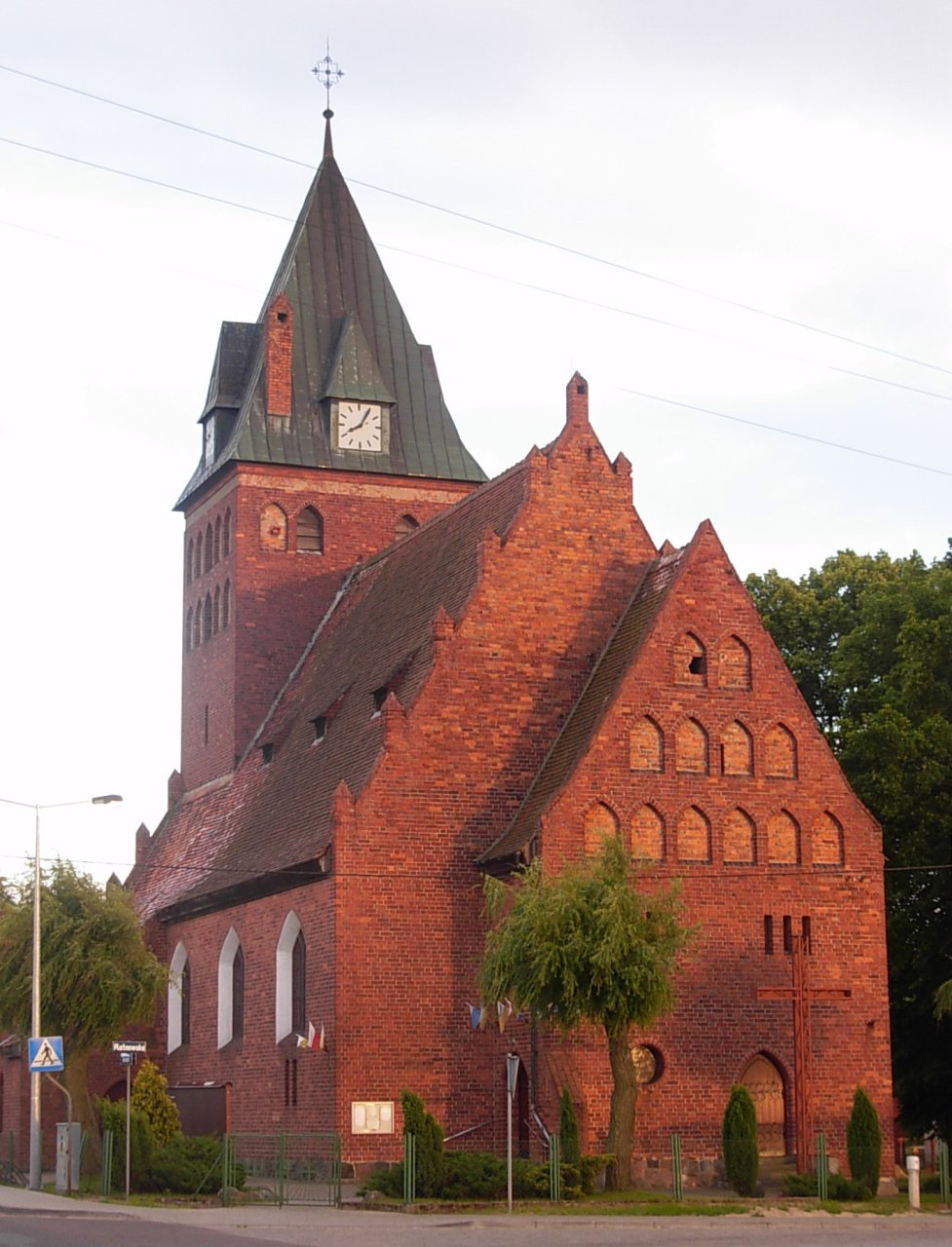
View from Toruńska street

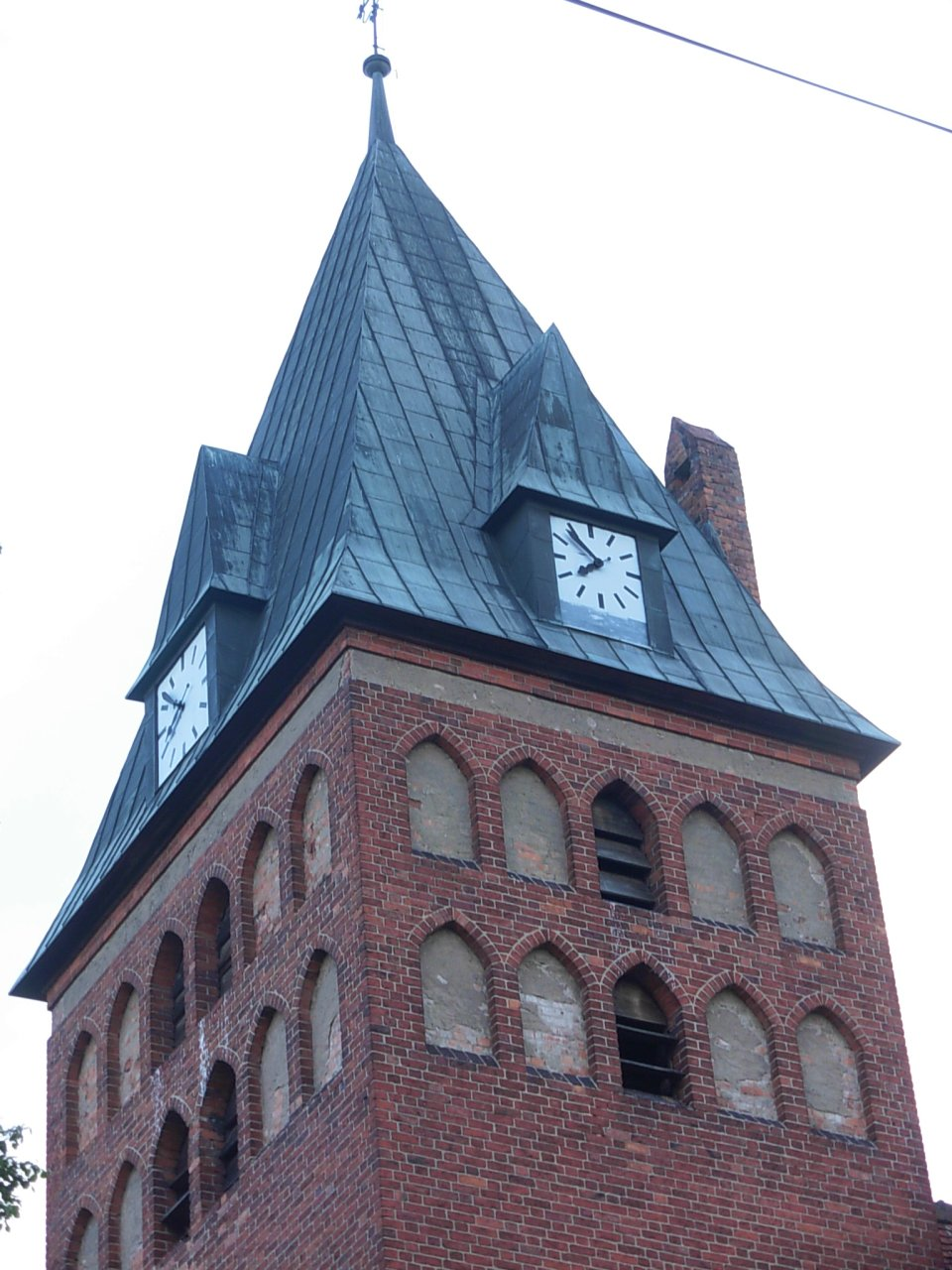
Detail of the steeple

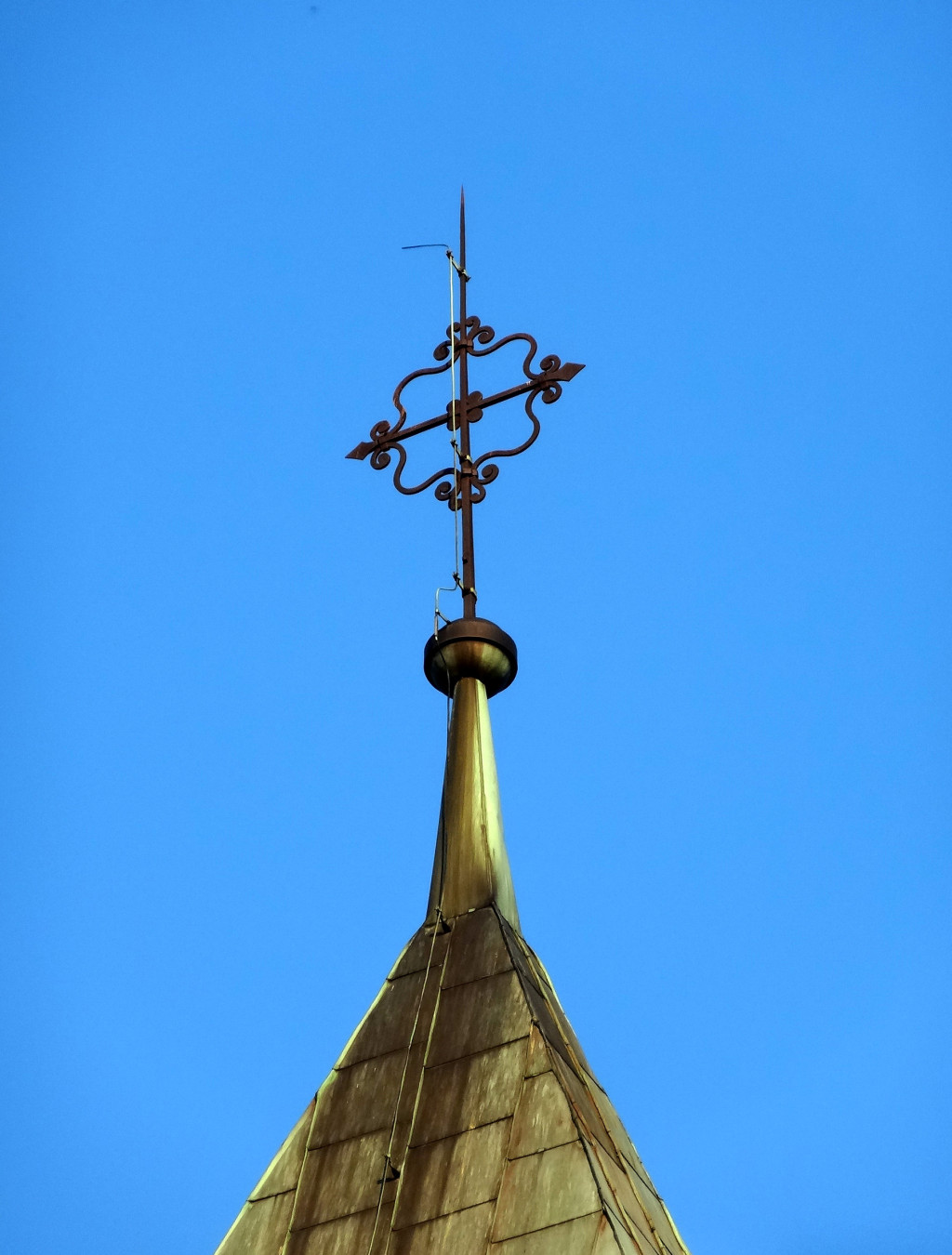
Detail of the weather vane

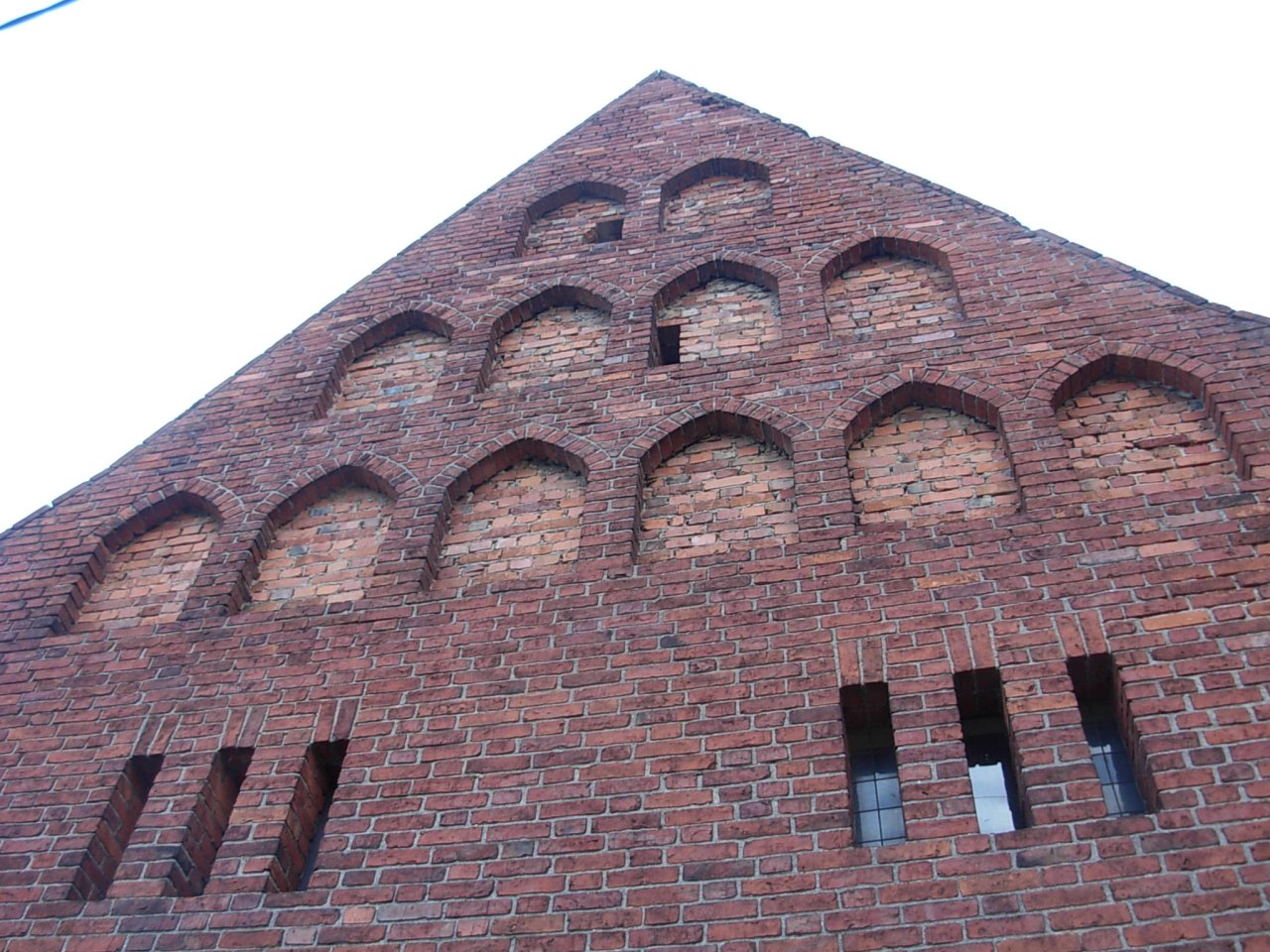
Traceries on the western frontage

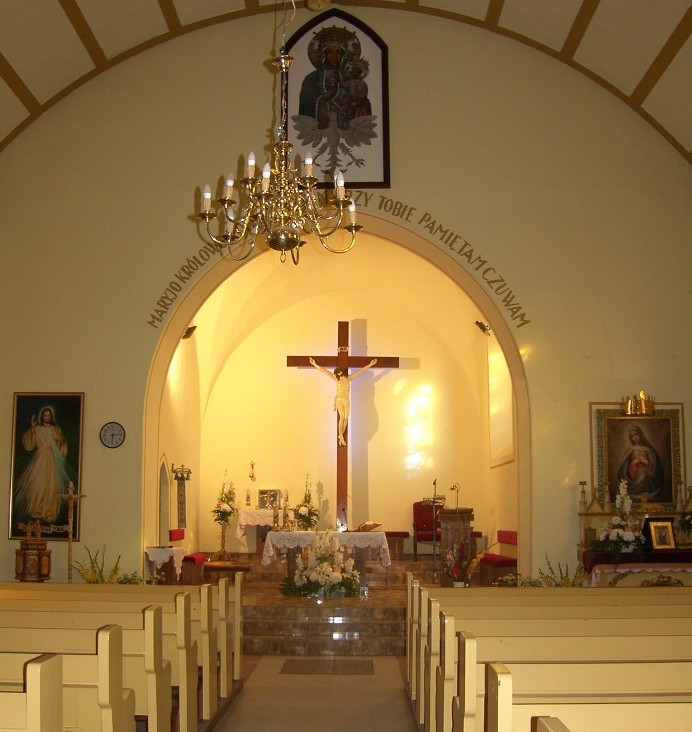
View of the chancel

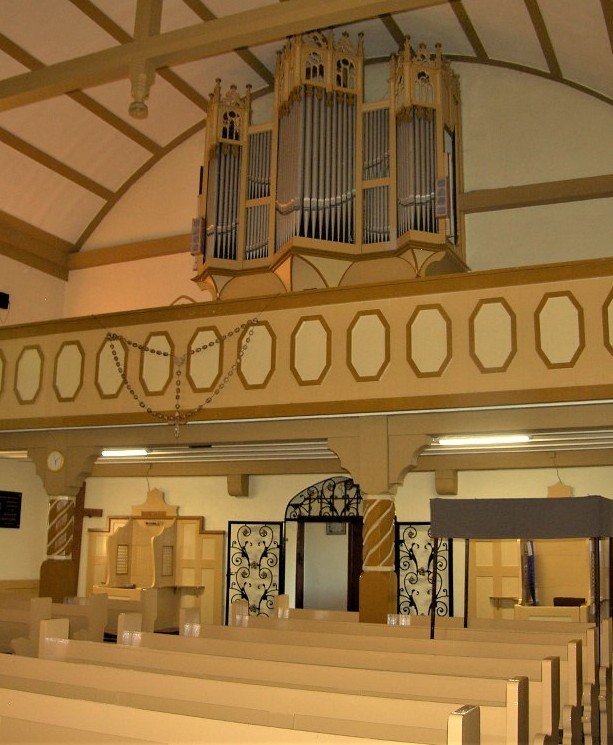
The upper gallery and the pipe organ

== See also ==
- Bydgoszcz
- Toruńska Street, Bydgoszcz
- Church of St. Joseph, Craftsman, Bydgoszcz
- Łęgnowo

== Bibliography ==
- Parucka, Krystyna (2008). Zabytki Bydgoszczy – minikatalog [Monuments of Bydgoszcz – mini-catalogue.] (in Polish). Bydgoszcz: Tifen. ISBN 9788392719106.
- Derenda, Jerzy (2006). Piękna stara Bydgoszcz – tom I z serii Bydgoszcz miasto na Kujawach. Praca zbiorowa [Beautiful Old Bydgoszcz – Volume I of the series Bydgoszcz, a city in Kujawy. Collective work.] (in Polish). Bydgoszcz: Towarzystwo Miłośników Miasta Bydgoszczy.
- Kuberska, Inga (1998). Architektura sakralna Bydgoszczy w okresie historyzmu. Materiały do dziejów kultury i sztuki Bydgoszczy i regionu. Zeszyt 3 [Bydgoszcz's sacred architecture in the historicist period. [century] Materials for the history of culture and art in Bydgoszcz and the region. Issue 3] (in Polish). Bydgoszcz: Wojewódzki Ośrodek Kultury w Bydgoszczy. pp. 61–82.
