= Saint Joseph (disambiguation) =

Saint Joseph is a New Testament figure, the husband of Mary and legal father of Jesus.

Saint Joseph may also refer to:

== In religion ==
- Saint Joseph of Arimathea
- Saint Joseph Marello
- Saint Joseph of Leonessa
- Saint Joseph of Cupertino
- Saint Joseph the Hymnographer
- Saint Joseph Calasanctius
- Saint Joseph Cafasso
- Saint Joseph Cottolengo
- Saint Joseph the Hesychast
- Saint Joseph Busnaya
- Joseph, a priest martyred with Abda and Abdjesus
- Jose Maria Diaz Sanjuro, Joseph Canh Luang Hoang, Joseph Fernandez, Joseph Hien Quang Do, Joseph Khang Duy Nguyen, Joseph Luu Van Nguyen, Joseph Marchand, Joseph Nghi Kim, Joseph Thi Dang Le, Joseph Uyen Dinh Nguyen, Joseph Vien Dinh Dang, Joseph Khang, Joseph Tuc and Joseph Tuan Van Tran of the Vietnamese Martyrs
- Saint Joseph Vaz
- Joseph (Genesis), son of Jacob, typically not given the title saint, but a major figure in the Hebrew Bible and traditionally considered a saint along with other biblical patriarchs

== Geography ==
=== Places ===
==== Canada ====
- Saint-Joseph, New Brunswick, an unincorporated community in Kent County
- Saint-Joseph Parish, New Brunswick, in Madawaska County
  - Saint-Joseph-de-Madawaska, New Brunswick, an unincorporated community therein
- St. Joseph, Antigonish, Nova Scotia in Antigonish County
- St. Joseph, Digby, Nova Scotia in Digby County
- St. Joseph Island (Ontario)
- St. Joseph, Ontario
- Fort St. Joseph (Ontario), former British outpost on St. Joseph Island
- Saint-Joseph, Quebec (disambiguation), several places
- St. Joseph's, Saskatchewan hamlet in south east Saskatchewan
- St. Joseph's Colony, Saskatchewan in west central Saskatchewan

==== France ====
- Saint-Joseph, Loire
- Saint-Joseph, Manche
- Saint-Joseph, Martinique
- Saint-Joseph, Réunion
- Saint-Joseph-de-Rivière, in the Isère département
- Saint-Joseph-des-Bancs, in the Ardèche département
- Saint-Joseph AOC, an Appellation d'Origine Contrôlée in the Rhône wine region

==== United States ====
- Joseph City, Arizona, formerly known as St. Joseph
- St. Joseph, Florida
- Port St. Joe, Florida
- St. Joseph, Pasco County, Florida
- St. Joseph's Colony, in Lake Monroe, Florida
- St. Joseph, Illinois
- Saint Joseph, Floyd County, Indiana
- Saint Joseph, Vanderburgh County, Indiana
- St. Joseph, Iowa
- St. Joseph, Kansas
- St. Joseph, Louisville, Kentucky
- St. Joseph, Louisiana
- St. Joseph, Michigan
- St. Joseph, Minnesota
- St. Joseph, Missouri
- Saint Joseph, Mercer County, Ohio
- Saint Joseph, Portage County, Ohio
- Saint Joseph, Oregon
- Saint Joseph, Tennessee
- St. Jo, Texas
- Saint Joseph, West Virginia
- St. Joseph, Wisconsin

==== Caribbean ====
- Saint Joseph (Trinidad and Tobago)
  - St. Joseph (parliamentary constituency)
- The Parish of Saint Joseph, Barbados
  - Saint Joseph (Barbados Parliament constituency)
- Saint Joseph Parish, Dominica
- Saint-Joseph, Martinique, a commune in Martinique

=== Rivers ===
In the United States:

- St. Joseph River (Lake Michigan) in southwest Michigan and northwest Indiana
- St. Joseph River (Maumee River) in south central Michigan and northeast Indiana

=== Islands ===
- St. Joseph Island (Ontario), a Canadian island in Lake Huron
- Île Saint-Joseph, the southernmost island of the three Îles du Salut in the Atlantic Ocean off the coast of French Guiana
- San José Island (Texas), a barrier island on the Texas coast in the United States, also known as "St. Joseph Island"
- Saint Joseph Island (Seychelles), main island of St. Joseph Atoll, Seychelles

=== Buildings ===
- St. Joseph's Hospital (disambiguation)

==== In Canada ====
- Saint Joseph's Oratory, a Catholic basilica in Montréal, Québec

==== In France ====
- École Saint-Joseph, Solesmes

==== In the United States ====
- Cathedral Basilica of St. Joseph (San Jose), California
- St. Joseph Catholic Church, Detroit, Michigan, a historic parish
- St. Joseph's Catholic Church, a parish located adjacent to the United States Capitol Building in Washington, D.C.
- National Shrine of Saint Joseph (disambiguation)
- Mount Saint Joseph College, a Baltimore Catholic high school
- Saint Joseph Abbey, St. Tammany Parish, Louisiana, listed on the NRHP in Louisiana
- Saint Joseph's University, a Jesuit university in Philadelphia, Pennsylvania

==== In Turkey ====
- St. Joseph High School (Istanbul), a French private school in Turkey

==== In Germany ====
- St. Joseph's Church, Starnberg, a church

=== Other place names ===
In the United States:

- St. Joseph Bay, a bay on the Gulf Coast of Florida
- St. Joseph Peninsula, a peninsula or spit on the Gulf Coast of Florida
- St. Joseph Point, the end of the St. Joseph Peninsula in Florida
- St. Joseph Sound, a bay in Pasco and Pinellas counties, Florida
- St. Joseph Valley Parkway, carrying parts of U.S. Routes 20 and 31

== Other uses ==
- St. Joseph, a brand of aspirin
- Saint Joseph noir, another name for the Italian wine grape San Giuseppe nero
- St. Joseph F.C., an association football club based in Nakuru, Kenya

== See also ==
- List of churches dedicated to Saint Joseph
- Islamic view of Joseph
- Joseph (disambiguation)
- St. Joseph the Worker (disambiguation)
- Saint Joseph's (disambiguation)
- Saint Joseph's College (disambiguation)
- St. Joseph County (disambiguation)
- St. Joseph Seminary (disambiguation)
- St. Joseph Township (disambiguation)
- St. Joe (disambiguation)
- San José (disambiguation)
- San Giuseppe (disambiguation)
