= Kreis Bromberg =

District of Prussia

Coordinates: 53°07′32″N 18°00′21″E

Location of the Bromberg district

The Bromberg district was a Prussian district that existed from 1772 to 1807 and then from 1815 to 1920. It initially belonged to the Netze District and from 1815 it was part of Regierungsbezirk Bromberg in the Grand Duchy of Posen and from 1848, the Prussian Province of Posen. The city of Bromberg (now Bydgoszcz, Poland) was detached from the district and formed its own urban district since 1875. Today, the territory of the district is part of the Kuyavian-Pomeranian Voivodeship in Poland.

== History ==
Since the First Partition of Poland in 1772, the Bromberg district was one of the four districts of the Prussian Netze District. During the Napoleonic Wars, the Bromberg district was ceded by Prussia to the Duchy of Warsaw through the Treaty of Tilsit in 1807.

The entire Netze District was restored to the Kingdom of Prussia at the Congress of Vienna on 15 May 1815. Its southeastern part with the Bromberg district was assigned to Regierungsbezirk Bromberg in the Grand Duchy of Posen which became the Province of Posen in 1848. As part of a first district reform on 1 July 1816, the Bromberg district ceded the city of Exin to the Wirsitz district. In a second district reform on 1 January 1818, the Bromberg district was significantly reduced in size. The towns of Mrotschen, Nakel and their surroundings were transferred to the Wirsitz district, and the towns of Bartschin, Labischin, Rynarschewo and Schubin, together with their surroundings formed the new district of Schubin. Another part of the Bromberg district became part of the district of Inowrazlaw. Since then, the district of Bromberg included Bromberg, Fordon, Polnisch Krone and Schulitz. The district office was set up in Bromberg.

As part of the Province of Posen, the district of Bromberg became part of the newly founded German Empire on 18 January 1871. On 29 May 1875 the city of Bromberg was detached from the Bromberg district and formed its own urban district (Stadtkreis Bromberg). The remainder of the district came to be known as Landkreis Bromberg.

On 27 December 1918 the Greater Poland uprising began in the province of Posen, but the district of Bromberg remained under German control. On 16 February 1919 an armistice ended the Polish-German fighting, and on 28 June 1919 the German government had to cede the district of Bromberg and the predominantly German-populated city of Bromberg to Poland as part of the provisions of the Treaty of Versailles. On 25 November 1919 Germany and Poland concluded an agreement on the evacuation of state facilities and the transfer of the areas to be ceded, which was ratified on 10 January 1920. The state facilities were evacuated and handed over to Poland between 17 January and 4 February 1920. The city of Bromberg, known in Polish as Bydgoszcz was handed over to Poland on 19 January 1920.

=== Interwar Period ===
The district of Bromberg continued in Poland as Powiat Bydgoski (Bydgoszcz County). In 1920, 16 small villages were transferred from the Powiat to the city of Bydgoszcz. On 1 April 1938 the Bydgoszcz county moved from the Poznań Voivodeship to the Pomeranian Voivodeship. In 1921, Bydgoszcz county had 140,263 inhabitants, of which 14% were Germans and 86% were Poles. The city of Bydgoszcz itself had 87,643 inhabitants, of which 27% were Germans and 73% were Poles. In 1931, only 10% of the city's population were Germans.

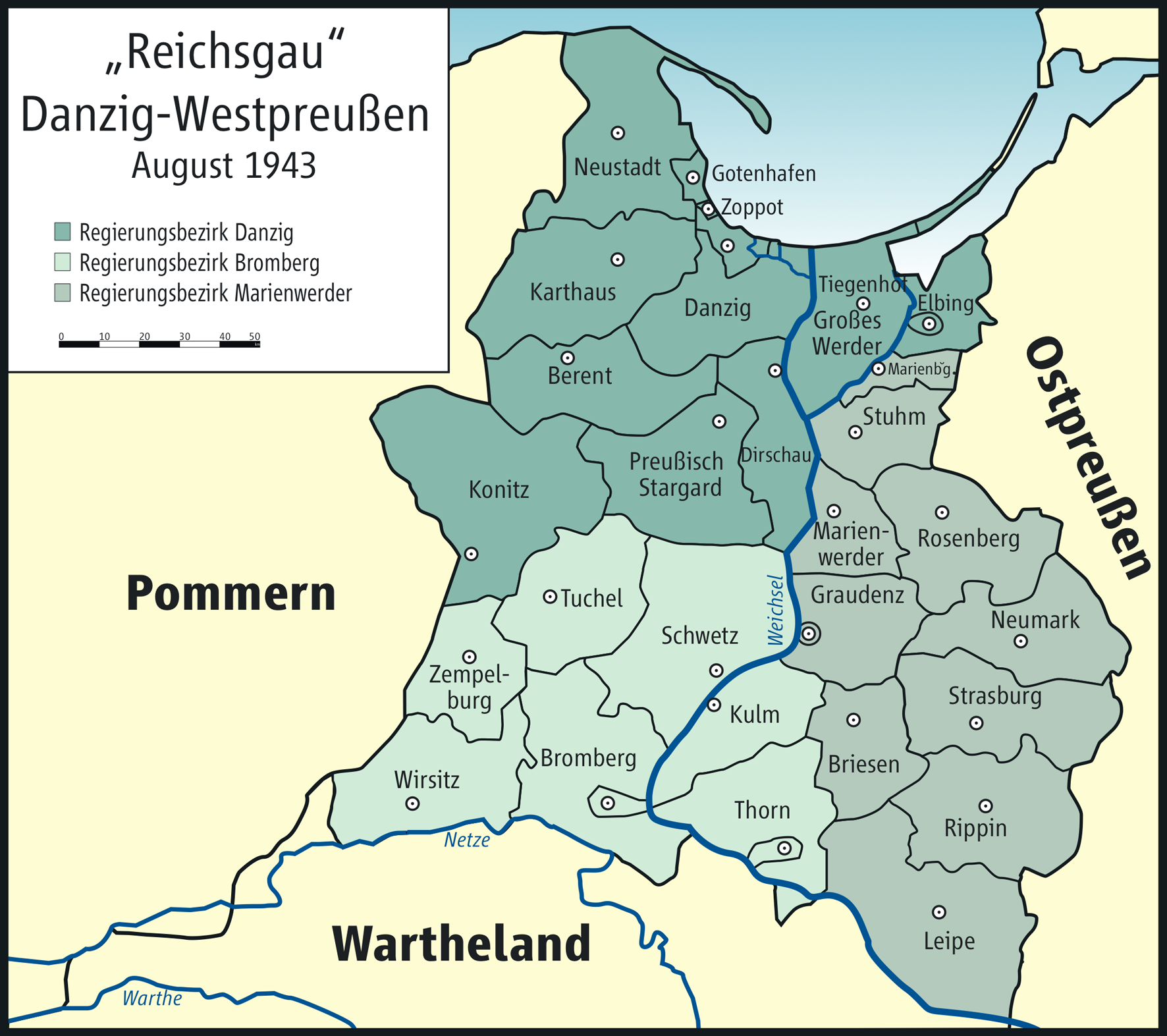
Reichsgau Danzig-West Prussia

=== Bromberg district in Occupied Poland (1939-1945) ===
After the German Invasion of Poland in 1939, the area of the Bromberg district was annexed by Nazi Germany into Reichsgau Danzig-West Prussia and the Bromberg district was re-established. At the beginning of World War II, there were clashes between the German minority and Polish armed forces in the area, and several hundred people were killed on Bloody Sunday. After the invasion of the Wehrmacht, members of the German minority formed paramilitary units, called the Volksdeutscher Selbstschutz, led by the SS and Gestapo, and committed mass murder of the Polish population. According to Polish sources, around 5,000 Poles were killed at Fordon, and a total of 37,000 Polish residents of the city of Bydgoszcz lost their lives by the end of the war.

In 1941, the district of Bromberg had 54,949 inhabitants, the city of Bromberg itself had 144,252 inhabitants. On 1 January 1945 the district comprised three cities and 114 municipalities. At the end of World War II, numerous German residents fled west. In January 1945 the district was occupied by the Red Army and was restored to Poland.

== Demographics ==
According to the Prussian census of 1849, the district of Bromberg (which then also included the city of Bromberg) had a population of 56,972, of whom 25,374 (44.5%) were Germans and 31,598 (55.5%) were Poles or Polish-German bilinguals. In 1910 the city of Bromberg (Stadtkreis Bromberg) was over 80% German, while Landkreis Bromberg had a German majority of around 61%. With the transfer of the district to Poland in 1920, most of the German population emigrated, due to which the district and the city had a Polish majority by 1921.

Ethnolinguistic structure of Landkreis Bromberg
Year	Population	German		Polish / Bilingual / Other	
1834	43,315	21,279	49.1%	22,036	50.9%
1849	56,972	25,374	44.5%	31,598	55.5%
1910	96,473	58,783	60.9%	37,690	39.1%

== Communities ==
The data in the tables below was extracted from the 1905 Prussian gazetteer Gemeindelexikon für das Königreich Preußen.

Stadtkreis Bromberg

Town	Polish Spelling	Type	1905 Pop				Civil Ofc	Police Ofc	Court Ofc	Cath. Ch	Prot. Ch	Notes	More
Town	Polish Spelling	Type	Total	Prot.	Cath.	Jews	Civil Ofc	Police Ofc	Court Ofc	Cath. Ch	Prot. Ch	Notes	More
Bromberg	Bydgoszcz	Town	54231	36143	15955	1513	Bromberg	Bromberg	Bromberg	Bromberg	Bromberg		

Landkreis Bromberg

Town	Polish Spelling	Type	1905 Pop				Civil Ofc	Police Ofc	Court Ofc	Cath. Ch	Prot. Ch	Notes	More
Town	Polish Spelling	Type	Total	Prot.	Cath.	Jews	Civil Ofc	Police Ofc	Court Ofc	Cath. Ch	Prot. Ch	Notes	More
Adlig Kruschin		Estate	201	152	88	0	Pawlowke	Bromberg II (Okollo)	Bromberg	Neuheim	Schleusenau		
Alexandrowo		Village	65	0	65	0	Dobsch	Zolondowo	Bromberg	Fordon	Fordon		
Alt Flötenau		Village	79	79	0	0	Bromberg (L2)	Schulitz	Bromberg	Schulitz	Otteraue Langenau		
Althof	Starydwór	Village	386	203	183	0	Althof	Althof	Krone	Krone	Krone		
Augustwalde		Estate	59	3	56	0	Fordon	Zolondowo	Bromberg	Osielsk	Osielsk		
Backwitz		Village	354	297	57	0	Hohenfelde	Königlich Wierzchucin	Krone	Mrotschen	Lindenwald		
Bartelsee Oberförsterei		Estate	58	54	4	0	Klein Bartelsee	Schulitz	Bromberg	Bromberg	Klein Bartelsee		
Bergfeld	Trzemiętówko	Village	167	158	9	0	Hohenfelde	Wilhelmsort	Bromberg	Byschewo	Wilhelmsort		
Birkhausen	Wilcze	Estate	34	12	22	0	Fordon	Zolondowo	Bromberg	Osielsk	Osielsk		
Bleichfelde	Bielawy pod Bydgoszczą	Village	1438	730	680	0	Bromberg (L3)	Bromberg III (Fordon)	Bromberg	Bromberg	Bromberg		
Blumweise		Estate	39	5	34	0	Dobsch	Zolondowo	Bromberg	Osielsk	Wtelno		
Brahnau	Czersk	Village	486	406	80	0	Bromberg (L2)	Schulitz	Bromberg	Bromberg	Otteraue Langenau		
Brahrode		Village	56	13	43	0	Monkowarsk	Krone	Krone	Monkowarsk	Monkowarsk		
Burowno		Estate	97	24	73	0	Dobsch	Zolondowo	Bromberg	Dobsch	Sienno Klarhrheim		
Buschkowo	Buszkowo	Village	424	182	240	0	Althof	Krone	Krone	Byschewo	Krone		
Byschewo	Byszewo	Village	160	9	151	2	Hohenfelde	Königlich Wierzchucin	Krone	Byschewo	Gogolin		
Bösendorf	Zławieś	Village	110	83	27	0	Dobsch	Zolondowo	Bromberg	Dobsch	Fordon		
Böthkenwalde	-	Village	178	148	30	0	Althof	Krone	Krone	Wtelno	Krone		
Cielle	Ciele	Village	297	297	0	0	Bromberg (L1)	Bromberg I	Bromberg	Bromberg	Cielle		
Cierplewo		Village	247	89	158	0	Althof	Krone	Krone	Schirotzken	Krone		
Czarnowke Dorf	Czarnowek	Village	264	176	80	0	Bromberg (L2)	Bromberg III (Fordon)	Bromberg	Osielsk	Fordon		
Czarnowke Kolonie	Kolonia Czarnowek	Village	46	39	3	0	Bromberg (L2)	Bromberg III (Fordon)	Bromberg	Osielsk	Osielsk		
Deutsch Fordon		Village	478	455	23	0	Bromberg (L2)	Bromberg III (Fordon)	Bromberg	Fordon	Fordon		
Deutsch Kruschin		Village	331	336	45	0	Bromberg (L1)	Bromberg I	Bromberg	Bromberg	Cielle		
Dobsch	Dobrcz	Village	365	64	291	10	Dobsch	Zolondowo	Bromberg	Dobsch	Sienno Klarhrheim		
Drewze	Drzewce	Village	156	147	9	0	Fuchsschwanz	Bromberg I	Bromberg	Bromberg	Lochowo		
Dzidno	Dziedno	Village	403	168	235	0	Monkowarsk	Königlich Wierzchucin	Krone	Monkowarsk	Monkowarsk		
Dzidzinek		Village	283	18	265	0	Monkowarsk	Königlich Wierzchucin	Krone	Monkowarsk	Monkowarsk		
Elsendorf	Dąbrowa wielka	Village	462	461	1	0	Kirschgrund	Schulitz	Bromberg	Lischkowo	Elsendorf		
Falkenburg	Jastrzębie	Estate	135	108	27	0	Fordon	Zolondowo	Bromberg	Osielsk	Osielsk		
Feyerland		Village	214	208	6	0	Schulitz	Schulitz	Bromberg	Schulitz	Otteraue Langenau		
Fordon	Fordon	Town	2785	1519	1055	204	Fordon	Fordon	Krone	Fordon	Fordon		
Freidorf	Wierzchucin szlachecki	Village	179	128	51	0	Hohenfelde	Wilhelmsort	Krone	Byschewo	Gogolin		
Frieddorf	Ugoda	Village	138	48	90	0	Fuchsschwanz	Wilhelmsort	Bromberg	Slesin	Wilhelmsort		
Friedingen		Estate	248	146	102	0	Dobsch	Zolondowo	Bromberg	Rasmushausen	Sienno Klarhrheim		
Fuchsschwanz	Lisi Ogon	Village	150	126	24	0	Fuchsschwanz	Bromberg I	Bromberg	Bromberg	Lochowo		
Fünfeichen		Estate	52	0	52	0	Hohenfelde	Königlich Wierzchucin	Krone	Königlich Wierzchucin	Lindenwald		
Glinke Oberförsterei	Glinki Stare	Estate	177	148	29	0	Klein Bartelsee	Bromberg I	Bromberg	Bromberg	Bromberg		
Gogolin	Gogolin	Village	308	264	44	0	Hohenfelde	Krone	Krone	Byschewo	Gogolin		
Gogolinke	Gogolinek	Village	217	164	53	0	Hohenfelde	Krone	Bromberg	Byschewo	Gogolin		
Goldfeld		Village	242	111	131	0	Dobsch	Zolondowo	Bromberg	Dobsch	Sienno Klarhrheim		
Goldmark		Village	256	86	170	0	Dobsch	Zolondowo	Bromberg	Dobsch	Sienno Klarhrheim		
Gondes	Gąszcz	Estate	217	47	170	0	Dobsch	Zolondowo	Bromberg	Dobsch	Fordon	(Gondecz)	
Gorsin	Gorzeń	Village	493	326	167	0	Potulice	Bromberg I	Bromberg	Slesin	Nakel		
Goscieradz	Gościeradz	Village	508	46	462	0	Althof	Krone	Krone	Wtelno	Krone		
Grocholl	Grochole	Village	149	32	117	0	Bromberg (L2)	Bromberg III (Fordon)	Bromberg	Osielsk	Osielsk		
Groß Bartelsee	Bartodzieje wielkie	Village	699	439	699	8	Bromberg (L3)	Bromberg III (Fordon)	Bromberg	Bromberg	Bromberg		
Groß Lonsk		Village	496	25	471	0	Schanzendorf	Königlich Wierzchucin	Krone	Groß Lonsk	Monkowarsk		
Groß Neudorf	Nowawieś wielka	Village	399	374	25	0	Groß Neudorf	Schulitz	Bromberg	Penchowo	Groß Neudorf		
Groß Schittno		Village	137	86	51	0	Wilhelmsort	Wilhelmsort	Bromberg	Neuheim	Wilhelmsort		
Groß Wudschin	Wudzyn	Village	543	40	503	0	Dobsch	Zolondowo	Bromberg	Groß Wudschin	Sienno Klarhrheim		
Großwalde		Village	280	279	1	0	Schulitz	Schulitz	Krone	Schulitz	Schulitz		
Grünberg		Village	472	182	290	0	Wilhelmsort	Wilhelmsort	Bromberg	Neuheim	Wilhelmsort		
Grünwalde	Piecki	Village	87	82	5	0	Bromberg (L1)	Schulitz	Bromberg	Liebensee	Hopfengarten		
Gumnowitz	Gumnowice	Estate	130	56	74	0	Wilhelmsort	Wilhelmsort	Bromberg	Slesin	Mrotschen		
Haltenau	Trzemiętowo	Village	494	178	307	0	Hohenfelde	Wilhelmsort	Bromberg	Byschewo	Wilhelmsort		
Hammer		Village	242	161	149	0	Dobsch	Zolondowo	Bromberg	Zolondowo	Osielsk		
Hoheneiche	Osowa Góra	Estate	135	120	15	0	Pawlowke	Bromberg II (Okollo)	Bromberg	Neuheim	Schleusenau		
Hohenfelde	Wierzchucin	Estate	205	96	109	0	Hohenfelde	Wilhelmsort	Krone	Byschewo	Gogolin		
Hohenhausen	Trzebiń	Estate	216	61	155	0	Dobsch	Zolondowo	Krone	Groß Wudschin	Sienno Klarhrheim		
Hohenholm		Village	549	399	306	0	Bromberg (L3)	Bromberg III (Fordon)	Bromberg	Bromberg	Bromberg		
Hopfengarten	Chmielniki	Village	494	276	218	0	Groß Neudorf	Bromberg I	Bromberg	Bromberg	Hopfengarten		
Hutta		Estate	224	132	92	0	Schanzendorf	Königlich Wierzchucin	Krone	Königlich Wierzchucin	Lindenwald		
Huttendorf	Hutnawieś	Village	26	23	3	0	Dobsch	Zolondowo	Bromberg	Dobsch	Fordon		
Jagdschütz Oberförsterei		Estate	158	116	42	0	Bromberg (L3)	Bromberg III (Fordon)	Bromberg	Bromberg	Bromberg		
Jagdshütz	Jachcice	Village	915	723	192	0	Bromberg (L3)	Bromberg III (Fordon)	Bromberg	Bromberg	Bromberg		
Jaruschin	Jarużyn	Village	412	44	364	0	Fordon	Zolondowo	Bromberg	Fordon	Fordon		
Josephinen	Występ	Village	585	377	208	0	Potulice	Bromberg I	Bromberg	Nakel	Nakel		
Jägerhof	Czyżkówko	Village	1806	1398	393	0	Schleusenau	Bromberg II (Okollo)	Bromberg	Bromberg	Schleusenau		
Kanal Kolonie A	Kolonia nad kanałem	Village	482	232	20	0	Pawlowke	Bromberg II (Okollo)	Bromberg	Bromberg	Schleusenau	Alt Cath parish in Fordon; (Canal Colonie)	
Karlsdorf	Kapuścisko małe	Village	335	289	39	1	Bromberg (L2)	Bromberg III (Fordon)	Bromberg	Bromberg	Bromberg	Alt Cath parish in Fordon	
Karolingen		Estate	119	37	82	0	Dobsch	Zolondowo	Bromberg	Fordon	Fordon		
Kirschgrund	-	Village	140	139	1	0	Kirschgrund	Schulitz	Bromberg	Liebensee	Elsendorf		
Kirschgrund Oberförsterei		Estate	97	371	17	0	Groß Neudorf	Schulitz	Bromberg	Liebensee	Elsendorf		
Klahrheim		Estate	371	37	273	0	Dobsch	Zolondowo	Bromberg	Groß Wudschin	Sienno Klarhrheim		
Klein Bartelsee	Bartodzieje małe	Village	2017	1569	440	0	Klein Bartelsee	Bromberg III (Fordon)	Bromberg	Bromberg	Klein Bartelsee		
Klein Lonsk		Village	273	39	234	0	Schanzendorf	Königlich Wierzchucin	Krone	Groß Lonsk	Monkowarsk		
Klein Neudorf	Nowawieś mała	Village	194	194	0	0	Groß Neudorf	Schulitz	Bromberg	Penchowo	Groß Neudorf		
Kleinwalde	Lazin	Village	248	243	5	0	Groß Neudorf	Schulitz	Bromberg	Liebensee	Hopfengarten		
Krompiewo		Village	126	16	110	0	Hohenfelde	Königlich Wierzchucin	Krone	Königlich Wierzchucin	Gogolin		
Krone a. Brahe	Koronowo	Town	5268	1303	3708	252	Krone	Krone	Krone	Krone	Krone	(Kronthal)	
Krossen		Village	312	310	2	0	Kirschgrund	Schulitz	Bromberg	Schulitz	Elsendorf		
Kruschin Kolonie	Kruszyn	Village	167	93	74	0	Pawlowke	Bromberg II (Okollo)	Bromberg	Neuheim	Schleusenau		
Kussowo	Kusowo	Estate	139	140	93	1	Dobsch	Zolondowo	Bromberg	Dobsch	Sienno Klarhrheim		
Königlich Brühlsdorf		Village	318	314	4	0	Groß Neudorf	Schulitz	Bromberg	Penchowo	Groß Neudorf		
Königlich Wierzchucin	Wierzchucin Królewski	Village	604	56	548	0	Hohenfelde	Königlich Wierzchucin	Krone	Königlich Wierzchucin	Gogolin		
Lakomowo		Village	96	19	77	0	Monkowarsk	Königlich Wierzchucin	Krone	Monkowarsk	Monkowarsk		
Laugenau		Village	347	331	16	0	Bromberg (L2)	Schulitz	Bromberg	Bromberg	Otteraue Langenau		
Lindendorf		Village	92	74	18	0	Bromberg (L1)	Bromberg I	Bromberg	Bromberg	Cielle		
Lochowitze	Łochowice	Village	309	217	92	0	Fuchsschwanz	Bromberg I	Bromberg	Bromberg	Lochowo		
Lochowo	Łochowo	Village	738	671	67	0	Fuchsschwanz	Bromberg I	Bromberg	Bromberg	Lochowo		
Ludwigsfelde	Piszczyn	Estate	169	205	115	0	Dobsch	Zolondowo	Krone	Dobsch	Sienno Klarhrheim		
Lutschmin	Lucim	Village	819	90	729	0	Monkowarsk	Königlich Wierzchucin	Krone	Monkowarsk	Monkowarsk		
Magdalenowo		Village	209	75	134	0	Dobsch	Zolondowo	Bromberg	Dobsch	Sienno Klarhrheim		
Marienfelde	Mariampol	Village	435	116	319	0	Fuchsschwanz	Bromberg III (Fordon)	Bromberg	Fordon	Fordon		
Mariensee		Estate	153	169	116	0	Wilhelmsort	Wilhelmsort	Bromberg	Slesin	Mrotschen		
Maxtal	Maksymilianowo	Village	185	127	58	0	Dobsch	Zolondowo	Bromberg	Zolondowo	Osielsk		
Mittenwalde	Dąbrowa mała	Village	191	189	2	0	Kirschgrund	Schulitz	Bromberg	Liebensee	Elsendorf	Alternate Protestant parish = Grünkirsch	
Mochel	Mochle	Village	57	40	17	0	Ossowitz	Wilhelmsort	Bromberg	Neuheim	Wilhelmsort		
Mocheln		Estate	528	120	276	0	Ossowitz	Wilhelmsort	Bromberg	Neuheim	Wtelno		
Monkowarsk	Mąkowarsko	Village	1078	162	916	0	Monkowarsk	Königlich Wierzchucin	Krone	Monkowarsk	Monkowarsk		
Moritzfelde		Village	226	107	119	0	Hohenfelde	Königlich Wierzchucin	Krone	Mrotschen	Mrotschen		
Murowanietz	Murowaniec	Village	404	153	251	0	Fuchsschwanz	Bromberg I	Bromberg	Bromberg	Cielle		
Mühllershof		Village	70	58	12	0	Bromberg (L1)	Bromberg I	Bromberg	Bromberg	Schwedenhöhe		
Mühlthal		Village	238	170	68	0	Thalheim	Bromberg III (Fordon)	Bromberg	Bromberg	Osielsk		
Myslencinek	Myślęcinek	Estate	191	135	88	0	Thalheim	Bromberg III (Fordon)	Bromberg	Osielsk	Osielsk		
Nekla		Village	88	8	80	0	Dobsch	Zolondowo	Bromberg	Zolondowo	Sienno Klarhrheim		
Netzort	Przyłęki	Village	477	299	178	0	Bromberg (L1)	Bromberg I	Bromberg	Bromberg	Cielle		
Neu Beelitz	Bielice	Village	721	391	330	0	Bromberg (L3)	Bromberg II (Okollo)	Bromberg	Bromberg	Bromberg	'Neu Belitz'	
Neu Glinke	Glinki Nowe	Village	256	64	192	0	Althof	Krone	Krone	Schirotzken	Krone		
Neuheim		Estate	158	325	140	1	Ossowitz	Wilhelmsort	Bromberg	Neuheim	Wilhelmsort		
Neuhof	Nowedwór	Village	313	34	279	0	Althof	Krone	Krone	Krone	Krone	(Neuhoff)	
Neumannsdorf		Village	129	99	30	0	Wilhelmsort	Wilhelmsort	Krone	Byschewo	Wilhelmsort		
Neu Flötenau		Village	232	232	0	0	Bromberg (L2)	Schulitz	Bromberg	Schulitz	Otteraue Langenau		
Nieciszewo		Estate	208	107	205	0	Dobsch	Zolondowo	Krone	Schirotzken	Sienno Klarhrheim		
Nieder Strelitz	Strzelce dolne	Village	260	235	25	0	Fordon	Zolondowo	Bromberg	Fordon	Fordon		
Niederhein		Village	94	62	32	0	Fuchsschwanz	Bromberg III (Fordon)	Bromberg	Fordon	Fordon		
Nimtsch	Niemcz	Village	610	295	447	0	Thalheim	Bromberg III (Fordon)	Bromberg	Osielsk	Osielsk		
Niwie		Village	286	71	215	0	Thalheim	Zolondowo	Bromberg	Osielsk	Osielsk		
Ober Strelitz	Strzelce górne	Estate	191	31	169	0	Fordon	Zolondowo	Bromberg	Fordon	Fordon		
Okollo Kolonie	Okole	Village	186	93	153	0	Althof	Krone	Krone	Krone	Krone		
Olschewko		Village	111	42	69	0	Althof	Wilhelmsort	Krone	Krone	Krone		
Oplawitz		Village	242	135	46	0	Schleusenau	Bromberg III (Fordon)	Bromberg	Bromberg	Schleusenau		
Osiek		Village	194	0	194	0	Schanzendorf	Königlich Wierzchucin	Krone	Königlich Wierzchucin	Monkowarsk		
Osielsk	Osielsko	Village	945	173	772	0	Thalheim	Bromberg III (Fordon)	Bromberg	Osielsk	Osielsk		
Ossowitz		Village	59	29	30	0	Ossowitz	Wilhelmsort	Bromberg	Neuheim	Wilhelmsort		
Ossowitz		Estate	163	10	120	0	Ossowitz	Wilhelmsort	Bromberg	Neuheim	Wilhelmsort		
Otteraue	Otorowo	Village	280	255	25	0	Bromberg (L2)	Schulitz	Bromberg	Schulitz	Otteraue Langenau		
Palsch		Village	139	92	47	0	Fordon	Bromberg III (Fordon)	Bromberg	Fordon	Fordon		
Paulinen	Pauliny	Estate	153	668	135	0	Dobsch	Zolondowo	Bromberg	Dobsch	Sienno Klarhrheim	(Pauline)	
Pawlowke	Pawłówek	Village	281	207	74	0	Pawlowke	Bromberg II (Okollo)	Bromberg	Neuheim	Schleusenau		
Potulitz	Potulice	Estate	342	16	325	0	Potulice	Bromberg I	Bromberg	Slesin	Nakel		
Prinzenthal	Wilczak wielki	Village	4861	3191	1634	0	Prinzenthal	Bromberg II (Okollo)	Bromberg	Bromberg	Prinzenthal		
Prondtke	Prądki	Village	54	54	2	0	Bromberg (L1)	Bromberg I	Bromberg	Bromberg	Cielle		
Prondy	Prądy	Village	455	387	68	0	Fuchsschwanz	Bromberg I	Bromberg	Bromberg	Lochowo		
Rohrbeck	Krąpiewo	Estate	151	44	107	0	Hohenfelde	Königlich Wierzchucin	Krone	Königlich Wierzchucin	Gogolin		
Rosengrund Oberförsterei	Różana	Estate	130	93	31	0	Althof	Krone	Krone	Krone	Krone		
Ruden	Rudy	Estate	44	34	10	0	Schulitz	Schulitz	Bromberg	Schulitz	Schulitz	(Ruhden)	
Salno		Village	294	29	265	0	Althof	Krone	Krone	Byschewo	Gogolin		
Samsetschno		Village	98	43	55	0	Wilhelmsort	Wilhelmsort	Bromberg	Slesin	Mrotschen		
Samsetschno	Samsieczno	Estate	718	50	668	0	Wilhelmsort	Wilhelmsort	Bromberg	Slesin	Mrotschen		
Sanddorf		Village	411	72	339	0	Althof	Krone	Krone	Krone	Krone	'sand village'	
Schanzendorf		Village	258	128	130	0	Schanzendorf	Königlich Wierzchucin	Krone	Monkowarsk	Monkowarsk		
Schleusenau	Wilczak	Village	6551	4445	2048	0	Schleusenau	Bromberg II (Okollo)	Bromberg	Bromberg	Schleusenau		
Schleusendorf		Village	575	490	85	0	Schleusenau	Bromberg I	Bromberg	Bromberg	Prinzenthal		
Schröttersdorf	Szretery	Village	758	593	151	0	Bromberg (L3)	Bromberg III (Fordon)	Bromberg	Bromberg	Bromberg		
Schulitz	Solec	Town	4326	3715	546	65	Schulitz	Schulitz	Bromberg	Schulitz	Schulitz		
Schulitz Oberförsterei	Jeziorze	Estate	34	32	2	0	Schulitz	Schulitz	Bromberg	Schulitz	Schulitz		
Schutki	Szczutki	Village	199	5	194	0	Wtelno	Wilhelmsort	Bromberg	Wtelno	Wtelno		
Schwedenhöhe	Stare Szwederowo / Gorzyszkowo	Village	8019	3583	4389	0	Bromberg (L3)	Bromberg II (Okollo)	Bromberg	Bromberg	Schwedenhöhe	(Adlershorst; Adlerhorst; Gorzyskowo)	
Schöhagen		Village	1118	1021	93	0	Bromberg (L2)	Bromberg III (Fordon)	Bromberg	Bromberg	Klein Bartelsee		
Schönberg		Estate	74	37	37	0	Ossowitz	Wilhelmsort	Bromberg	Neuheim	Wilhelmsort		
Schöndorf	Rupienice	Village	1941	1129	789	0	Klein Bartelsee	Bromberg II (Okollo)	Bromberg	Bromberg	Bromberg		
Schönwalde		Village	56	15	41	0	Wilhelmsort	Wilhelmsort	Bromberg	Neuheim	Wilhelmsort		
Siebenbergen	Siedmiogóry	Village	55	50	5	0	Schulitz	Schulitz	Bromberg	Schulitz	Otteraue Langenau		
Sienno		Estate	336	227	109	0	Dobsch	Zolondowo	Bromberg	Dobsch	Sienno Klarhrheim		
Sittigseichen		Estate	129	114	6	0	Potulice	Wilhelmsort	Bromberg	Slesin	Wilhelmsort		
Skarbiewo		Village	115	27	88	0	Althof	Krone	Krone	Byschewo	Krone		
Slesin	Ślesin	Village	593	52	541	0	Potulice	Wilhelmsort	Bromberg	Slesin	Nakel		
Slesin		Estate	422	88	325	9	Potulice	Wilhelmsort	Bromberg	Slesin	Nakel		
Slupowo		Estate	205	108	97	0	Hohenfelde	Königlich Wierzchucin	Krone	Mrotschen	Mrotschen		
Sophienthal	Zofin	Village	148	87	61	0	Fordon	Bromberg III (Fordon)	Bromberg	Fordon	Fordon		
Steindorf	Makowisko	Village	180	179	1	0	Schulitz	Schulitz	Bromberg	Schulitz	Otteraue Langenau		
Stopka	Stopka	Estate	88	26	62	0	Althof	Königlich Wierzchucin	Krone	Krone	Krone		
Stronnau	Stronno	Village	549	139	406	0	Dobsch	Zolondowo	Krone	Groß Wudschin	Sienno Klarhrheim		
Stronnau Oberförsterei		Estate	68	37	31	0	Althof	Zolondowo	Krone	Groß Wudschin	Sienno Klarhrheim		
Strzelewo		Estate	454	12	442	0	Wilhelmsort	Wilhelmsort	Bromberg	Neuheim	Wilhelmsort		
Sutschin	Suczyn	Village	219	100	119	0	Fordon	Bromberg III (Fordon)	Bromberg	Fordon	Fordon		
Thalheim	Zamczysko	Estate	37	18	19	0	Thalheim	Bromberg III (Fordon)	Bromberg	Osielsk	Osielsk		
Trischin	Tryszczyn	Village	645	195	450	0	Wtelno	Krone	Bromberg	Wtelno	Wtelno		
Wahlstatt		Estate	300	151	149	0	Ossowitz	Wilhelmsort	Bromberg	Neuheim	Wilhelmsort		
Walde		Village	81	37	44	0	Dobsch	Zolondowo	Krone	Dobsch	Sienno Klarhrheim		
Weichselhof		Estate	100	90	10	0	Schulitz	Schulitz	Bromberg	Schulitz	Schulitz		
Weichselthal	Przułubic polskie	Village	346	342	4	0	Schulitz	Schulitz	Bromberg	Schulitz	Schulitz		
Weißfelde		Village	318	285	33	0	Bromberg (L1)	Bromberg I	Bromberg	Bromberg	Cielle		
Wiensowno	Więzowno	Village	423	36	387	0	Althof	Krone	Krone	Byschewo	Krone		
Wilhelmshöhe		Estate	78	29	49	0	Fordon	Bromberg III (Fordon)	Bromberg	Fordon	Fordon		
Wilhelmsort	Sicienko	Village	239	149	90	0	Wilhelmsort	Wilhelmsort	Bromberg	Neuheim	Wilhelmsort		
Wilsche		Village	404	112	292	0	Schanzendorf	Königlich Wierzchucin	Krone	Groß Lonsk	Monkowarsk		
Wiskitno		Village	515	150	365	0	Schanzendorf	Königlich Wierzchucin	Krone	Königlich Wierzchucin	Gogolin		
Witoldowo		Village	435	360	70	0	Hohenfelde	Krone	Krone	Byschewo	Gogolin		
Wluki		Village	275	130	145	0	Dobsch	Zolondowo	Bromberg	Dobsch	Sienno Klarhrheim		
Wtelno		Village	598	153	445	0	Wtelno	Krone	Bromberg	Wtelno	Wtelno		
Wtelno Oberförsterei		Estate	253	167	86	0	Wtelno	Zolondowo	Bromberg	Wtelno	Wtelno		
Wudsinek	Wudzynek	Village	443	59	384	0	Dobsch	Zolondowo	Krone	Groß Wudschin	Sienno Klarhrheim		
Zawada		Village	132	42	90	0	Wilhelmsort	Wilhelmsort	Bromberg	Neuheim	Wilhelmsort		
Zielonke	Zielonka	Village	570	566	4	0	Bromberg (L1)	Bromberg I	Bromberg	Bromberg	Cielle		
Zolondowo	Żołędowo	Village	220	26	191	0	Dobsch	Zolondowo	Bromberg	Zolondowo	Osielsk		
Zolondowo		Estate	363	112	251	0	Dobsch	Zolondowo	Bromberg	Zolondowo	Osielsk		

Hamlets that belonged to other towns or villages. (Notes indicate if residents belonged to parish different from the village that owned it).

Town	Polish Spelling	Type	1905 Pop	Dwellings	Belonged to...	Notes
Anielamühle			9		Potulitz	
Anielin			24		Slesin	Cath=Neuheim
Baumgart			38		Hammer	Prot=Wtelno
Beelitz Forsthaus			10		Glinke Oberförsterei	SA=Bromberg (L3)
Beerenberg			76		Zolondowo	
Beerenberg Forsthaus			9		Wtelno Oberförsterei	Prot=Osielsk; Cath=Zolondowo
Bergheim	Górnik		12		Niederhein	also 'Bergmühle'
Birkenthal Forsthaus	Brzozowo		6		Rosengrund Oberförsterei	Cath=Schirotzken
Bogazin	Bogacin		16		Samsetschno	
Brahthal Försterei			12		Rosengrund Oberförsterei	SA=Monkowarsk
Brenkenhof Abbau	Bocianowo		16		Jagdschütz Oberförsterei	
Brenkenhof Forsthaus	Bocianowo		10		Jagdschütz Oberförsterei	
Bromberger Wasserwerke in Brenkenhof			15		Jagdschütz Oberförsterei	
Brühlsdorf Forsthaus	Ryczywieś		6		Kirschgrund Oberförsterei	Prot=Groß Neudorf; (Brühlendorf)
Buschkowo Kolonie	Buszkowo Kolonia		101		Buschkowo	
Cheltschonka			34		Wluki	
Donnermühle	Grzmotny mlyn		4		Buschkowo	Prot=Monkowarsk
Eichberg			97		Backwitz	Prot=Gogolin; Cath=Byschewo
Eichenau	Dębionka		31		Kirschgrund Oberförsterei	
Eichenau Forsthaus			4		Kirschgrund Oberförsterei	Prot=Groß Neudorf; Cath=Penchowo
Eichenau I			14		Kirschgrund Oberförsterei	
Ellernthal			7		Trischin	
Elsendorf Forsthaus	Dąbrowa		9		Kirschgrund Oberförsterei	SA=Kirschgrund
Emilienau Forsthaus			8		Bartelsee Oberförsterei	Prot=Hopfengarten
Entenpfuhl Forsthaus	Kadzionka		6		Rosengrund Oberförsterei	Prot=Mokowarsk; Cath=Byschewo; (Entenphul)
Falkenburg Forsthaus	Jastrzębie		10		Jagdschütz Oberförsterei	Prot&Cath=Osielsk; SA=Thalheim
Fichtenau	Marcelewo		27		Ludwigsfelde	
Fordonek			250		Fordon	
Franzenhof	Franciszkowo		15		Sienno	(Franzenshoff)
Friedrich Wilhelms Mühle	Otorowski młyn		39		Otteraue	
Gabrielin	-		54		Slesin	
Gogoliner Mühle			36		Gogolin	
Gonzerzewo			120		Samsetschno	Prot=Wilhelmsort
Gorki			145		Netzort	
Grünau	Gronów		14		Glinke Oberförsterei	Prot=Lochowo; SA=Fuchsschwanz
Grünsee Forsthaus	Jezierze		6		Schulitz Oberförsterei	
Grünwerder	Przylęcki ostrów		31		Netzort	
Hammermühle			26		Brahrode	Prot=Wtelno
Hoheneiche Forsterei			7		Jagdschütz Oberförsterei	Prot=Schleusenau; SA=Pawlowke
Hopfengarten Forsthaus			7		Bartelsee Oberförsterei	Prot=Hopfengarten; SA=Groß Neudorf
Hopfenthal	Chmielewo		141		Mocheln	
Janin			53		Strzelewo	
Janowo			36		Trischin	
Jaruschin Kolonie			152		Jaruschin	
Jasinietz			33		Deutsch Fordon	
Jasinietz Abbau bei Fordon			6		Jagdschütz Oberförsterei	
Jasinietz Forsthaus			7		Jagdschütz Oberförsterei	Prot=Fordon; SA=Bromberg (L2)
Jasinietz Haltestelle			3		Jagdschütz Oberförsterei	Prot=Fordon
Jesuitersee Bahnhof	Chmielniki		33		Glinke Oberförsterei	Prot=Cielle; SA=Bromberg (L1)
Jesuitersee Forsthaus	Jasiniec		13		Glinke Oberförsterei	Prot=Cielle; SA=Bromberg (L1)
Johannisberg			24		Neuhof	
Jägerhof Chausseehaus			4		Jagdschütz Oberförsterei	Prot&SA=Schleusenau
Jägerhof Forsthaus			6		Jagdschütz Oberförsterei	Prot&SA=Schleusenau
Kaltwasser	Zimnawoda		218		Schöhagen	
Kaltwasser Forsthaus			5		Bartelsee Oberförsterei	
Kamionka			50		Rosengrund Oberförsterei	(Steinbruch) Prot=Monkowarsk; Cath&Pol=Königlich Wierzchucin
Kanalsgarten			10		Murowanietz	
Karbidwerk			25		Mühlthal	
Karlhof			125		Wudsinek	
Kartschemka			106		Magdalenowo	Cath=Groß Wudschin
Kasprowo			97		Samsetschno	Prot=Wilhelmsort
Kazin			132		Slesin	
Kazmierowo			68		Potulitz	
Kiebitzbruch	Biedaszkowo		11		Glinke Oberförsterei	Prot=Cielle; SA=Bromberg (L1)
Kirschgrund Forsthaus			10		Kirschgrund Oberförsterei	SA=Kirschgrund
Klahrheim Bahnhof			98		Klahrheim	
Klatschkowo			30		Wudsinek	
Klein Bartelsee Forsthaus			9		Bartelsee Oberförsterei	
Klein Bartelsee Waldwärtereigehäft			13		Bartelsee Oberförsterei	
Klein Salvin			15		Alt Flötenau	
Kleinheide Forsthaus			6		Rosengrund Oberförsterei	Prot&Cath&SA=Monkowarsk
Kleinwalde Forsthaus			9		Schulitz Oberförsterei	
Kobelblott Forsthaus			6		Bartelsee Oberförsterei	Prot=Hopfengarten; SA=Bromberg (L1)
Kronprinz Cecilie Heilstätte			85		Wtelno Oberförsterei	
Krossen Forsthaus			6		Schulitz Oberförsterei	Prot=Elsendorf; SA=Kirshgrund
Kuhbrück Försterei	Kr~owka		17		Rosengrund Oberförsterei	Prot&Cath&SA=Monkowarsk
Königlich Neubrück Forsthaus			7		Stronnau Oberförsterei	Cath=Zolondowo
Landwirtschaftliche Versuchsstation			25		Mocheln	
Leschütz	Leszyce		78		Kirschgrund	Cath=Penchowo; (Leschiütz)
Liesendorf	Elźbietowo		7		Potulitz	
Lindau			11		Hohenhausen	
Linowietz			50		Nekla	
Lipie			35		Neuhof	
Lochau Forsthaus	Łochowo		5		Glinke Oberförsterei	Prot=Lochowo; SA=Fuchsschwanz
Lugheide Forsthaus			5		Wtelno Oberförsterei	Cath=Krone; SA=Althof
Marthashausen			126		Trischin	
Marynin			12		Samsetschno	
Maximilianowo Bahnhof			19		Wtelno Oberförsterei	
Maximilianowo Kleinbahnhof			11		Wtelno Oberförsterei	
Michalin			176		Samsetschno	
Mlynek			12		Hammer	
Mochelkenberg	Mochelskagóra		5		Hopfengarten	
Moltkegrube			65		Goscieradz	
Mühlthal Forsthaus			8		Wtelno Oberförsterei	Cath=Zolondowo
Mühlthal Vorwerk			21		Wtelno Oberförsterei	
Müllershof Forsthaus	Biedaszkowo		4		Glinke Oberförsterei	Prot=Schwedenhöhe; SA=Bromberg (L1); (Müllersdorf)
Nekla			100		Zolondowo	
Neubrück Adlig	Mowy mostek		17		Stronnau Oberförsterei	AG=Bromberg
Neudorf			9		Kirschgrund Oberförsterei	Prot=Groß Neudorf
Neuholz	Drzewianowo		88		Netzort	Prot=Hopfengarten
Neurode			54		Mocheln	
Niecponie			36		Palsch	
Niedola			12		Potulitz	
Nordfeld			148		Krone a. Brahe	
Oplawitz Chausseehaus			5		Jagdschütz Oberförsterei	Prot&SA=Schleusenau
Osielsk Parowe			119		Osielsk	
Ostrowo			112		Hammer	Prot=Wtelno
Papiermühle	Papiernik		27		Buschkowo	Cath=Groß Lonsk
Parowe			25		Jaruschin	
Parowo			19		Ober Strelitz	
Patzerie	Pacery		11		Lochowo	
Petatz			9		Potulitz	
Peterhof			96		Mocheln	
Pietschisko			177		Krone a. Brahe	
Potulitz Forsthaus I			9		Potulitz	
Potulitz Forsthaus II			9		Potulitz	
Potulitz Wildpark			16		Potulitz	
Probsteivorwerk			5		Krone a. Brahe	'provost's land outlying farm'
Prosperowo			13		Slupowo	
Prosperowo			13		Slupowo	
Rabenhorst	Stefanowo		48		Byschewo	
Reinershof			17		Krone a. Brahe	
Rinkau Ansiedlung			22		Jagdschütz Oberförsterei	
Rinkau Bahnmeisterei			7		Jagdschütz Oberförsterei	Prot&Cath=Osielsk
Rinkau Forsthaus			7		Jagdschütz Oberförsterei	Prot&Cath=Osielsk; SA=Bromberg (L2)
Ritzkenkrug	Jeruzalem		8		Sophienthal	
Rohrbach Forsthaus			7		Weißfelde	
Rohrbeck Vorwerk			27		Backwitz	
Rohrbruch Haltestelle			4		Glinke Oberförsterei	Prot=Cielle
Rybinietz			26		Niwie	
Salvin Forsthaus			5		Bartelsee Oberförsterei	Prot=Otteraue Langenau
Sandau Forsthaus	Aleksandrowo		8		Stronnau Oberförsterei	Cath=Wudschin
Sanddorf			45		Krone a. Brahe	'sand village'
Schlosskämpe	Kempa zamkowa		12		Deutsch Fordon	Prot&Cath=Ostrometzko; (Schlosskempe)
Schönhagen Forstausiehergehöft			5		Bartelsee Oberförsterei	
Seebruch Forsthaus	Trzcianka		7		Schulitz Oberförsterei	
Seebruch Forsthaus	Trzcianka		38		Großwalde	
Skarbiewo Kolonie			46		Skarbiewo	
Slupowo Mühle			7		Slupowo	
Smolary			67		Wahlstatt	'tar oven'
Stopka Ziegelei	Stopka Cegielnia		11		Stopka	
Strehlau Bahnhof	Strzelewo		4		Grünberg	
Strelitz Forsthaus			25		Wtelno Oberförsterei	Prot=Osielsk; Cath=Zolondowo
Stronnaubrück Forsthaus	Stronno		6		Stronnau Oberförsterei	Cath=Wudschin; ?(Stronoverbrück)
Stryschek Chausseehaus			7		Glinke Oberförsterei	SA=Bromberg (L1)
Stryschek Forsthaus			5		Glinke Oberförsterei	Prot=Hopfengarten; SA=Bromberg (L1)
Strzelewo Vorwerk			45		Strzelewo	
Teresin			149		Samsetschno	
Thiloshöhe Forsthaus	Tylogóra		6		Rosengrund Oberförsterei	
Trischin	Tryszczyn		7		Wtelno Oberförsterei	
Ullrichshof	Ulrychów		36		Krone a. Brahe	(Ulrichshoff)
Ursulin Forsthaus			11		Gorsin	
Wahlberg			11		Hammer	Prot=Wtelno
Weichselthal Haltestelle			3		Schulitz Oberförsterei	
Weißensee Forsthaus	Biala		9		Stronnau Oberförsterei	Prot=Krone; (Bialassee)
Wielonek			12		Cierplewo	
Wilden			58		Hopfengarten	
Wilhelminenhof			29		Sienno	
Wolfsgarten Forsthaus			11		Stronnau Oberförsterei	Prot=Krone
Wolken			77		Jägerhof	(Wolkem; Wulken)
Wymislowo			25		Netzort	

== Military command ==
Kreis Bromberg was part of:

- the 14th Infanterie regiment (3rd Pommersches) of the ??. Inf. Brigade. Created 1 July 1813. Honorary name of "Graf Schwerin".
- the 129th Infanterie regiment (??) of the 7. Inf. Brigade. Created 24 March 1881, in Graudenz.
- the 3rd Grenadier zu Pferde (cavlery) regiment (Neumärkisches) of the 4. Kav. Brigade. Created 29 December 1704. Honorary name of "Freiherr von Derfflinger".
- the 15th Fußartillerie regiment (2. Pommersches) of the ?. FußA. Brigade. Created 11 August 1893.
- the 17th Fußartillerie regiment (2. Pommersches) of the 2. FußA. Brigade. Created 24 October 1872.
- (also at Hohensalza) the 53rd Fußartillerie regiment (Hinterpommersches) of the ?. FußA. Brigade. Created 25 March 1899.

Corps	Garrison	Staats Name State Name	Type	Reich Name Empire Name	Honorary Name	Brigade (part of)	Created	Comments
II	Bromberg	3. Pommersches	Infanterie	14	Graf Schwerin		1 July 1813	
II	Bromberg		Infanterie	129		7. Inf.	24 March 1881	? started in Graudenz
II	Bromberg	Neumärkisches	Grenadier zu Pferde (type of cavalry)	3	Freiherr von Derfflinger	4. Kav.	29 December 1704	
II	Bromberg	2. Pommersches	Fußartillerie	15		? Fuß.	1 August 1893	
II	Bromberg	2. Pommersches	Feldartillerie	17		2. FeldA.	24 October 1872	Also Gnesen?
II	Bromberg; Hohensalza	Hinter- pommersches	Feldartillerie	53		? FeldA.	25 March 1899	

The data in the tables below was extracted from the 1905 Prussian gazetteer Gemeindelexikon für das Königreich Preußen.

== Court system ==
The main court (German: Landgericht) was in Bromberg, with smaller courts (German: Amtsgericht) in Bromberg and Krone.

== Standesämter ==
"Standesamt" is the German name of the local civil registration offices which were established in October 1874 soon after the German Empire was formed. Births, marriages and deaths were recorded. Previously, only the church records were used for Christians. In 1905, these Standesämter served towns in Kreis Bromberg:

Althof	Fordon	Klein Bartelsee	Potulice	Thalheim
Bromberg (L1)	Fuchsschwanz	Krone	Prinzenthal	Wilhelmsort
Bromberg (L2)	Groß Neudorf	Monkowarsk	Schanzendorf	Wtelno
Bromberg (L3)	Hohenfelde	Ossowitz	Schleusenau	
Dobsch	Kirschgrund	Pawlowke	Schulitz	

== Police districts ==
In 1905, these police districts (German: Polizeidistrikt) served towns in Kreis Bromberg:

Althof	Bromberg II (Okollo)	Fordon	Königlich Wierzchucin	Wilhelmsort
Bromberg I	Bromberg III (Fordon)	Krone	Schulitz	Zolondowo

== Catholic churches ==
In 1905, these Catholic parish churches served towns in Kreis Bromberg:

Bromberg	Groß Lonsk	Liebensee	Nakel	Rasmushausen	Wtelno
Byschewo	Groß Wudschin	Lischkowo	Neuheim	Schirotzken	Zolondowo
Dobsch	Krone	Monkowarsk	Osielsk	Schulitz	
Fordon	Königlich Wierzchucin	Mrotschen	Penchowo	Slesin	

== Protestant churches ==
In 1905, these Protestant parish churches served towns in Kreis Bromberg:

Bromberg	Groß Neudorf	Lochowo	Otteraue Langenau	Sienno Klarhrheim
Cielle	Hopfengarten	Monkowarsk	Prinzenthal	Wilhelmsort
Elsendorf	Klein Bartelsee	Mrotschen	Schleusenau	Wtelno
Fordon	Krone	Nakel	Schulitz	
Gogolin	Lindenwald	Osielsk	Schwedenhöhe	

== See also ==
- Bydgoszcz (general article about the modern city)
