= Saint-Joseph, Quebec =

The following places in Quebec, Canada are named Saint-

- Saint-Joseph Lake (La Jacques-Cartier), a freshwater body in Capitale-Nationale
- Lac-Saint-Joseph, Quebec
- Saint-Joseph-de-Beauce, Quebec
- Saint-Joseph-de-Coleraine, Quebec
- Saint-Joseph-de-Kamouraska, Quebec
- Saint-Joseph-de-Lepage, Quebec
- Saint-Joseph-des-Érables, Quebec
- Saint-Joseph-de-Sorel, Quebec
- Saint-Joseph-du-Lac, Quebec
- Ham-Sud, Quebec, formerly known as Saint-Joseph-de-Ham-Sud

== See also ==
- Saint Joseph (disambiguation)
- Saint Joseph's (disambiguation)
