= St. Joe =

St. Joe or Saint Joe may refer to:

== Communities ==
In the United States:

- St. Joe, Arkansas
- Port St. Joe, Florida
- Saint Joe, Idaho
- St. Joe, Illinois
- Saint Joe, Indiana
- St. Joseph, Michigan, colloquially known as St. Joe
- St. Joe, Missouri
- Saint Joe, West Virginia
- St. Joe, Wisconsin
- St. Joe, Oregon

== Parks and geographic features ==
- St. Joe River, in northern Idaho
- St. Joe National Forest, in the Idaho panhandle
- St. Joe State Park, in Missouri

== Other ==
- St. Joe Company, a land developer

== See also ==
- Saint Joseph (disambiguation)
- Saint Joseph's (disambiguation)
