= National Shrine of Saint Joseph =

National Shrine of Saint Joseph may refer to:

- Santuário Nacional de São José de Anchieta (Santuário Nacional do São José de Anchieta), Anchieta, Espírito Santo, Brazil
- Saint Joseph's Oratory (Oratoire Saint-Joseph du Mont-Royal), Montréal, Québec, Canada
- National Shrine of Saint Joseph (Karlovac) (Nacionalno Svetište sv. Josipa), Karlovac, Croatia
- National Shrine of Saint Joseph (Mandaue), Cebu, Philippines
- National Shrine of Saint Joseph (De Pere, Wisconsin), USA
- Cathedral of San José de Mayo, Uruguay

== See also ==
- National shrine
- Saint Joseph (disambiguation)
- Saint Joseph's (disambiguation)
- St. Joseph Church (disambiguation)
- St. Joseph's Cathedral (disambiguation)
- Cathedral Basilica of St. Joseph (disambiguation)
