= Church of St. Joseph, Craftsman, Bydgoszcz =

20th-century Catholic church in Bydgoszcz, Poland

Coordinates: 53°06′57″N 18°02′19″E

Church of Saint Joseph, Craftsman
- Polish: Kościół św. Józefa Rzemieślnika w Bydgoszczy
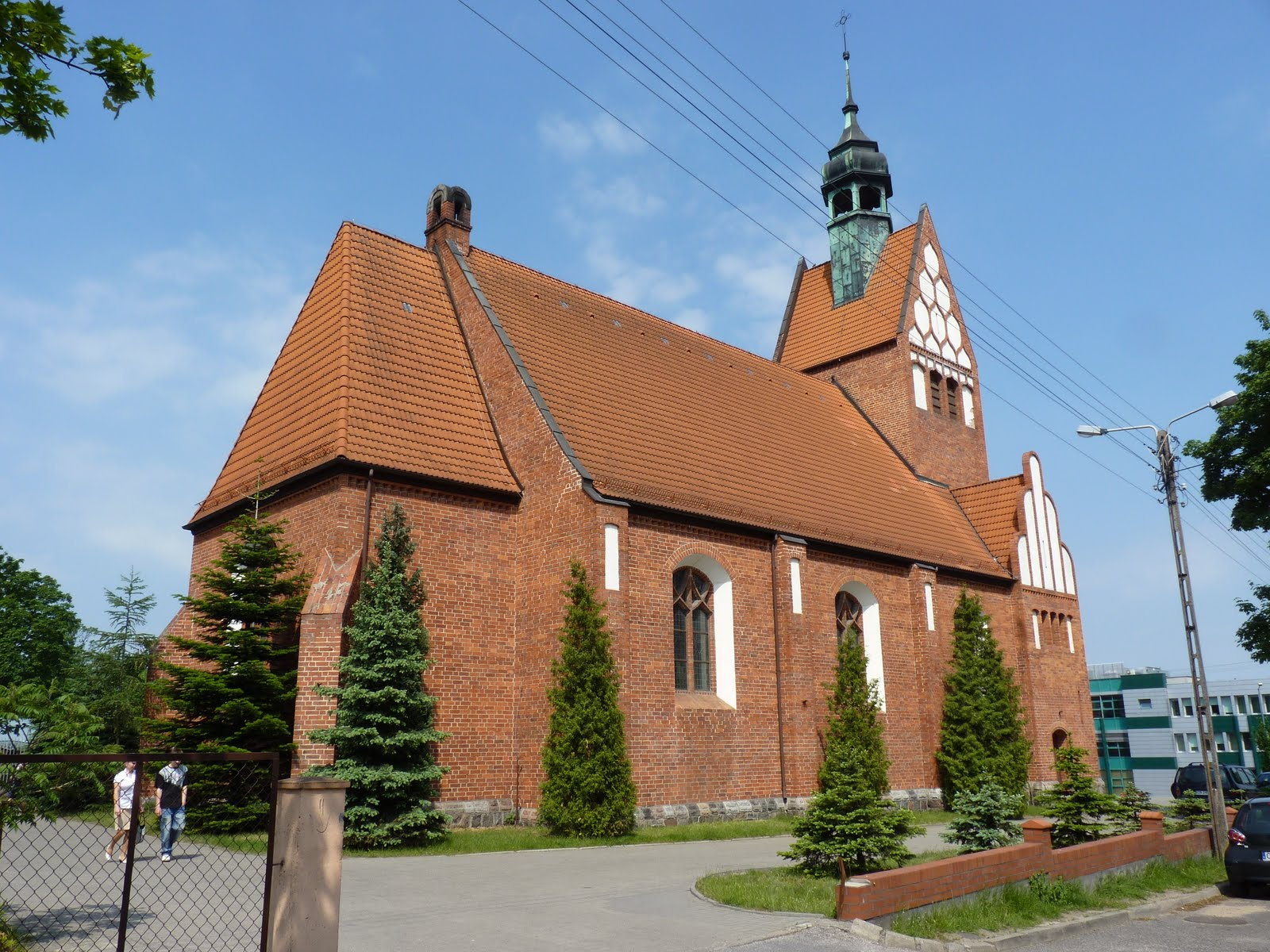
- Church of Saint Joseph, Craftsman, Bydgoszcz
- Church of Saint Joseph, Craftsman
- Location: 166 Toruńska Street, Bydgoszcz
- Country: Poland
- Denomination: Catholic Church
- Website: https://swjozef.bydgoszcz.pl/

History
- Status: Church
- Dedication: Saint Joseph
- Dedicated: 1906

Architecture
- Functional status: Active
- Heritage designation: Nr.A/852 from 30 January 1996 (church) and A/1088 on 24 November 1993 (cemetery)
- Architect: Ismaar Hermann
- Architectural type: Eclecticism, Neo-Gothic architecture and Neo-Romanesque architecture
- Completed: 1906

The Church of St. Joseph, Craftsman is a Catholic church in Bydgoszcz, Poland; it is located at 166 Toruńska Street on the northern border of the Wyżyny district. Built as an Evangelical-Union Church for the use of the German community until 1945, it is now a Catholic church devoted to Saint Joseph the Craftsman. Its parish cemetery covers an area west of the church, delineated by the Toruńska, Władysława Bełzy and Cienista streets. The religious ensemble (church and cemetery) is registered on the Kuyavian-Pomeranian Voivodeship heritage list.

== History ==
=== Prussian period ===
At the end of the 19th century and the beginning of the 20th century, Bydgoszcz (then named Bromberg) and its vicinity witnessed an important growth of Evangelical sacral architecture. At that time, eight reformed congregations had their temple constructed, mostly following Neo-Gothic style, using red bricks for the facades.

On 24 September 1903, the Prussian authorities issued several permits for the construction of community churches in the surrounding villages, in Klein Bartelsee (today's Małe Bartodzieje), Printzenthal (Wilczak district), Schleusenau (Okole district), Szuszkówka (Czyżkówko district) and Schwedenhöhe (Szwederowo district).

The Evangelical-Union community of the suburban village of Klein Bartelsee was established in 1898. It consisted almost exclusively of German believers. Its pastor was Wilhelm Faure, who served until 1930.

Ismar Hermann, a royal district construction inspector realized the design of Klein Bartelsee's edifice in 1904: Oskar Hoßfeld, the Ministry of Public Works in Berlin, approved the plans. The latter was the architect supervisor for all works related to sacral construction in territories under Prussian rule. Oskar Hoßfeld designed himself the Church of the Sacred Heart of the Lord Jesus in Bydgoszcz. Works by Georg Weiss company were completed in 1906. Funds for the construction were gathered from the Gustav-Adolf-Werk foundation and from an annual pension from the city of Bromberg/Bydgoszcz, guaranteed for a period of 50 years. The temple was dedicated to Saint Joseph on 15 October 1906.

During the same period, Ismar Hermann (and Oskar Hoßfeld) designed (and approved) the following projects:

- the Martin Luther evangelical church for the parish of Szwederowo (destroyed after the end of WWII);
- the evangelical church for the parish of Wilczak (today the Catholic Church of the Divine Mercy).

=== From 1920 to WWII ===
The temple served the Evangelical German community of Bydgoszcz until 1945. Be that as it may, the years of expansion of the parish and its congregation passed their heyday after World War I. As a matter of fact, if Protestant church-goers constituted less than 10% of the total population of the city in 1939, they still had more temples than Catholics. in 1927, the Evangelical parish of Małe Bartodzieje numbered only 570 believers.

At the end of the Second World War, most of the Germans left Bydgoszcz and Evangelical parish temples ceased to be used. The municipal authorities then progressively transferred the responsibility of the edifices to Polish Catholic communities. As such, the Małe Bartodzieje church was renamed after Saint Joseph-the-Craftsman (Kościół św. Józefa Rzemieślnika). It initially served as a rector's church and a filial church of the Bydgoszcz Cathedral.

=== Post WWII period ===
On 1 October 1946, the church was established as a parish church.

In the 1960s and 1970s, the church provided pastoral care out of necessity for residents of the new large housing estates under construction in Bydgoszcz: Wyżyny and Kapuściska districts. In 1993 the historic stained glass window in the presbytery was renovated.

In 1996, the church was listed on the heritage list of Kuyavian-Pomeranian Voivodeship.

On October 15, 2006, Bishop Jan Tyrawa performed the consecration of the church, celebrating the 100th anniversary of the edifice.

In 2019, the city authorities allocated funds for the renovation of the facade, which was completed in 2020. Additional restoration was carried out in the years 2022-2024, on the following elements:

- wooden structure of the barrel ceiling and timber roof truss;
- ornamental decorations on the barrel ceiling;
- vault polychromes of the main nave.

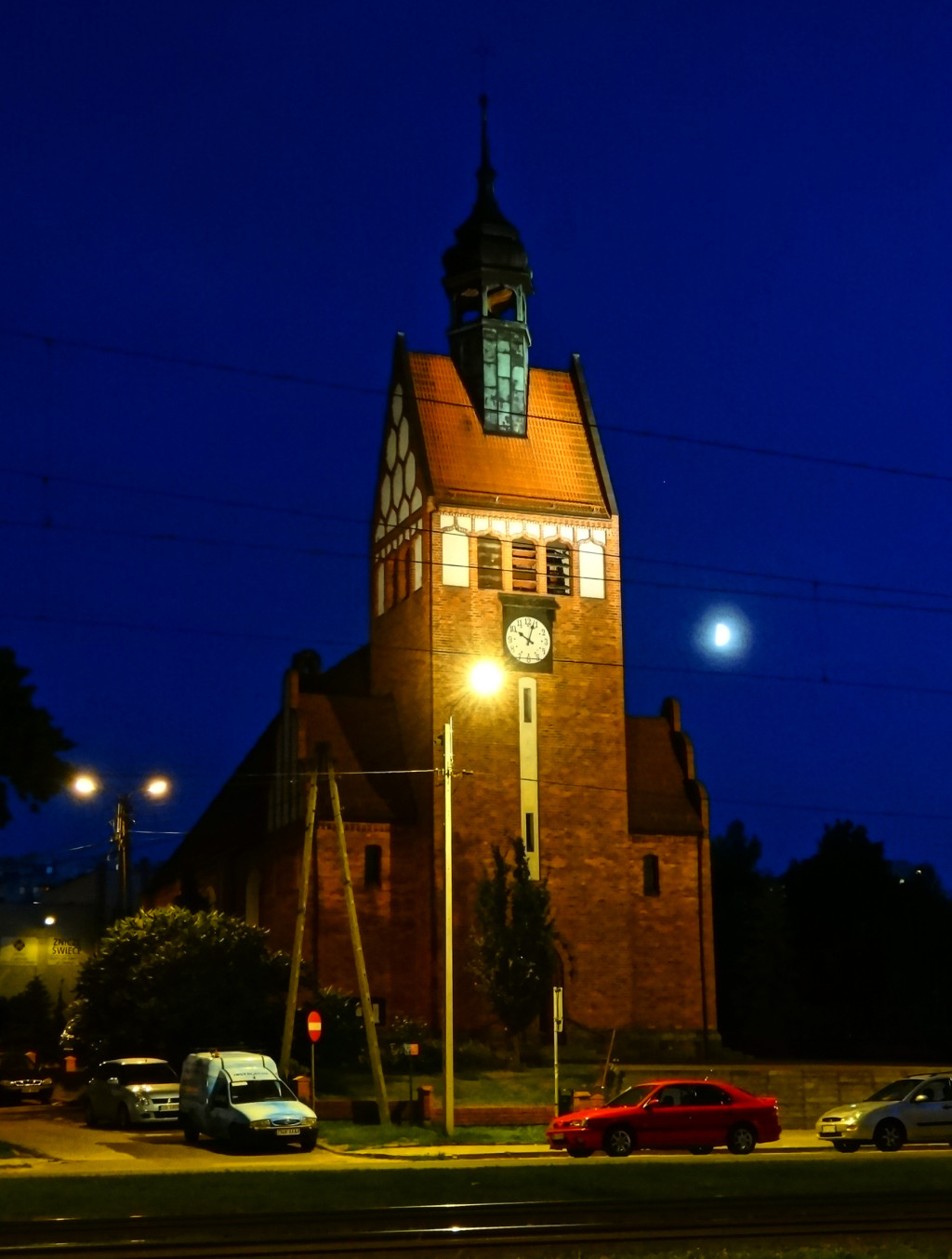
By night

== Architecture ==
=== Outdoor features ===
The church displays eclectic style, with Neo-Gothic and Neo-Romanesque features. The frontage is dominated by a massive bell tower topped with a baroque ridge turret. The church has a single nave, with a straight chancel facing south. In the south-west corner is located the sacristy.

The triangular gable annexes and the tower are decorated with plastered panels. The Neo-Gothic style of the building is mainly highlighted by the outside buttress blocks, the interior rib vault, the windows with tracery and a gable topping the main portal.

Compared to the neighboring Evangelical churches of its time (e.g. in Wilczak and Szwederowo), the edifice exhibits slightly more modest architectural forms, signifying humility of the parish's faithful.

=== Interior design ===
Like the outside, the interiors combine three styles: neo-Romanesque, neo-Baroque and the dominant neo-Gothic.

Inside the church, a wooden upper gallery has been preserved. In the chancel, ribbed vault technic was used, while in the nave wooden barrel vault is displayed. The original colours can be seen just above the choir, where lower layers of paint were uncovered for the needs of future renovation work.

The pipe organ has been built in 1906, by Paul Voelkner from Bydgoszcz, when the temple housed the Evangelical-Unionist community. In the 1980s, they have been rebuilt by Kazimierz Urbański.

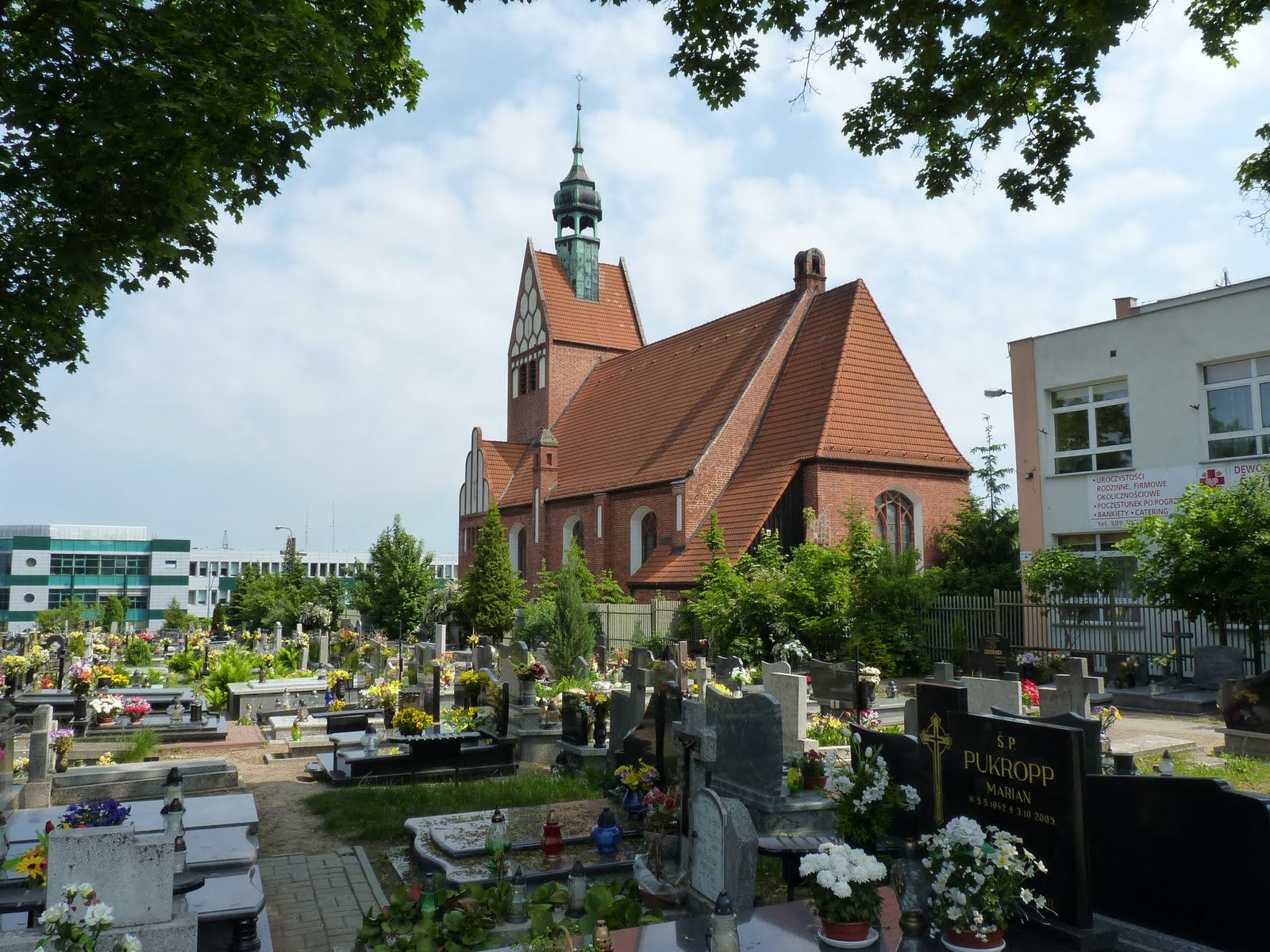
View of the church from the cemetery

== Parish cemetery ==
The cemetery was established in 1822 for the needs of the Evangelical parish in Małe Bartodzieje. Deceased from both faiths - Evangelical and Catholic- were buried here. The church was built more than 80 years later.

When the Catholic parish of St. Joseph the Craftsman was established, the local cemetery was transferred to the management of the city.

Since the late 1940s, the site has been housing a section for Polish soldiers and residents of Bydgoszcz who died during World War II: it contains the mass graves of 69 deceased. It is closed to burials since 1965, when it has been declared a municipal cemetery: new burials are only possible on the site of decommissioned previous graves.

In 1993, the cemetery was listed on the heritage list of Kuyavian-Pomeranian Voivodeship.

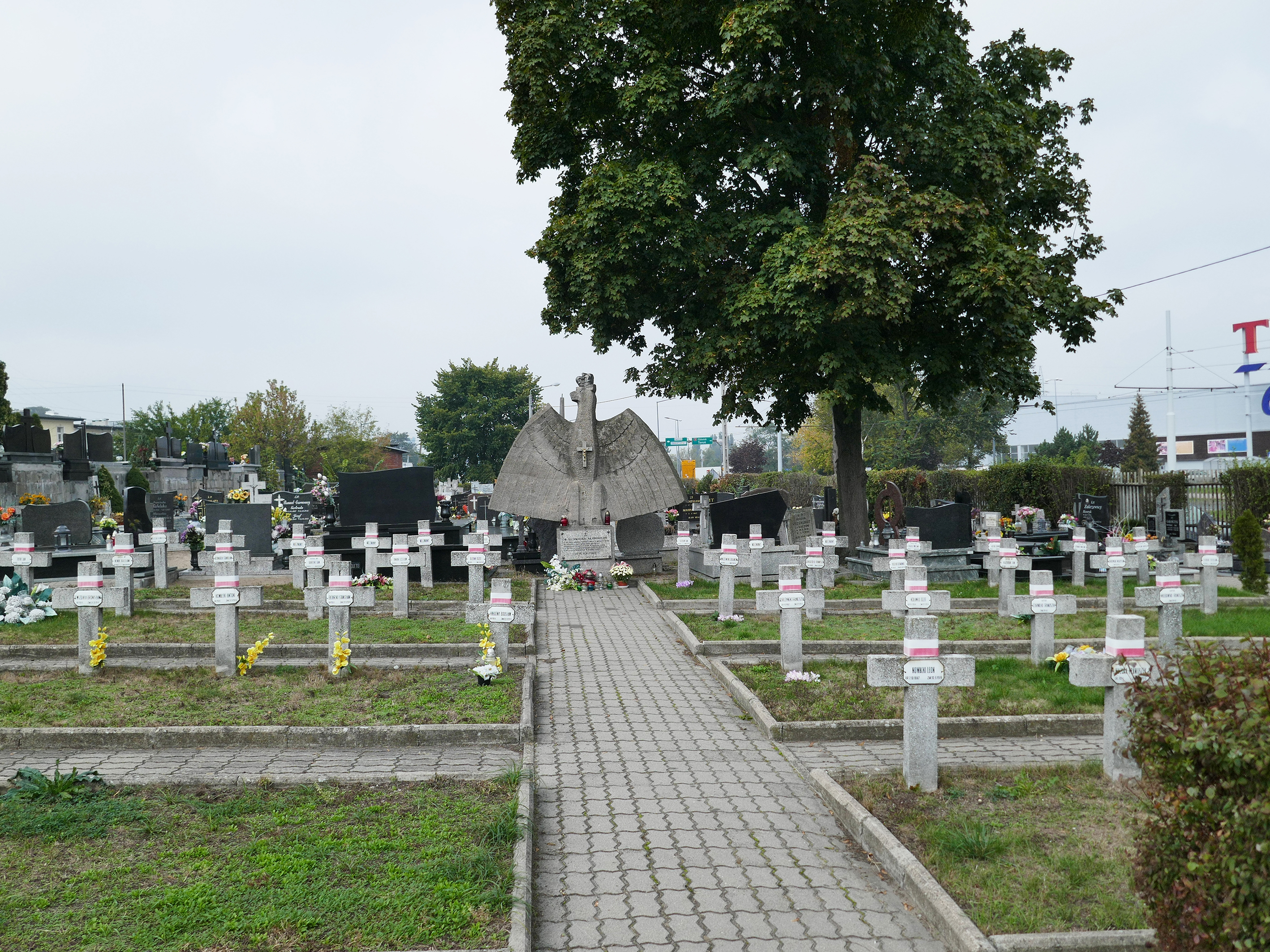
WWII quarter

=== Characteristics ===
The cemetery measures 150 metres (490 ft) by 90 metres (300 ft) and covers an area of about 1.3 hectares (140,000 sq ft). It is assessed that around 3,000 people are buried there.

The site includes, among others, a morgue and a chapel from the first half of the 20th century, approximately 50 tombstones and graves from the first half of the 20th century and a figure of Christ from the first half of the 20th century. The oldest tombstone dates back to 1895.

A WWII Polish Army Soldiers' Quarters is located on the right side of the entrance gate from Toruńska Street. The plot's frontage displays a concrete monumental stylized eagle standing on a pedestal, realized by Jerzy Buczkowski from Solec Kujawski and unveiled on 3 September 1982. A plaque on the plinth details the following tombs:

- 2 soldiers of the Polish Armed Forces from the Second Polish Republic, who died on 3 September 1939;
- 18 unidentified denizens of Bydgoszcz, shot by the Germans in September 1939;
- 49 soldiers of the Polish People's Army, who died during the fights for the liberation of the city in January 1945.

== Gallery ==
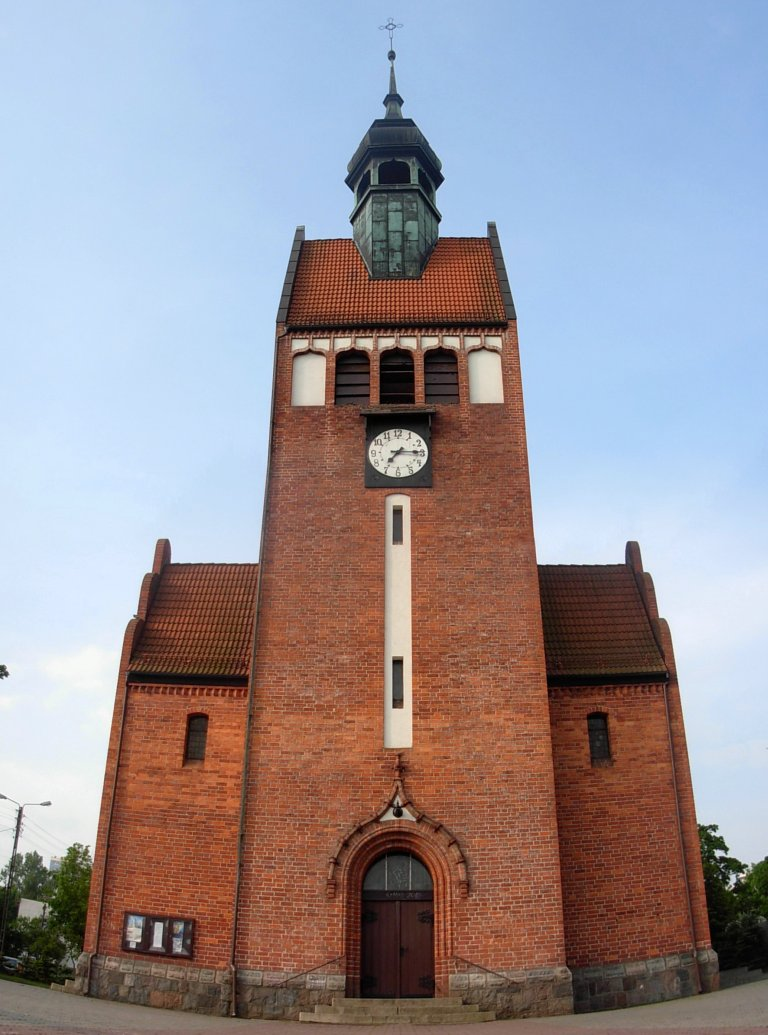
Church - Main facade

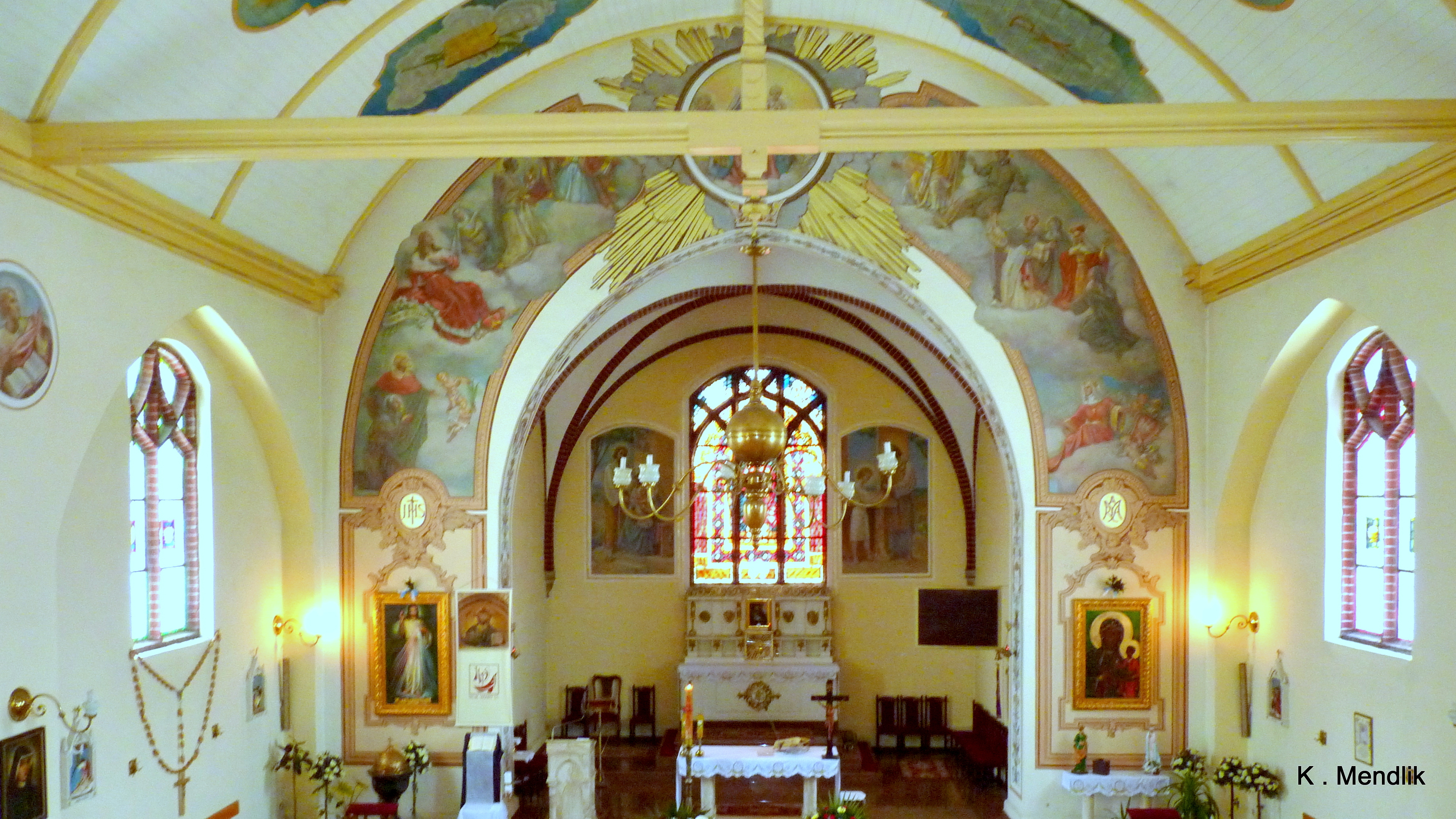
View of the chancel

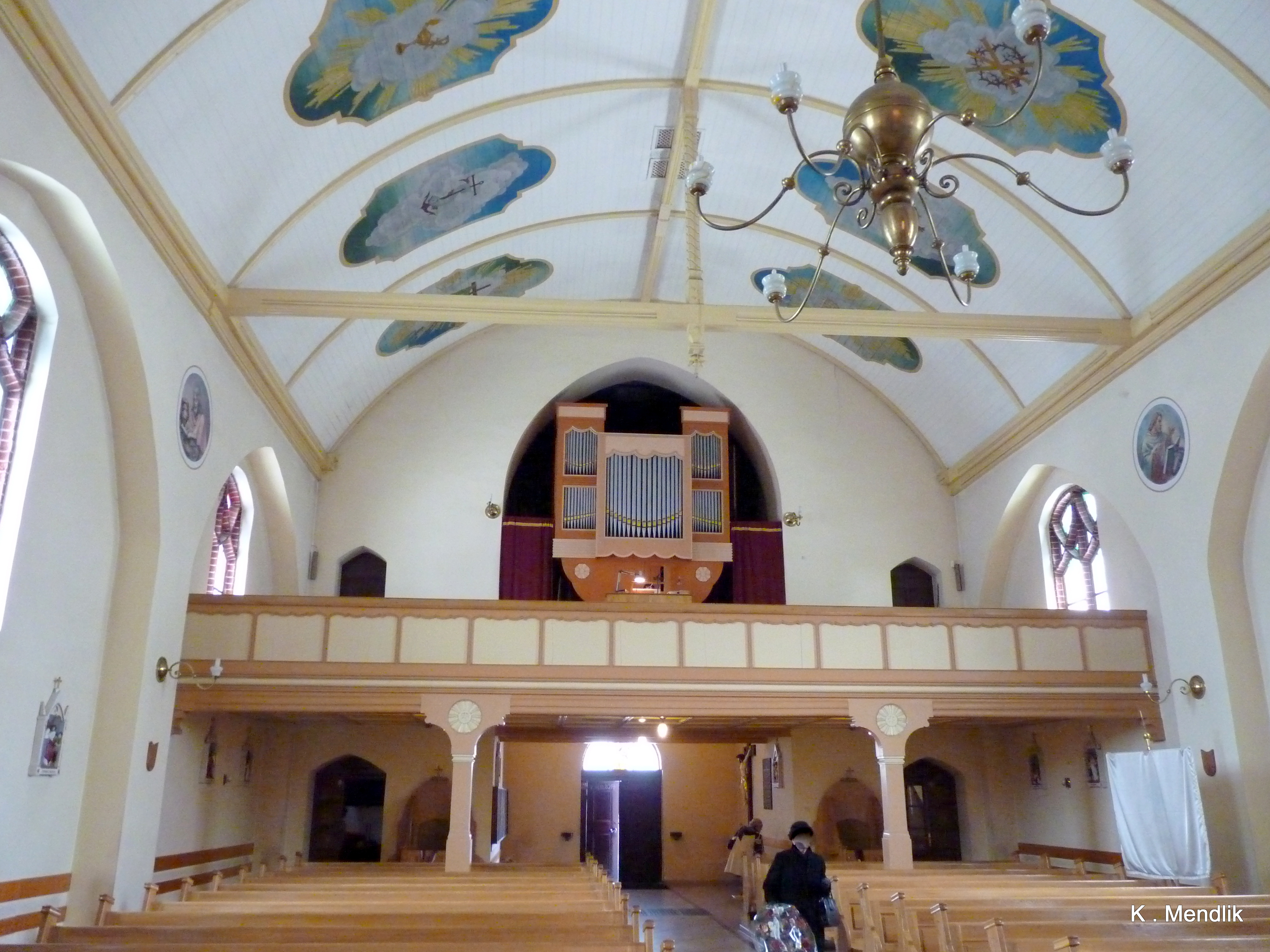
Pipe organ

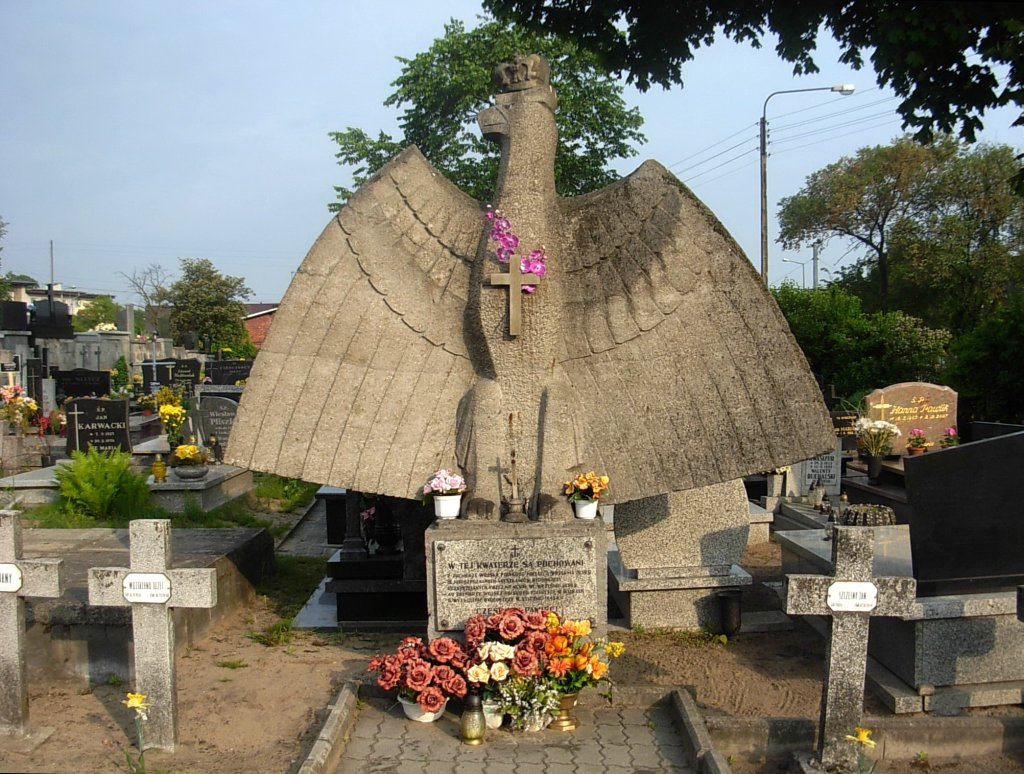
Cemetery - Monumental Eagle

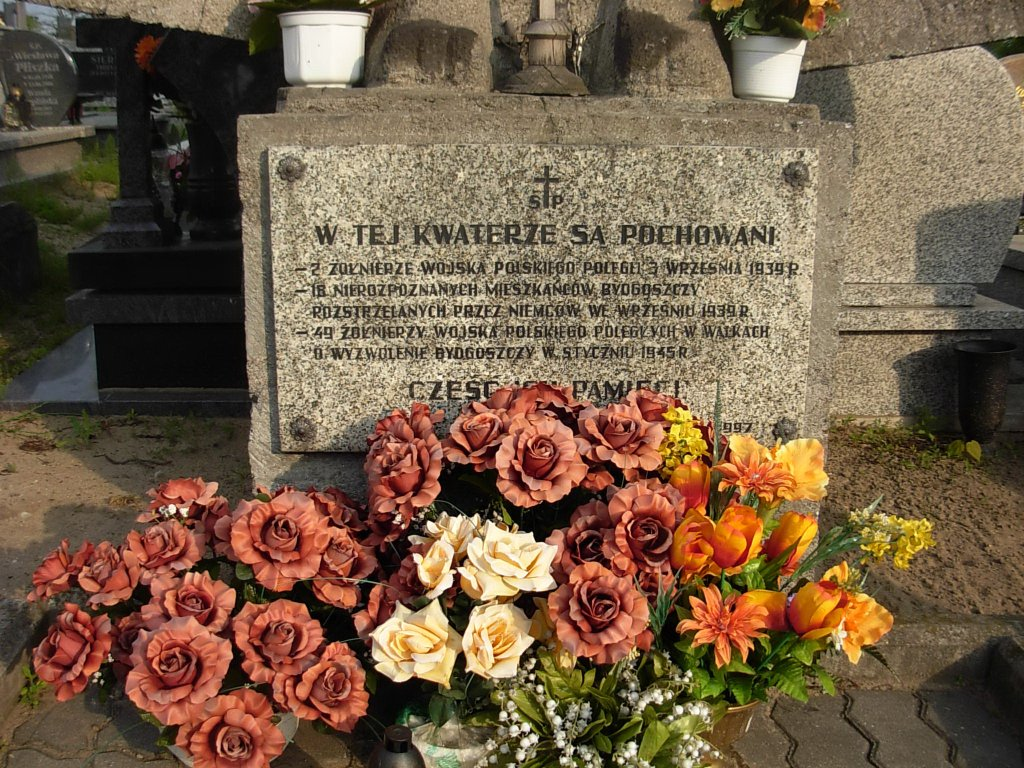
Cemetery - Plaque at the WWII Polish Army Soldiers' Quarters

== See also ==
- Bydgoszcz
- Church of the Sacred Heart of the Lord Jesus in Bydgoszcz
- Bydgoszcz Cathedral
- Oskar Hoßfeld
