= Bartodzieje Małe =

Coordinates: 53.1145°N 18.0391°E

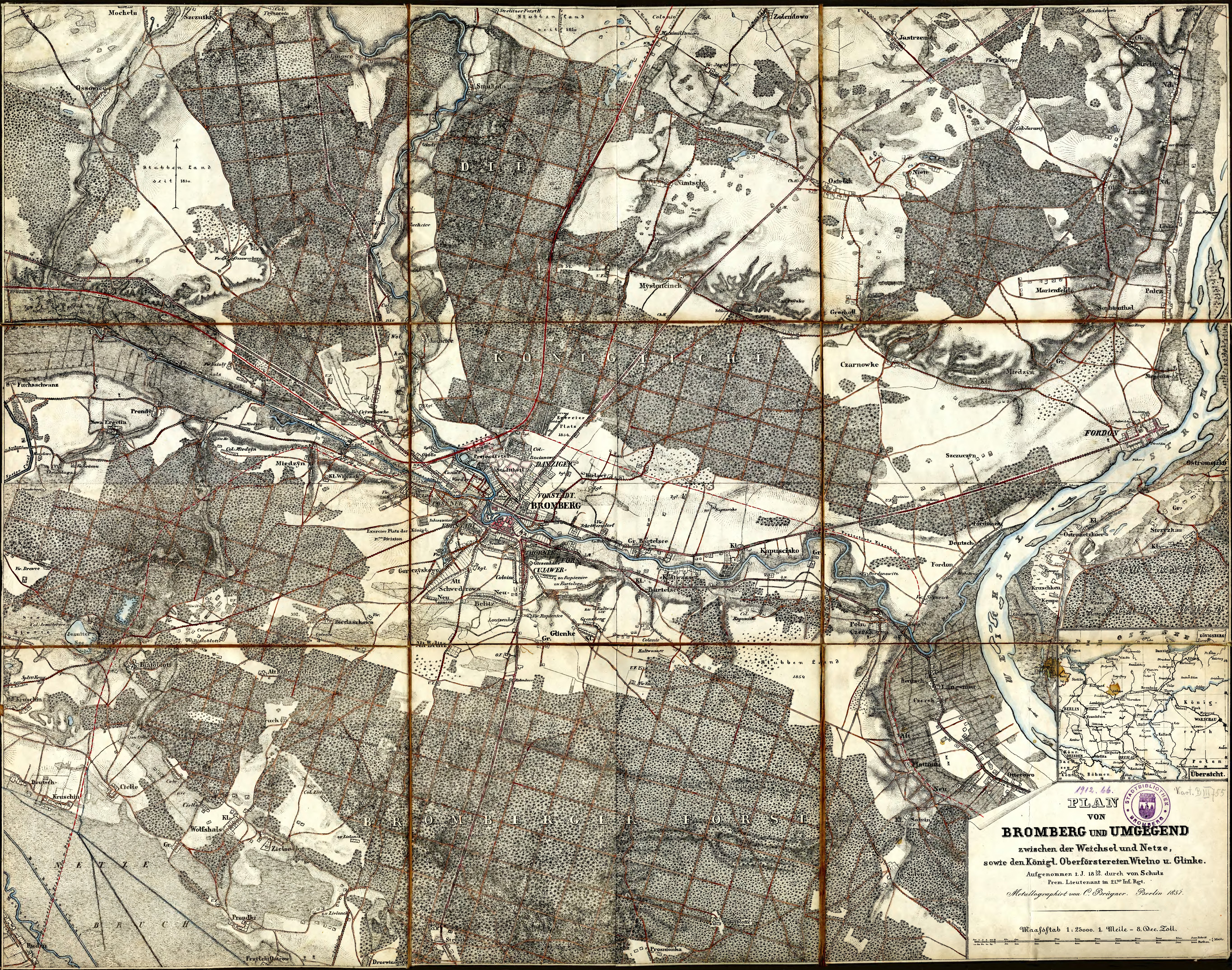
Map of Bromberg/Bydgoszcz area 1857

Bartodzieje Małe (German: Klein Bartelsee, occasionally Klein Bartelsen) - was a large village located on the south bank of the River Brda in what is now Bydgoszcz County, Poland.

== History ==
During the nineteenth century, it was a village located on the eastern outskirts of the City of Bromberg (now Bydgoszcz), in Landkreis Bromberg, Province of Posen, in the Kingdom of Prussia. At the beginning of the twentieth century, it had a population of 1,900 people. It lay across the River Brda from the village of Bartodzieje wielkie (German: Groß Bartelsee). Both villages were incorporated into the City of Bydgoszcz on 1 April 1920.
