= St. Joseph Township =

St. Joseph Township may refer to:

In Canada:

- St. Joseph Township, Ontario

In the United States:

- St. Joseph Township, Champaign County, Illinois
- St. Joseph Township, Allen County, Indiana
- St. Joseph Township, Berrien County, Michigan (Saint Joseph Charter Township)
- St. Joseph Township, Stearns County, Minnesota
- St. Joseph Township, Kittson County, Minnesota
- St. Joseph Township, Pembina County, North Dakota
- St. Joseph Township, Williams County, Ohio
