= St. Joseph Township, Stearns County, Minnesota =

St. Joseph Township, Minnesota
- Township
- Location within the state of Minnesota St. Joseph Township, Minnesota (the United States)
- Coordinates: 45°32′N 94°18′W
- Country: United States
- State: Minnesota
- County: Stearns

Area
  - Total: 30.6 sq mi (79.2 km^{2})
  - Land: 30.1 sq mi (77.9 km^{2})
  - Water: 0.50 sq mi (1.3 km^{2})
- Elevation: 1,138 ft (347 m)

Population (2010)
  - Total: 1,924
  - Density: 64.0/sq mi (24.7/km^{2})
- Time zone: UTC-6 (Central (CST))
  - Summer (DST): UTC-5 (CDT)
- FIPS code: 27-57148
- GNIS feature ID: 0665518
- Website: https://stjosephtownship.org/

St. Joseph Township is a township in Stearns County, Minnesota, United States. The population was 1,924 at the 2010 census. The township borders the western side of the cities of St. Cloud and Waite Park, and completely surrounds the city of St. Joseph. All are components of the St. Cloud Metropolitan Statistical Area.

== History ==
St. Joseph Township was organized in 1858, and named after a local church.

== Geography ==
According to the United States Census Bureau, the township has a total area of 30.6 square miles (79.2 km^{2}); 30.1 square miles (77.9 km^{2}) is land and 0.50 square miles (1.3 km^{2}), or 1.60%, is water.

St. Joseph Township is located in Township 124 North of the Arkansas Base Line and Range 29 West of the 5th Principal Meridian.

== Demographics ==
As of the census of 2000, there were 2,449 people, 845 households, and 637 families residing in the township. The population density was 73.6 inhabitants per square mile (28.4/km^{2}). There were 876 housing units at an average density of 26.3 per square mile (10.2/km^{2}). The racial makeup of the township was 94.12% White, 0.49% African American, 0.16% Native American, 3.55% Asian, 0.37% from other races, and 1.31% from two or more races. Hispanic or Latino of any race were 3.35% of the population.

There were 845 households, out of which 40.8% had children under the age of 18 living with them, 62.2% were married couples living together, 7.2% had a female householder with no husband present, and 24.6% were non-families. 17.2% of all households were made up of individuals, and 3.9% had someone living alone who was 65 years of age or older. The average household size was 2.90 and the average family size was 3.30.

In the township the population was spread out, with 30.5% under the age of 18, 9.4% from 18 to 24, 30.9% from 25 to 44, 22.2% from 45 to 64, and 7.0% who were 65 years of age or older. The median age was 33 years. For every 100 females, there were 109.1 males. For every 100 females age 18 and over, there were 111.6 males.

The median income for a household in the township was $45,396, and the median income for a family was $51,321. Males had a median income of $32,039 versus $22,288 for females. The per capita income for the township was $18,384. About 3.7% of families and 6.3% of the population were below the poverty line, including 5.8% of those under age 18 and 5.6% of those age 65 or over.
