= Saint Joseph, Mercer County, Ohio =

Unincorporated community in Ohio, U.S.

Coordinates: 40°25′41″N 84°44′20″W

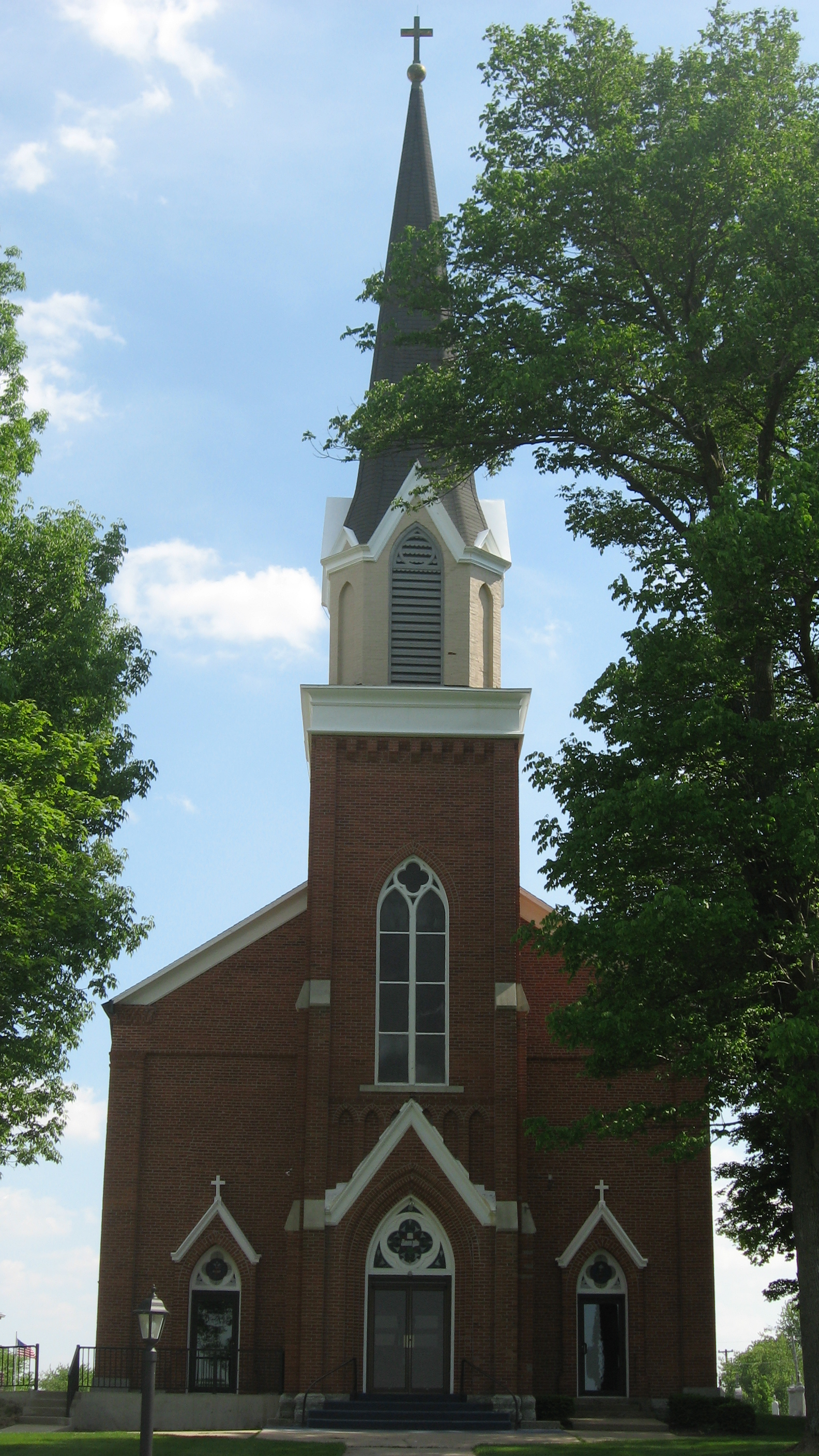
St. Joseph Catholic Church (Saint Joseph, Ohio)

Saint Joseph is an unincorporated community in Mercer County, in the U.S. state of Ohio.

== History ==
Saint Joseph was laid out in 1861, and named after the local St. Joseph's Catholic Church.
