= Old School Tie =

An old school tie is a tie that former pupils are entitled to wear upon leaving school.

Old school tie may also refer to:

- The "old school tie", a metaphor for old boy networks
- "The Old School Tie", a 1980 episode of Minder
- "Old School Ties" (The Good Guys), a 1993 television episode
- "Old School Ties" (Lewis), a 2007 television episode
