= School tie =

Necktie signifying attendance at a particular school

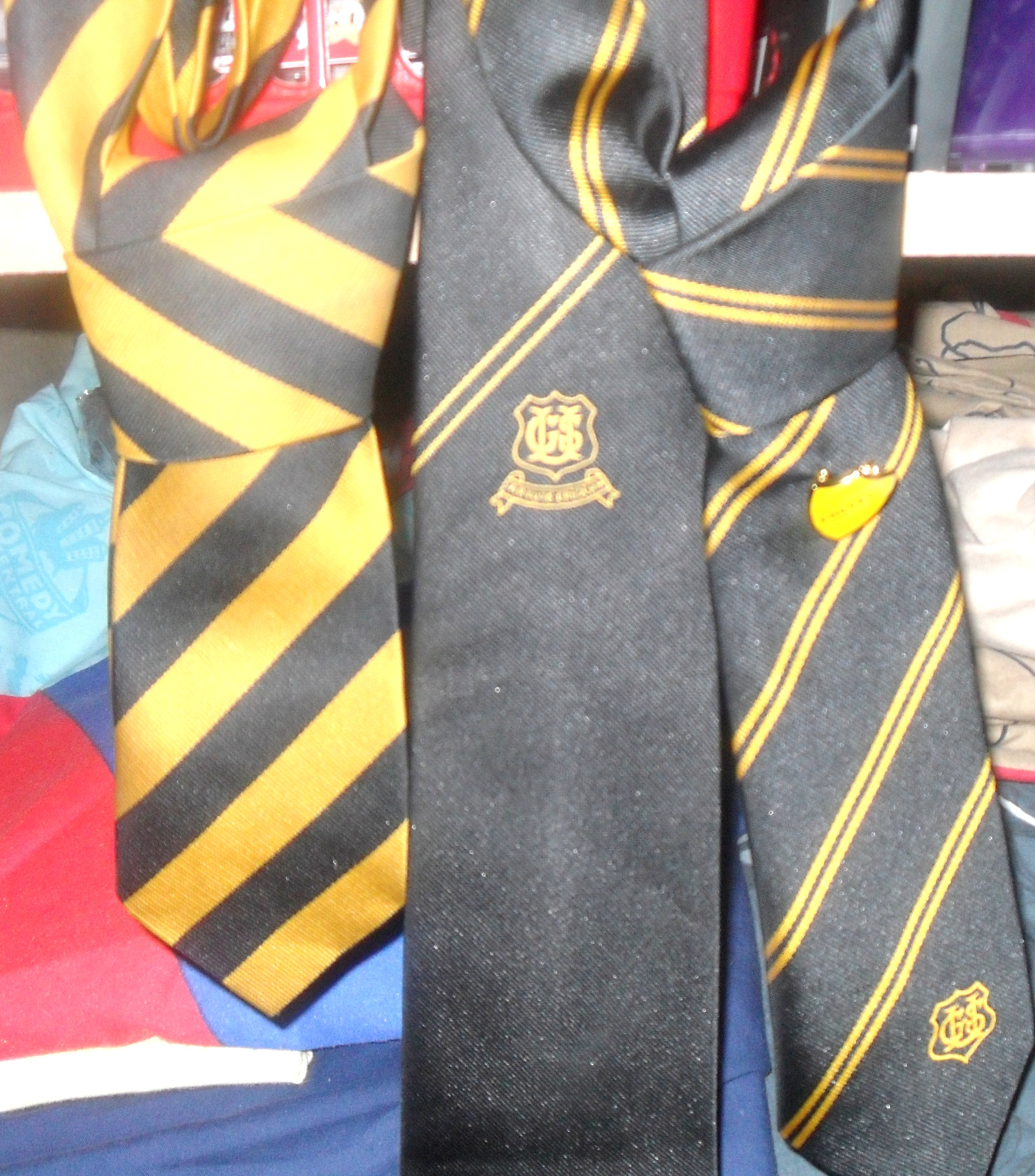
School ties of Uddingston Grammar School, Scotland

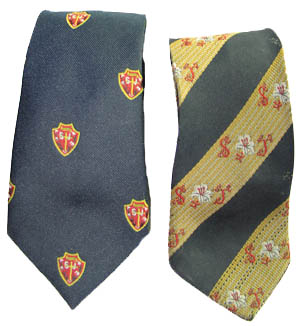
Ties of St. Joseph's Anglo-Chinese School in Hong Kong

The school tie is part of the school uniform required by a large number of English schools. The old school tie refers to a tie voluntarily worn by alumni of long established British schools. Figuratively, it is used to refer to the connection between members of the elite who attended the institutions: this is particularly associated with public schools.

== School tie ==
A school tie indicates pupils of a particular school, or year group, or of a particular house in that school. In addition, for some schools, the school tie is not merely an indication that the student belongs to a group or community but the tie is a part of the concept called "smart": which associates tidy school uniforms with high standards.

The school tie can be a way for people to distinguish between groups and social classes in the way students are labelled according to the colour of their ties and their uniforms.

== Old school tie ==
An old school tie or old boys tie is a tie that, on leaving school, former pupils are entitled to wear. They will be in their old school or old-boy society colours. According to protocol, it may only be worn by former pupils. This symbol can be a discreet passport to the old boy network, and such ties can be an indication of one's social standing. Conversely, wearing a tie to which you have no right is a serious social gaffe.

Although originally an institution of English public schools, some schools of mixed or female-only membership do present their female leavers with a tie or other equivalent. Alternative clothing such as socks, scarfs, pyjamas and even underwear may also be available in the old-boy/old-girl colours.

These exclusive ties are not limited to British public schools: they are also a practice of some elite schools in Australia, many private, state-integrated, and some of the more prestigious state schools in New Zealand, Trinidad and Tobago many clubs, military regiments and colleges of universities such as Oxford and Cambridge, and have also spread to some of Britain's former imperial possessions, including Canada and the United States.

== As a metaphor ==
The "old school tie" is used by the British press and many native English speakers as a metaphor for old-boy social networks, nepotism, and the relatively disproportionate success of former pupils of major public schools, especially in politics and business. For example, after the 2010 General Election, The Times noted that 6% of the parliamentary Tory Party were Old Etonians, under the headline "Tories' old school tie still rules". Five years later, in 2015, the New Statesman observed, "The power of the old boys' network lives on: privately educated students earn more than those with identical qualifications educated by the state".

== See also ==
- Class ring - an approximate American equivalent
