= St. Joseph's Anglo-Chinese School =

Aided secondary school in Hong Kong

- 聖若瑟英文中學

Location
- 46 New Clear Water Bay Road, Kowloon; Hong Kong

Information
- Type: Aided Secondary Schools
- Motto: Ad Astra (Latin); To the stars
- Established: August 1958; 68 years ago
- Founder: Rev. Bro. Paul Sun
- School district: Kwun Tong
- President: Mr. Chu Fu Yau, Dominic
- Principal: Mr. Poon Wing Keung
- Teaching staff: 60
- Grades: Form One to Form Six
- Gender: Boys
- Enrollment: About 900
- Houses: Red、Yellow、Blue、Green
- Student Union/Association: Polaris
- Colours: Blue, white
- Athletics: Football, Badminton, Track
- Affiliations: Roman Catholic Diocese of Hong Kong
- Feeder Primary School: St. Joseph's Anglo-Chinese Primary School
- Website: https://www.sjacs.edu.hk/
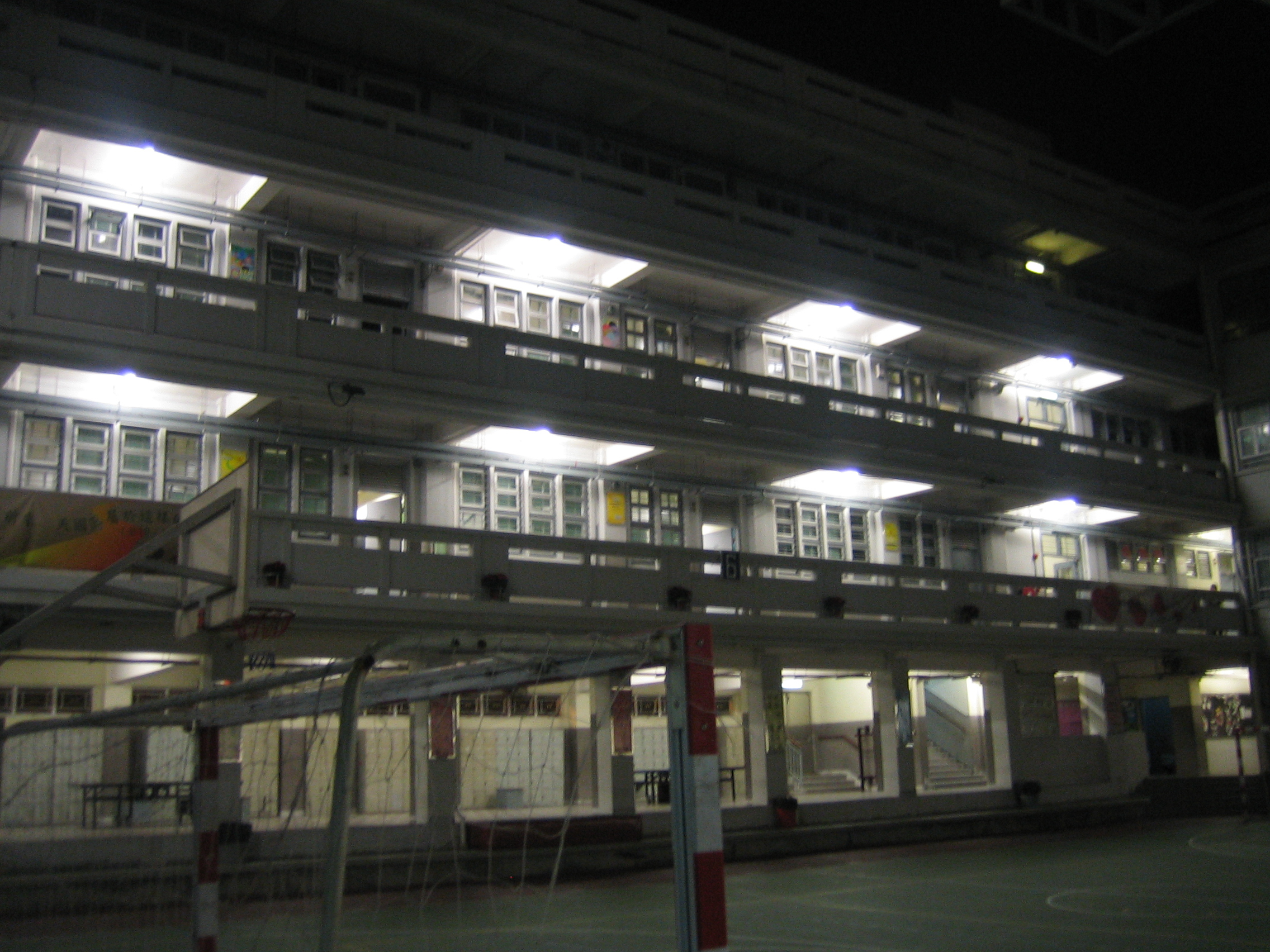
- Kwun Tong Road Ex-premise

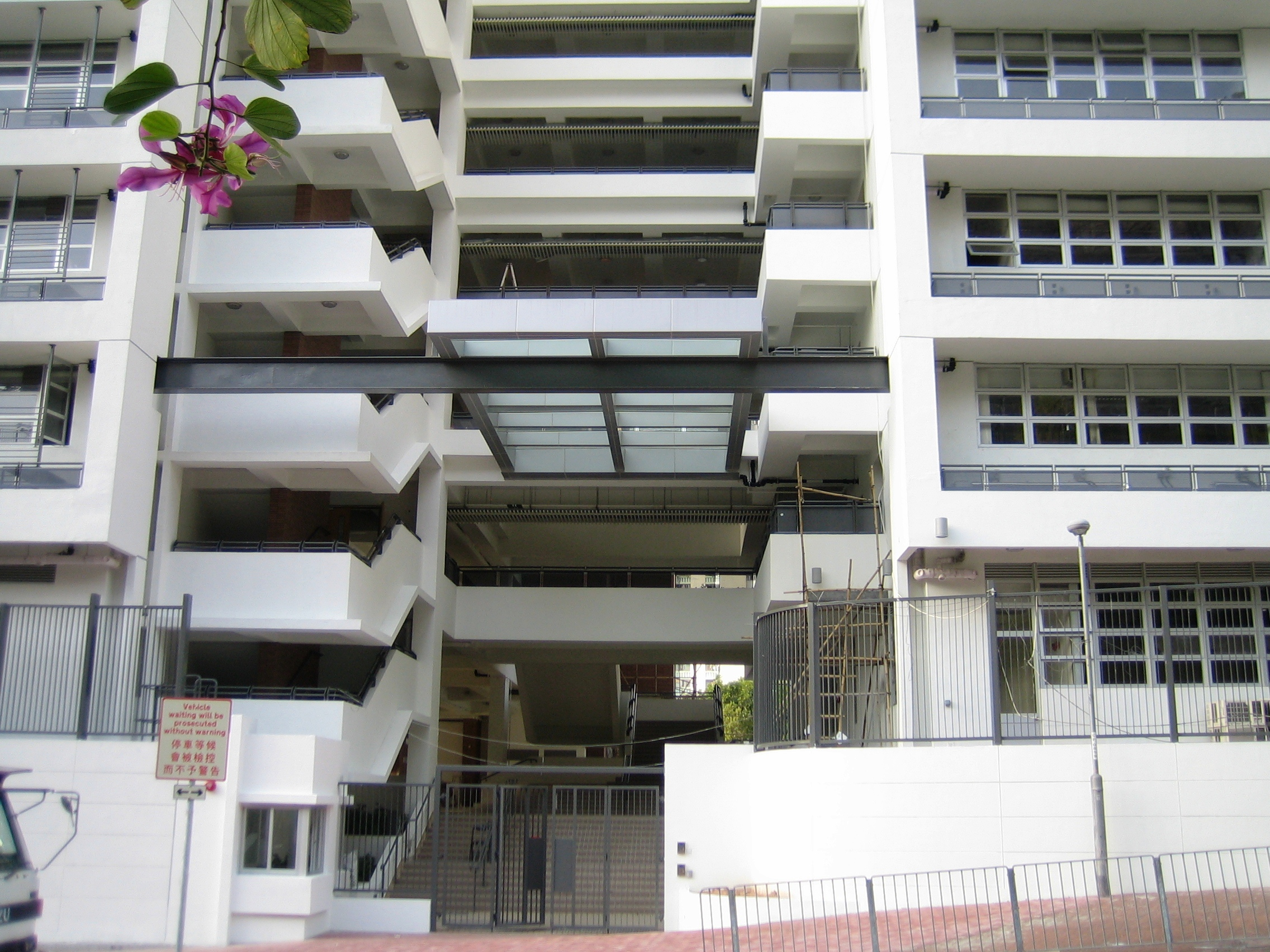
- Choi Hing Road New Campus

St. Joseph's Anglo-Chinese School
- Traditional Chinese: 聖若瑟英文中學
- Simplified Chinese: 圣若瑟英文中学
- Literal meaning: St. Joseph English Language Secondary School
Transcriptions
Standard Mandarin
- Hanyu Pinyin: Shèng Ruòsè Yīngwén Zhōngxué

St. Joseph's Anglo-Chinese School (Chinese: 聖若瑟英文中學; often abbreviated as SJACS) is an aided boys' secondary school in Kwun Tong District, Hong Kong. Founded in 1958 by Rev. Bro. Paul Sun, it was the first secondary school located in Kwun Tong. It is a Catholic school affiliated with the Diocese of Hong Kong. The patron saint of the school is Saint Joseph, and the school anniversary day is 19 March, the feast of St. Joseph.

== History ==
The school was founded by Rev. Bro. Paul Sun in 1958 in a villa on Kwun Tong Road, now the premise of St. Joseph's Anglo-Chinese Primary School (SJACPS). At first, the primary and secondary sections operated together. In 1967, the secondary section moved to 61 Kwun Tong Road, which is now the ex-premise. In 2008, the school celebrated its Golden Jubilee, and in January 2011 moved to Jordan Valley New Campus.

In the academic year of 2017–18, the school celebrated its 60th Anniversary (Diamond Jubilee), whose celebrations included several open days and carnivals, facility upgrades, the Diamond Jubilee Walkathon, Brother Paul Sun's Memorial Rites, and several others, all with the theme of "Homecoming" - featuring alumni as the star of the theme. Due to the packed frequency of events, the cancellation of the second term joint-test was required.

== School Song ==
SJACS School Song
School Song of SJACS

The school song has four stanzas. However, in all occasions, only the first two stanzas will be sung.

First stanza
Come you loyal son Josephian,
sing your Alma Mater's praise.
Let our youthful voices proudly sing
with the love of her kindly way.

Refrain
When the road of life is rough up hill
and the skies hang grey and grim;
then our steps will be light,
and our eyes shining bright
like true sons of S J A C S.

Second stanza
Though the days of boyhood speed away,
never to return again;
Though this day will be the morrow's past,
yet are we tomorrow's men.

Refrain

Third stanza
Dear St. Joseph be our lasting guide,
Be our strength through the years ahead.
On heart and mind, on home and friend,
your gracious influence shed.

Refrain

Fourth stanza
Come you loyal old Josephians,
sound your Alma Mater's praise.
With grateful voices now let's sing
the cherished joys of former days.
Refrain

== Campus ==
- Jordan Valley New Campus 22°19′56″N 114°13′1″E

The campus is located at 46 New Clear Water Bay Road, Jordan Valley, Kowloon, near Ngau Chi Wan, Choi Wan Estate, Ping Shek Estate, Shun Lee Estate.

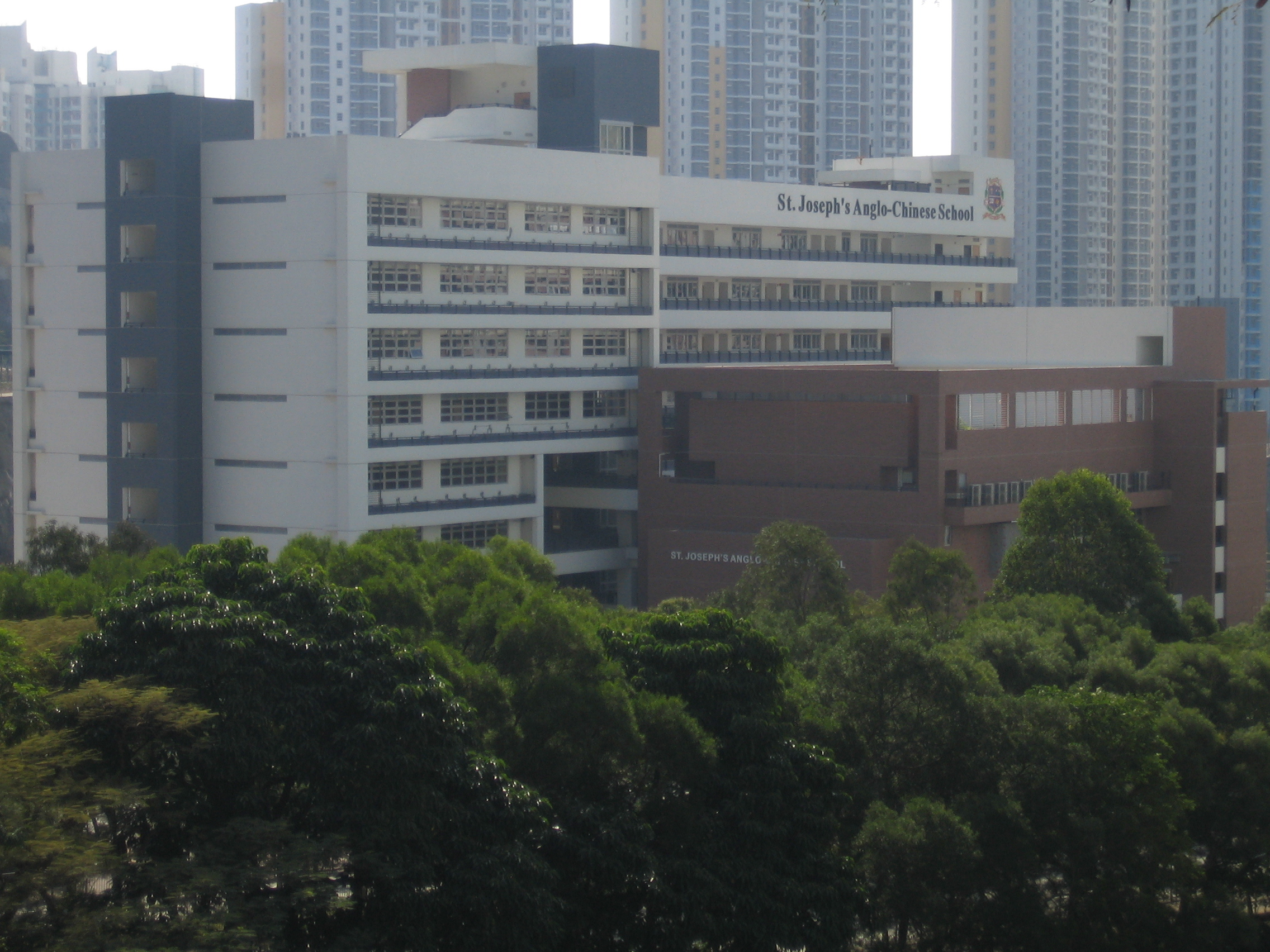

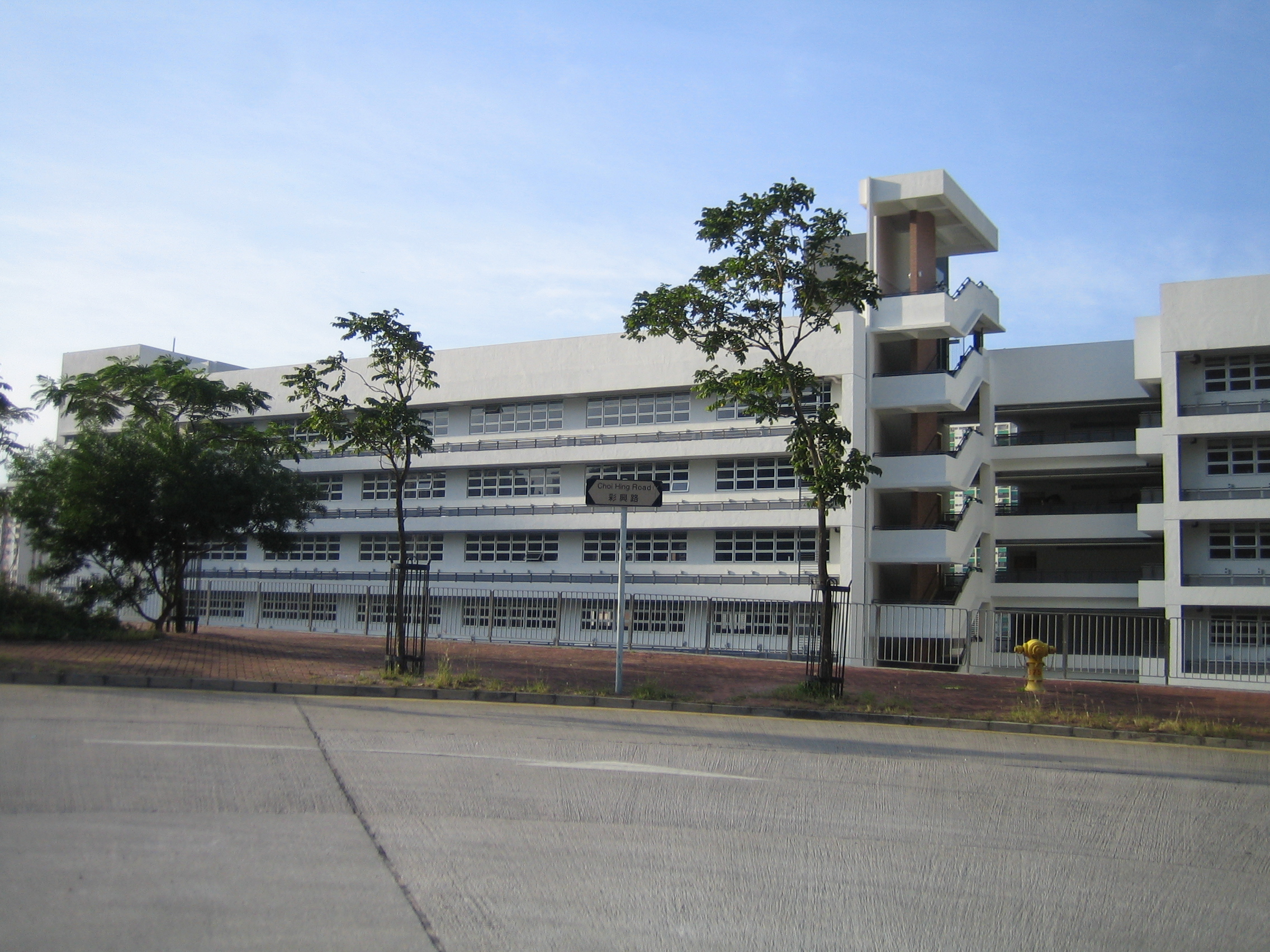

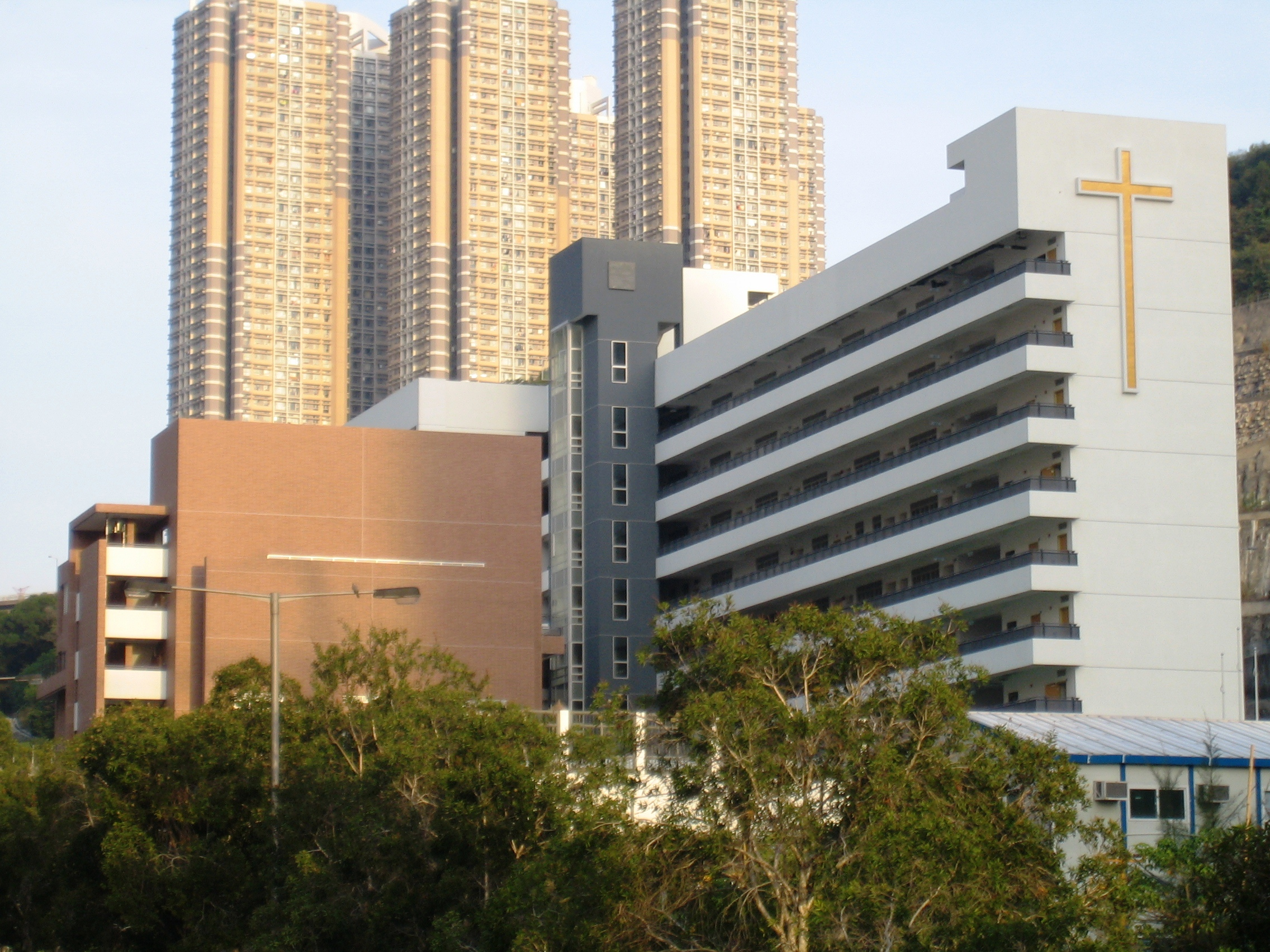

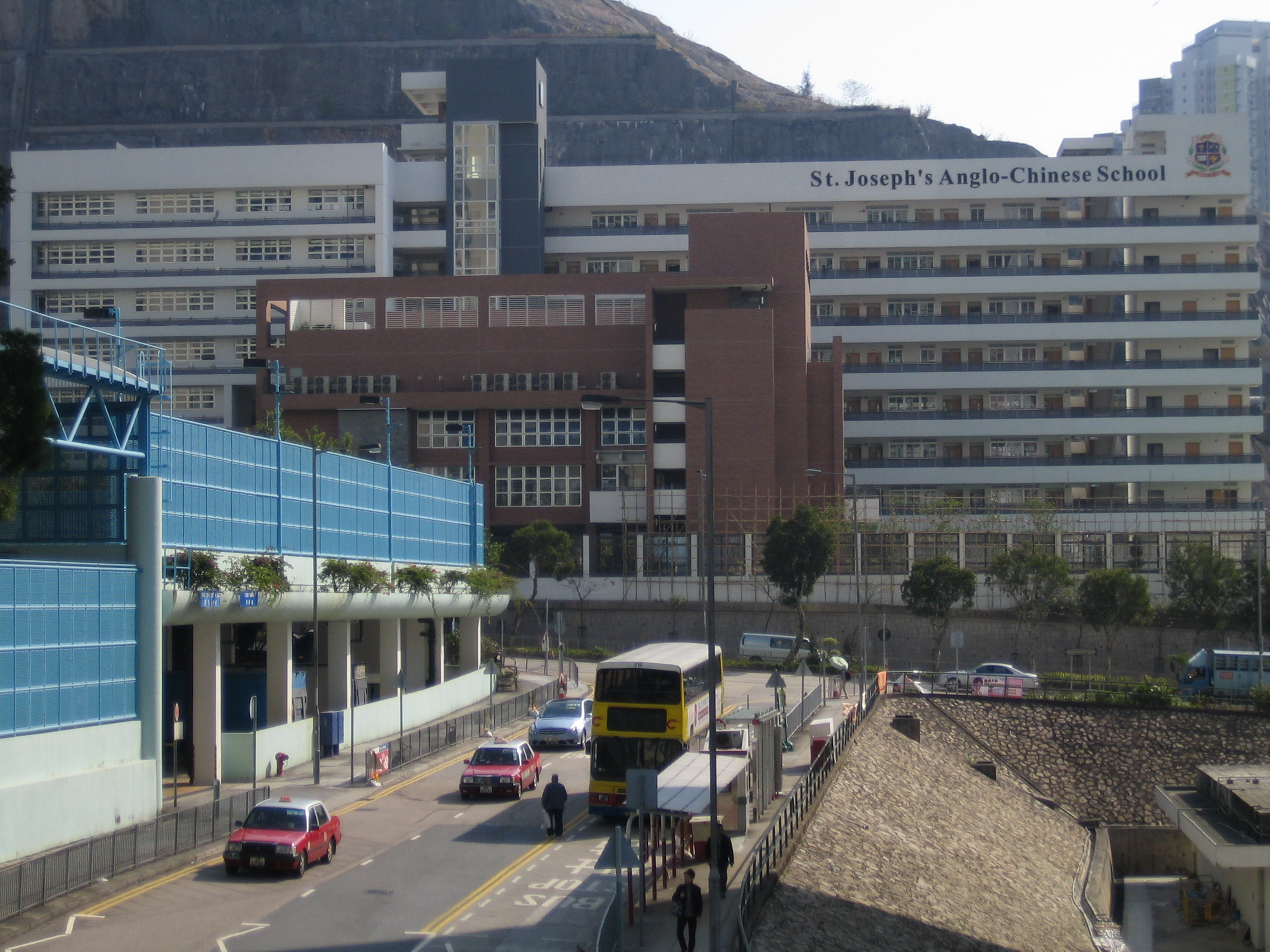

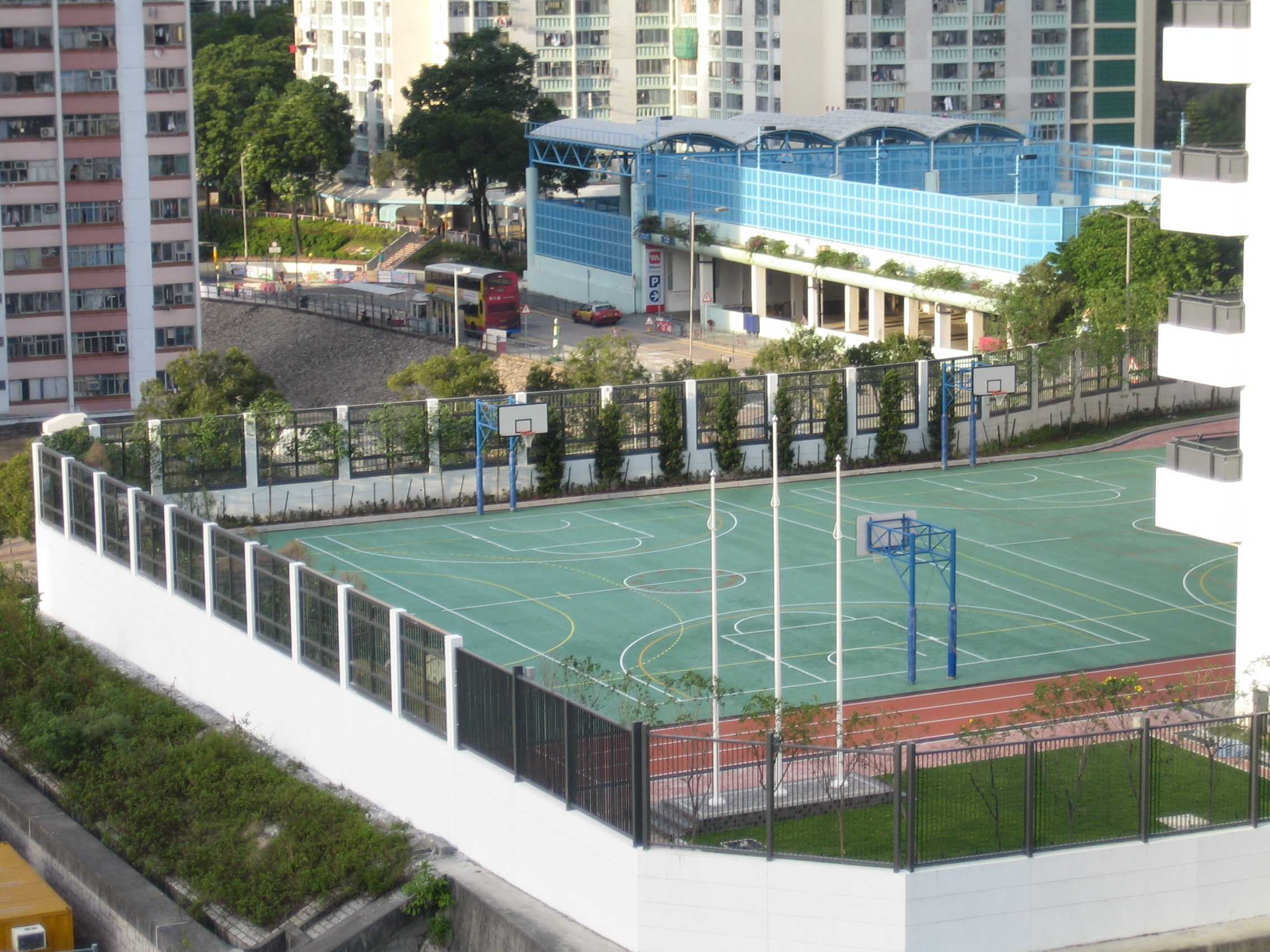

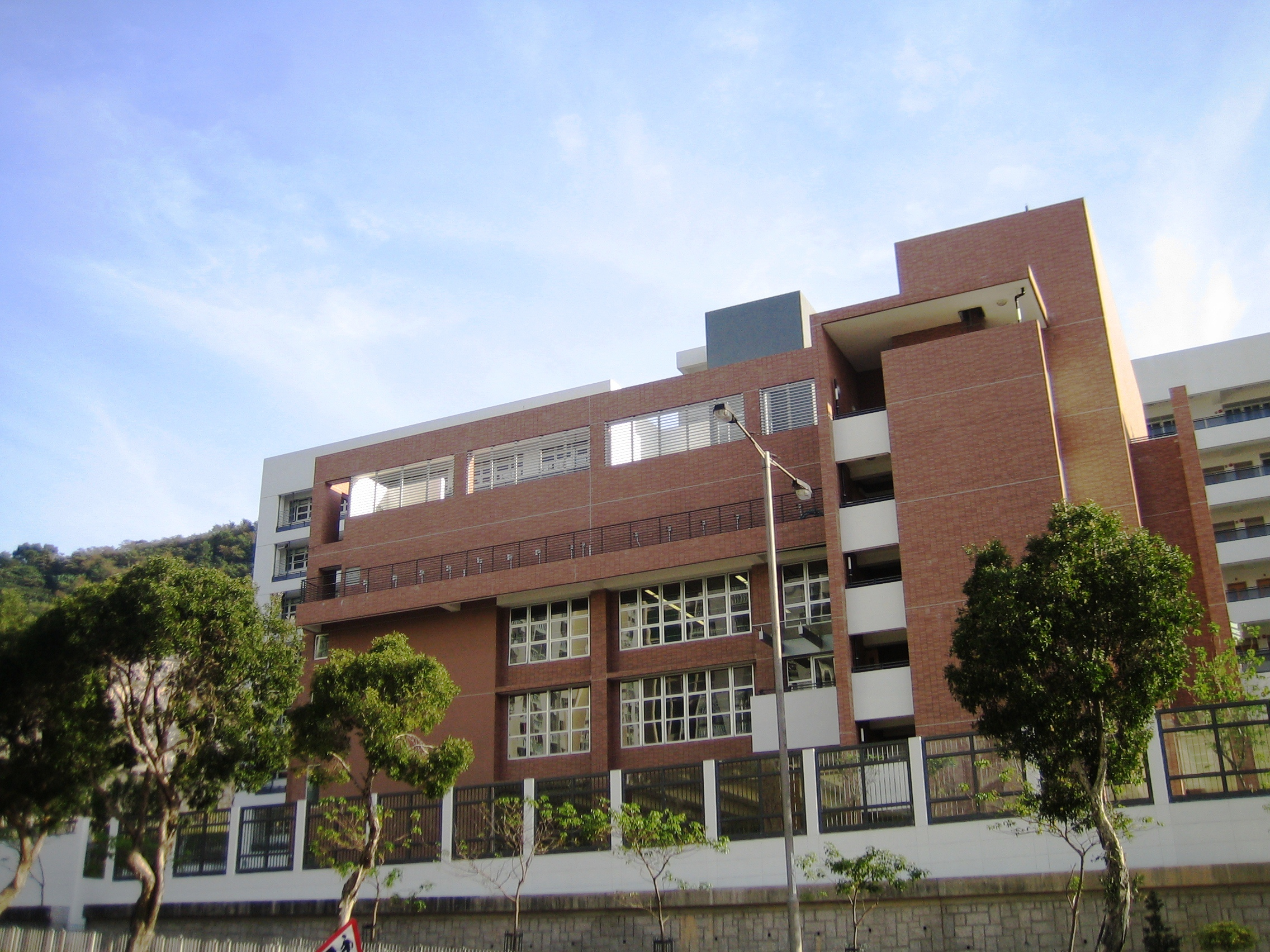

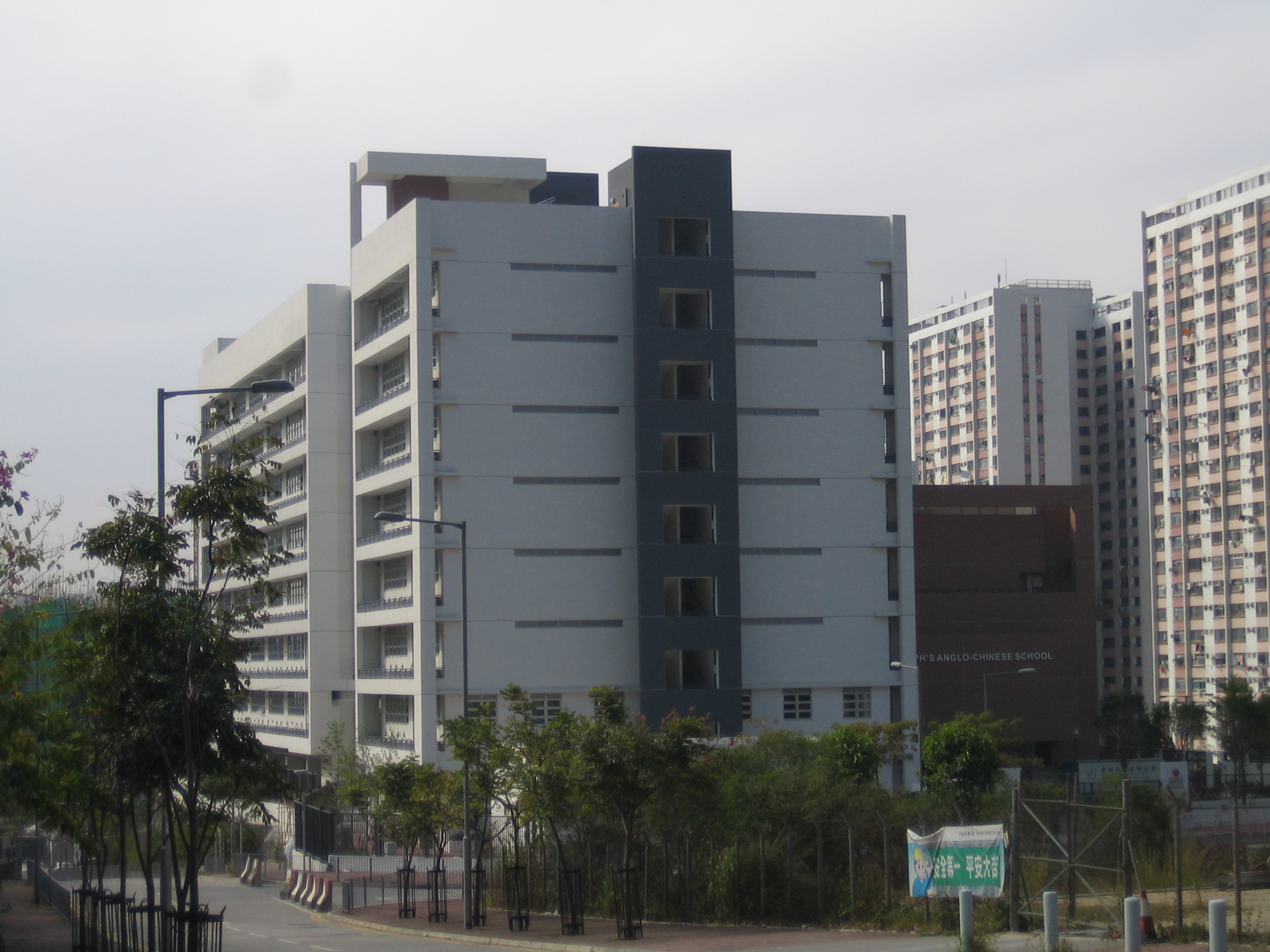

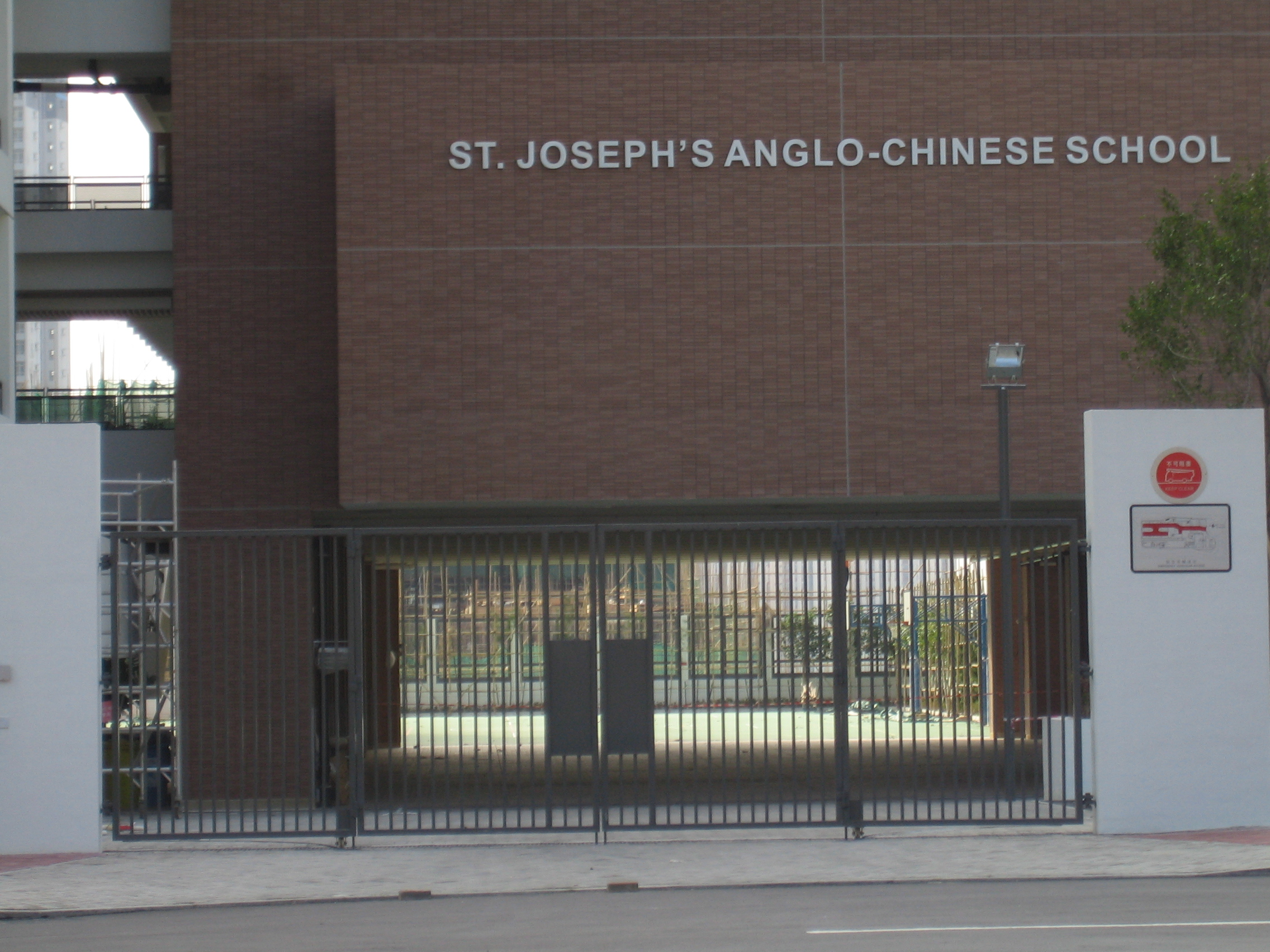
- Kwun Tong Road Ex-premise 22°19′49″N 114°12′40″E

The campus was located at 61 Kwun Tong Road, Ngau Chi Wan, Kowloon, near Kai Yip Estate, Kowloon Bay, Jordan Valley, Ping Shek Estate, Choi Hung Estate.

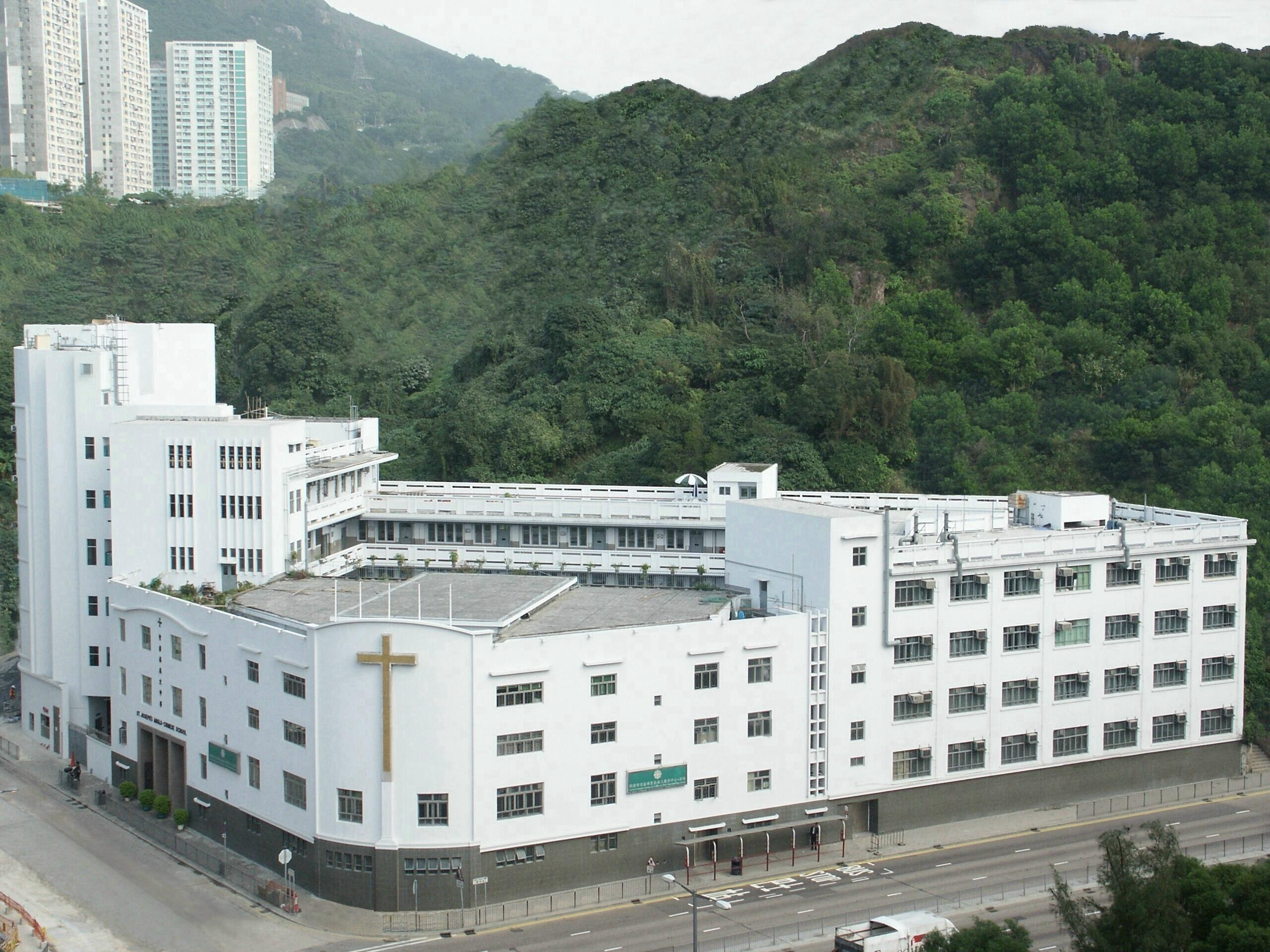

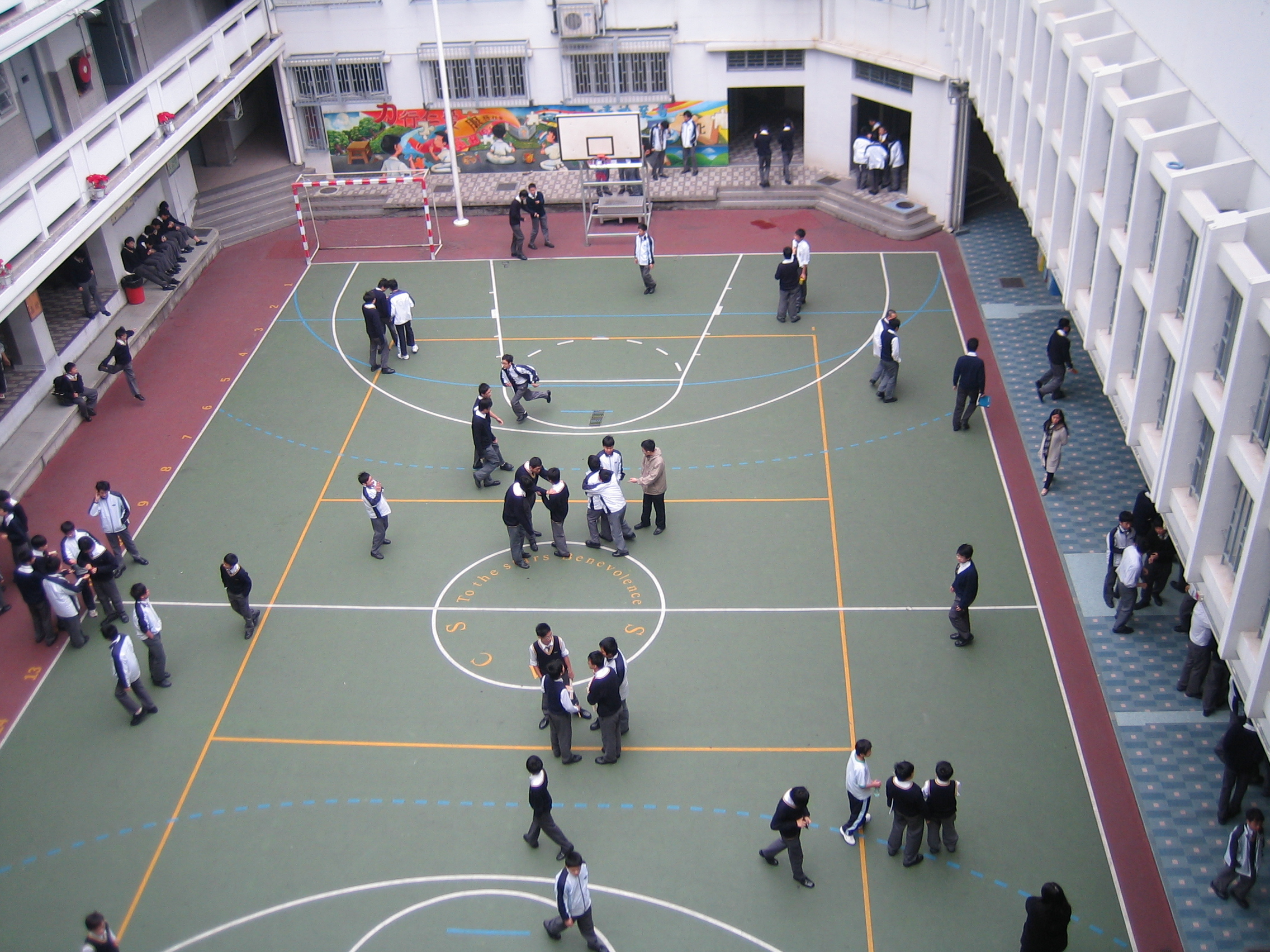
Playground

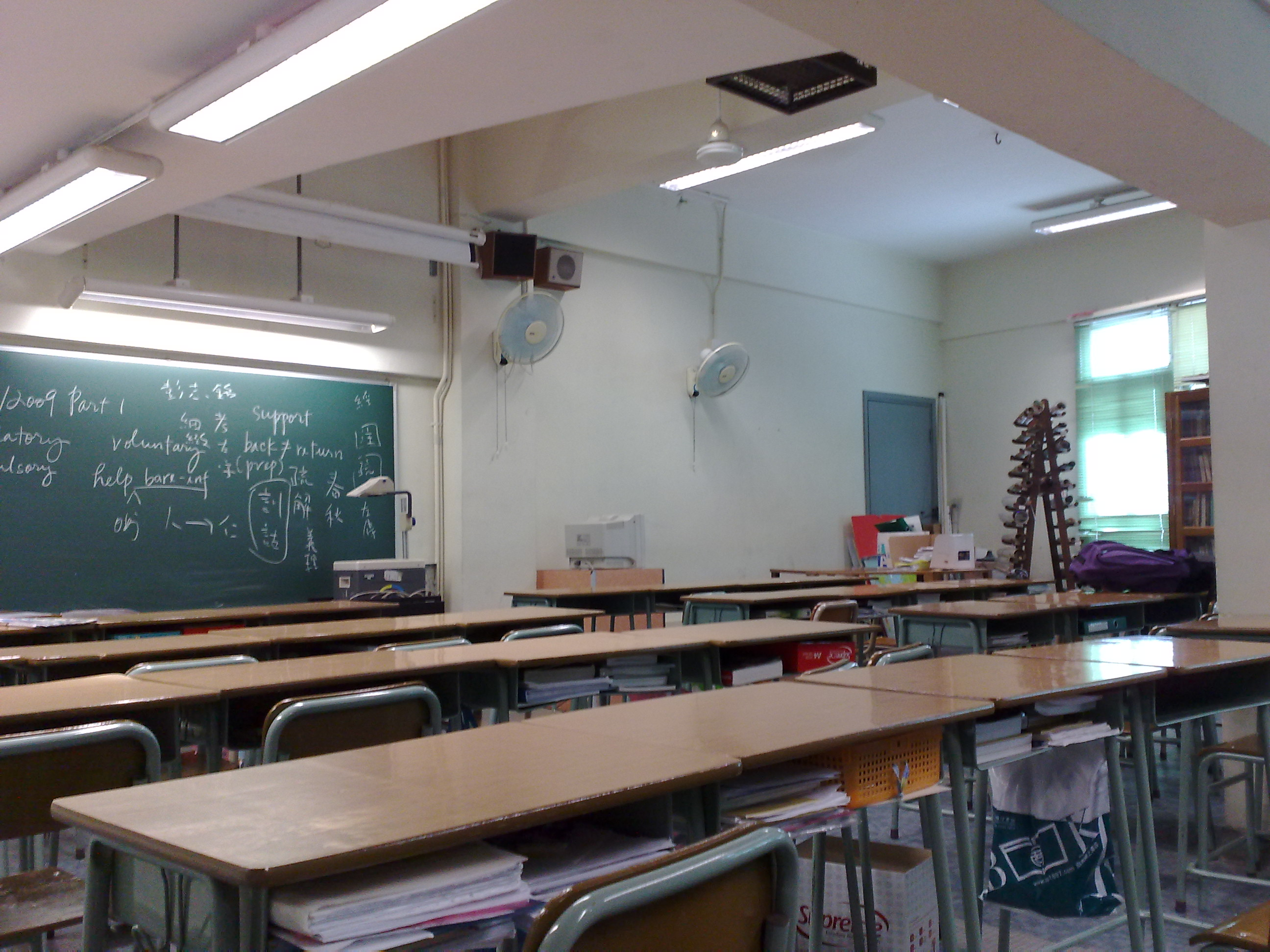
Classroom

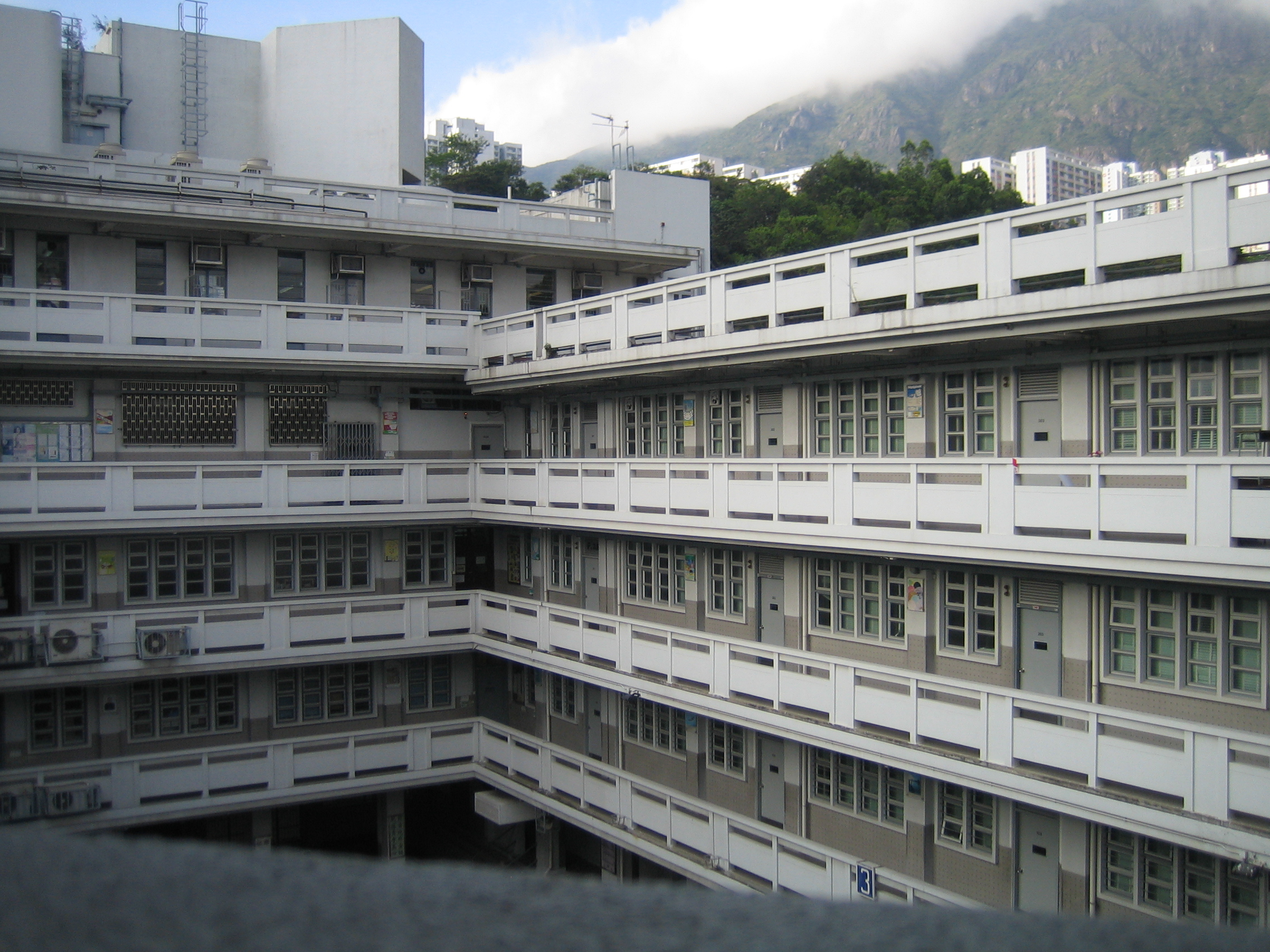
Corridor

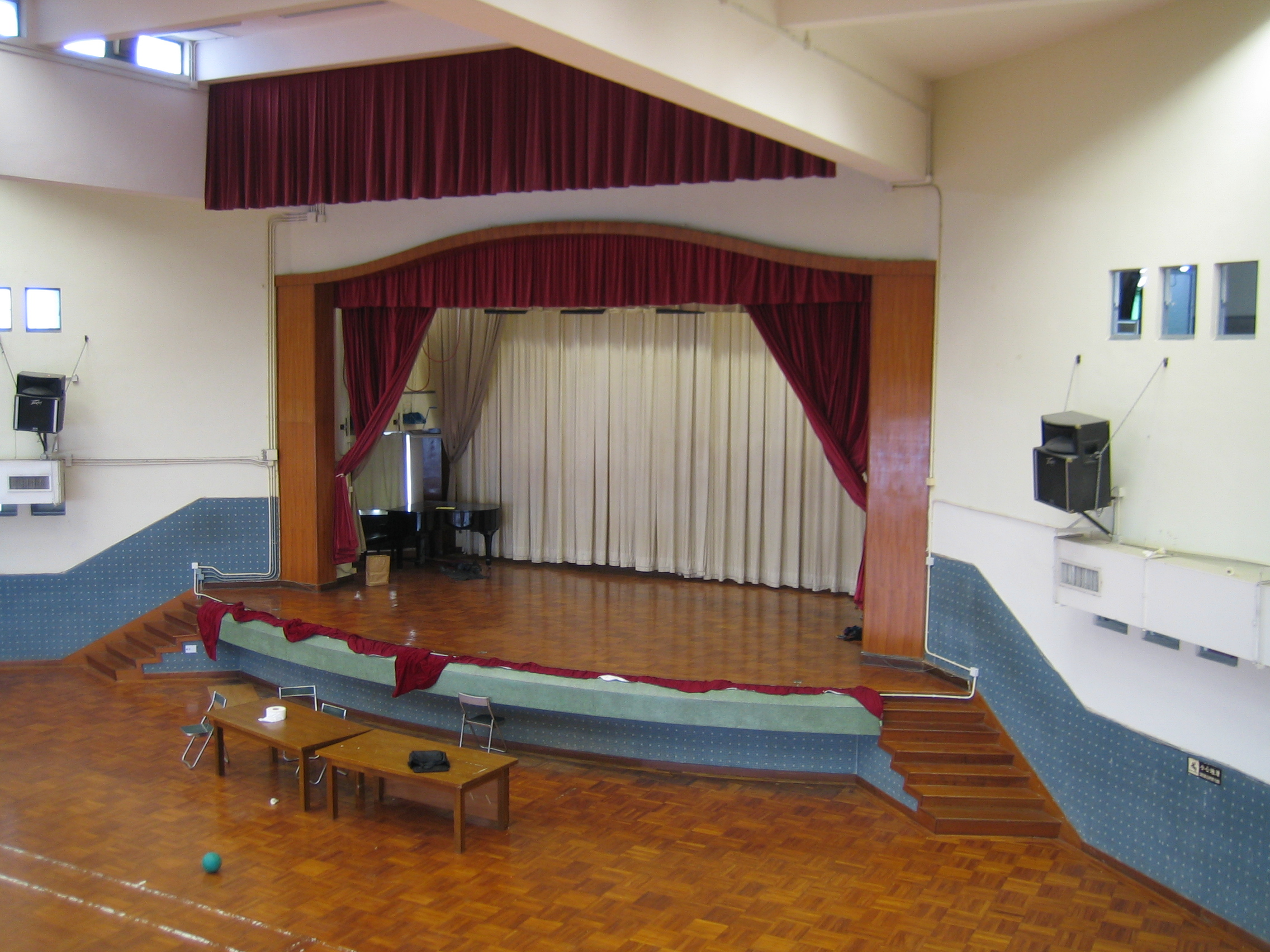
School Hall

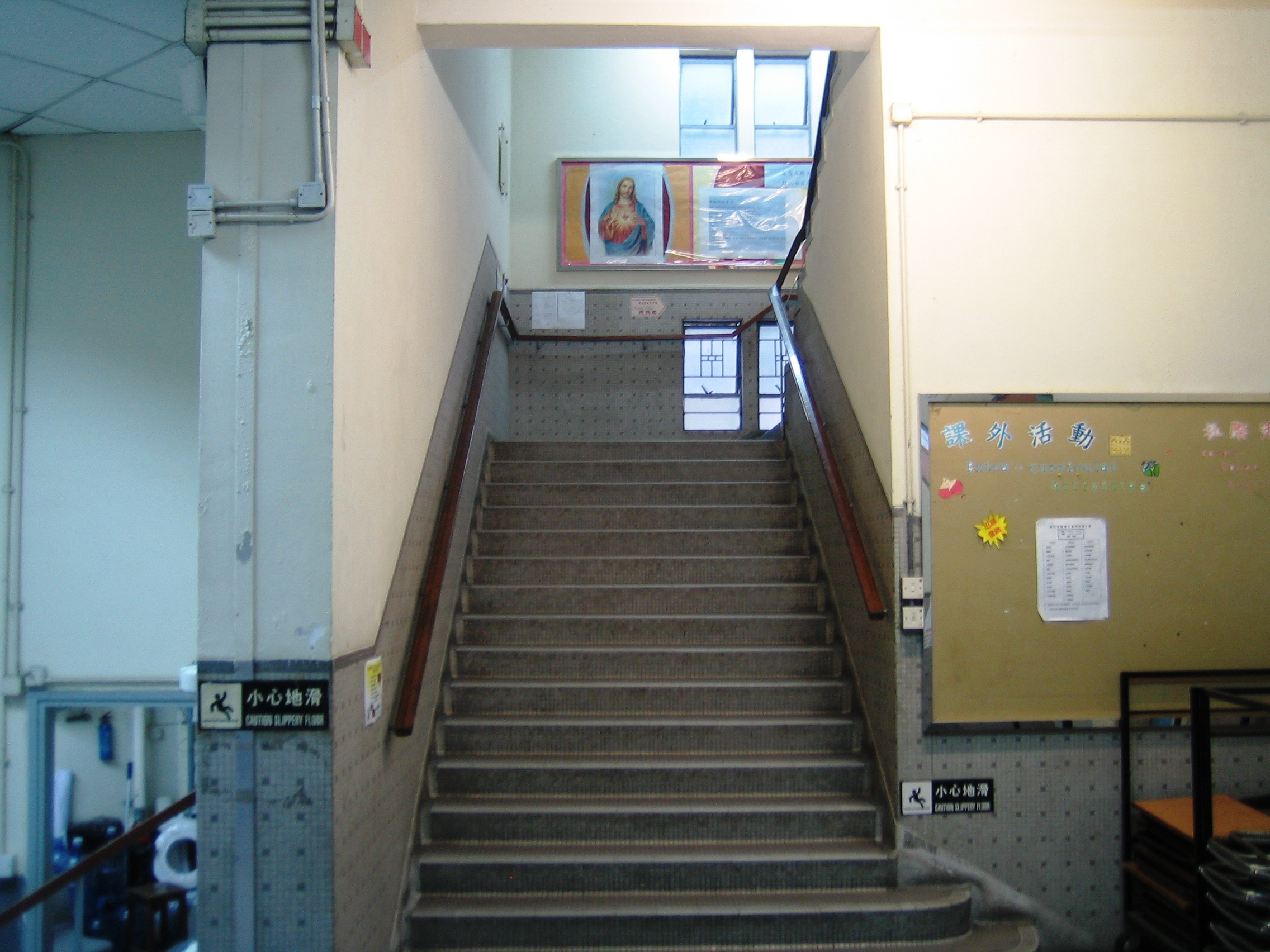
No. 1 Staircase

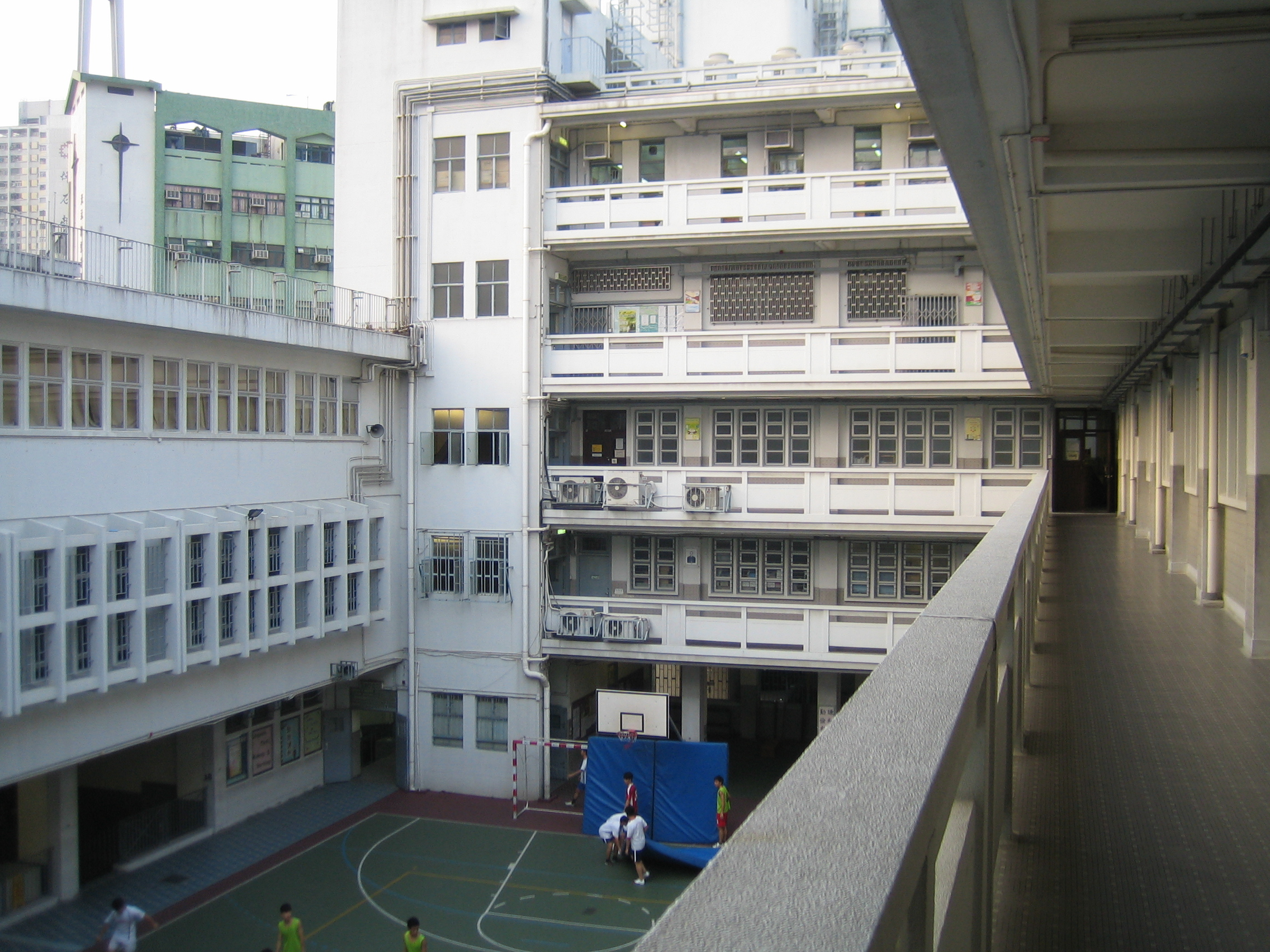
Corridor of 2/F

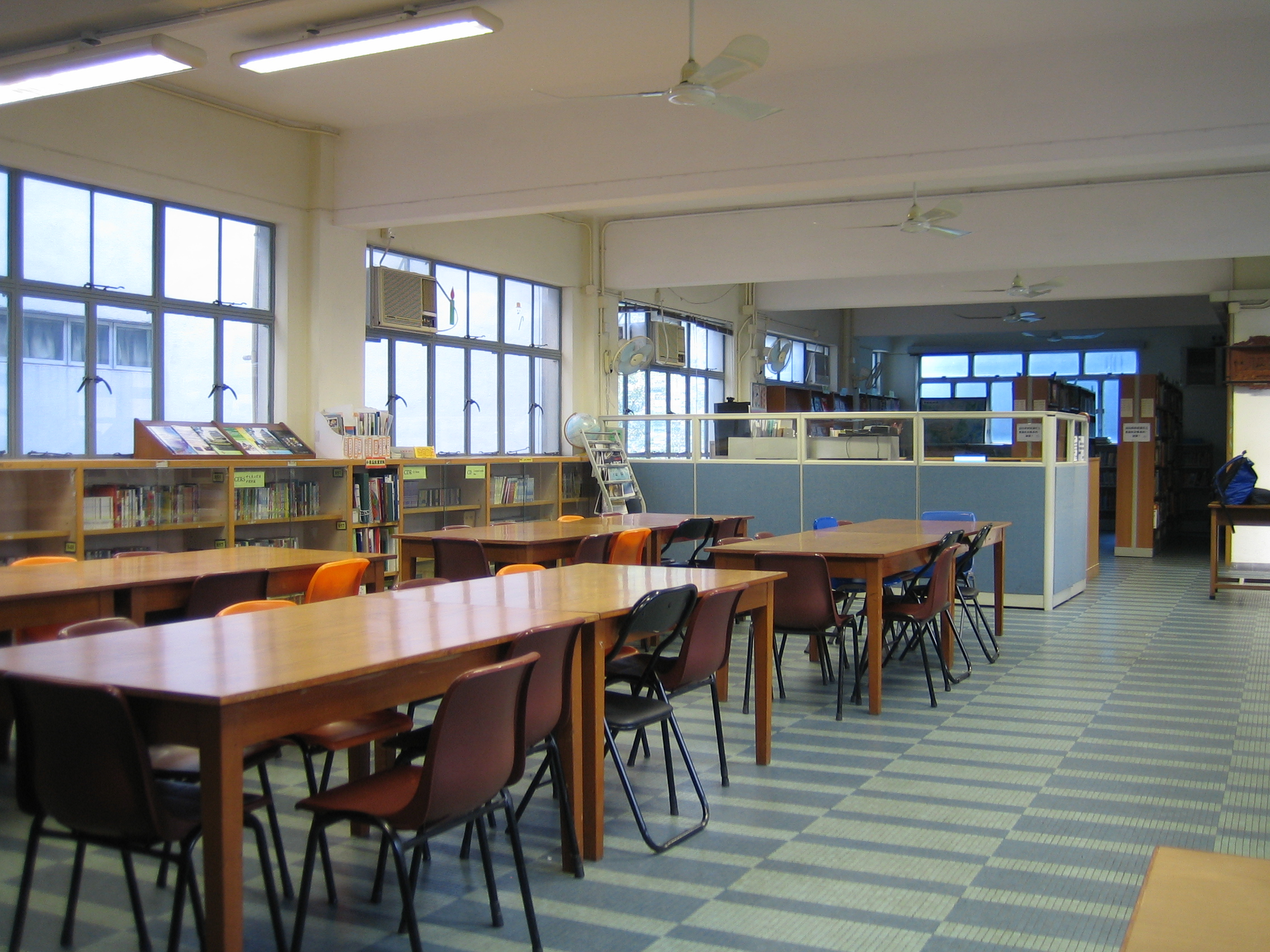
Library

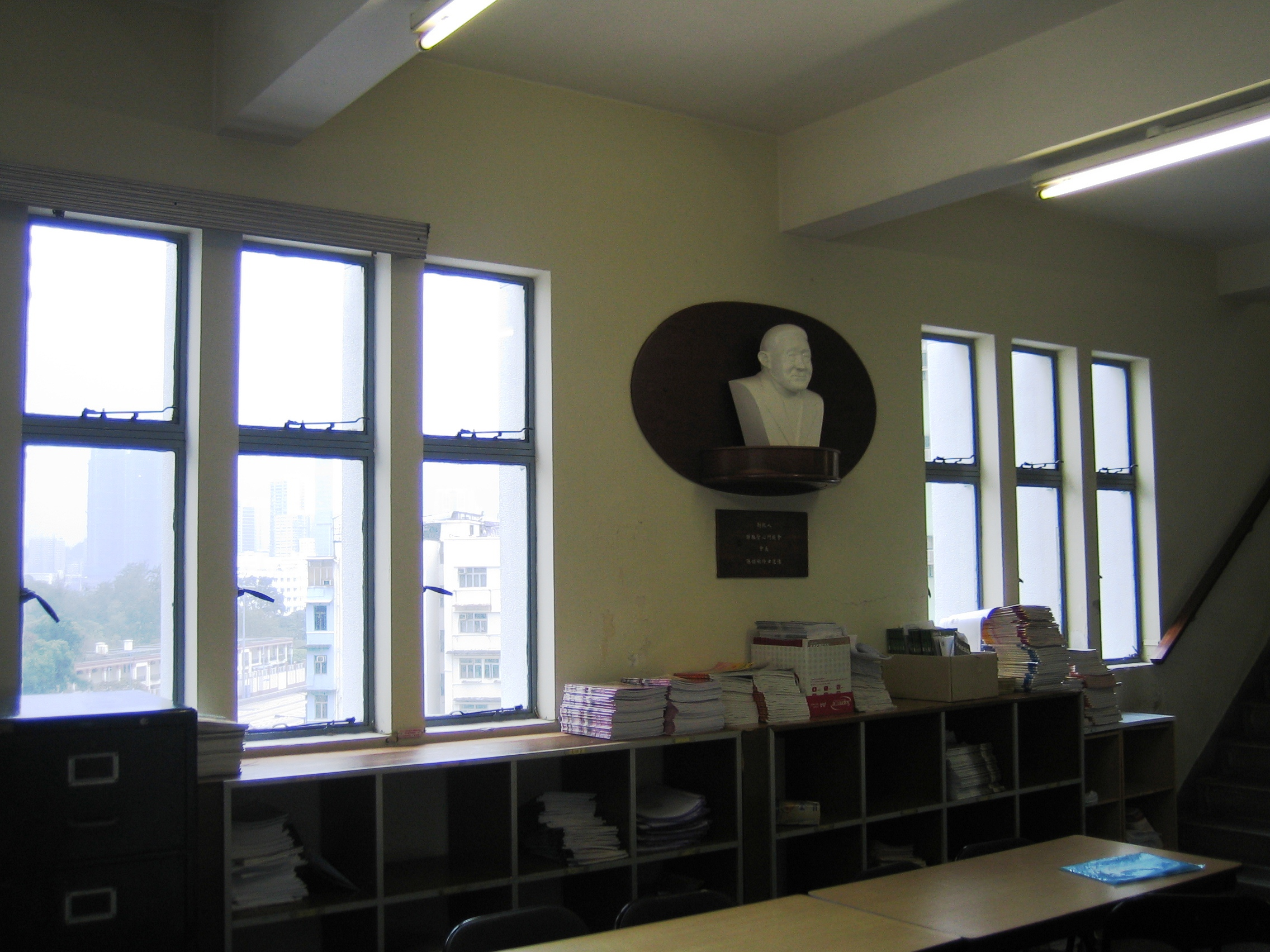
Staff Room

== See also ==
- Education in Hong Kong
- List of secondary schools in Hong Kong
