= Academia de San Jose =

Roman Catholic school in Mandaue, Philippines

Coordinates: 10°19′40″N 123°56′33″E

Information
- Established: January 29, 1964

Academia de San Jose, formerly known as St. Joseph's Academy (SJA), was founded on January 29, 1964, by Monsignor Jose Alojipan. Its first principal was Marie Consejo, ICM.

== School Philosophy of Academia de San Jose ==
Academia de San Jose Is grounded on the belief that Evangelizing Education is at its best when integral fosters the Giuseppians' configuration to the Mind and Heart of Jesus Christ, thereby enabling them to participate in the realization of God's Kingdom of truth and life, of holiness and grace of justice, love and peace.

== History ==
Academia de San Jose (formerly: St. Joseph's Academy) was founded on 29 January 1964 by Msgr. Jose A. Alojipan. This was after the Archbishop of Cebu, His Eminence Julio R. Cardinal Rosales, requested him to establish a Catholic school in Mandaue Parish. The ICM Religious Sisters (Immaculati Cordis Mariae) was tapped to help prepare for the opening of the 1964–1965 school year.

In July 1966, the Congregation of the Missionary Sisters of the Immaculate Heart of Mary was designated by the Archbishop of Cebu as the steward of ASJ. The first secondary graduation took place in 1968. Two years after, the first elementary graduation came to pass.

Through the years, ASJ strove to grow in social consciousness towards the evangelization of the poor and the promotion of a lifestyle of simplicity. January 2001 witnessed the groundbreaking and the blessing ceremony of the Mother Marie Louise de Meester Multipurpose Building. This milestone reinforced the hopes and dreams of all those who wished ASJ to soar to greater heights of academic excellence and spiritual fervor.

ASJ's faith, hope, and love were challenged when a terrible fire, which started at the nearby public market, destroyed the administration building. But this only galvanized the administration's resolve to relentlessly pursue integral human and Christian development despite limitations imposed by institutional resources. During this time also, administrative discussions about the possibility of turning over the school to the Archdiocese of Cebu became very animated.

His Eminence Ricardo J. Cardinal Vidal, the Archbishop of Cebu, right away commissioned the Superintendent of the Archdiocesan Catholic Schools of Cebu, Fr. Eduardo V. Oriente, PhD, to take over as ASJ's School Director effective School Year 2003-2004 which was also the last year of the ICM management. With courage and determination, the School Director envisioned a development plan with the able assistance of the new Basic Education Principal, Perlita S. Quinones, EdD.

The construction of a five-story building, christened as the Ricardo J. Cardinal Vidal Quincentennial Building, to replace the burned edifice started in February 2006. It was inaugurated and blessed on 10 September 2007 in the presence of a jubilant and grateful community.

29 January 2014 marked the Golden Foundation Anniversary and the beginning of another chapter in the grace-filled ongoing story of Academia de San Jose. Fr. Jesper John R. Petralba, EdD, DM, PhD, DPA, Fr. Mariano Dioscoro E. Cuarto, MASL, and Maria Alma T. Flores, DevEdD were appointed as the new school director, school treasurer, and basic education principal, respectively. Building on all the sincere efforts of their predecessors, they successfully toiled to render ASJ worthy of PAASCU (Philippine Accrediting Association of Schools, Colleges, and Universities) Level I status on 25 November 2014.

School Year 2015-2016 saw the complete integration of ASJ into the Archdiocesan Catholic Schools of Cebu System as well as the laying down of the foundations of its Senior High School Program and the rehabilitation of the old Mandaue's Lot #5 owned by the Archdiocese of Cebu to serve as the learning community's strategic evacuation center, workshop, and parking area. From 2017 to 2018 the following major projects—among others—were accomplished: the construction of the Oratory of Saint Joseph the Worker, the Proclamation of Christ, the Giuseppe Covered Court and the Multi-purpose Hall, the procurement of new school vehicles, the creation of the ASJ Education Commission on Catholic Education, and the PAASCU Rooms, the air-conditioning of all classrooms of the Jubilee Hall, and the repainting of the entire campus.

Fr. Sherwin Leo O. Ferrater, JCL, MAPM became part of the administrative team in 2017. PAASCU-FAAP granted Level II Re-Accredited Status to ASJ on 15 December 2017 valid until 22 November 2022. In 2019, Fr. Conrado C. Sedillo Jr., DM and Fr. Andrei Mikhail S. Tabotabo, MAPM were appointed Basic Education Principal and School Treasurer respectively. A couple of years after, Fr. Alberto D. Cabag Jr., MAT was appointed as Human Resource Development Coordinator.

The Corona Virus Disease (COVID-19) pandemic plagued the world in 2020. As a result, ASJ operationalized a graduated transition from emergency remote pedagogy to blended educational modalities as the school population strived for institutional survival and mission continuance. A drastic decrease in the school population necessitated the tightening of everyone's belts for institutional survival. To make matters worse, super typhoon Odette caused considerable damages to ASJ's physical plant and facilities on 16 December 2021. With a little help from its insurer, ASJ undertook repair and reconstruction works just in time for the progressive implementation of in-person classes and in view of the renewed preparation for PAASCU Re-accreditation Visit on 8 September 2023. Inspired by the indomitable spirit of its patron and titular, ASJ set its face to pursue its dedicated commitment to evangelizing education despite relentless regulatory challenges and the cloud of uncertainty looming on the horizon.

And the continuing revelation of God's immeasurable goodness unceasingly unfolds with each passing day of ASJ's educational ministry.
