= Ordon =

Ordon may refer to:

- Juliusz Konstanty Ordon, a Polish rebel
- Ordo (palace), a Mongolian mobile palace
