= Tomasz Strzeżek =

Polish historian and professor

Tomasz Strzeżek is a Polish historian and a professor at the University of Warmia and Mazury in Olsztyn. He specialises in the history of 19th-century Poland and Central Europe, notably the November Uprising. He authored numerous books on the topic, including one of very few monographs of the 1831 battle of Warsaw.
