= Lubomirski Ramparts =

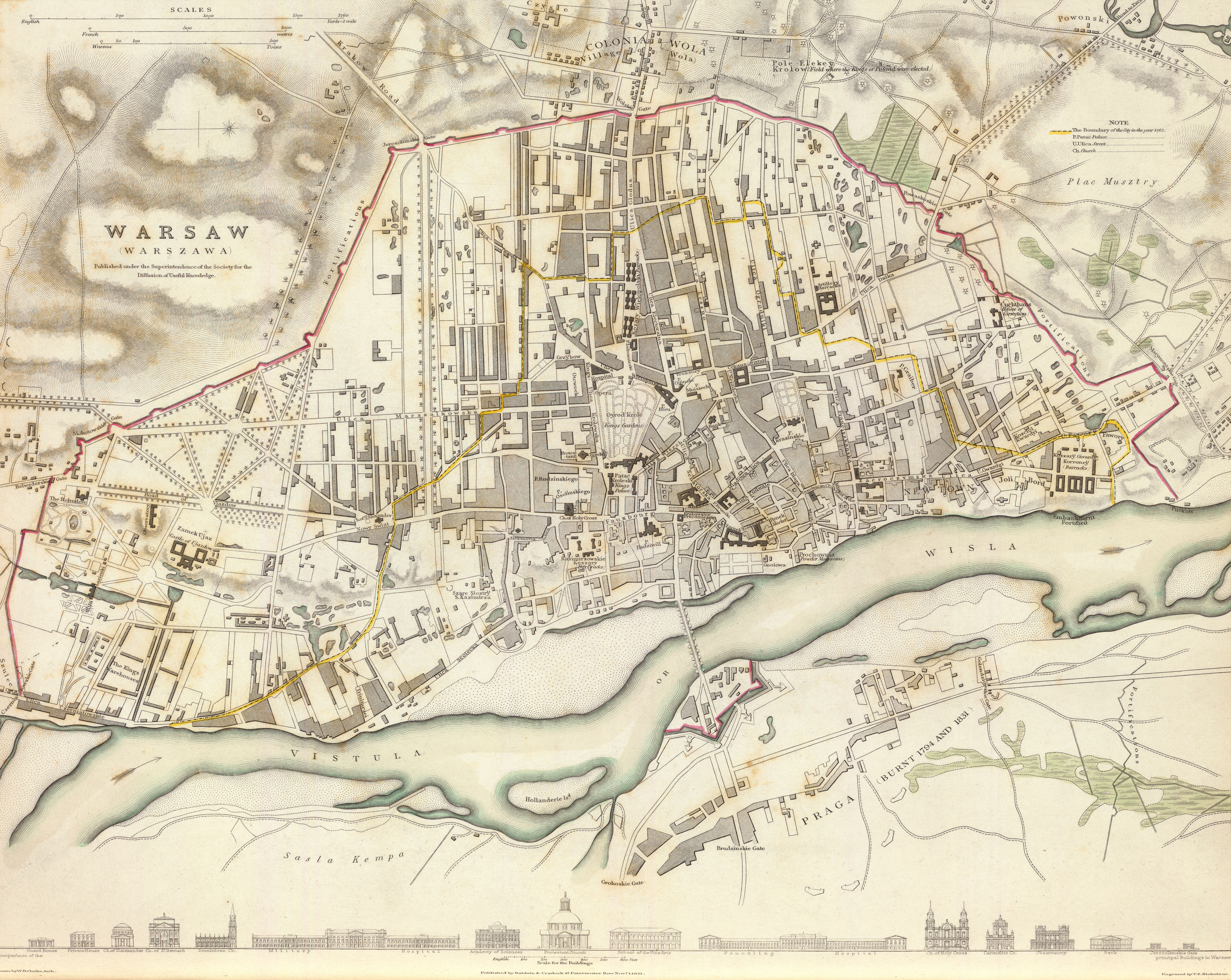
1831 map of Warsaw with Lubomirski's ramparts marked in red

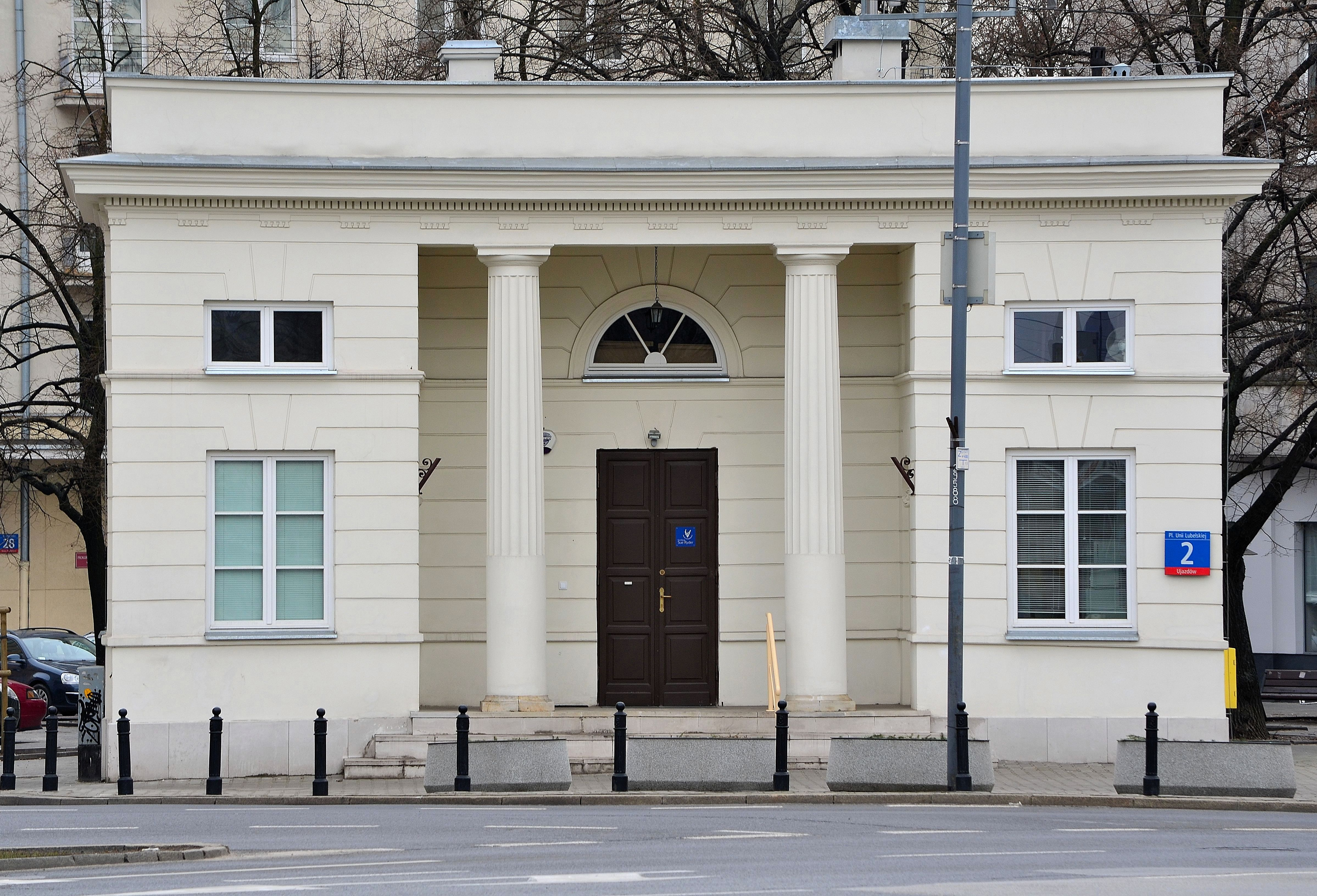
Rogatka Mokotowska, one of the toll houses erected in 1825 along the Lubomirski Ramparts to collect taxes on goods entering the city. This building is marked as Mokotowskie Gate at the map above, in the centre of the image, at the left edge).

Lubomirski Ramparts (Polish: Okopy Lubomirskiego) was a 12 kilometre-long earthwork surrounding the city of Warsaw in late 18th and 19th century. A line of earthworks with a dry moat separated the city of Warsaw from the countryside. Erected by Stanisław Lubomirski, the then Grand Marshal of the Crown, in 1770, it was intended as a sanitary measure to stop plague epidemics ravaging Central Europe at that time. Travellers were allowed to enter the city only through several breaches in the ramparts dubbed rogatki. The term later entered the Polish language to signify any kind of toll house.

The plague indeed missed Warsaw and the ramparts became the boundary of the city of Warsaw for the next century. The line was also used for tax purposes, as all goods entering the city were taxed. In 1794 the ramparts were partially strengthened to include military keeps and played some role in the defence of Warsaw against a joint Russian and Prussian siege of the city in the summer of that year. Around 1825 the president of Warsaw ordered the ramparts to be levelled and replaced with city streets. Their previous location still defined the city limits though. The line of former Lubomirski Ramparts also defined the inner line of the city's defences during the 1831 Battle of Warsaw. It was only in 1916 when areas outside of the Lubomirski Ramparts were incorporated into the city.

The former line of ramparts is commemorated by a number of streets with the Polish name of Okopy, including Okopowa Street, where a large Jewish Cemetery is located.
