= St. Lawrence's Church, Warsaw =

Coordinates: 52°13′37″N 20°56′39″E

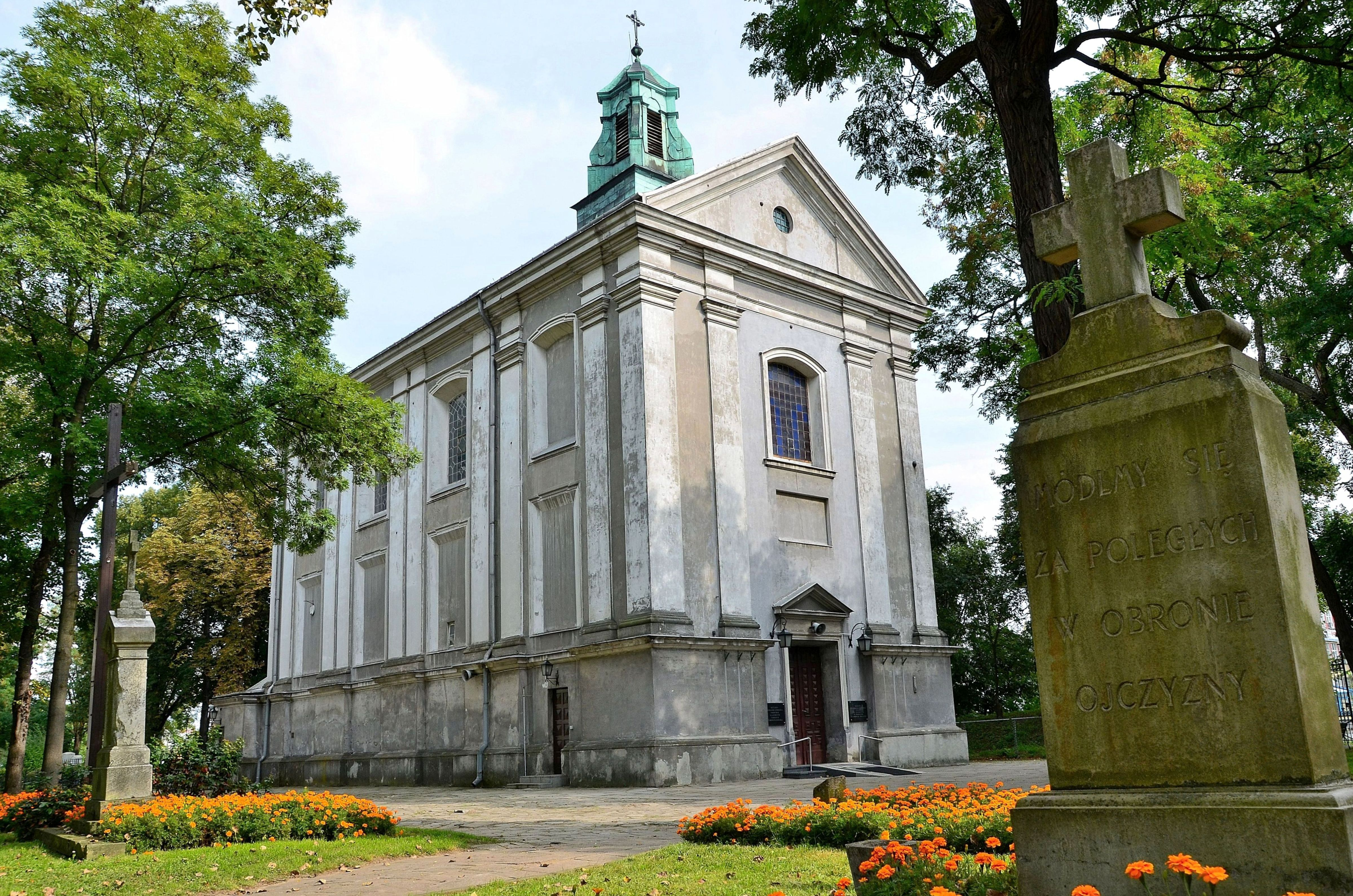
Modern view of St. Lawrence's Church

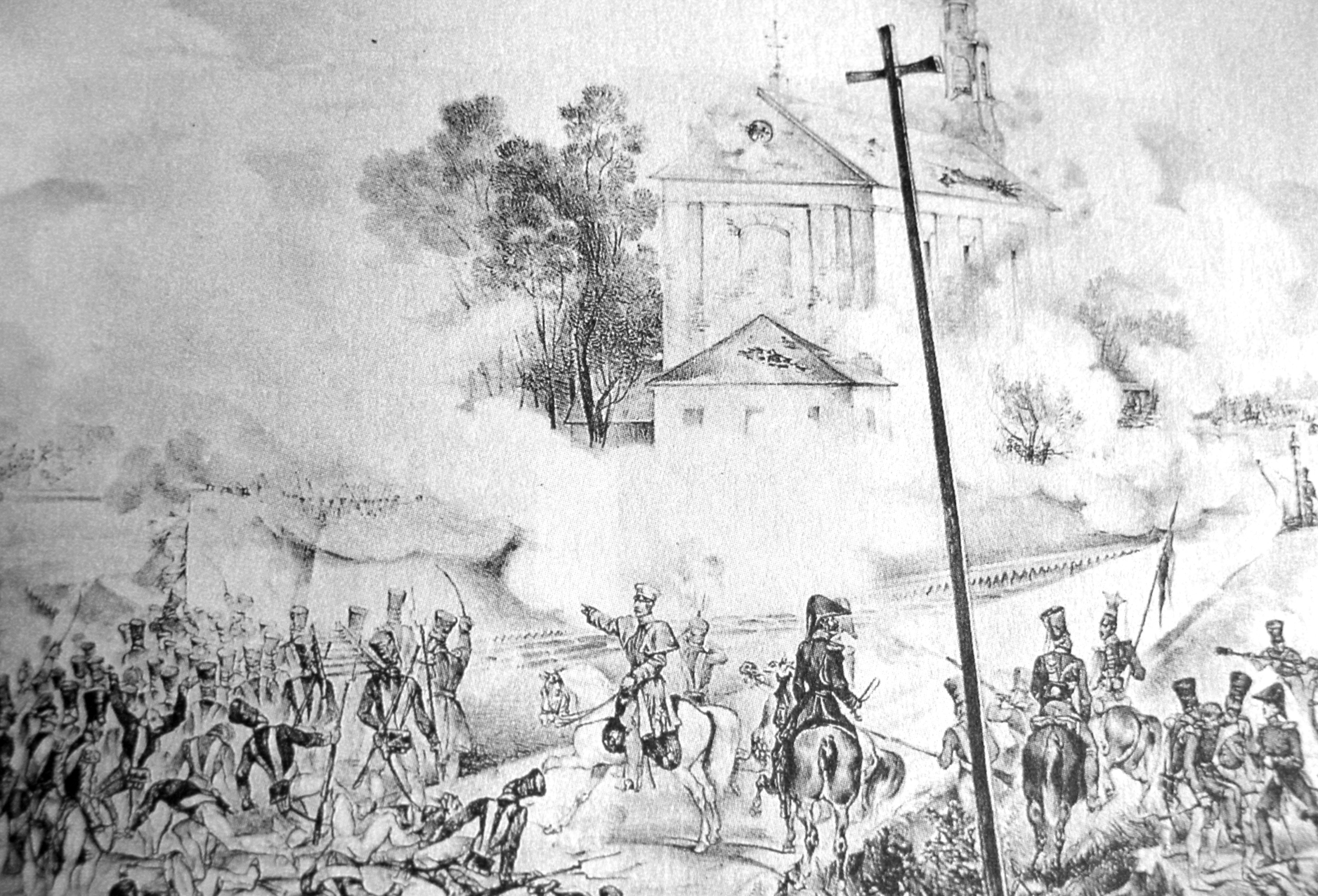
The church was one of the most important Polish positions during the Battle of Warsaw (1831)

St. Lawrence's Church (Polish: kościół św. Wawrzyńca) is a Roman Catholic church located in Warsaw's borough of Wola. A neoclassicist building, the site is best known as the central point of Polish "Redoubt No. 56" during the 1831 battle for Warsaw.

A small wooden church was built here as early as the 14th century. It was first mentioned in writing in a document by Antipope John XXIII dated 1412. Until the 17th century the church was just a branch of the St. John's Cathedral, and it was not until 1611 that a separate parish was founded in the village of Wielka Wola.

During the Deluge the wooden church was destroyed by Swedish forces, but was rebuilt soon afterwards. In 1695 the deacon of Warsaw Reverend Mikołaj Popławski founded a new church in its place, with the money donated by Queen-consort Marie Casimire Louise de La Grange d'Arquien. However, after King John III Sobieski died, the funds were withdrawn and it was not until 1755 that the construction works were finally finished. The building was designed by Joachim Daniel Jauch. After his death the works were supervised by Johann Friedrich Knöbel. During the Siege of Warsaw (1794) the area around the church was converted into a rampart for the Polish forces and the church was heavily damaged. Rebuilt in 1807, it was again rededicated in 1811. However, during the Russian siege of Warsaw in 1831 the area was again converted into a fort and the church was again heavily damaged.

After the fall of the November Uprising the church building was confiscated by Russian authorities. In line with official policy of Russification, it was converted into an Orthodox church devoted to the Holy Image of Our Lady of Vladimir, the patron-saint of the day Warsaw was captured by the Russians. To commemorate the battle, 12 barrels of Russian artillery were posted on the church walls.

Following the Great Retreat in 1915 the church was returned to the Catholics. In 1923 a new St. Lawrence's parish was created there. During the 1939 siege of Warsaw the church was only lightly damaged. However, during the Warsaw Uprising the Germans took the church and used it for the mass murder of civilians of Warsaw they had captured during the Wola massacre. After that the church was set on fire.

It was rebuilt after World War II, and now the church serves a small parish of roughly 1000 members. Most nearby inhabitants are now served by a new Good Shepherd's church (Kościół Dobrego Pasterza) built nearby at Redutowa Street.
