= Pavel Martynov =

Russian Lieutenant General

Pavel Petrovich Martynov (Russian: Павел Петрович Мартынов; 1782—1838) was a Russian military officer and a lieutenant general of the Imperial Russian Army. Born 17 August 1782 in Saratov Governorate, early in his life he joined the Izmaylovsky Regiment and in 1800 received officer's patent.

For his part in the Battle of Austerlitz he was awarded the Order of St. Anna 3rd Class. In 1808 he was promoted to the rank of captain and became a troop commander. In 1812 he was wounded at the Battle of Borodino, for which he received Order of St. Anna 2nd Class. The following year he was promoted to colonel and became the commanding officer of the 1st battalion in his regiment. In the Battle of Kulm he distinguished himself as a skilled commander, but was also wounded for the second time. For his role in the battle he received both Gold Sword for Bravery and the Kulm Cross.

Promoted to major general in 1820, on 30 November 1821 he became the commanding officer of the Izmaylovsky Lifeguard Regiment and later (since 14 March 1825) of the entire 3rd Infantry Division. With his forces he took part in the Russo-Turkish War of 1828–29 and fought in the Siege of Varna.

In 1831 he took part in the quelling of the November Uprising in Poland. He was heavily wounded in the Battle of Warsaw. For his gallantry he was again promoted and became the military commander of the Peter and Paul Fortress and the city of Sankt Petersburg. He died there on 14 February 1838 and was buried at the Alexander Nevsky Lavra.
