= Alexander Tukhachevsky =

Russian military officer (1793–1831)

- Александр Николаевич Тухачевский
- Born: 1793
- Died: 1831 (aged 37–38); Warsaw, Poland
- Military career
- Allegiance: Russian
- Branch: Army
- Rank: Colonel
- Commands: (14th) Olonets Infantry Regiment
- Conflicts: November Uprising

Alexander Nikolayevich Tukhachevsky (Russian: Александр Николаевич Тухачевский; 1793 – 1831) was a Russian military officer and a colonel of the Imperial Russian Army. A commanding officer of the (14th) Olonets Infantry Regiment, he took part in the Polish-Russian War of 1830 and was killed in the battle of Warsaw (1831). Coincidentally, his great-grandson Mikhail Tukhachevsky was defeated at the gates of Warsaw almost a century later.
