= Antoni Wroniecki =

Antoni Wroniecki (1790 - 1838) was a Polish military officer and a General of the Polish Army during the November Uprising of 1831.

Born in 1790 in Poznań, at the age of 16 he joined the army of the Napoleonic Duchy of Warsaw. During the 1812 invasion of Russia he was taken prisoner by the Russians in the Battle of Bobruysk. Released after the war, he returned to Poland and joined the armed forces of the newly established Kingdom of Poland in the rank of captain.

He quickly rose through the ranks. Initially the commanding officer of the 5th Line Infantry Regiment, he was soon promoted to lieutenant colonel. After the outbreak of the November Uprising of 1831 he briefly commanded the 4th Foot Rifles Regiment and then the 1st Brigade, 1st Infantry Division (between 28 February and 26 March 1831). He briefly served as the chief of staff of the 4th Infantry Division and was promoted to the rank of brigade general on 12 May 1831. During the Battle of Warsaw he commanded one of the sectors of Polish defence of the city.

After the Polish defeat he was among the highest-ranking Polish officers to cross the border into East Prussia where the remaining Polish forces capitulated. He then settled in France. He died 3 December 1838 in Paris and is buried at Montmartre Cemetery, in a common grave shared by many notable members of the Great Emigration, notably Joachim Lelewel.
