= Cyprian Belzig von Kreutz =

Russian Army general (1777–1850)

Graf Cyprian Belzig von Kreutz
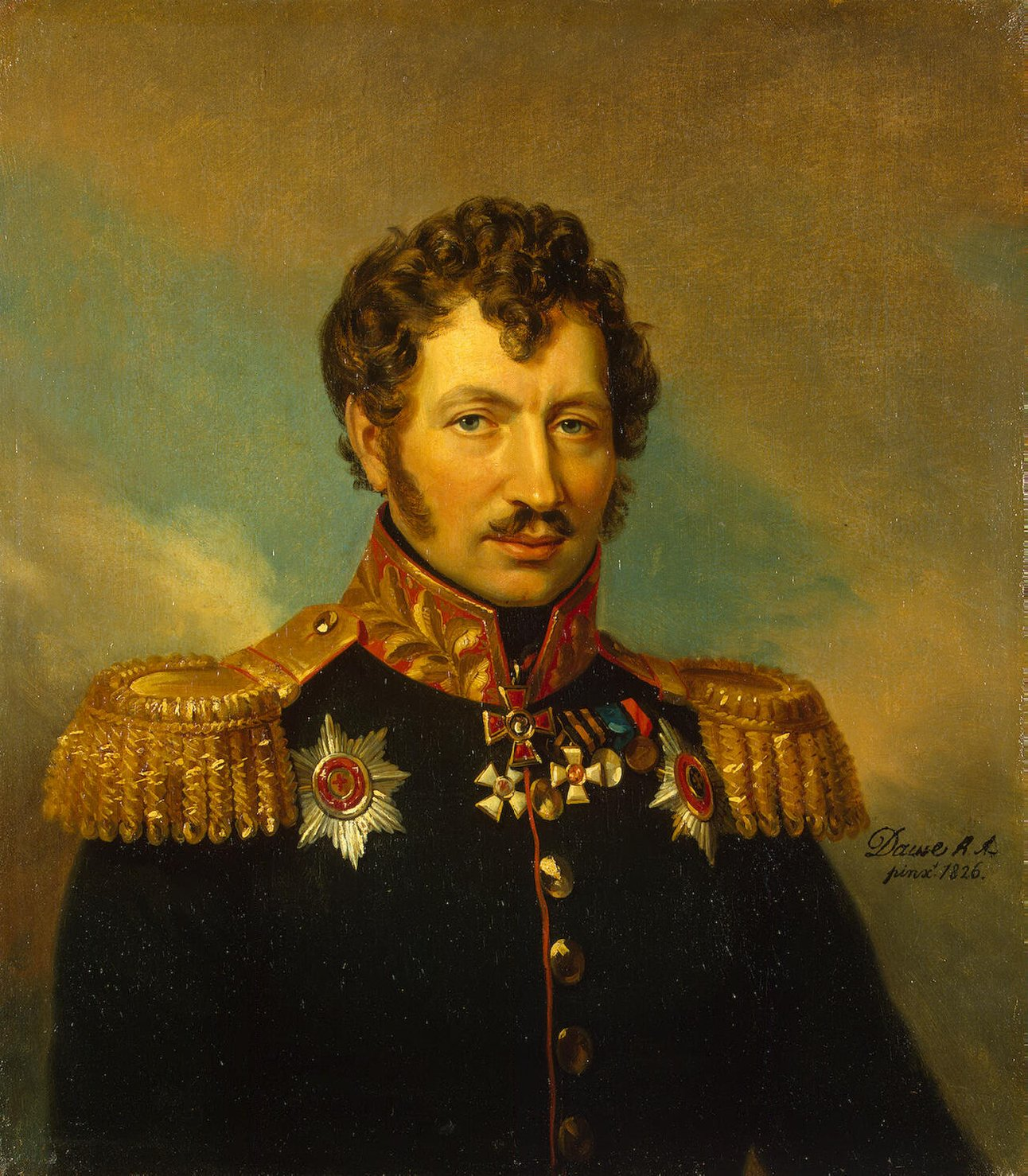
- Portrait by George Dawe, 1826
- Born: 10 July 1777; Rzeczyca, Minsk Voivodeship, Poland–Lithuania
- Died: 13 July 1850 (aged 73); Courland Governorate, Russian Empire
- Other name: Cyprian Antonovich Kreutz
- Military career
- Allegiance: Russia
- Branch: Russian Imperial Army
- Rank: General
- Conflicts: See battles: Napoleonic Wars; French invasion of Russia; Battle of Ostrovno; Battle of Klyastitsy; Battle of Smolensk (1812); Battle of Tarutino; Battle of Maloyaroslavets; Battle of Vyazma; Battle of Borodino (WIA); Russo-Turkish War; November Uprising; Battle of Warsaw
- Awards: Order of Saint George
- Other work: Governor-general of Schleswig

Cyprian Gualbert Heinrich Graf von Kreutz (Russian: Киприан Антонович Крейц, romanized: Kiprian Antonovich Kreyts; 10 July 1777 – 13 July [O.S. 1 July] 1850) was a general of the Russian Imperial Army known for his service in the Napoleonic Wars and the November Uprising.

== Early life and career ==
Kreutz was born in Rzeczyca (today Rechytsa), Minsk Voivodeship to the Baltic German branch of the Prussian noble Creytz (noble family). He began his military career in Poland-Lithuania in the service of King Stanisław August Poniatowski, with the rank of adjutant-general. In 1801 he served as colonel in the regiment of Valerian Zubov. Between 1805 and 1807 he took part in thirteen battles. Between 1808 and 1809 he was posted to the Baltic shore, and in 1810 he was named commander of a regiment of Siberian dragoons.

He participated in the campaign of 1812, fighting at Ostrovno, Klyastitsy, Smolensk, Tarutino, Maloyaroslavets, and Vyazma. On 15 June he was promoted to major general. On 30 June he commanded troops at Ashmyany. At the Battle of Borodino he was wounded in action. He led numerous campaigns in the following two years, and in 1814 was appointed governor general of the Duchy of Schleswig.

On 11 December 1824 he was made lieutenant general, and participated in the Russo-Turkish War, in the Principality of Moldavia and in Bulgaria. After these campaigns he retired from active service.

He came out of retirement during the November Uprising of 1830, and contributed to the Polish defeat on the southeastern front. In August 1831 he took part in the capture of Warsaw. In September he was decorated with the Order of Saint George.

Kreutz died at his estate in the Courland Governorate.

== Sources ==
- Словарь русских генералов
- Крейц: портрет и послужной список
- Kneschke, Ernst Heinrich (1854). Deutsche Grafen-Haeuser der Gegenwart, Band I, Seite 207-210. Leipzig: Weigel. (de)
