= Nikolai Sulima =

Russian statesman and military commander

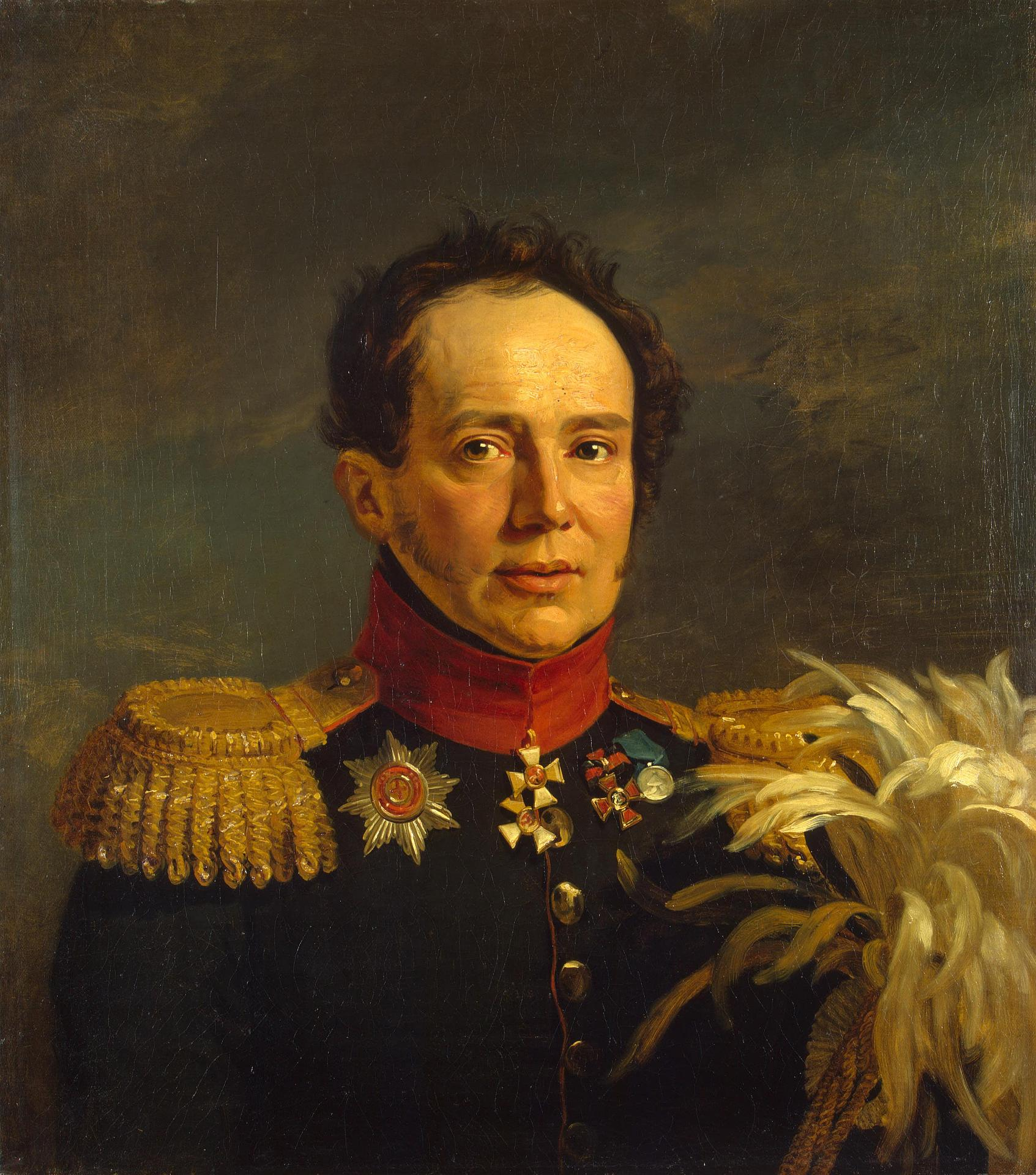
General Nikolai Sulima, a portrait by George Dawe

Nikolai Sulima (Russian: Николай Семёнович Сулима; 12 January [O.S. 1 January] 1777 – 21 October [O.S. 9 October] 1840) was a Russian statesman and military commander, a General of the Imperial Russian Army during Napoleonic Wars and the November Uprising. A distant descendant of hetman Ivan Sulyma and numerous Polish noble families, he joined the army early in his life.

He was taken prisoner in the Battle of Austerlitz, but was exchanged for a French officer soon afterwards. During the Russian campaign against Poland in 1831 he took part in the Battle of Warsaw. Named governor of Eastern Siberia in 1833 and then Western Siberia in 1834, in 1836 he was recalled to Sankt Petersburg where he joined the State Control Council. He died in 1840. Peter Kropotkin was his grandson, through his daughter Ekaterina Nikolaevna Sulima.
