= Juliusz Konstanty Ordon =

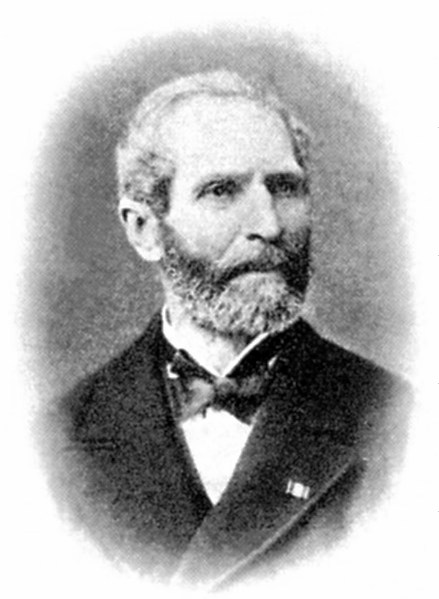
Julian Konstanty Ordon

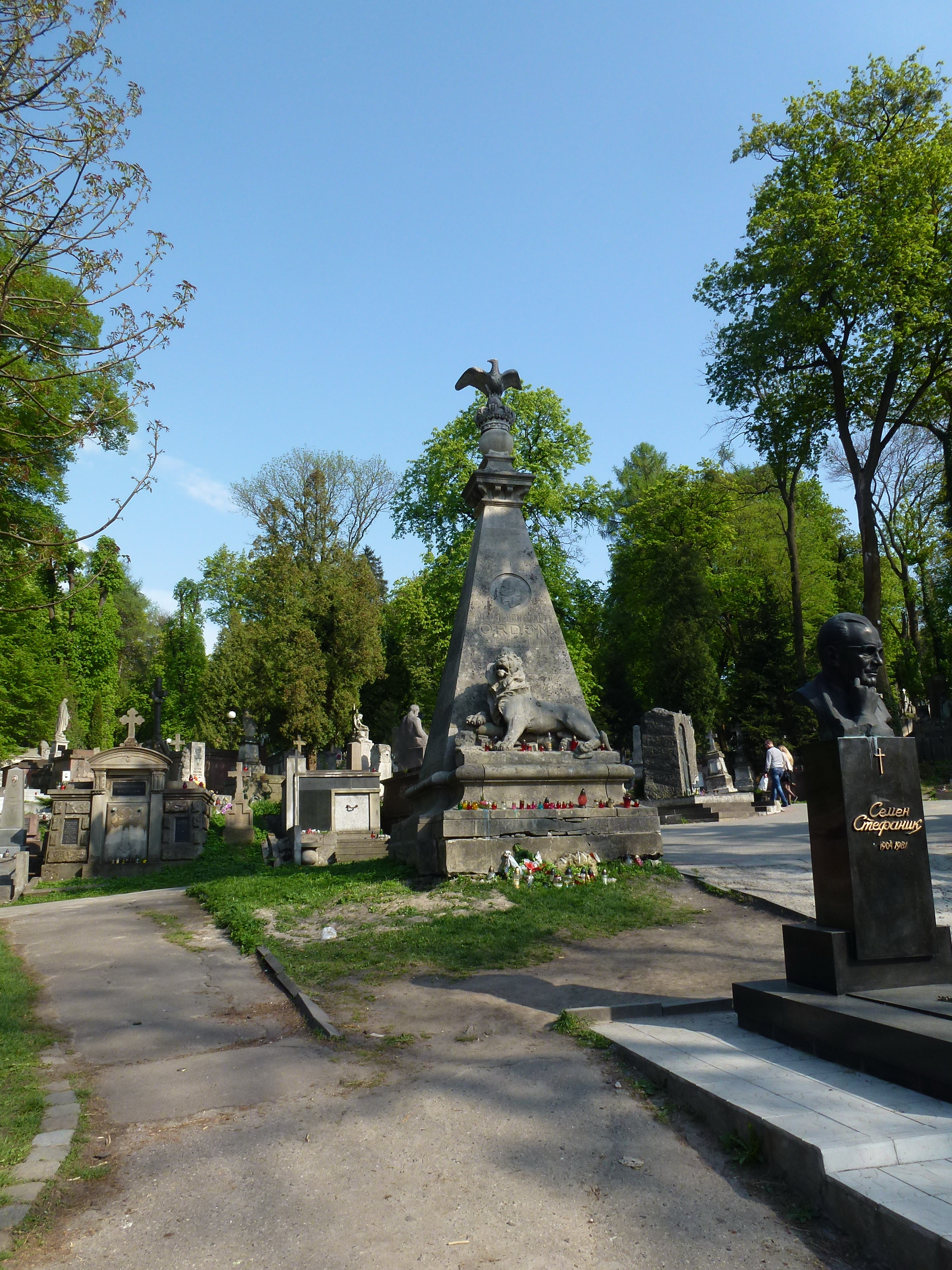
Tomb of Juliusz Konstanty Ordon, Łyczakowski Cemetery in Lviv

Konstanty Juliusz Ordon (often referred to as Konstanty Julian Ordon; born in Warsaw, 16 October 1810, died in Florence, 4 May 1887) was a participant in the Polish November Uprising in 1830–1831.

== Biography ==
Ordon distinguished himself as a commander of artillery in Fort 54 one of the redoubts in Wola during the storm of Warsaw by Russian Army on 6 September 1831. In the last moments of its defence the redoubt was blown up by one of the defenders, who was mistakenly identified as Ordon. He was immortalized in the poem of Adam Mickiewicz, Reduta Ordona (Ordon's Redoubt).

Apparently this was not the case since he survived the assault and was taken war prisoner by Russians. From 1833 on he lived in Dresden, then he settled in Scotland. Around 1840 he joined the English Freemasonry, and in October 1847 was admitted to Polish national lodge in London. He was involved with the Polish Democratic Society. In 1848 he moved to Milan willing to join the Polish Legion of Adam Mickiewicz. Poorly received, eventually he found himself in the Lombard Legion.

In October 1848 he entered the Sardinian army, where he served until 1855. In autumn 1856 he moved to France and settled in Paris. In 1858 he was appointed professor of modern languages at the Government College in Meaux. After 1860 he served under Giuseppe Garibaldi, and then in the Italian army until 1867. After his suicide in Florence, his body was brought to Lviv, then in Austria-Hungary (the Russian authorities did not allow for burial in the family tomb in the Evangelical-Augsburg cemetery in Warsaw).

== See also ==
- Battle of Warsaw (1831)
