= Battle of Warsaw (1831) =

Russian victory in the November Uprising

- Part of the November Uprising
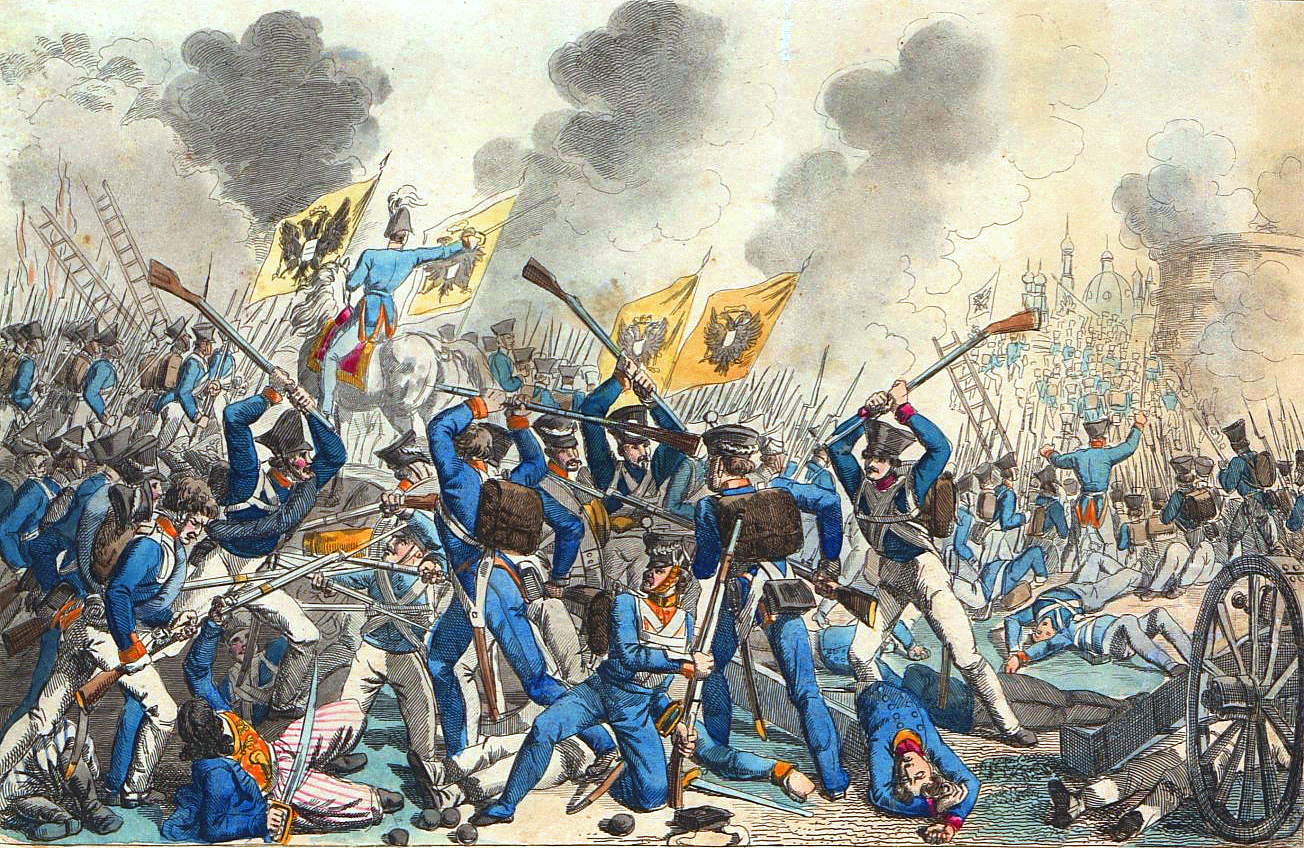
- Russian assault on Warsaw in 1831, George Benedikt Wunder
Date	6–8 September 1831 (Note: 25–27 August 1831 Old Style dates are used by Russian sources published before 1918. Poland has been using the Gregorian calendar since 1582, and Russia adopted it only after the October Revolution of 1917. This article uses Gregorian dates throughout.)
Location	Warsaw, Poland, Russia 52°13′38″N 20°56′35″E
Result	Russian victory
Territorial changes	Paskevich's troops capture Warsaw

Belligerents
Russia	Poland

Commanders and leaders
Ivan Paskevich; Karl von Toll	Jan Krukowiecki (surrendered); Piotr Wysocki (surrendered); Józef Sowiński †

Strength
77,000 to 78,500 (Note: 77,000; 78,000); 390 cannon	34,900 to 42,000 (Note: 37,000; 42,000); 205 cannon

Casualties and losses
9,760–10,600 (Note: 9,760, 10,460; 10,508 killed and wounded; 10,600) killed and wounded or 28,000 including wounded and died of wounds (Polish estimate); 4,000 missing ^{1}	9,000–12,000 (Note: 9,000; more than 9,000 dead; 10,800; 11,000; 12,000) killed, wounded, and captured 16,000 including deserters after the battle 132 guns 5,000 rifles ^{1}

The battle of Warsaw (Polish: Bitwa pod Warszawą, Russian: Варшавская битва), also known as the battle and storming of Warsaw, was fought in September 1831 between Imperial Russia and Poland. After a two-day assault on the city's western fortifications, the Polish defences collapsed and the city was evacuated. It was the largest battle and the final episode of the Polish–Russian War of 1830–31, better known as the November Uprising.

After almost a year of heavy fighting, a large Russian force crossed the Vistula and besieged the capital of Poland on 20 August. Although the siege was partially lifted soon afterwards and a successful sortie allowed a communication route between the city and the rest of Poland, a large Russian force remained on the left bank of the Vistula and continued to threaten the city. Russian commander Ivan Paskevich counted on Polish surrender as his Polish counterpart, Jan Krukowiecki, was known to be a member of the moderate political forces, willing to negotiate with Russian tsar Nicholas I, who had been deposed from the Polish throne in January 1831 by the Sejm (Polish parliament). When a less conciliatory faction gained power in Warsaw and the Russian offer of surrender was refused, Paskevich ordered his forces to launch an assault against Warsaw's western defences.

The assault started on 6 September 1831. Russian forces surprised the Poles by attacking the strongest Polish position in the suburb of Wola. Despite staunch defence of some of the ramparts, especially Fort 54 and Fort 56, after the first day the outer line of Polish defences had been breached by Russian infantry and artillery. In a heroic stand at the Wola redoubt, only 11 Polish defenders remained alive out of a garrison of 3,500. The following day fights resumed, but this time Russian artillery was close enough to shell the western boroughs of the city itself. Although losses were similar on both sides, Polish authorities decided not to risk another Massacre of Praga and ordered the evacuation of the city. On this day, Karl Wilhelm von Toll temporarily replaced Paskevich as commander in chief until he recovered. On 8 September 1831 Warsaw lay in Russian hands, and the remainder of the Polish Army retreated to Modlin. The November Uprising ended soon afterwards, with the remnants of the Polish Army crossing the borders of Prussia and Austria, to avoid being captured by the Russians.

In the 19th century the fight for Warsaw became one of the icons of Polish culture, described by, among others, Polish romantic poets Adam Mickiewicz and Juliusz Słowacki. It was also the main inspiration behind Chopin's Revolutionary Étude, initially called the Étude on the Bombardment of Warsaw. The fall of Warsaw also garnered sympathy for the Poles and their quest for independence.

== Background ==
In 1830 a series of revolutions struck Europe: the July Revolution in France, the Belgian Revolution and smaller revolts in Italy threatened to overthrow the framework of European politics established at the Congress of Vienna. As the Russian tsars were among the strongest advocates of that status quo, the uprising in Poland and the ousting of the tsar as the king of Poland by the Sejm and Senate of Poland on 25 January 1831 were considered a serious irritant. Russia could not send its armies to Belgium or France before the rebellion in Poland was quelled. For that reason the capture of Warsaw was Russia's main target in the war from the start of hostilities.

In the course of the uprising, the army of Russia unsuccessfully tried to capture the capital of Poland on two occasions. First in February 1831, forces under Field Marshal Hans Karl von Diebitsch stormed the eastern suburb of Praga. After a bloody battle at Grochów, the Polish Army successfully retreated to Warsaw, and the capital remained in Polish hands.

Unable to capture Warsaw by a frontal assault, von Diebitsch devised a plan to outflank it and enter the city from the west. In early 1831 he sent his forces upstream on the Vistula, where the Russian divisions were to cross the river and head back north, towards Warsaw. The new plan was thwarted by the Polish defence in three successive battles around Wawer, Dębe Wielkie and Iganie. The Russians withdrew towards Siedlce, where von Diebitsch fell ill and died of cholera. (Note: The so-called second cholera pandemic spread from India to Russia and then to the rest of Europe claiming hundreds of thousands of lives. The same outbreak of cholera killed the famous Prussian generals Carl von Clausewitz and August Neidhardt von Gneisenau stationed in Prussian-controlled Poland at the time.)

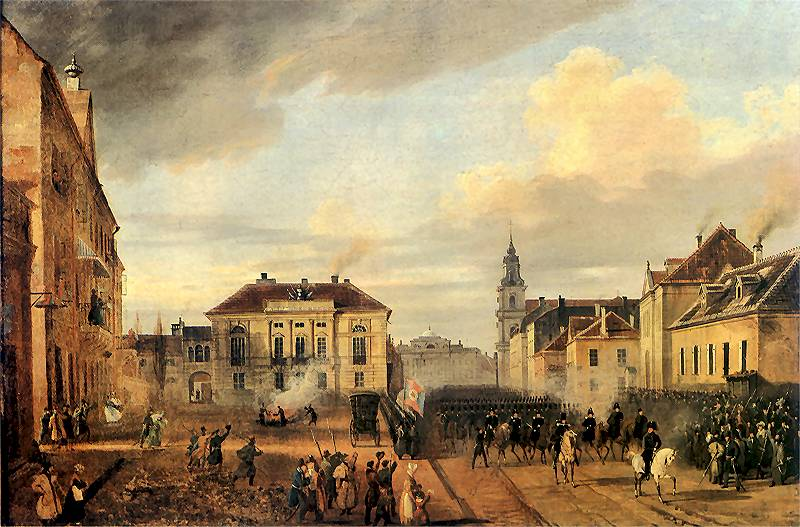
Polish forces returning from Wierzbno, an 1831 painting by Marcin Zaleski

The successor of von Diebitsch as Commander in Chief of Russian forces in Poland, Count Ivan Paskevich, decided to wait for the Polish forces on other fronts to be defeated before he resumed his march on Warsaw. In June 1831 General Antoni Giełgud's attack on Wilno failed, and his corps was forced to cross the border with Prussia to avoid complete destruction. Only a small detachment under General Henryk Dembiński managed to rejoin the main Polish force. This secured Paskevich's northern flank and allowed his forces to devise a new plan of attack. Instead of attacking the city directly and risking yet another defeat, he intended to surround Warsaw, cut it off from other Polish-controlled areas, and force it into submission.

Between 17 and 21 July 1831 he crossed the Vistula near Osiek with his main force, and moved towards Warsaw through Gąbin and Łowicz. Meanwhile, other Russian forces from other theatres were also directed towards the city. General Gregor von Rosen's Corps (12,000 men and 34 guns) marched almost unopposed from Brześć Litewski and reached Praga on 10 August. General Theodor von Rüdiger's corps (12,000 men and 42 guns) crossed the Upper Vistula at Józefów on 7 August and captured Radom.

The new Commander in Chief of the Polish Army, Jan Zygmunt Skrzynecki, was also hesitant to fight a major battle. Instead, he ordered Warsaw to be fortified and allowed the Russians to cross the Vistula unopposed. In his opinion, the war could only be won diplomatically, by interventions of the United Kingdom, Austria and France. Should those fail, Skrzynecki believed Warsaw would hold out at least several weeks under a siege, after which the main bulk of the Polish Army would still be intact to fight a decisive battle against the Russians, who by then would be cut off from their rear by the Vistula. On 10 August 1831 Skrzynecki was forced to resign and was replaced by Henryk Dembiński, the military governor of Warsaw.

== Prelude ==
=== Battlefield ===
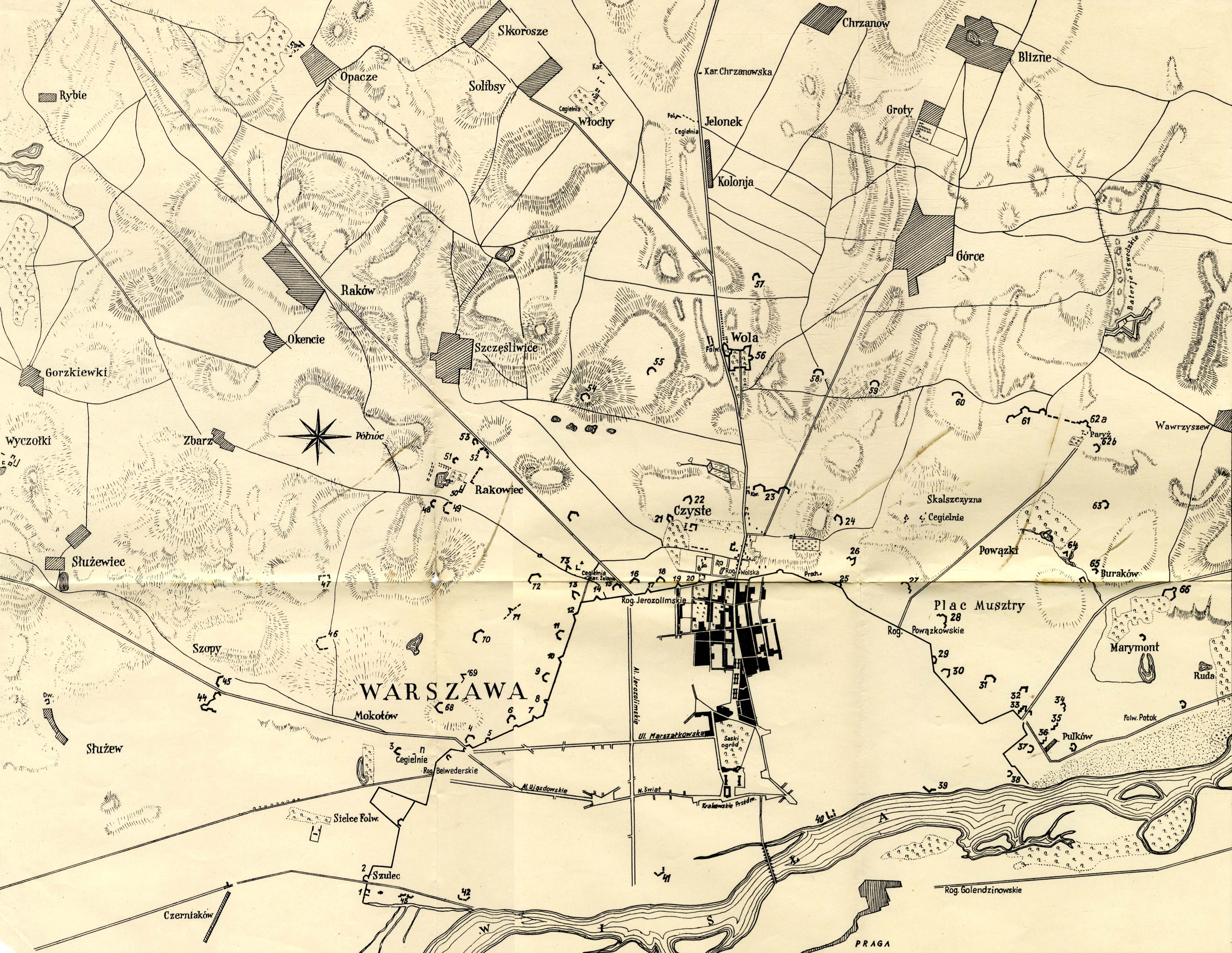
A plan of Polish field fortifications (north is to the right)

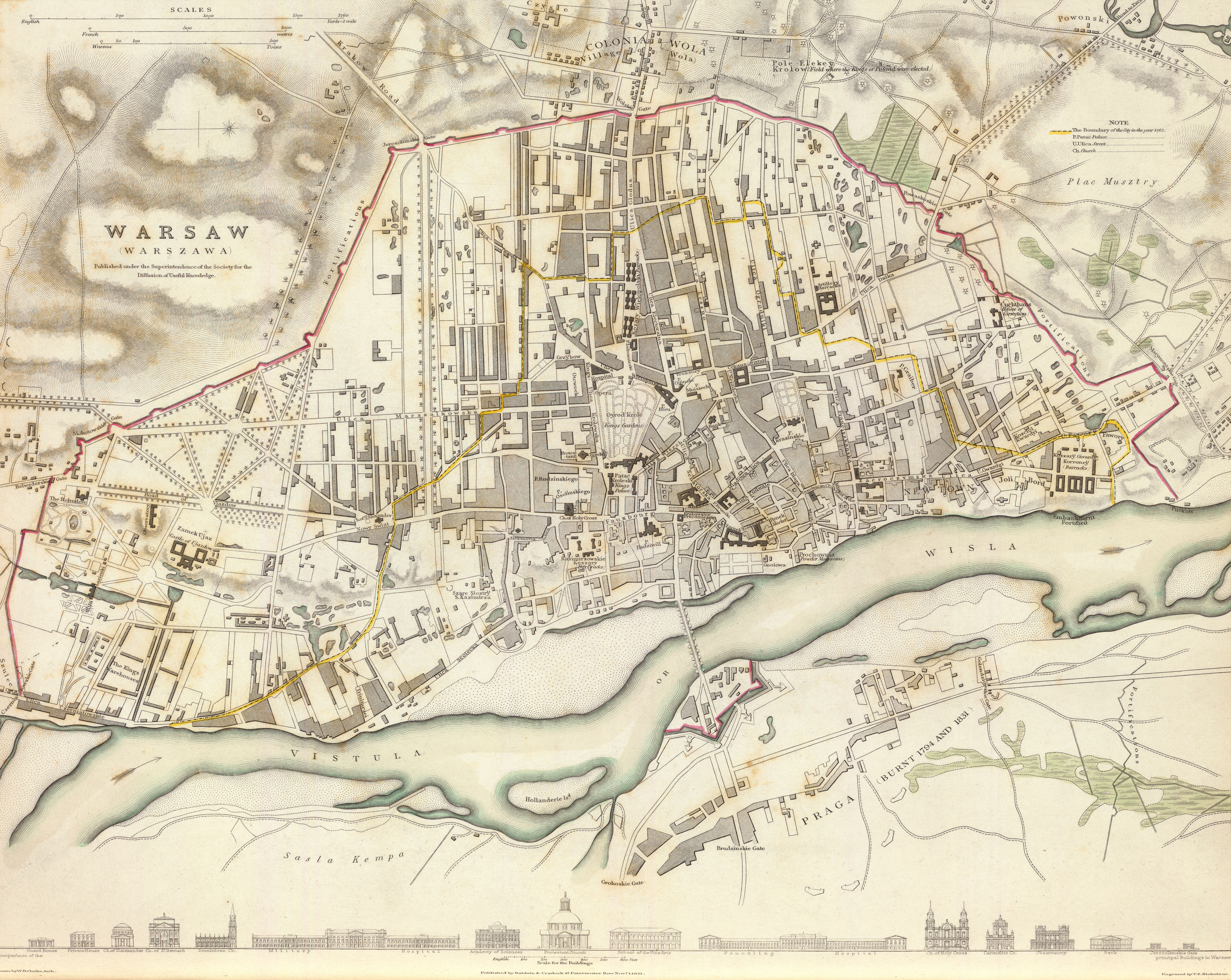
1831 map of Warsaw, with Lubomirski Ramparts marked in red. The main line of Polish defences followed it closely.

In the late 18th century and early 19th century Warsaw grew quickly. As Poland was going through a period of turmoil and constant devastating wars, it lacked modern permanent fortifications. To make up for it, three lines of earthworks, ramparts and palisades were constructed on both sides of the Vistula. The earthworks, usually several metres high and constructed mostly of sand and clay, were reinforced with gabions and surrounded by a dry moat, a stockade and a line of trous de loup.

The inner, third line ran approximately along the former Lubomirski Ramparts, demolished only a couple of years before. It was a continuous line of earthworks 3 metres (9.8 ft) high, strengthened by numerous forts and fortified houses. (Note: Polish fortifications surrounding Warsaw in 1831 are identified in Polish historiography by either their number alone ("Dzieło nr. 56" – "Work No. 56") or by both their number and type, as in "Reduta No. 56", "Luneta No. 71", "Szaniec No. 66", and so on. For the sake of simplicity this article calls all fortifications Forts and refers to their number.)

The second line of defences consisted of forts 400 to 600 metres (1,300 to 2,000 ft) in front of the inner line of defences. The strongest forts were along the road towards Kalisz. (Note: Roughly following the modern Połczyńska and Wolska Streets.)

The first, outer line of defences consisted of smaller forts and ramparts running along a semi-circular line from Szopy, through Rakowiec, Wola and Parysów to the banks of the Vistula. The fortified outposts of the outer line were 1.5 to 3 kilometres (0.93 to 1.86 mi) in front of the third line. Their purpose was to withstand the initial attacks and divide the attacking Russian forces into smaller groups. There were five large groups of earthworks in the outer line:

- Królikarnia (Forts 44 and 45)
- Rakowiec (Forts 48 to 53)
- Wola (Fort 56)
- Parysów (Forts 61 and 62)
- Marymont Forest (Fort 66)

The space between the large fortifications was covered by a series of smaller redans (chevron-shaped forts) and barkans (trapezoidal forts). The strongest fortification in the outer line of defences was Fort 56 in the suburb of Wola, built around the St Lawrence's Church. It was supported by Lunette 57 in front of it, and two forts (54 and 55) to the south of it. The headquarters was in Fort 73 between Rakowiec and the Jerozolimskie Gate.

Polish headquarters decided to man the outer line of defences, the furthest from the densely populated areas. The reason was that in the 1830s 53 per cent of buildings (out of 3,148 houses in Warsaw) were made of wood and a fire could easily destroy the city. In case the enemy broke through all three lines of defences, the city centre was also fortified with 30 barricades, embrasures cut through the walls of several buildings and mines hidden beneath major street crossings.

=== Opposing forces ===
==== Russian Army ====
By 20 August 1831 Warsaw was almost entirely encircled by the Russians. Count Paskevich had at his disposal a formidable force. His main force on the left bank of the Vistula consisted of between 54,000 and 55,000 soldiers, supported by 324 guns of various calibres. A further 7000 soldiers and 20 guns guarded the river crossings. The II Corps under General Cyprian von Kreutz (21,000 soldiers, 90 guns) was heading towards the city from Osiek while von Rüdiger's corps was tied down around Radom, fighting a large Polish corps under General Samuel Różycki.

By 5 September 1831, the main Russian force rose to 78,500 men at arms, including 2,000 sappers, 54,000 infantry, and 17,200 cavalry. Russian artillery outnumbered the Polish and had 382 cannons and 8 mortars operated by 7,300 men. (Note: Other sources mention 362 or even 438 pieces of artillery.) The forces assaulting Warsaw were divided as follows:

- I Infantry Corps (General Peter von der Pahlen) – 11,300 infantry, 424 cavalry, 66 cannon and 4 mortars
  - Cavalry Division (Prince Stepan Khilkov) – 2,700 cavalry, 847 Cossacks, 10 cannon
- II Infantry Corps (General Cyprian Kreutz) – 11,200 infantry, 1110 cavalry, 68 cannon and 4 mortars
  - Cavalry Division (General Georg Nostitz) – 2,100 cavalry, 16 cannon
  - Infantry Division (General Nikolai Muraviev) – 3,100 infantry, 16 cannon
- Corps of Imperial Guard (in reserve, Grand Duke Michael Pavlovich) – 15,700 infantry, 56 cannon
  - Grenadier Corps (General Ivan Shakhovskoy) – 11,000 infantry, 40 cannon
  - Cavalry Corps (General Jan de Witte) – 8,500 cavalry, 40 cannon
  - artillery reserve – 60 cannon
- 2nd Light Division (General Karl Gustav von Strandmann) – 1,400 infantry, 484 cavalry, 875 Cossacks and 6 cannons

The Russian force was superior, but faced severe logistical problems. Count Paskevich's army was too big to sustain on food confiscated from captured lands. It relied on provisions transported from Russia, either directly through Polish territory or theoretically neutral Prussia. The epidemic of cholera brought to Poland and East Prussia by Russian soldiers forced the Prussian authorities to close their borders to Russian transports. To avoid starving his army, Paskevich ordered two permanent bridges built across the Vistula, in Góra and Podgórze. Only the latter one had been completed by the start of the Russian assault of Warsaw.

==== Polish Army ====
The Polish Army in early September 1831 had around 62,000 men. The garrison of Warsaw numbered 31,100 infantry and 3,800 cavalry. It was divided into the following units:

- I Corps (General Jan Nepomucen Umiński) – 18,100 infantry, 1,400 cavalry, 34 guns
- Reserve Corps (General Henryk Dembiński) – 11,500 infantry, 1,700 cavalry, 12 guns
- Garrison of Warsaw and Praga – 1,361 infantry, 524 cavalry

The artillery included 228 pieces of artillery of all types and 21 Congreve rocket batteries, manned by 4554 soldiers of the regular army and 200 members of the National Guard.

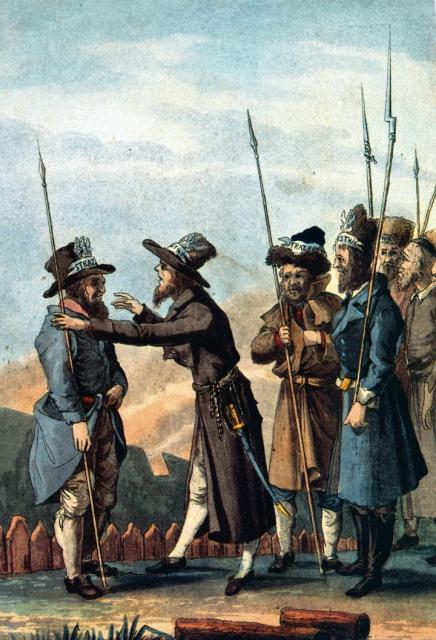
Jewish Security Guard, an 1831 engraving by Fryderyk Krzysztof Dietrich

The crew was insufficient to man all the defences, and some forts had to be abandoned. The Engineering Committee predicted that Warsaw's fortifications would require at least 60,000 troops to be fully manned. There were 15,000 able-bodied members of the Security Guard (Straż Bezpieczeństwa), the National Guard (Gwardia Narodowa) and the Jewish City Guard (Gwardia Miejska Starozakonna) militias willing to join the fight, but the army refused to provide them with arms for fear of losing control over the unruly plebeians.

The city was home to over 175,000 civilians and refugees, and the defenders were low on food supplies. Ammunition supplies were excellent and would "allow the Polish Army to fight not one, but three major battles". The Warsaw Arsenal alone stored 3 million rounds of ammunition and 60,000 cannonballs, 200 shots per cannon.

The cholera epidemic struck Warsaw between 16 May and 20 August; 4,734 people fell ill and 2,524 died. On 15 August a riot broke out in the city, with up to 3,000 civilians and soldiers killing suspected spies and traitors. Between 36 and 60 people were killed. Order was restored, but the situation in the besieged city remained fragile.

==== Training, equipment and morale ====
Both sides were trained in a similar manner and used similar equipment. The standard rifle for both sides was the Model 1808 flintlock musket (a copy of the Charleville musket) and its modification, the Model 1826 Musket, with effective range not exceeding 250 metres (820 ft). Some units of the Polish infantry were still armed with hunting rifles or war scythes, but contrary to common misconception the scythe-wielding kosynierzy were but a small minority of Polish forces. The artillery used by both sides was mostly six-pounder and twelve-pounder licornes; heavier artillery included twenty-pounders ("half-pood") and 10-pounders ("quarter-pood") cannons. Apart from Russian-made artillery, both sides also used to a lesser extent foreign guns. The forces of both sides were a mixture of old, battle-hardened soldiers trained in regular units before the war, and new, unproven recruits.

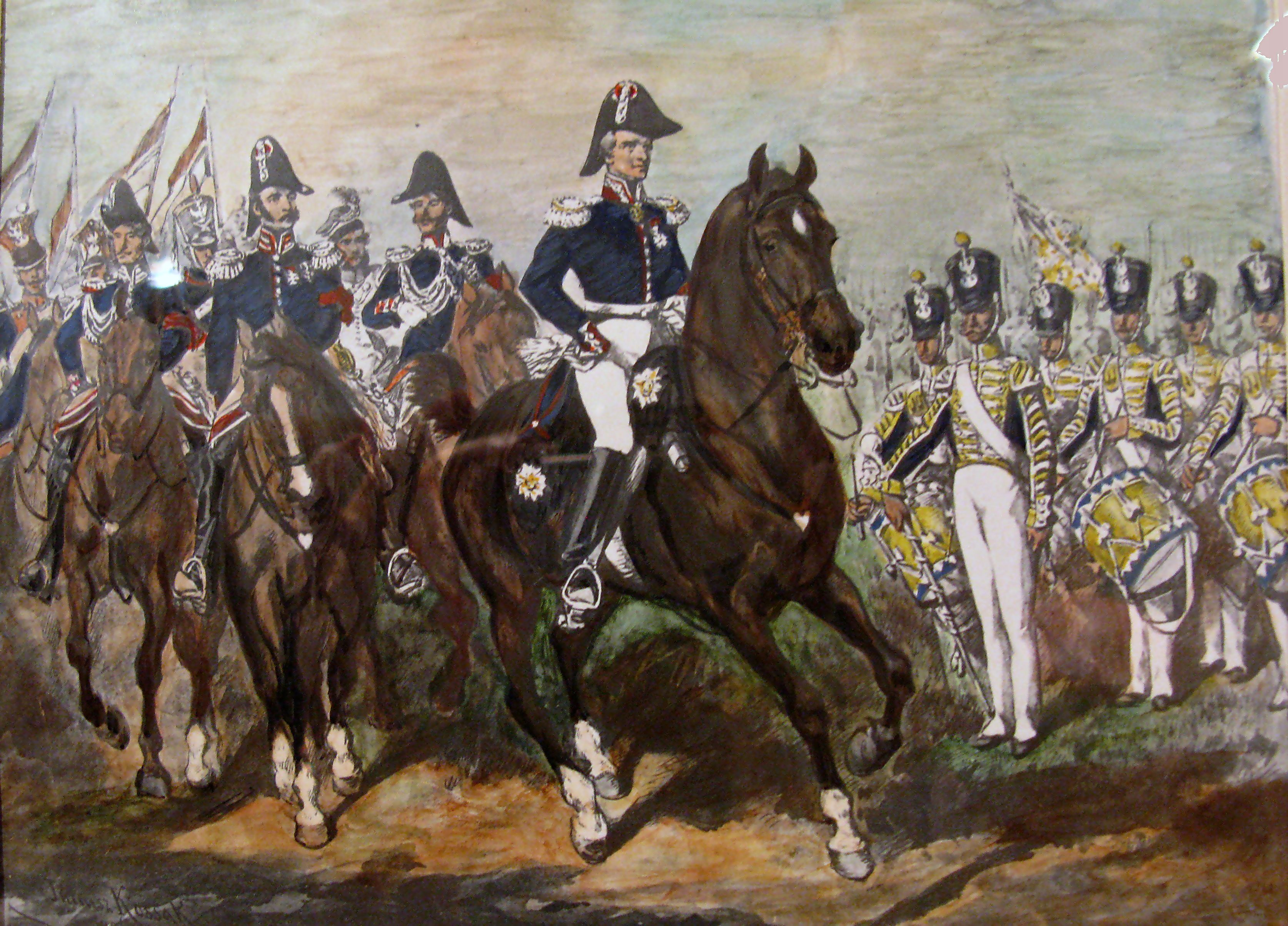
Polish General Staff wore navy blue uniforms reminiscent of Napoleonic-era attire. Soldiers of each regiment wore uniforms in colours of their land.

The Polish Army was made up primarily of volunteers and organised along the lines of Napoleon Bonaparte's army, which meant that there was no corporal punishment in the military handbooks and the soldiers were highly motivated. The good morale of the first months of the uprising was long gone by the early days of September. A long string of defeats, partial victories, and retreats coupled with high command's indecisiveness and frequent changes in command structure (between 12 and 20 August the post of Commander-in-Chief changed hands four times) meant that the soldiers' morale was low. Also, most of the generals in Warsaw lacked faith in the aims of the uprising set by the more liberal-minded members of Sejm and instead were "only doing their job", hoping the status quo would return as soon as the tsar was forced to stand by his promises. The generals supporting continued fighting (Jan Nepomucen Umiński, Henryk Dembiński, Józef Bem, and Kazimierz Małachowski) were in charge in early September, but they were outnumbered by generals who were willing to sign an armistice with the Russians, even against the will of the Sejm.

By contrast the Russian forces' morale was extremely high. The Russian commanders had ample experience in siege operations; Paskevich himself had captured at least six fortified cities in his career, including the capture of Erevan and Abbas-Abbad Fortress in the Russo-Persian War of 1826 and the battle of Akhalzic and siege of Kars during the Russo-Turkish War of 1828.

== Battle ==
=== Initial clashes ===
Facing logistical problems, the new Polish Commander-in-Chief Jan Krukowiecki, who had replaced Dembiński in mid-August, ordered a sortie on the right bank. Like his predecessor, Krukowiecki was a conservative and believed the main aim of the November Uprising was the return of the status quo ante with the tsars of Russia as kings of Poland, but respecting the constitution and Polish laws. Unlike Skrzynecki, he believed foreign intervention to be unrealistic, and wanted to force the Russians to return to peace talks by defeating the Russian forces, breaking the siege or defeating the assault attempts.

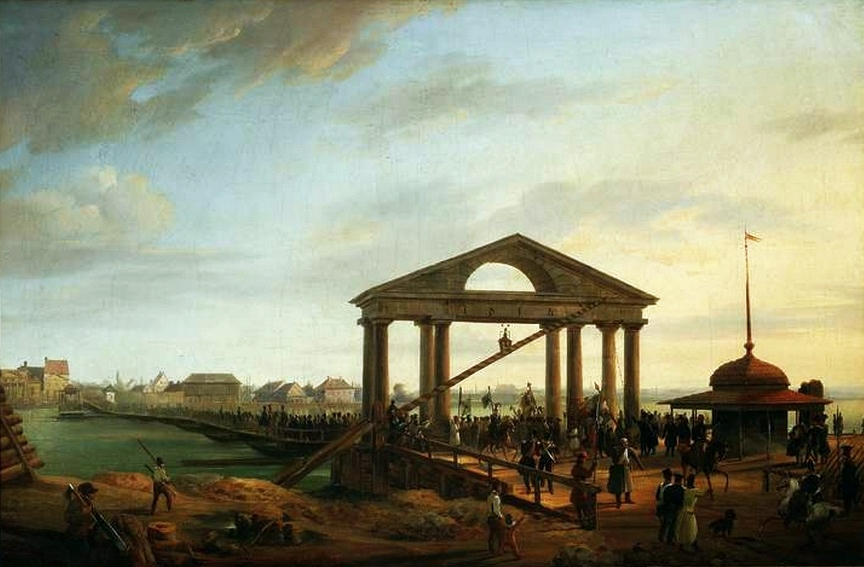
Pontoon bridge over the Vistula on an 1831 painting by Marcin Zaleski

According to the new strategy, the forces under Girolamo Ramorino and Tomasz Łubieński (Note: Ramorino's II Infantry Corps and Łubieński's II Cavalry Corps were detached from the main Polish force in mid-August and included almost half of the entire strength of the Polish Army. They took part in general operations in the last stages of the war, but did not take part in the battle of Warsaw.) were to leave the city and stay on the right bank of the Vistula, harass the Russian forces under von Rosen and von Rüdiger, capture the river crossings at Osiek, provide the city with supplies, and force Paskevich to divert some of his forces to fight them. Both forces left the city between 16 and 20 August 1831. Tomasz Łubieński's Corps headed towards Płock, broke the encirclement, and delivered much-needed supplies to Warsaw. His forces also broke the northern line of communications between Paskevich's forces and East Prussia. Girolamo Ramorino's II Corps in Podlasie defeated von Rosen's Corps in several clashes, including the battles of Międzyrzec and Rogoźnica. Ramorino's indecisiveness and disregard for orders allowed the defeated and numerically inferior Russians to retreat towards Brześć Litewski and avoid complete destruction.

The departure of regular units under Ramorino and Łubieński depleted the forces of the defenders, further weakening the crew manning the first line of defence. The garrison dropped to 28,000 regular soldiers and 10,000 fresh troops, poorly trained and often armed only with scythes.

Having defeated von Rosen at Międzyrzec on 29 August, Ramorino's forces were ordered to return to Siedlce, but Ramorino disregarded that order and followed von Rosen towards Brześć. The order to return through Łuków to Siedlce was repeated on 4 September. From there, a forced march could allow the II Corps to cross the Vistula to the south of Warsaw and attack Paskevich from the rear, or rejoin the bulk of the Polish Army defending Warsaw. The repeated order was also ignored. A large part of the Polish forces, composed mostly of seasoned soldiers, high in morale thanks to recent victories, was wandering aimlessly through Podlasie, only a couple of days' march from Warsaw. Instead of coming to the aid of Warsaw or following the fleeing forces of von Rosen, Ramorino waited in Podlasie for a week, and then headed south, away from the enemy.

On 4 September Paskevich sent an envoy to Warsaw requesting surrender and promising revision of the constitution. Only three out of ten members of the Diplomatic Commission voted in favour of further negotiations, and on 5 September the Russian commander was informed that the only acceptable solution had already been made known in the declaration of the Sejm. The Poles requested that all lands taken by Russia in the partitions of Poland be restored, and that the deposition of Nicholas I as the king of Poland (of 25 January 1831) still be valid.

On the eve of the battle, the Russian Army moved from its positions in villages surrounding Warsaw, (Nadarzyn, Wolica, Falenty, Dawidy and Raszyn) closer to Polish positions. The Guards started moving towards Opacze Wielkie. The grenadiers, Cavalry Corps and the I Infantry Corps moved to the road to Kalisz near Szamoty, and the II Infantry Corps moved to Włochy. An infantry division under Muraviev occupied the fields between Okęcie and Rakowiec, and Cavalry Division of Nostitz moved to Zbarż. To complete the encirclement, the 2nd Light Division under von Strandmann took positions near Służew on the road towards Lublin, while Stepan Khilkov's Cavalry Division moved to Chrzanów. The supply trains and reserves were left in Nadarzyn.

=== Battle plans ===
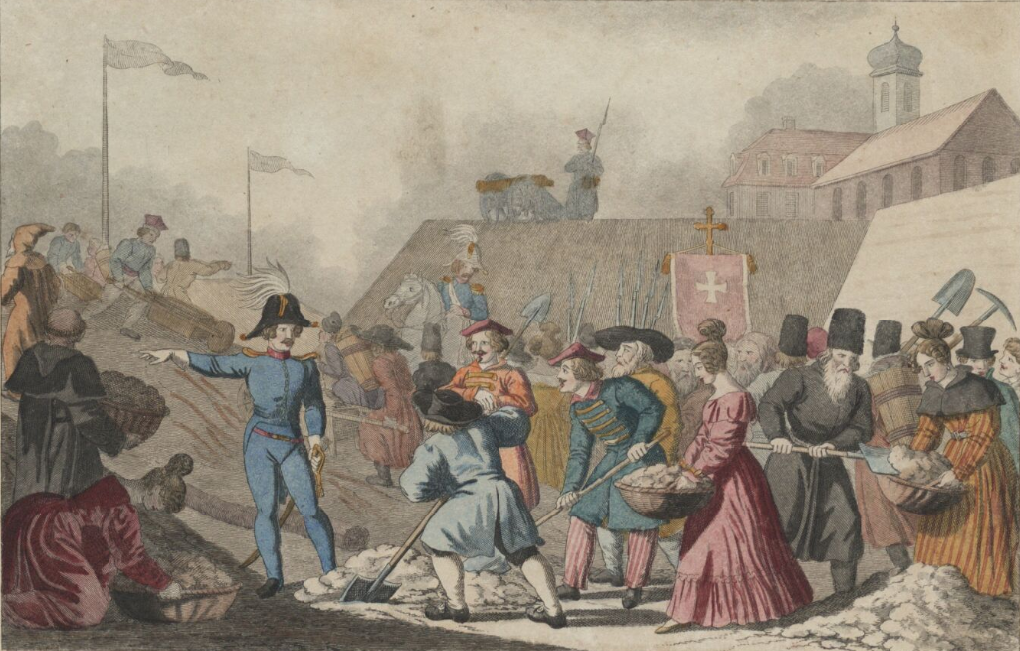
Poles fortify Warsaw, their capital, a 19th-century steel engraving published in Germany

Although initially Paskevich opposed the idea of an all-out assault of the city, the actions of Ramorino and Łubieński forced his hand. His force was low on provisions and supplies: by early September the main Russian force had only 5 days' worth of food and horse fodder. On 28 August Paskevich accepted some of his generals' advice, and ordered preparations for a general attack. After several days of quarrels within the Russian staff, it was decided on 4 September that the main thrust should be aimed at the strongest Polish positions behind the suburb of Wola. The assault was to focus on the central rampart in Wola, Fort 56, and the surrounding fortifications. The Russian I Infantry Corps was to storm Fort 57 and continue towards Forts 56 and 58. The II Infantry Corps was to focus on nearby Forts 54 and 55. Other sectors of the front were to be only lightly pressed by diversionary attacks. Paskevich probably did not want to enter Warsaw and counted on the Polish defenders to abandon the city or surrender once the outer ring of defences was pierced and the city centre was threatened with fire.

The Polish plan was based on fixed defence of the front line, with the forces under Umiński and Dembiński behind the second line of defences and acting as a mobile reserve, together with divisional artillery and cavalry. Umiński's Corps was to cover the southern sector of the front, a line of approximately 7.1 kilometres (4.4 mi) from the road to Puławy, through the road towards Kraków, to the line connecting Fort 18 and Fort 74. Forces under Dembiński were to defend the western and northern sector, along a line of 9.6 kilometres (6.0 mi) running from Redoubt 54 to the suburb of Marymont. Most of the Polish forces were in the southern part of the city, as the Polish headquarters incorrectly assumed that the Russians would attack the weakest part of the defences, around Królikarnia, the suburbs of Mokotów and Czerniaków.

=== 6 September ===
Already before the battle Paskevich achieved devastating numerical superiority on the western front. The first Russian line facing Wola had 30,200 soldiers, 144 pieces of artillery and eight mortars; the second line was formed by 39,200 soldiers and 196 pieces of artillery. Facing them were 5,300 infantry, 65 cannons and 1,100 cavalry under Dembiński, with another 4,800 soldiers in reserve.

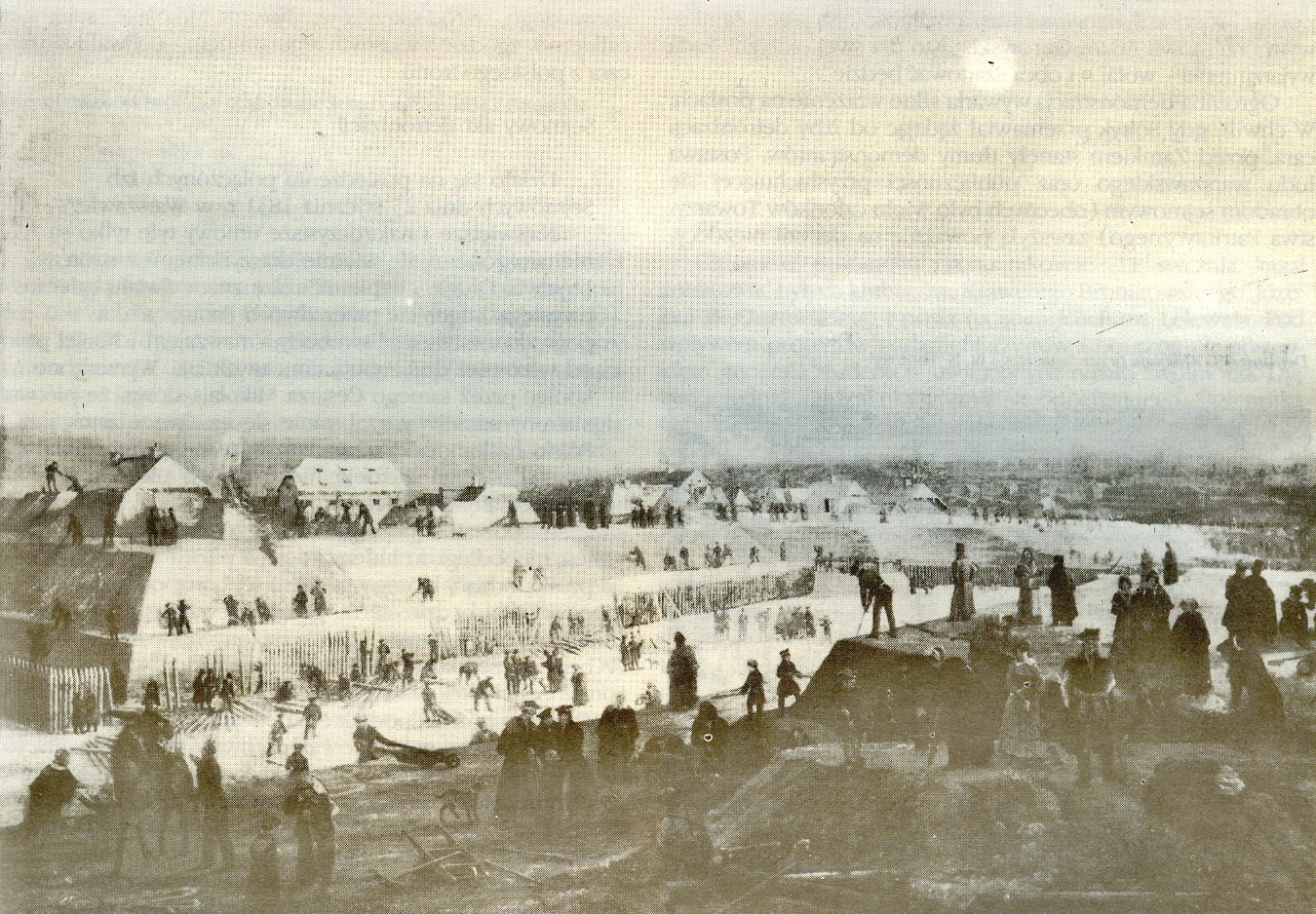
The ramparts of Warsaw were over 3 metres (9.8 ft) high and were reinforced with stockades, dry moats, spike pits and other obstacles. Houses near the forts were also fortified.

At 2:00 Polish observation posts on the Holy Trinity Church and the Astronomical Observatory at Ujazdów Avenue spotted enemy movements and sounded the alarm. The attack started around 4:00, and within an hour Polish forts 54 and 57 opened fire on approaching Russians. Around 5:00, eighty-six guns of the I Infantry Corps started shelling Polish positions around Wola from a distance of 600 metres (2,000 ft), and the battle started.

Fort 56 consisted of three wings, each surrounded by its own earthwork, stockades and a moat. Partially obscured by the trees of Brühl's Garden, the central wing was further reinforced by the St. Laurence's Church and the surrounding monastery. The fort, commanded by General Józef Sowiński, was manned by two battalions of the 8th Regiment of Line Infantry (1,200 men), with 40 sappers, 13 cannon, two Congreve rocket launchers, and a small detachment from the 14th Regiment of Line Infantry (170 men). Directly in front of it, on a hill overlooking the battlefield, lay the smaller, irregularly-shaped Fort 57 manned by 300 men under Maj. Józef Krassowski, armed with four pieces of artillery and two Congreve rocket launchers. To the north lay Fort 59 (four cannon and 400 men under Maj. Józef Borzęcki), while to the south Fort 54 (up to 350 men under Maj. Ignacy Dobrzelewski and six guns under Lt. Julian Konstanty Ordon). Even though the remaining forts of Wola (Forts 55, 58, 60 and 61) were deprived of their garrisons to strengthen the defence, the most important Polish positions were still severely undermanned.

Further to the south, near Rakowiec, lay a group of forts of the outer line. All had already been abandoned by the Poles in early September and were captured by Russian infantry under General Muraviev without a fight. Forces under General von Strandmann captured Szopy and started attacking Forts 44, 45 and the fortifications around Królikarnia. Although von Strandmann's unit did not have a clear numerical superiority (2,900 Russians with six guns against 1,700 Poles with six guns), they quickly pushed back the Polish defenders. Soon dense black powder smoke covered the battlefield. Unable to determine the direction of Russian attacks, the Polish commanders believed that the aim of the main thrust would be delivered against the positions at Królikarnia.

The first to realise the mistake was General Dembiński, the commanding officer of the Reserve Corps tasked with defending the western sector. He immediately asked for reinforcements but was denied by General Krukowiecki. Forced to fight alone, Dembiński did not reinforce the first line with his reserve 3rd Infantry Division and instead sent forward only a token force: half a battalion to man Fort 58 and support Fort 57. To make things worse for the Poles, General Umiński, the commanding officer of the southern sector, focused entirely on the skirmishes around Królikarnia and did not notice what was happening in Wola. Around 7:00 he reinforced Królikarnia with almost six battalions of infantry (ca. 2,800 men) and three guns. Forts 54 and 55 received no reinforcements.

==== Fort 54 ====
Meanwhile, the outer earthworks protecting the forts around Wola were being destroyed by Russian artillery. From 6:00, 108 pieces of Russian artillery were focused on forts 54, 55 and 57. Fort 54 held out and losses among the infantry were low, but the artillery of the isolated outposts was forced to hide behind the ramparts. Forts 59 and 61 could not support their neighbours as their crews fought their own artillery duel with horse artillery of Khilkov's Cavalry Division, which suffered heavy casualties.

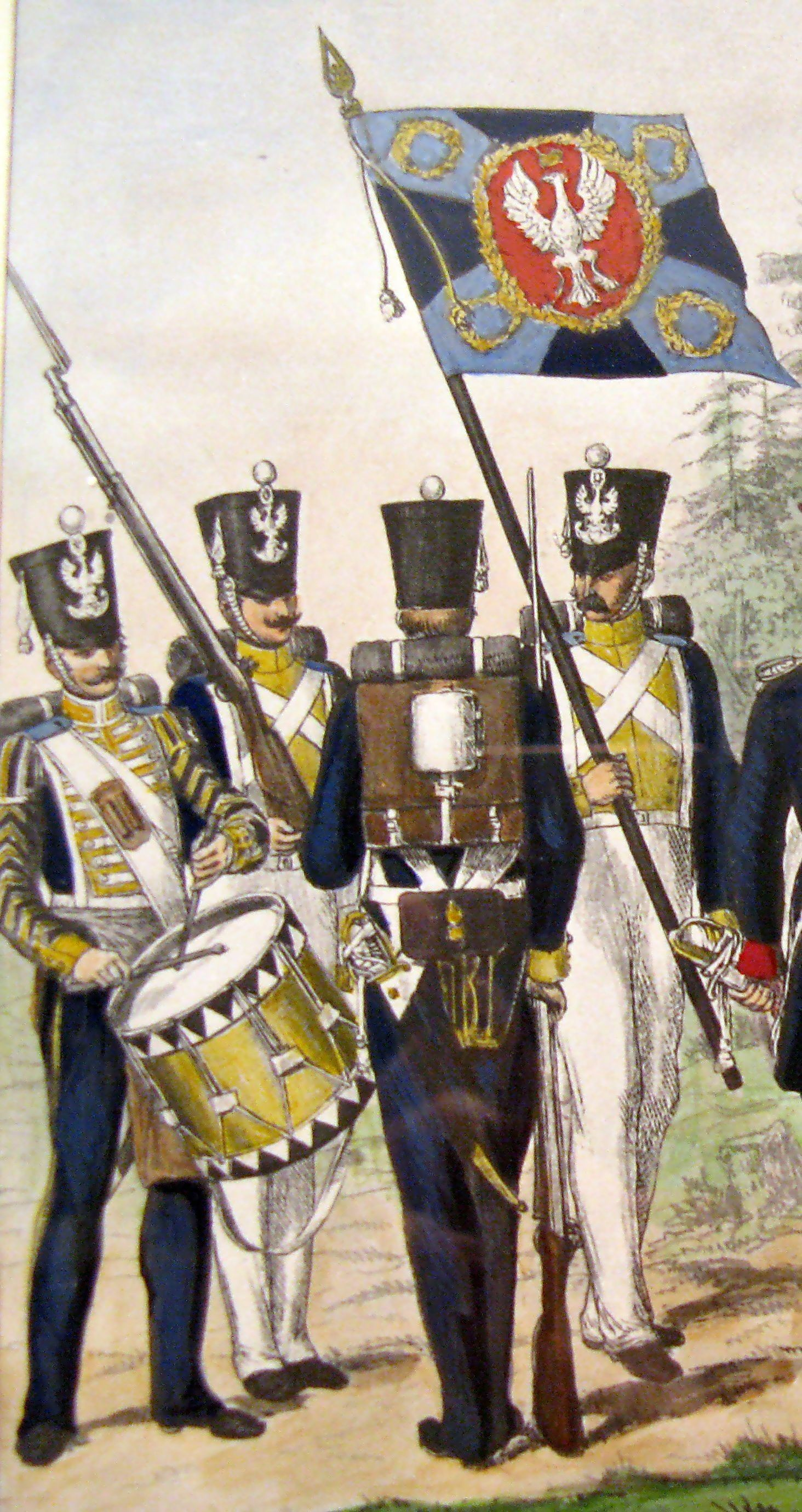
Soldiers of Polish regiments formed before the outbreak of hostilities (1st through 8th Regiments of Line Infantry) wore navy blue uniforms with white trousers and yellow collars and details.

Out of 32 pieces of artillery held in reserve by Dembiński, only four were moved forward to Fort 58. Around 6:30, nine more guns joined the artillery duel around Wola, but their support was too weak and came too late. At that time two large assault columns were formed by Russian II Infantry Corps. The first, under General Nikolai Sulima, advanced on Fort 54 with Lutkovski's Brigade (2,500 men) in the first line. The second, commanded by General Friedrich Caspar von Geismar, headed for Fort 55. As soon as von Geismar realised that the redoubt was empty, he ordered 1,500 men under Col. Pavel Liprandi to join the attack on Fort 54 instead. Despite serious losses, three battalions of Lutkovski's Brigade reached the stockade surrounding the earthworks and started clearing obstacles.

Because of the smoke the commanders of the second line of Polish outposts could not see the approaching Russians and did not open fire. Contrary to the battle plan, the second line did not send reinforcements to the first. This was particularly important in the case of Forts 54 and 56, as they had to face the enemy alone, without the support of Forts 21, 22 and 23 behind them. The most important positions in the suburb of Wola received only token reinforcements from the main reserve and were forced to fight in isolation.

The Polish defenders of Fort 54 fired incessantly, but by then the Russian horse artillery had a clear line of sight onto the top of the rampart. For unknown reasons the Poles did not use the grenades prepared for defence in close quarters. When the breach was completed, two Russian regiments (13th 'Belozerskiy' and 14th 'Olonetskiy') charged into the gap. Other Russian soldiers stormed the earthwork itself, using bayonets as steps to climb onto the parapet. After several salvoes, (Note: Among the fallen Russians was Col. Alexander Tukhachevsky, commander of the 14th Regiment and grandfather to Soviet World War II commander Mikhail Tukhachevsky.) Polish infantry retreated to within the fort, to fire at Russian soldiers appearing on top of the rampart. The first to cross the obstacles was Pavel Liprandi with his men. With 10:1 Russian superiority, the bayonet fight was short, and between 60 and 80 surviving Poles were taken prisoner in a matter of minutes. Soon afterwards the gunpowder magazine was set on fire and exploded, killing over 100 Russians, among them the commanding officer of the 13th Regiment, Col. Ivan Khludenev. The explosion was fictionalised and immortalised in Adam Mickiewicz's poem Reduta Ordona (Ordon's Redoubt). Altogether the Russian losses during the storming of Fort 54 were between 500 and 600 killed. The dead were buried in a mass grave in a shell-hole, which later became the nucleus of the Orthodox Cemetery in Warsaw.

Expecting a Polish counter-attack, Russian engineers started to repair Forts 54 and 55. Initially only Polish artillery from forts 73, 21, 22 and 23 responded with fire, while Dembiński's reserves remained passive. Seeing no activity on Polish side, Russian II Infantry Corps' artillery started supporting its neighbours of the I Infantry Corps. Russian artillery suffered some losses, but its superiority was evident. Batteries of the I Corps approached Fort 57 to within 300 metres (980 ft), which forced the Polish artillery to be dismantled and withdrawn from the fort. Around 8:00 two columns of the I Corps (under Alexander von Lüders and Ivan Nabokov) assaulted the fort. Elements of four Russian regiments (3rd and 4th Marine Regiments, 7th 'Revelski' Infantry Regiment and Moskovsky Regiment) stormed the fort from three sides, hoping a three-hour artillery barrage had destroyed the obstacles and palisade guarding the entry to Polish positions. The stockade was almost intact and Russian forces suffered considerable losses, both from small-arms fire and from artillery of the second line. The officers ordered a retreat, but the soldiers disregarded the order and continued to assault the fort on their own. Several assaults were repelled with heavy Russian losses. Despite the losses, Russian infantry entered the fort and captured it in a close quarters fight, without a shot fired. Only about 80 Poles were taken captive, and four managed to retreat to the Polish lines with their wounded commanding officer; the remainder fought on and were killed almost to the last man. As the recently captured fort was well within the range of Polish artillery, the Russians withdrew and started hiding behind it.

==== Fort 56 ====
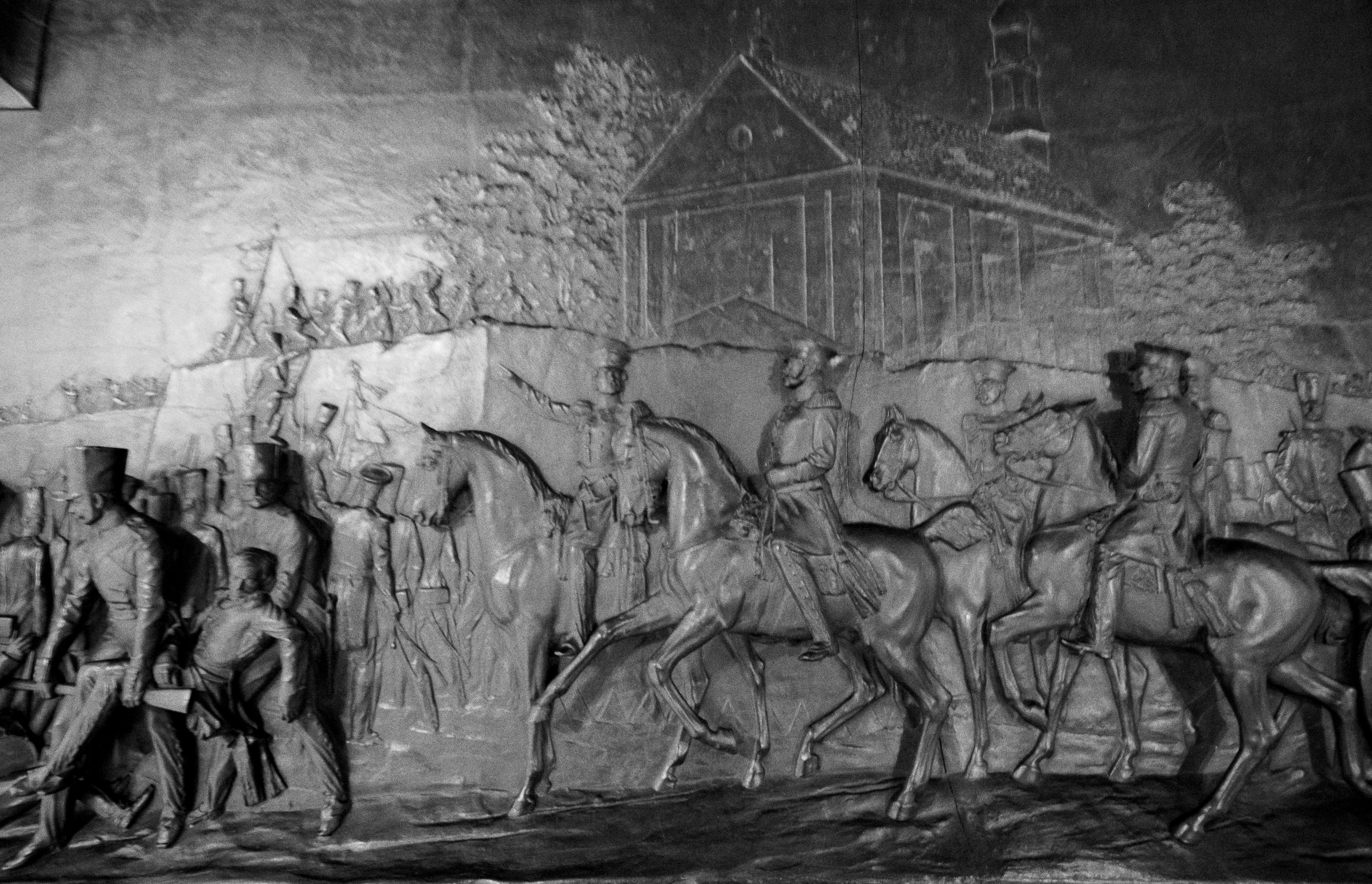
Paskevich commanding the forces to attack Redoubt 56, a bas-relief scene from Warsaw's monument to Paskevich

Despite the loss of forts 54, 55 and 57, Krukowiecki was still convinced that the attack on Wola was a diversion, and refused to grant General Dembiński more reinforcements. Only General Ludwik Bogusławski, commanding officer of the 3rd Infantry Division, disregarded his orders and sent a single battalion of the 10th Line Infantry Regiment to Fort 56 as reinforcements. The battalion was led by Col. Piotr Wysocki, the officer who started the entire November Uprising. Dembiński abandoned Fort 58. Its artillery, along with 12 cannons and six rocket launchers from his reserves, was ordered to take positions between the first and second lines of defence, in front of Forts 21, 22 and 23. Around 9:00, when Russian forces were preparing to push further into the second line of Polish defences, Brigadier Józef Bem arrived to Wola with his 12 cannon and positioned them not far from the recently lost Fort 54, right on the flank of Kreutz's infantry and Russian artillery shelling Fort 56. Eight more guns and four rocket launchers arrived to the northern flank of Wola and joined the defence of Fort 58. Around that time the combined artillery forces of both Russian infantry corps shifted their fire to Forts 56, 59 and 23. This time the Poles won the artillery duel. Despite Russian numerical superiority in guns and mortars, the Russian artillery suffered losses and was forced to withdraw, followed by infantry, likewise forced back into hiding behind the captured earthworks. Dembiński did not take advantage of this success, and the Polish infantry remained hidden behind fixed defences.

Seeing no activity, the commander of the Russian II Corps ordered all his cannons to shift fire onto the 14 guns under Józef Bem. Heavily pressed, Polish artillery withstood the fire for over half an hour before switching to new positions to the right of the road to Kalisz. It resumed fire on the II Corps, but was again targeted by enemy guns. The artillery duel continued, but the situation of Fort 56 was becoming critical. Shelled from three sides, the largest Polish fort around Warsaw was now isolated. Including reinforcements brought by Col. Wysocki, the crew of the fort included approximately 1,660 infantrymen and ten pieces of artillery. By 10:00 most artillerymen had been killed or wounded (including the fort's artillery commander, Capt. Krzywicki) and had to be replaced with untrained infantrymen, which seriously limited the Polish guns' rate of fire and accuracy. All ramparts were successively damaged by Russian artillery, and there was a 30-metre breach in one of its sides.

Paskevich, who observed the artillery duel from Fort 55, became convinced that his Polish counterpart would not come to the rescue of Fort 56. Initially hesitant, he finally ordered Russian infantry to attack Fort 56 around 10:00. The attack was carried out by 13 infantry battalions (ca. 6,900 men) from columns commanded by General Lüders and Martinov. The forces of Lüders stormed the obstacles and crossed the stockade, but Polish defenders met them with rifle volleys from within the fort, and the attack was repelled. Lüders quickly ordered his second line (2,300 men) to advance as well. The new forces were twice pushed back into the moat by the commander of the northern wing, Maj. Franciszek Biernacki, but in the end the Polish defenders were overpowered and had to withdraw further into the fort. The Russians followed, but their battalions lost cohesion, which allowed the numerically inferior force under Biernacki to hold out inside the fort and cover the flank of the central wing.

Forces under General Martinov assaulted the central wing of Fort 56. Here the obstacles were intact, and 200 Polish soldiers repelled three consecutive assaults by a famed Moscow Guards Regiment. The Russians lost two regimental commanders before their forces managed to reach the moat. When a force of 2,900 Russians reached the top of the rampart, they were surprised by a staunch defence of a second rampart behind it. Russian infantry retreated and hid under the first rampart. Biernacki, fighting in the northern wing, managed to expel the Russian infantry, but was killed in action during the counter-attack, and the Poles withdrew back into the trees on the far side of the fort. To stabilise the situation, General Sowiński ordered a company of the 8th Line Infantry Regiment to leave the central wing and join the fight in the north. The new commanding officer of the north wing, Maj. Lipski, organised yet another counter-attack. Shouting "Mates, remember Grochów, remember Iganie!" he led his men in a charge and pushed the Russians back once again, but the impetus was lost and the Russians retained control of the rampart to the north-west. A short stalemate ensued, in which the Polish infantrymen and their single twelve-pounder carronade prevented much larger enemy forces from entering the fort.

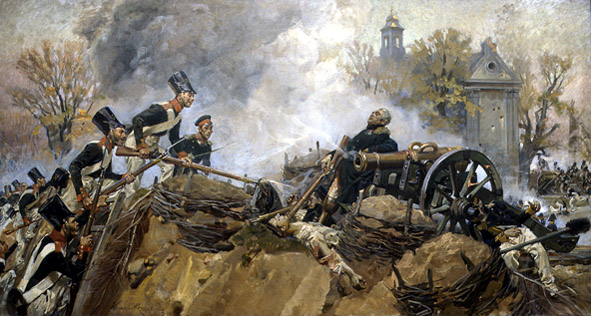
Sowiński on the Ramparts of Wola, a painting by Wojciech Kossak

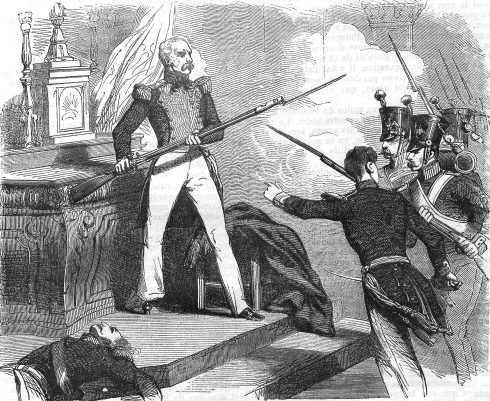
"Death of General Sowiński", a contemporary engraving by Gustave Janet-Lange

Seeing that their forces had failed, Paskevich and Pahlen decided to throw in even more forces into the fight. Elements of the 9th 'Ingermanland' Infantry Regiment and 10th 'New Ingermanland' Infantry Regiment (890 men and six guns) were ordered to attack the eastern side of the northern wing. Simultaneously seven battalions (ca. 4,000 men) were to attack the central and eastern wings from the south. About 70 pieces of artillery were ordered to fire on the second line of Polish defences to prevent Polish reinforcements from breaking through to the fort. This time several thousand Russians entered the northern wing in strict military formations. By then the garrison under Maj. Lipski had 800 men and was not strong enough to withstand the assault. Poles were again pushed back into the trees of the far side of the northern wing, and Maj. Lipski was killed. He was replaced by Maj. Dobrogoyski, who panicked and sounded a retreat, taking with him 500 men. The remaining 300 soldiers under Maj. Świtkowski tried again to force the Russians out but were by then outnumbered 10 to 1 and around 10:30 had to withdraw towards the central wing. The central wing, by then under the command of Lt. Col. Wodzyński, held out against a large column led by General Lüders, composed of the elite regiments of Prince Wilhelm and Prince Charles.

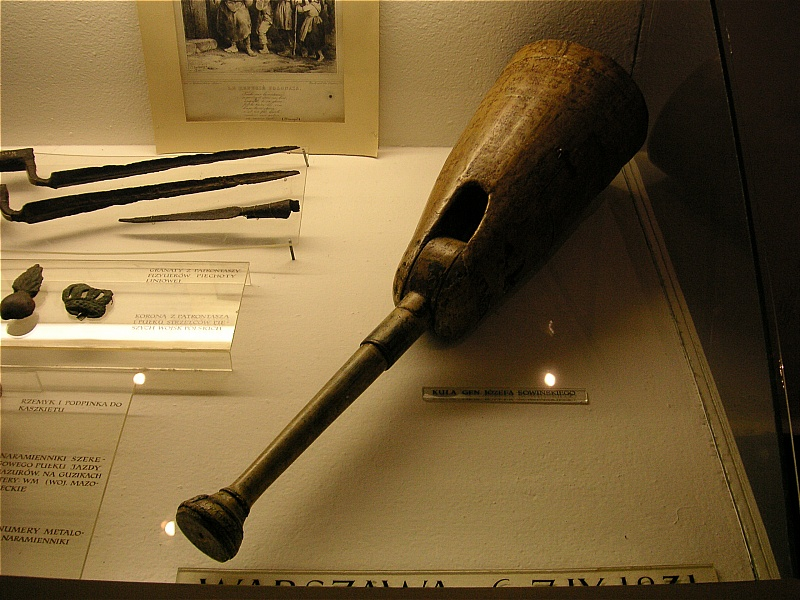
General Sowiński's pegleg is preserved in the Museum of the Polish Army.

By that time the central wing was defended by a mere 900 men and one cannon. The combined forces of Lüders, Martynov and Friedrich von Berg exceeded 6,000 men and were preparing to storm it. Several assaults were repelled, but shortly after 11:00 the Polish position was attacked from the north and south simultaneously. The northern pincer stalled and the southern pincer, led by General Malinovski, was bloodily repelled. General Martynov was badly wounded. General Pahlen ordered a further 2,300 men (5th Infantry Regiment and elements of Siberian Grenadiers) to attack from the other side. The Siberian regiment entered the fort and forced the crews of carronades, commanded personally by General Sowiński, to withdraw within the walls surrounding the church. The largest group of Polish soldiers fighting in front of the church was offered capitulation, and Sowiński and the remainder of his crew laid down their arms. Another group of Polish soldiers still defending the church fired at the Russians, and angered Russian soldiers, General Sowiński among them, massacred the prisoners of war. As Russian authorities later confirmed he died on the field of duty, Sowiński soon became a Polish national hero, immortalised in a poem "Sowiński w okopach Woli" (Sowiński in the trenches of Wola) by Juliusz Słowacki.

The surrounded church was well prepared for defence, but its garrison was by then composed almost entirely of the wounded. By noon the defenders were overpowered, and the Russians entered the church. The fight for Fort 56 was over. Altogether the Russian side lost no less than 1,000 killed in action during the storming of the fort. Polish casualties did not exceed 300 killed and wounded, with 1,230 soldiers and officers taken prisoner. Only up to 500 soldiers managed to withdraw and reach Polish lines.

==== Fights for Wola and elsewhere ====
During the fights for the ramparts of Wola, only artillery of the second line gave limited support to the outnumbered Polish troops. Krukowiecki claimed after the war that he ordered Dembiński, Bem and General Franciszek Młokosiewicz to support the first line, but apparently none of them received the order. General Ludwik Bogusławski, commander of the 3rd Infantry Division manning the second line, could have supported the forts of the first line, but he could not see what was happening in Fort 56 due to dense smoke and the trees of Brühl's Garden.

Paskevich expected a Polish counter-attack aimed at recapturing the lost forts, so he ordered his troops to halt the advance, rebuild the ramparts and construct new artillery emplacements facing the city. Further movement in the vicinity of Wola was blocked by Polish artillery from Fort 59, but within two hours Russian sappers prepared Fort 56 to serve as an artillery outpost for up to 20 pieces of artillery. Paskevich also sent tirailleurs and rifle-armed skirmishers forward to probe and harass Polish defences around Fort 23. Polish field artillery left Fort 21 and pushed back the Russian light infantry, but were then attacked by Russian I Corps' artillery and forced to flee. Only then did General Bogusławski realise that Fort 56 might need assistance. To reconnoitre enemy movements and possibly deliver munitions to the fort he dispatched General Młokosiewicz with his infantry brigade of 1,000 men. Two Russian rifle regiments fled before his columns and Młokosiewicz's men almost reached the fort, but Russian artillery opened fire and inflicted several dozen casualties on the Poles. Młokosiewicz realised that Fort 56 was lost and quickly retreated towards Forts 21 and 22. Two Russian rifle regiments (1st and 2nd) tried to pursue, but were defeated by Polish artillery and retreated.

Unexpectedly, this weak push by Młokosiewicz and his men probably forced the Russians to reconsider their plans and postpone any further attacks until the following day. At that moment Paskevich was not sure what the Poles would do. He feared a Polish counter-attack would retake the forts of Wola, or strike a wedge between his I and II Corps. He ordered all offensive actions in Wola halted. His artillery continued to duel with the Poles, but infantry was withdrawn and Paskevich himself left his forces to look for the Corps of General Muraviev to the south, somewhere between Szczęśliwice and the Jerozolimskie Gate.

Around that time General Małachowski arrived at Fort 23 to inspect the part of the front he had neglected until that point. Informed by General Młokosiewicz of the loss of Fort 56, he ordered a counter-attack. More preoccupied with holding the second line than with retaking the first, he committed only two battalions (1,240 men) out of 12 he had in reserve to the assault. The counter-attack started around 13:00 and was supported by a token force of 14 pieces of horse artillery, while General Bem held 21 heavier field cannons in reserve. As soon as the Poles left their ramparts, the sortie came under fire of Russian artillery amassed in front of forts 54, 55 and 56. Despite heavy fire, the Poles reached a point 500 metres (1,600 ft) south-east of Fort 56, where they were met by elements of two Russian rifle regiments (1st and 2nd; ca. 1,800 men). Despite Russian numerical superiority, the Polish force broke through and pushed the Russians back, but was then defeated by Russian artillery on the eastern rampart of Fort 56. When Russian reinforcements appeared on both his flanks, the Polish commander sounded the retreat and returned to the Polish lines. The Polish counter-attack failed. To make the situation even more serious, the retreating Poles were followed closely by a large Russian force of the two rifle regiments, reinforced with elements of 1st, 2nd and 5th Infantry Divisions.

The Russians assaulted the second Polish line and pierced it in numerous places. The position of Russian infantry was very difficult because it overtook the 14 Polish guns sent forward by General Bem to support the Polish counter-attack, which meant that it was under artillery fire from the front, the sides and the rear. Eventually a counter-attack by the 4th Line Infantry Regiment under Lt. Col. Kazimierz Majewski repelled the Russians storming the Polish lines. Several smaller Russian units broke through and tried to fortify a group of wooden houses in the suburb of Wola, but were quickly surrounded and killed. At that point, around 13:00, Małachowski wanted to organise yet another counter-attack aimed at Fort 56, but his orders were overridden by Krukowiecki, who feared that the Russians might want to attack further south, near Jerozolimskie Gate, and preferred to keep his reserves intact. The Polish side ceased all offensive actions on the western front, and only the artillery remained active.

==== Artillery duel continues ====
Between 13:00 and 14:00 General Bem amassed at least 64 artillery pieces on a narrow front near Forts 21, 22 and 23, and started firing on the artillery and infantry of the I Russian Corps. In the artillery barrage that lasted until 17:00, the forces of Russian I and II Corps were eventually forced to withdraw behind the ramparts of the captured forts. On several occasions the Russian cavalry of General Khilkov (including the Cuirassier Regiment) tried to charge the Polish artillery positions, but every time the charge was bloodily repelled with grapeshot and canister shot. Eventually the Russian cavalry withdrew from battle all the way to Górce. Half of the Russian artillery fought an intense artillery duel with the Poles, while the other half started shelling the suburb of Wola and Polish positions behind the second line of defences. Although the barrage prepared the field for yet another Polish counter-attack, Krukowiecki would not risk it.

Paskevich held a war council with his generals. Karl Wilhelm von Toll and many other generals insisted that the assault on Wola be resumed, but Paskevich was sceptical. The Russians still had 25,000 fresh troops, but the dusk was nearing, and Paskevich feared that after dark his forces might lose cohesion and suffer excessive losses. The Russian commander also thought that an attack on Wola might be hampered by positions of the first line still held by the Poles (Forts 58, 59 and 60; in reality Fort 58 had been abandoned), or by a Polish counter-attack from the area of Czyste. He decided to postpone offensive actions until the following day. Paskevich also sent another envoy to Warsaw, but the hastily called session of the Sejm renounced his offer of a cease-fire.

By that point the battle plan of the Russians was still not clear to the Polish Commander-in-Chief General Krukowiecki. Unsure whether the main attack was on Wola or the forts around Królikarnia, he did not reassign any sizable infantry force to the western front, despite the fact that the southern line was safely in Polish hands and repeated Russian attacks there were being repelled one by one. Out of 3,000 casualties suffered by the Polish side on the first day only approximately 300 were in the southern sector near Królikarnia, including at most "several dozen killed". Yet only a small detachment of horse artillery was dispatched to the second line near Wola. In the evening General Krukowiecki called a meeting of the government and described the situation of his forces as extremely difficult. He suggested that talks with Paskevich be resumed and sent General Prądzyński to Paskevich's camp.

=== 7 September ===
==== First round of negotiations ====
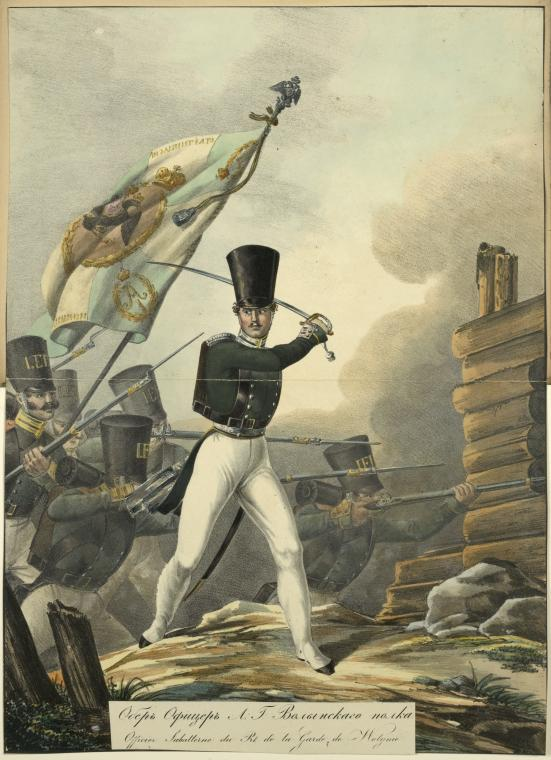
Officer and soldiers of the Russian Volhynian Guard Regiment

The two met at the outskirts of Wola in the early hours of 7 September. (Note: Some sources mention that the meeting took place at 3:00, others mention 5:00.) Paskevich proclaimed a cease-fire and invited Krukowiecki to meet him at 9:00. The meeting was held in the village tavern of Wola. Paskevich demanded that Warsaw and Praga be surrendered unconditionally and that the Polish Army be evacuated and disarmed in Płock, where it was to await the decision of the tsar either to pardon the Polish soldiers or imprison them as rebels. Krukowiecki declined and insisted that the uprising was not a rebellion but a war waged by two independent states. He wanted Paskevich and Grand Duke Michael to promise the return of Poland's independence and a general amnesty in exchange for revoking the act of deposition of Nicholas from the Polish throne. The negotiations were stormy and around noon the Polish commander departed for Warsaw to consult the Sejm about further actions. Paskevich agreed to extend the cease-fire to 13:00, and to continue negotiations even if warfare was resumed.

To gain support of the parliament, Krukowiecki asked General Prądzyński to represent him during the joint session of the Sejm and Senate. His political plan was to end the uprising at all costs and return to status quo ante, with himself as the "saviour of the fatherland" who stopped further bloodshed. In his speech Prądzyński seriously inflated the Russian force, and also underestimated the strength of the Polish units. He also warned that the city's inhabitants would be massacred as in 1794 should fighting continue, and stated that the return to full independence under the sceptre of Nicholas was easily achievable, something he knew for sure was not true. He failed to convince his government and the Sejm that surrender was the only option, and a heated debate extended past the deadline of 13:00. The Russians resumed hostilities, and artillery from both sides started yet another duel.

==== Operational situation ====
Both sides suffered similar casualties during the previous day. Russian victories gave their artillery a clear line of fire into the suburbs of Czyste and Wola. They also strengthened the morale of Russian soldiers, who were convinced that the battle was over once Fort 54 fell. The battle was far from lost for the Polish side though: although the Russians could now attack the third line of Polish defences in Wola (Forts 23 and 24) or Czyste (Forts 20–22), their attacks could easily be flanked by forts of the second line still in Polish hands. Also, in order to support the advance with artillery, the Russian guns would have to be stationed in open field.

The Polish plans for the battle remained unchanged. Fort 59 was evacuated and Polish positions around Czyste and close to Jerozolimskie Gate were slightly reinforced, yet Polish forces remained almost equally split between the western and southern sectors. Unknown to the Poles, Russian orders for 7 September were not changed either. The II Infantry Corps was to attack the group of forts at Czyste (21 and 22), while the I Infantry Corps assaulted further north (Forts 23 and 24). Muraviev's forces were to attack the Jerozolimskie Gate, while the remaining forces continued with their diversionary attacks of the previous day.

When artillery fire was restarted around 13:30, the Russian soldiers were not yet ready for the attack. The previous night had been very cold, (Note: At sunrise the temperature did not exceed 4 °C (39 °F).) and most Russian soldiers had no winter garments and spent the night in open field. Many did not receive any food in the morning, and the morale dropped significantly. When the Russians started to sort their ranks, General Umiński correctly assumed that the main attack in his sector would be aimed at the Jerozolimskie Gate. He reinforced the area with his reserves, including almost the entire 4th Infantry Division and 2nd Cavalry Division. He also dispatched the 1st Cavalry Division (1,300 men) closer to Czyste. Generals Małachowski and Dembiński intended to attack the flank of the Russians assaulting Wola with a strong force (3,500 infantry, 800 cavalry and 10 pieces of horse artillery) under General Paweł Muchowski gathered in Młociny (near Fort 62a). Once it became clear that the Russians would attack further south, the plan was called off and the western sector returned to fixed defences.

==== Grand Battery ====
Around 13:30, 132 Russian cannons and four mortars, including 94 guns of the Grand Battery under Prince Mikhail Dmitrievich Gorchakov, opened fire on Polish positions. The Poles initially responded with 79 field artillery pieces and 10 rocket launchers, but by 14:00 General Bem moved another 31 guns to a position right in front of the Russian artillery. To counter the threat, the Russian General von Toll (Note: Earlier that day von Toll replaced Paskevich as commanding officer of the army pending the latter's recovery.) ordered his Grand Battery to advance 100 metres (330 ft) closer to the Poles. This exposed his flank to Polish guns hidden to the south, near the road to Kraków. The Russians suffered casualties, and the Grand Battery had to be split into two separate units. To make matters worse for the Russians, many batteries had to cease fire and withdraw due to insufficient ammunition reserves.

Seeing that the artillery would not break the Polish, General von Toll devised a new plan of attack. He decided to disregard Paskevich's order not to assault Warsaw. Although dusk was nearing, (Note: Sunset was around 18:10.) von Toll ordered an all-out assault on both the western and southern fronts. As there was no time for proper artillery preparation, von Toll wanted to overwhelm the defenders by sheer numerical superiority, even if it meant increased casualties from Polish artillery. To distract the Polish artillery at Czyste and prevent it from firing at the Russian columns attacking Forts 21 and 22, Muraviev's forces were to lead the attack directly towards the Jerozolimskie Gate. Before 15:00, von Toll dispatched General Neidhardt to Paskevich to receive his blessing for the new plan, but Paskevich categorically refused, and ordered his subordinate to continue shelling the Polish forts with artillery at least until 16:00. As the Russian commander-in-chief was away, von Toll decided to act despite Paskevich's orders.

==== Muraviev's assault and retreat ====
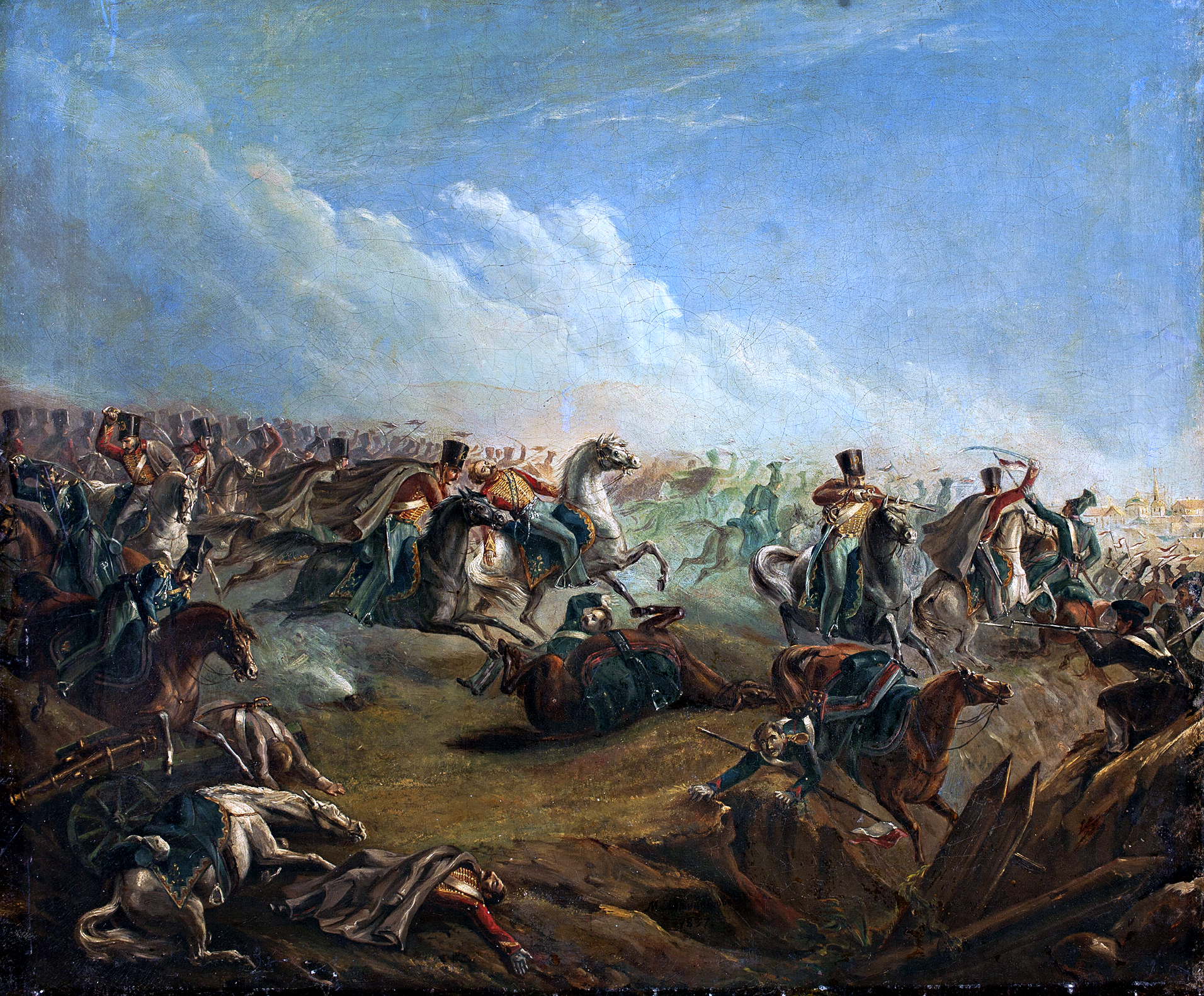
Russian hussars charging towards Warsaw (7 September 1831), painting by Mikhail Lermontov

Around 15:00, masses of Russian troops started preparations for the assault on Polish positions near the Jerozolimskie Gate. A strong force under Muraviev and Nostitz occupied positions on both sides of the road towards Cracow, near Rakowiec. The screening force included the Grenadier Brigade (ca. 1700 infantry, 16 guns), Cuirasseur Brigade (ca. 1,300 cavalry, 16 guns), Guard Uhlans Regiment (392 cavalry) and three cavalry regiments (ca. 1,700 cavalry, 16 guns). Between the screening forces two columns were formed. The left column commanded by Col. Nikolai Lukash was composed of Lutsk and Samogitian Infantry Regiments (1989 men altogether), with the Finland Guard Regiment in reserve (1,374 men). The column was to storm the Fort 74. The right column was commanded by Col. Roth and was composed of a reinforced Nieśwież Infantry Regiment (1278 men), with the 4th Jäger Regiment (900 men), Guards Rifle Regiment (1,353 men) and the Finland Rifles (142 men) in reserve. This column was to assault Fort 72. On the southern front the forces of Strandmann were to attack in force towards Królikarnia and elsewhere, to pressure the Poles on more than one front. (Note: Despite the orders, Strandmann's forces, exhausted after the fights of the previous day, remained mostly passive, and only skirmishers and small Cossack detachments harassed the Polish defences there. One Cossack unit briefly occupied Siekierki around 15:00, but was quickly defeated and had to flee. After that the southern front remained peaceful for the remainder of the day.)

The assault started around 16:00. The left column suffered significant casualties, but reached Fort 74, only to be met by Polish reinforcements dispatched by General Antoni Wroniecki, the commanding officer of this sector. Two thousand Russians clashed with less than 850 Poles inside the fort, but were defeated in a bayonet charge and had to retreat. As the attack failed and the Polish artillery batteries were still active, von Toll decided to use his cavalry reserves. Two regiments of the 3rd Cuirassier Division (1,200 cavalry) followed a road linking Szczęśliwice and Czyste, and were ordered to charge the Polish artillery from behind. The Poles had full visibility of the battlefield and had enough time to prepare for the attack, as the Russian advance slowed down due to swampy terrain. When the Russian cavalry switched from columns to battle line, Polish artillery opened canister shot fire on the Russians, dispersing them. The Russian commander reorganised his forces and repeated the charge, but the Russians were again repelled before reaching the Polish artillery emplacements. The Novgorod Cuirassier Regiment alone lost over 200 men out of 450 taking part in the charge.

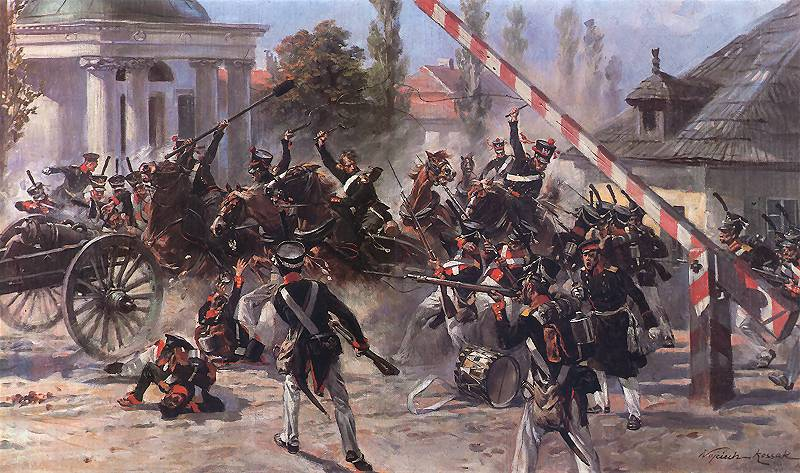
Jabłonowski's battery defending the Jerozolimskie Gate, an 1897 painting by Wojciech Kossak

After half an hour the Russians finally stormed the ramparts of Fort 74 and defeated the Polish battalion defending it. This forced the Polish mobile artillery in Czyste, until then shelling the advancing Russian columns and their Grand Battery, to fall back. Meanwhile, the Russian right column was approaching Fort 72. Defended by only 200 men, the fort was approached by the Russian spearhead formed by the reinforced Nieśwież Regiment. Seeing this, the Polish commander ordered his cavalry reserve to charge the Russian infantry. Russian grenadiers stormed the ramparts of Fort 72, but were repelled and forced back behind the moat, where the Polish cavalry charged them. The Russians formed infantry squares, but were defeated and forced to retreat. To counter the threat to Russian infantry, General Nostitz charged his own cavalry reserve under General Georg von Sass, and a cavalry battle ensued.

This saved Roth's infantry, as the Polish artillery's line of fire was blocked by both Polish and Russian cavalrymen. Both commanders threw more cavalry into the fight and soon the forces of both sides were similar, with 550 cavalrymen on both sides. Both forces soon lost cohesion and the battle turned into a series of duels between Polish Uhlans and Hussars (armed with lances and sabres) and Russian Cuirassiers and Dragoons (armed with heavier swords). The Poles were initially victorious and managed to incapacitate both General Nostitz and General von Sass, but were then attacked by additional Russian reinforcements and had to retreat. This forced some of the Polish artillery crews to retreat to the ramparts of the third line as well. The Russian Guard Hussar Regiment under Georg von Arpshofen, riding dapple grey heavy horses and wearing distinctive bright red uniforms, pursued the fleeing Polish cavalry to the space between forts 71 and 72. There they were met by Polish cavalry reinforcements: the 3rd Mounted Rifle Regiment was to hold the Hussars in place, while the 4th Uhlans Regiment was to attack the Russians from the flank. Before the plan could be enacted, the Russian veterans broke through this new Polish line of defence. The 3rd Regiment broke and started a retreat, followed by the Russians. General Umiński ordered his infantry and artillery to open fire at the mass of cavalry, both Polish and Russian. Small groups of Russians retreated to rejoin their lines, while others in apparent war fury tried to storm the heavily defended gates of Warsaw and were killed by Polish infantry. A small group succeeded and the last of them was killed as far as the gate of the Ujazdów Palace, 4 kilometres (2.5 mi) into the city. The cavalry battle ended with all three regiments engaged in the skirmish almost annihilated.

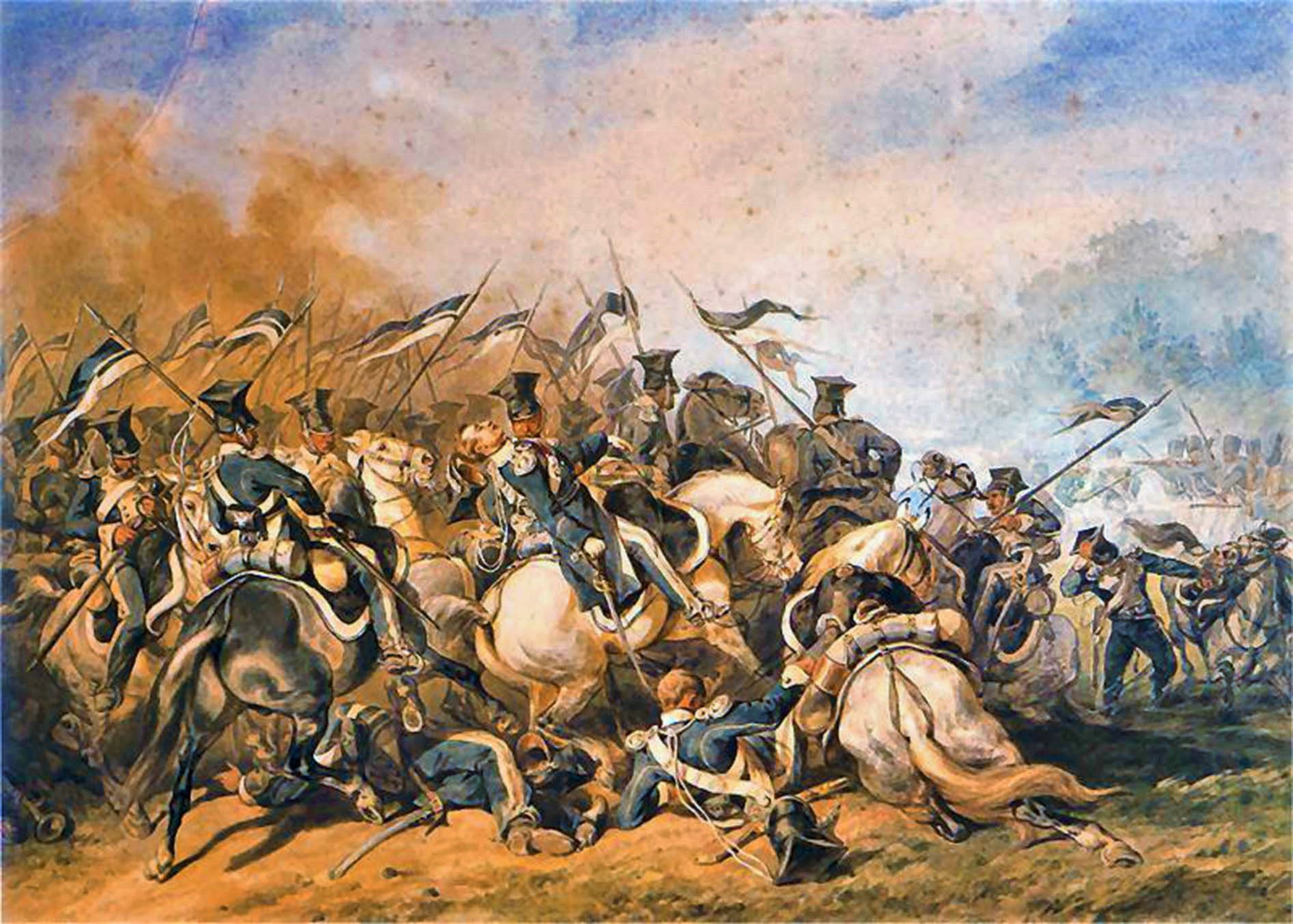
Polish cavalry charging Russian forces, an 1873 painting by Juliusz Kossak

Although the Poles managed to contain and defeat the Russian cavalry, its charge and initial successes caused widespread panic in Polish ranks. The garrison of Fort 72 abandoned its positions, leaving its guns behind, and retreated to Fort 73 without a fight. Likewise, the garrison of Fort 73 panicked, and its commanding officer, Col. Przedpełski, ordered his soldiers to block the guns, abandon the main rampart and assume defensive positions facing the back wall of the fort, expecting the Russian cavalry to enter the fortification from behind. This allowed the Russian infantry to capture Fort 72, a fortified "Red Inn" (Polish: Karczma Czerwona) and head towards Fort 73 unopposed. Polish officers managed to contain the panic just in time for their infantrymen to open rank fire on the approaching Russians and force them to withdraw. Fort 72 remained in Russian hands.

The apparent panic in Polish ranks convinced Muraviev to renew his assault with fresh forces, despite the losses his columns had suffered. Col. Lukash's grenadiers reinforced with two battalions of the Finnish Guards Regiment (1,300 men, four guns) outflanked Fort 73 from the north and captured a brickyard and yet another fortified inn, the Karczma Żelazna directly to its rear. Its garrison offered only light resistance before retreating in disarray. The situation seemed critical, as the Russians were now in possession of a large part of the second line of Polish defences.

Despite the apparent gravity of the situation, the Polish defenders still had sufficient fresh troops to counter-attack and regain the initiative. The Russians' recently captured positions were too far ahead of their artillery, and were all under well-aimed fire from Polish fixed artillery positions on the ramparts of the third line of defences, as well as numerous mobile artillery batteries. Forts 72 and 73, as well as the Karczma Żelazna inn and the brickyard received constant grapeshot fire. Under fire from all sides, the Russians had to hide behind the outer sides of the ramparts, unable to return fire or even observe the field in front of them. Tirailleurs of the Polish 3rd Foot Rifle Regiment approached the Karczma Żelazna inn almost unopposed and retook it. Soon afterwards they retook the brickyard as well. The Russians abandoned the two forts as well and although Russian light infantry tried to retake them, they were unsuccessful. Around 16:45 the field artillery batteries of Józef Bem were free to leave the safety of the inner defences, return to the battlefield, and open fire on the Grand Battery. Despite over three hours of intensive fighting in the west, the commander of the relatively peaceful southern sector, General Małachowski, did not reinforce the defenders of the western approaches.

==== Russian assault in the west ====
Although Muraviev's attack failed, it forced the Polish artillery to lessen the pressure on the Russian Grand Battery, which was now free to support the main Russian attack on the westernmost Polish defences. By that time the Grand Battery could shell the ramparts of the second line with relative impunity, thus damaging both the defences and the morale of the crews. Polish infantrymen manning the forts were ordered to lie down behind the gabions, which minimised the losses. Soldiers in the field had no such cover, and suffered casualties. (Note: A battalion of the 5th Regiment of Foot Rifles manning the garden of Unruh family suffered up to 50 per cent casualties during the three-hour barrage.) The Grand Battery also silenced some of the guns in Forts 21, 22 and 23.

General von Toll initially planned to order his infantry to start the assault at 16:00, but Paskevich through his aides ordered him to postpone the attack until 16:45. Eventually around 5:00 von Kreutz's corps advanced towards Forts 21 and 22 in two columns. Russian horse artillery reached a position 200 paces from Fort 22 and started shelling the defenders at close range. Already shaken by the fire of the Grand Battery, the Poles abandoned the fort and retreated before the surprised Russian infantry approached. It was a rare example of artillery capturing a fortified position without the help of other forces. Meanwhile, the fighting for the nearby Fort 22 was heavy. In the end its garrison fell almost to the last man.

Simultaneously, von Pahlen's Corps attacked forts 23 and 24, and the Polish position at the Evangelical Cemetery. Heavy fighting followed, and many Russian commanders, including Paskevich, proposed that further fighting be postponed until the following day. General von Toll insisted on reaching the last line of Polish defences before sunset. The surrounding forts changed hands many times, but in the end most of them remained in Russian hands by 22:00, when the Russians broke off. Around midnight General Berg arrived in Warsaw with a new ultimatum signed by Paskevich.

==== Polish surrender ====
General Prądzyński was once again dispatched to the Russian headquarters, where he was greeted by Grand Duke Michael Pavlovich as Paskevich had been wounded shortly before. Although Michael believed the Poles were playing for time to allow Ramorino's Corps to return from Podlasie, Prądzyński convinced him to send General Berg to Warsaw with a draft of an act of unconditional surrender. The agreement (apparently never signed on paper) stipulated that the Polish Army was free to leave the city, a two-day cease-fire would come into effect and that Warsaw would be spared the horrors it experienced during the 1794 siege. No political clauses were included. Around 17:00 Prądzyński and Berg arrived in Warsaw, where Krukowiecki generally agreed with the Russian terms but considered them too harsh. Berg and Prądzyński then returned to Russian headquarters and Grand Duke Michael agreed to allow the Polish Army free passage to Modlin and Płock, an amnesty to all fighters of the Uprising, and to exchange prisoners. The new terms were more than acceptable to Krukowiecki. Upon Prądzyński's return the more liberal wing of the government won a temporary majority, and Krukowiecki was ousted from power and replaced with Bonawentura Niemojowski as head of government and General Kazimierz Małachowski as Commander-in-Chief.

=== 8 September ===
The ultimatum required that Warsaw be surrendered immediately, along with the bridge and the suburb of Praga, and threatened the complete destruction of the city the following day. Following a heated debate, the new Polish authorities decided to comply by 5:00. Małachowski sent a letter to Paskevich notifying him that the army was withdrawing to Płock "to avoid further bloodshed and to prove its loyalty". The letter also expressed his hope that the Russians would allow free passage to troops unable to withdraw by the deadline, and that the army would honour the terms negotiated with Grand Duke Michael. The surrender of Warsaw was thus not a formal convention, but rather the effect of lengthy negotiations. The Russians initially respected its terms.

The Polish Army withdrew across the Vistula and continued north towards the Modlin Fortress. The Sejm, Senate and many civilians also left the city "in grim silence". Many soldiers, including high-ranking officers, decided to stay in the city and lay down their arms. Up to 5,000 soldiers stayed in Warsaw, along with 600 officers, among them Generals Krukowiecki, Małachowski, Chrzanowski and Prądzyński. The food stores were opened, and their contents were distributed among the civilians.

The following evening Grand Duke Michael Pavlovich entered the city leading his Imperial Guard; Warsaw capitulated.

== Aftermath ==
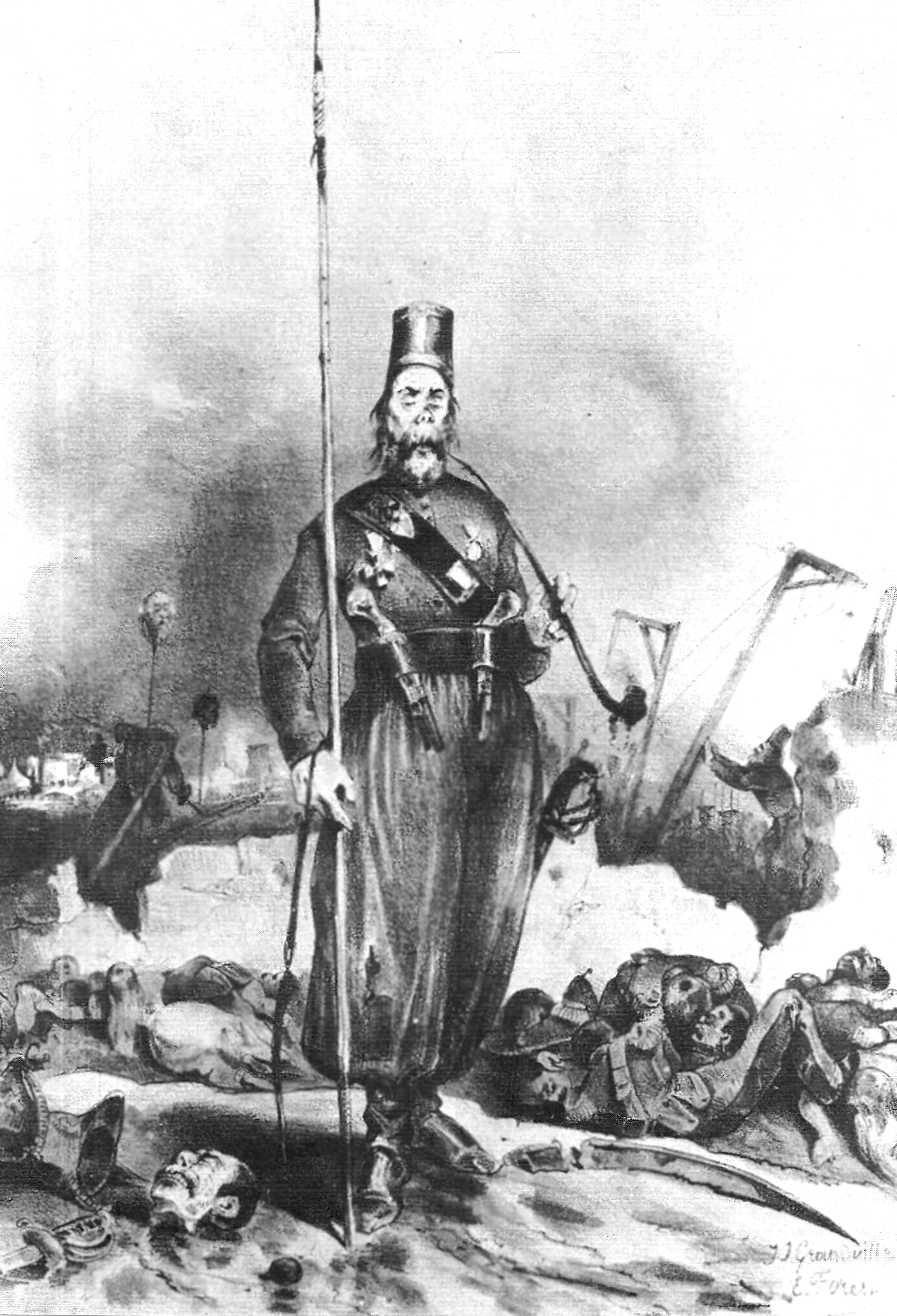
Order reigns in Warsaw, French caricature, 1831

Although no large-scale evacuation of supplies from Warsaw was ordered, the Modlin Fortress was well prepared for a lengthy siege. Its magazines contained over 25,000 cannonballs, almost 900 thousand musket and rifle rounds and enough provisions for several months of full siege. The treasury of the Polish government was still intact and contained more than 6.5 million złotys.

The fall of Warsaw was synonymous with the fall of Poland, both to Poles and to foreigners. To commemorate the crushing of the November Uprising, Alexander Pushkin wrote "On the Taking of Warsaw", hailing the capitulation of Poland's capital as the "final triumph" of Mother Russia. Other writers and poets joined in to celebrate, among them Vasily Zhukovsky, Fyodor Tyutchev and Aleksey Khomyakov. Soon afterwards the tsar practically dismantled the Kingdom of Poland: its constitution was abolished, the government given to Russian officials and its Warsaw University closed.

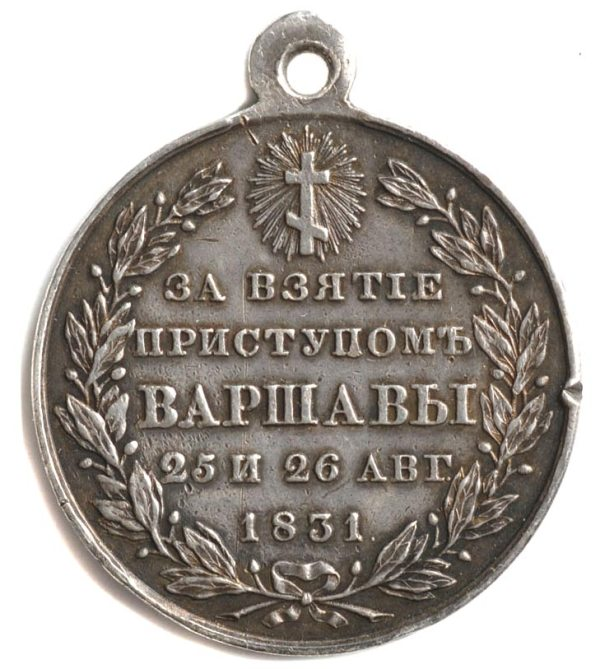
The Russian medal awarded for capturing Warsaw was worn on the same ribbon as the Polish order of Virtuti Militari

The news of the fall of Warsaw spread quickly. The French government, until then pressured both by Polish emissaries and by its own opposition to support the Poles, was relieved: French Minister of Foreign Affairs Horace Sébastiani declared to the Chamber of Deputies that "Order now reigns in Warsaw". The phrase became one of the best-known comments on the fall of Warsaw and was later often ridiculed by the supporters of the Polish cause. The Russian capture of the city in 1831 incited a wave of sympathy towards Poles. Several towns in the United States voted to change their names to Warsaw after the news of the battle reached their residents, among them Warsaw, Virginia and Warsaw, Kentucky.

Shortly after the battle, in December 1831, the tsarist authorities issued a "For the Taking of Warsaw by Assault in 1831" Medal awarded to Russian veterans. A monument "To the Captors of Warsaw" was constructed near the former Redoubt 54. Demolished after Poland regained independence in 1918, the spot is now occupied by a post-war monument to Juliusz Konstanty Ordon and his soldiers. There are plans to move the monument closer to the site of the redoubt.

The Battle of Warsaw is commemorated on the Tomb of the Unknown Soldier, Warsaw, with the inscription "WARSZAWA 6–8 IX 1831".

== Casualties ==
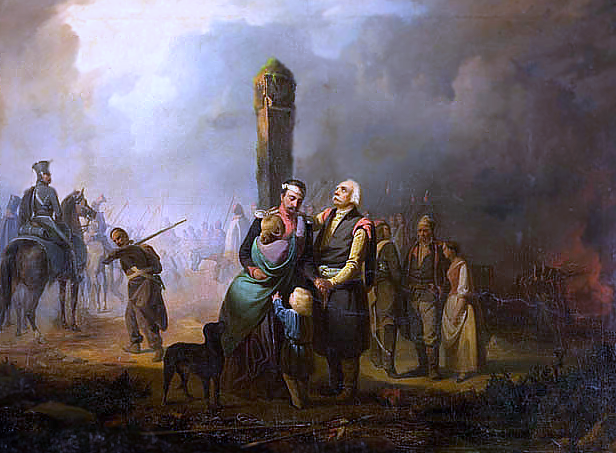
Poles crossing the Prussian frontier, an 1840 allegorical painting by Franciszek Faliński

Early official Russian data assert that between eight and ten thousand were killed or wounded on the Russian side, and between six and seven thousand on the Polish side. Later the number of Polish losses mentioned in the Russian Army's dispatches was given as 139 officers and 7,745 NCOs and soldiers. This number includes both killed and wounded. Other sources give the total Polish casualties as 9,000: "probably at least 3,000" or even "over 4,000" on the first day and between 3,800 and 6,000 on the second day of the battle. Those numbers do not include sick and wounded taken prisoner following the Russian entry into Warsaw. Altogether, the Polish Army lost 16,000 men by 12 September, but this number includes many deserters in the period immediately following the battle.

Official Russian estimates are 2,300–3,000 killed and wounded on the first day, and 7,460 on the second day. Both numbers are considered "ridiculously low" by later Polish historians. Tomasz Strzeżek in his 1998 monograph of the battle notes that the official casualty figure was 10,559 Russian soldiers killed in action, including two generals, 16 colonels, 47 officers and 1,767 NCOs, as well as 1,182 soldiers missing and presumed dead. He notes that this might have been understated as some Russian regiments suffered tremendous losses, as evidenced by their official roll papers, but the data was apparently omitted in the army's official documents. (Note: For instance the Guards Dragoon Regiment had only 177 officers and soldiers on 8 September, and the Vologda Infantry Regiment had only 300 bayonets after its attack on Jerozolimskie Gate. Suvorov's Grenadier Regiment lost 530 soldiers out of 830 it had before the battle.) After the battle there were 7,000 wounded Russian soldiers in Warsaw's hospitals, and 5,000 in field hospitals outside the city. (Note: Earlier monograph by Mierosławski cites 12,000 Russian wounded treated in Warsaw alone.) The casualty rate among the wounded Russians was very high due to the low number of medical staff in the Russian army. Strzeżek estimates that between 14,000 and 16,000 Russians were killed or died of their wounds, and 4,000 were missing and presumed dead. At the time of the capitulation, the Poles held at least 3,000 Russian prisoners of war in Warsaw; the Russians held 2,590.
