= Warsaw Trade Tower =

Skyscraper in Warsaw, Poland

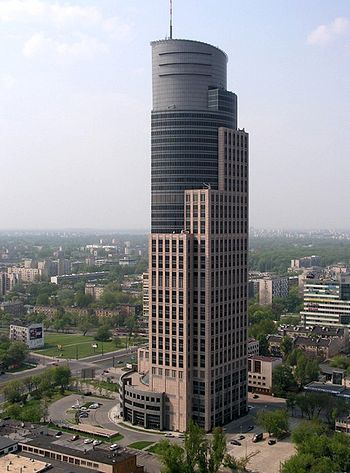
- Interactive map of the Warsaw Trade Tower area

General information
- Status: Completed
- Type: Office
- Location: Warsaw, Poland
- Coordinates: 52°14′08″N 20°58′59″E
- Construction started: June 1997
- Completed: November 1999
- Owner: Globalworth

Height
- Architectural: 184 m (604 ft)
- Antenna spire: 208 m (682 ft)
- Top floor: 176 m (577 ft)

Technical details
- Floor count: 43
- Floor area: 71,567 m^{2} (770,340 sq ft)

Design and construction
- Developer: Daewoo
- Main contractor: Mostostal Warszawa S.A. Warbud

The Warsaw Trade Tower (WTT) is a skyscraper in Warsaw, Poland. Along with Varso Tower, Palace of Culture and Science, Warsaw Spire and Warsaw Unit, it is one of the five buildings in Warsaw with a spire height greater than 200 metres (660 ft). The tower is the seventh tallest building in Warsaw and the ninth tallest in Poland.

== Overview ==
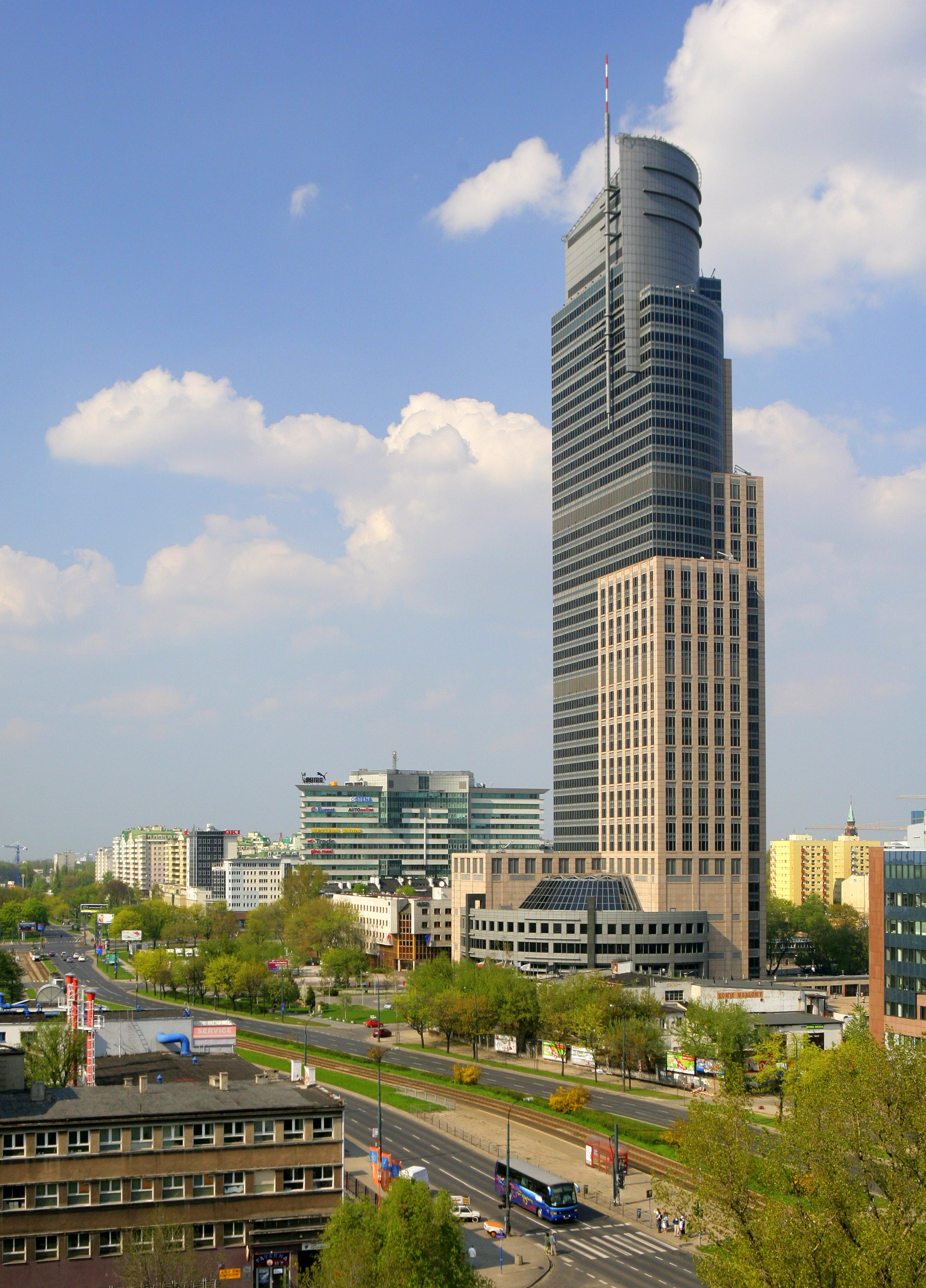
Warsaw Trade Tower as seen from Towarowa Street

The Warsaw Trade Tower is located in the Wola district, at Chłodna and Towarowa streets, two blocks from the Warsaw Uprising Museum. The 43-storey skyscraper has a height of 208 metres (682 ft), with its roof height being 184 metres (604 ft). The 85 metres (279 ft) spire attached to the building starts on the 32nd floor and rises up to 24 m (79 ft) above the roof.

The tower includes offices, a two-storey shopping centre and three floors of underground parking for 300 cars. It has one of Europe's fastest elevators, travelling at a speed of 7 metres per second (23 ft/s).

Construction took place from June 1997 to November 1999 by the Korean company Daewoo. In 2002, Daewoo sold the property to the American firm Apollo-Rida. Since 2009 the owner and manager of the building has been the real estate company Globalworth.

Between 2015 and 2016, the WTT underwent a thorough modernisation. As a result of the implemented changes, the facility gained a number of amenities that set the standards of modern office buildings. Further renovations in 2023 included a new lobby for the tower designed by the MIXD architectural studio.

== See also ==
- List of tallest buildings in Poland
