= Ghelamco =

Belgian real estate developer

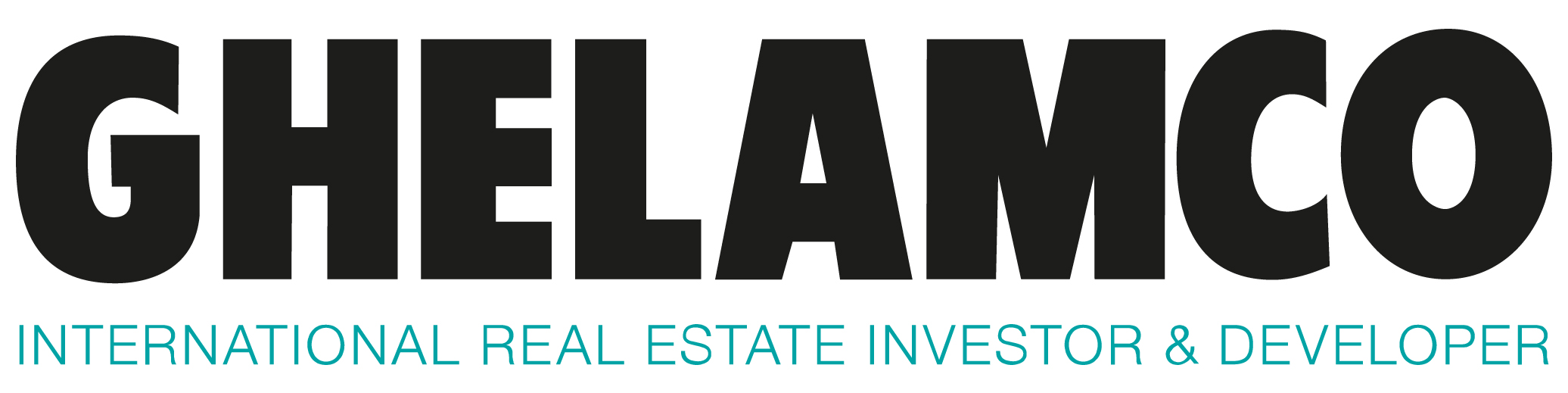
- Company type: Private
- Industry: Real estate development
- Founded: 1985; 40 years ago in Belgium
- Founder: Paul Gheysens
- Headquarters: Ypres, Belgium
- Area served: Belgium, Poland, United Kingdom, France, Cyprus
- Key people: Marie-Julie Gheysens; Michael Gheysens; Jarosław Zagórski
- Owner: Paul Gheysens
- Website: ghelamco.com

Ghelamco is a Belgian real estate developer founded in 1985. Based in Ypres, the company currently carries out investments in Belgium, Poland, the United Kingdom, France and Cyprus.

Ghelamco is one of the largest developers of office properties in Central and Eastern Europe.

== History ==
Ghelamco was established in Belgium in 1985 by Paul Gheysens, who is still the CEO and majority shareholder.

Ghelamco initially worked as a general contractor in the construction of industrial plants. The company's activities were later expanded to include small office and residential projects in Belgium. The group developed several residential complexes with single and multi-family buildings as well as commercial units in Brussels, De Panne, Knokke-Heist and Leuven. Further facilities were built in Oostduinkerke, Ghent and Wavre. In 2013, the naming rights to the stadium in Ghent were sold to the Ghelamco Group. Until 2024, the sports facility was called the Ghelamco Arena.

In 1991, the group started investments in Poland, conducting activities in Warsaw, Katowice, Wrocław, Kraków and Łódź. The country has been the one with most activities by Ghelamco. The company has primarily been developing office properties through its Polish property development company Ghelamco Invest and the construction company Ghelamco Poland. Ghelamco further expanded to France in 2015, the United Kingdom in 2020, and Cyprus in 2023.

== Awards and recognition ==
Ghelamco has received numerous awards for its contributions to real estate development. These include the MIPIM Awards and European Property Awards, recognizing the company's commitment to architectural excellence and sustainable development

== Projects ==
- Warsaw Spire – a complex in Warsaw's Plac Europejski, consisting of a 220-metre skyscraper and two 55-metre buildings. The project won the MIPIM Award 2017 for best office project in the world
- Warsaw Unit – a 202-metre skyscraper in the Wola distinct of Warsaw
- The Bridge – a 174-metre skyscraper under construction at Plac Europejski
- The Warsaw Hub – a complex of two 130-metre high-rises and an 86-metre building. The complex was sold to Google in 2022
- The Arc - London - Ghelamco’s first project in the UK. 22-story mixed-use tower lies by Old Street Roundabout
- The HiLight - Apartment complex in London, England
- Nova One - BREEAM and WELL certified office building in Antwerp, Belgium
- The Vibe - Office complex located on Towarowa Street in Warsaw

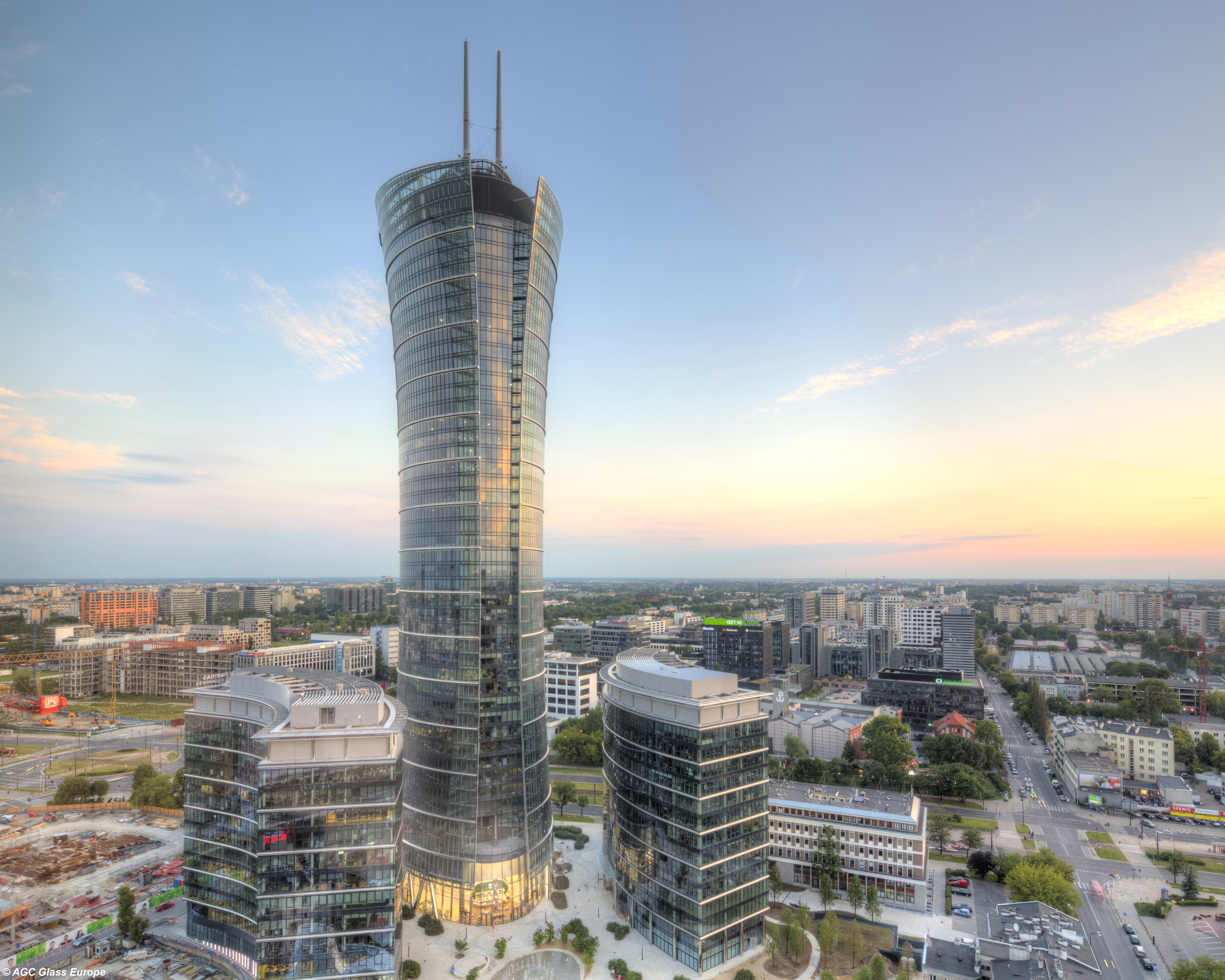
Warsaw Spire

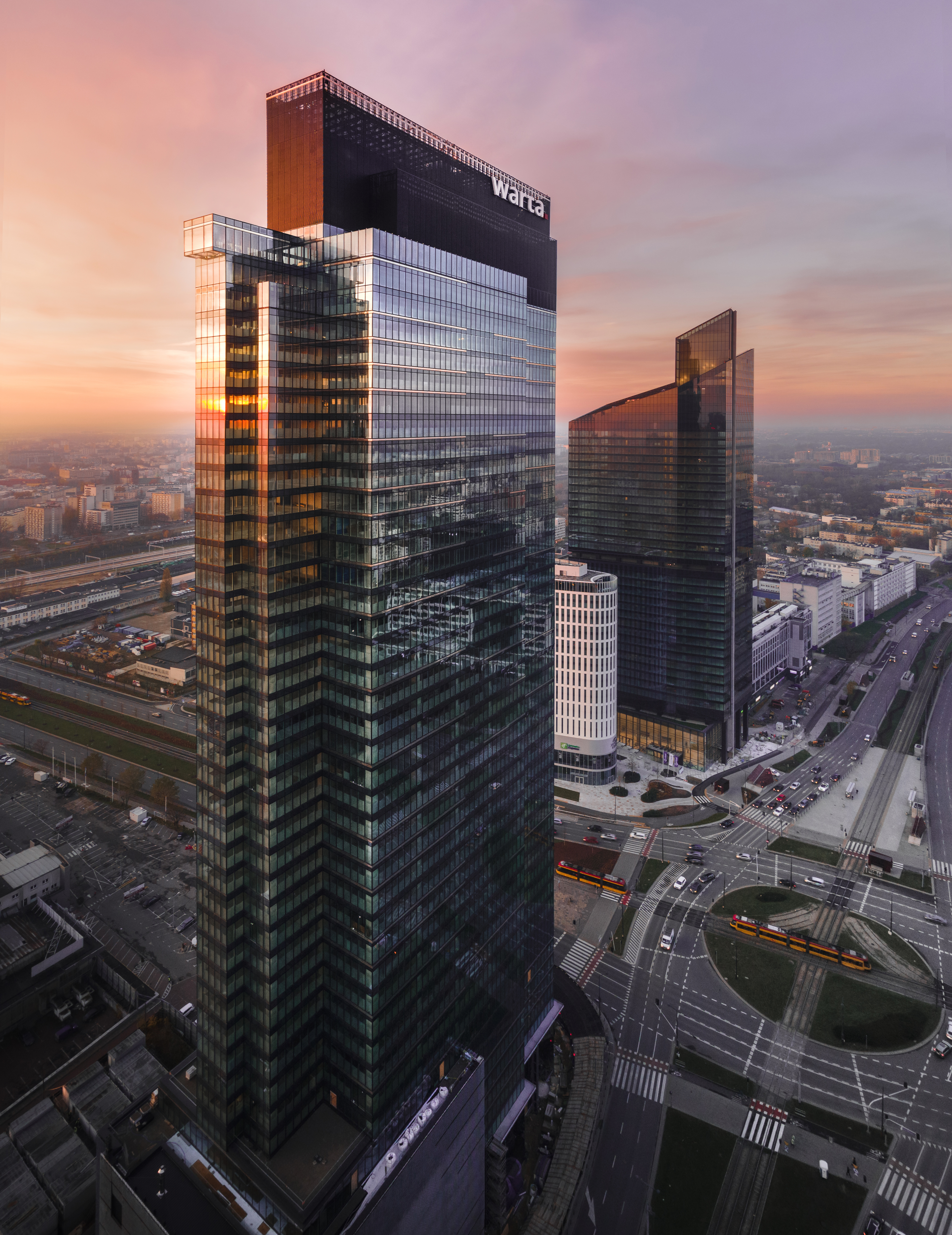
Warsaw Unit

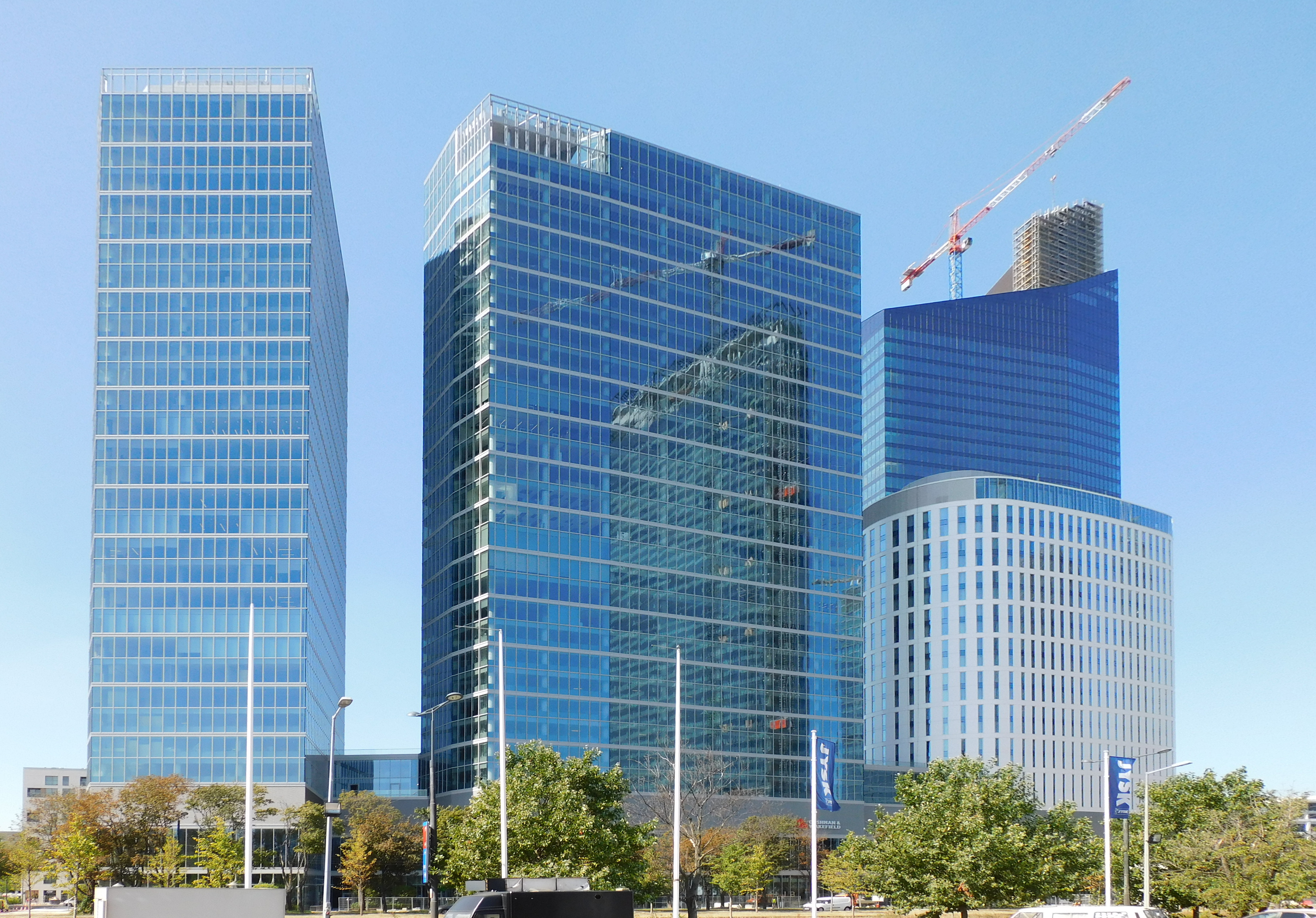
The Warsaw Hub

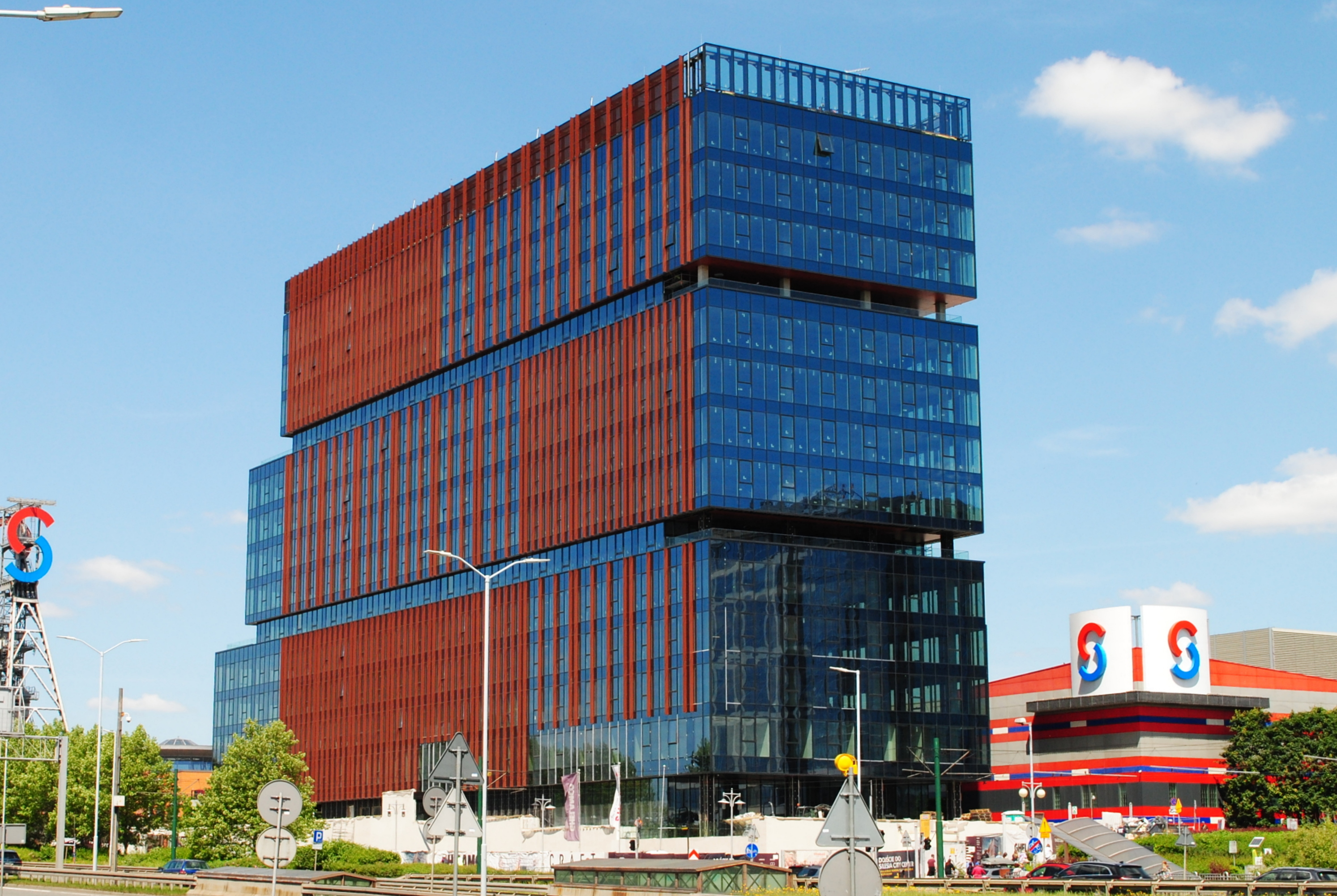
Craft

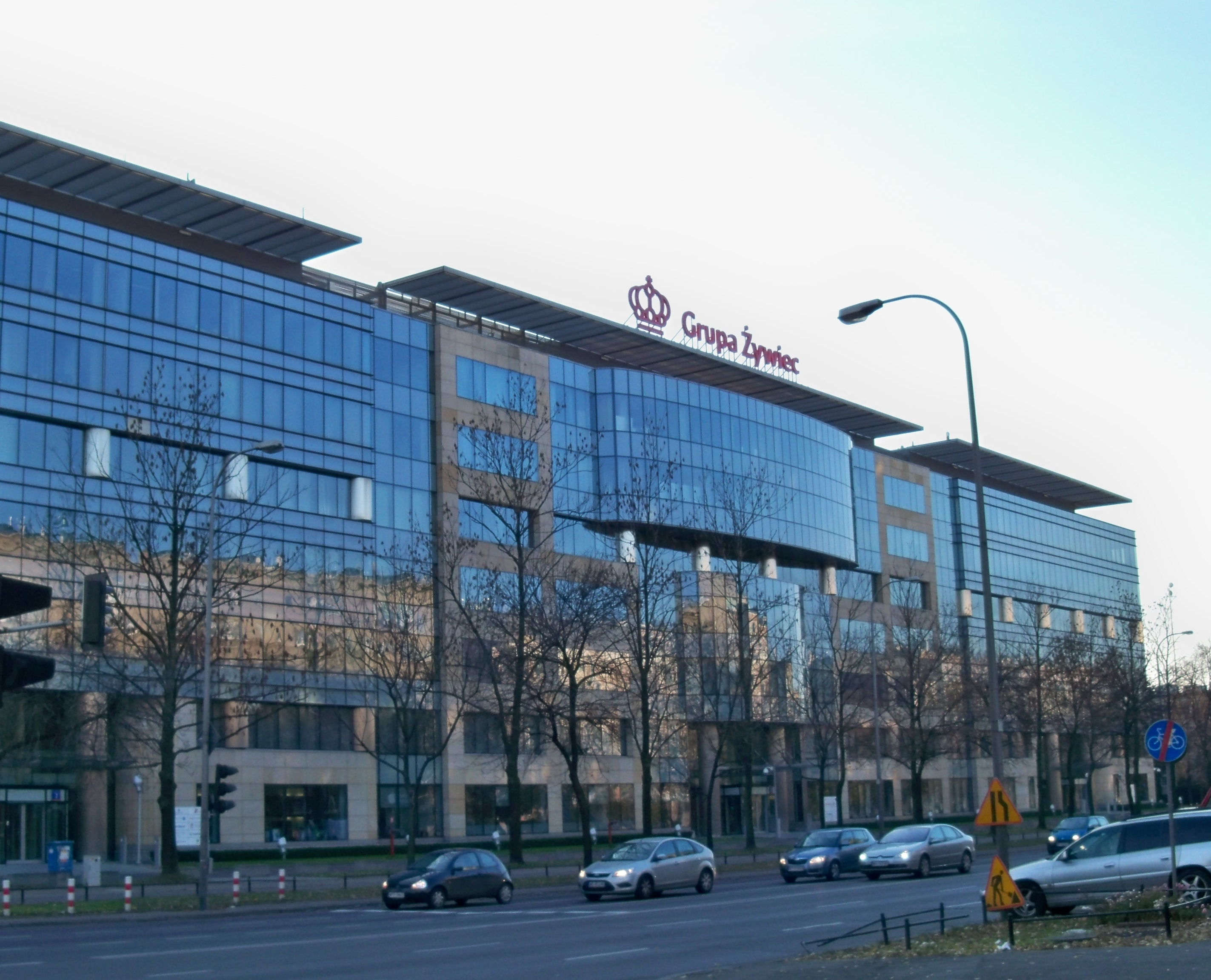
Bitwy Warszawskiej Business Centre

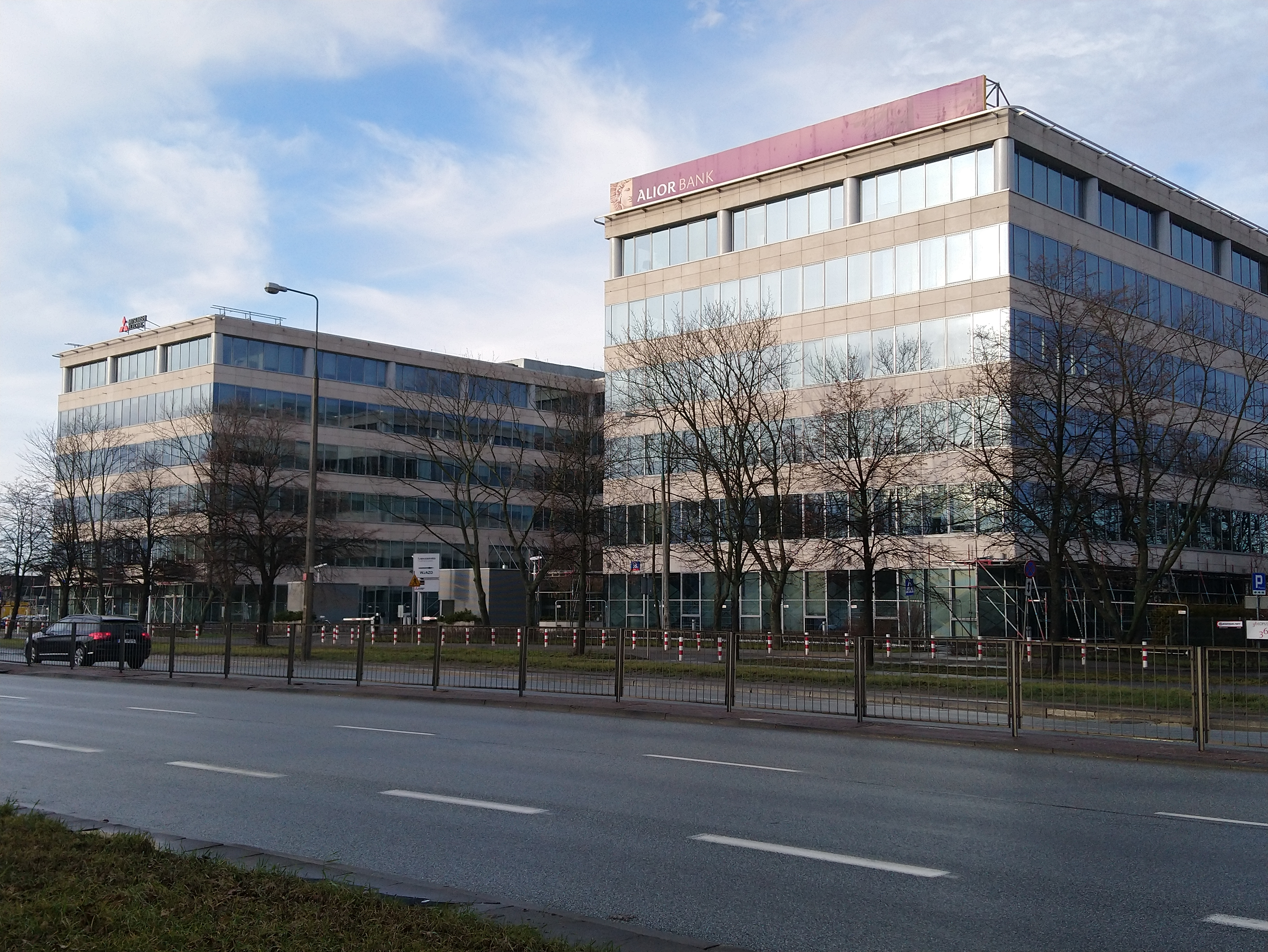
Łopuszańska Business Park
