= The Bridge (Warsaw) =

Skyscraper in Warsaw, Poland

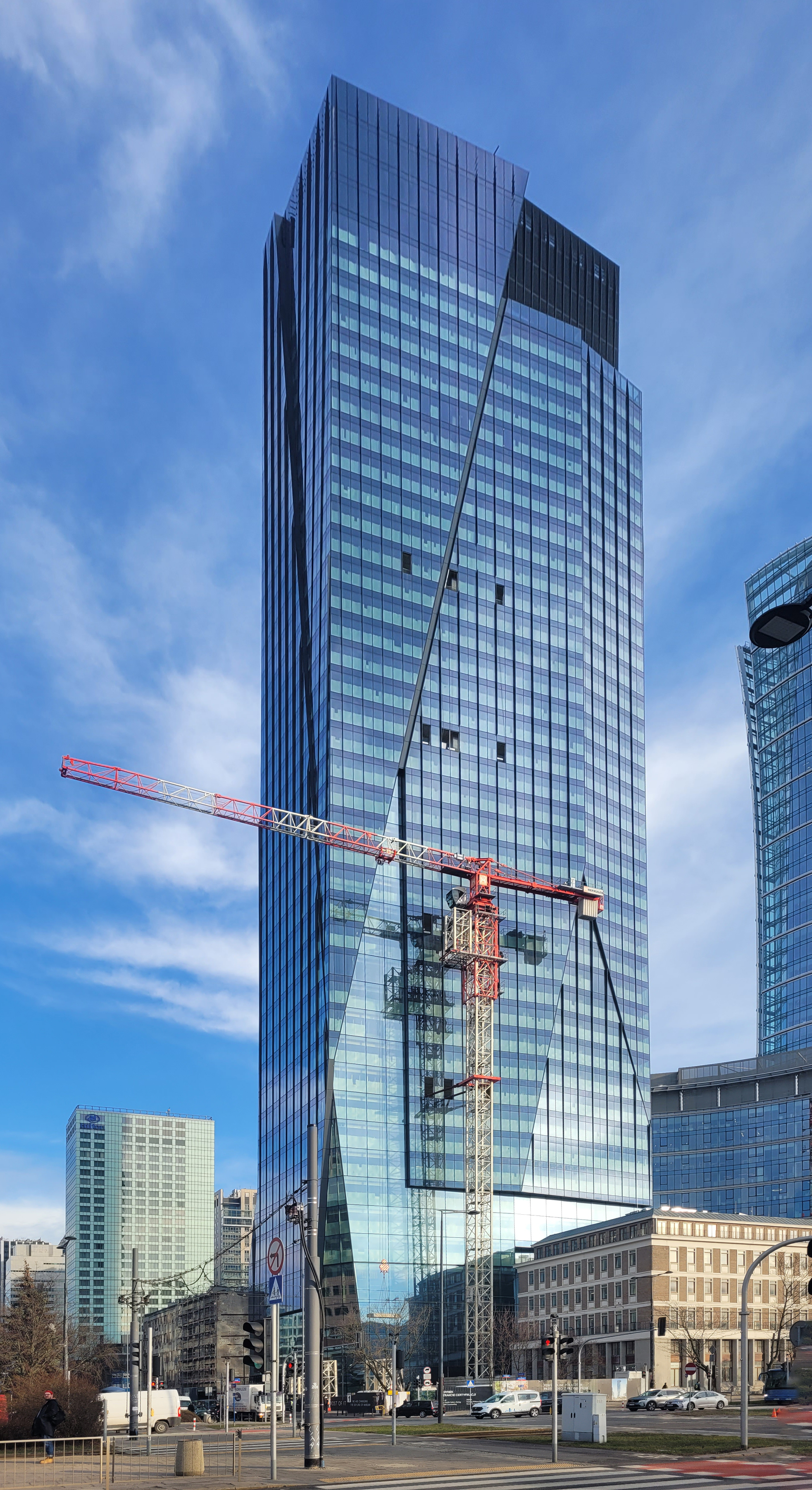
- The Bridge, January 2025
- Interactive map of the The Bridge area

General information
- Status: Completed
- Type: Office
- Architectural style: Modern
- Location: Wola, Warsaw, Poland, Grzybowska 67/69, 00-844, Plac Europejski 3a
- Coordinates: 52°13′59″N 20°59′0″E
- Construction started: July 2021
- Estimated completion: Q3 2025

Height
- Height: 174 m (571 ft)

Technical details
- Structural system: Steel; Reinforced concrete
- Floor count: 40
- Floor area: 49,000 m^{2} (530,000 sq ft)

Design and construction
- Architecture firm: UNStudio; Projekt Polsko-Belgijska Pracownia Architektury
- Developer: Ghelamco

Other information
- Parking: 287

Website
- warsawbridge.com

The Bridge is a 40-storey skyscraper under construction in the Wola district of Warsaw, Poland. Designed by Amsterdam-based UNStudio, the 174 metres (571 ft) tower is due to be completed in 2025 as Poland's tenth tallest building.

== Overview ==
The project by Belgian real estate developer Ghelamco is taking place at Plac Europejski (European Square), standing at the intersection of Towarowa and Grzybowska streets. The skyscraper is situated in the immediate area of the Warsaw Spire complex, which was also developed by Ghelamco.

The architectural concept of the building was designed by the Dutch UNStudio in cooperation with the Polish-Belgian firm Projekt Polsko-Belgijska Pracownia Architektury.

The Bridge's name comes from its special connection to the neighbouring Bellona Building, which formerly housed the headquarters of the Bellona Publishing House. The buildings will be connected by a shared lobby, creating a symbolic "bridge" between the architecture of the old building and that of the new tower.

== Facilities ==
The Bridge's 40 stories will offer 47,000 square metres (510,000 sq ft) of office space. Its four underground floors will feature 287 parking spaces and bicycle facilities. The building will include chargers for electric cars and a special parking lot with charging spots for electric bicycles and scooters.

A characteristic element of the lower level of the tower is its three-storey high lobby with a set of 13 metres (43 ft) long concrete columns forming a letter "V".

On the skyscraper's 40th floor will be located an open sky terrace for the exclusive use of tenants.

== Construction ==
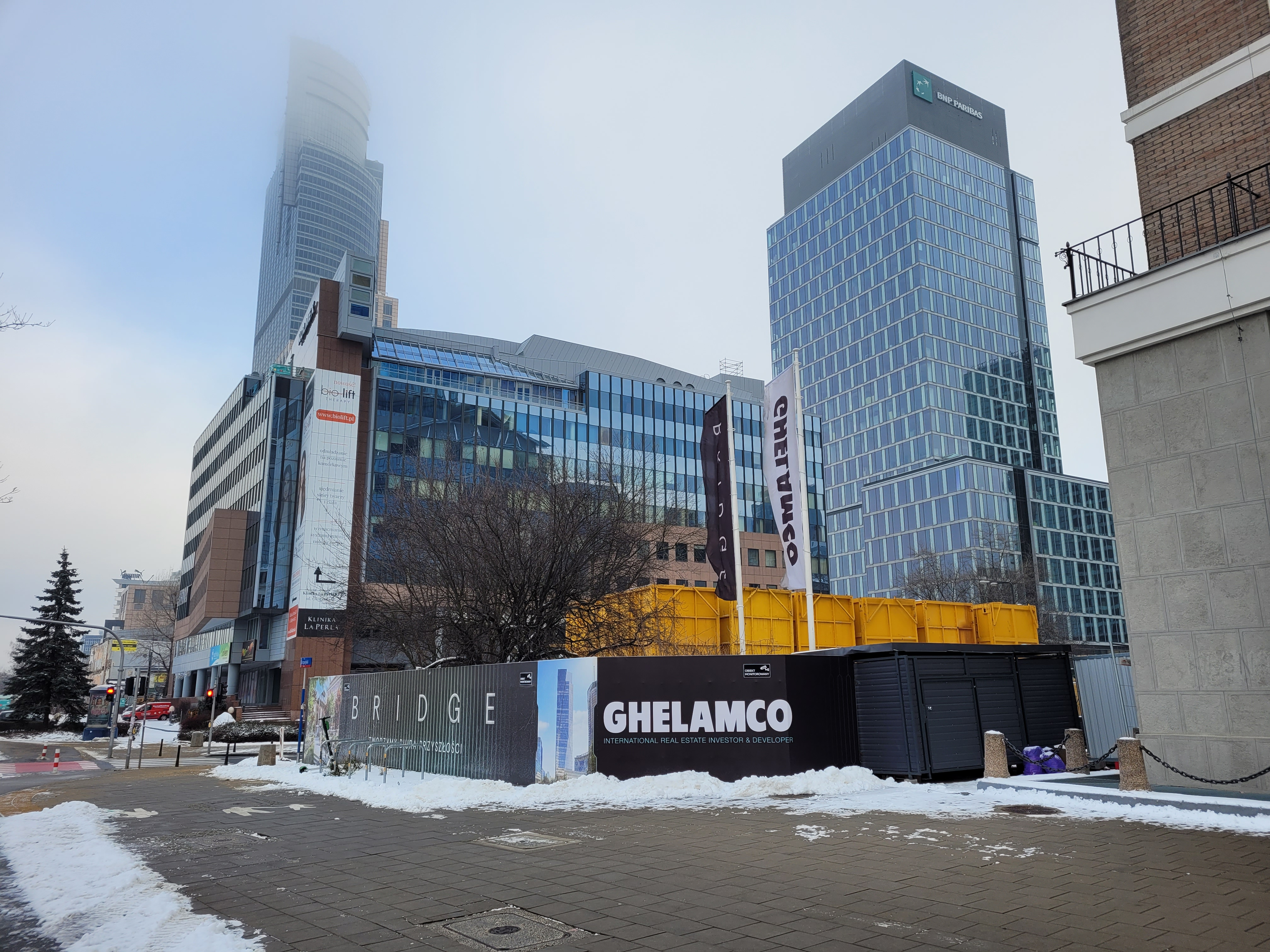
Construction site of The Bridge in December 2021

The project's final concept was unveiled in January 2021. Construction began in July 2021 with works on the underground structure of the building. In October 2022, the foundation work and parking facilities of the tower were completed.

In late December 2022, the development of the core and above-ground floors began. By May 2023, when the building reached its eighth floor, developer Ghelamco announced that the skyscraper had been gaining one floor per week. Work on the glass facade of the tower started in September 2023. The Bridge was topped out in February 2024.

In July 2026 Eastnine acquires the building from Ghelamco.

== See also ==
- List of tallest buildings in Poland
