= Wola =

Major financial district in Warsaw, Poland

Coordinates: 52°14′0″N 20°57′26″E

- Warsaw District
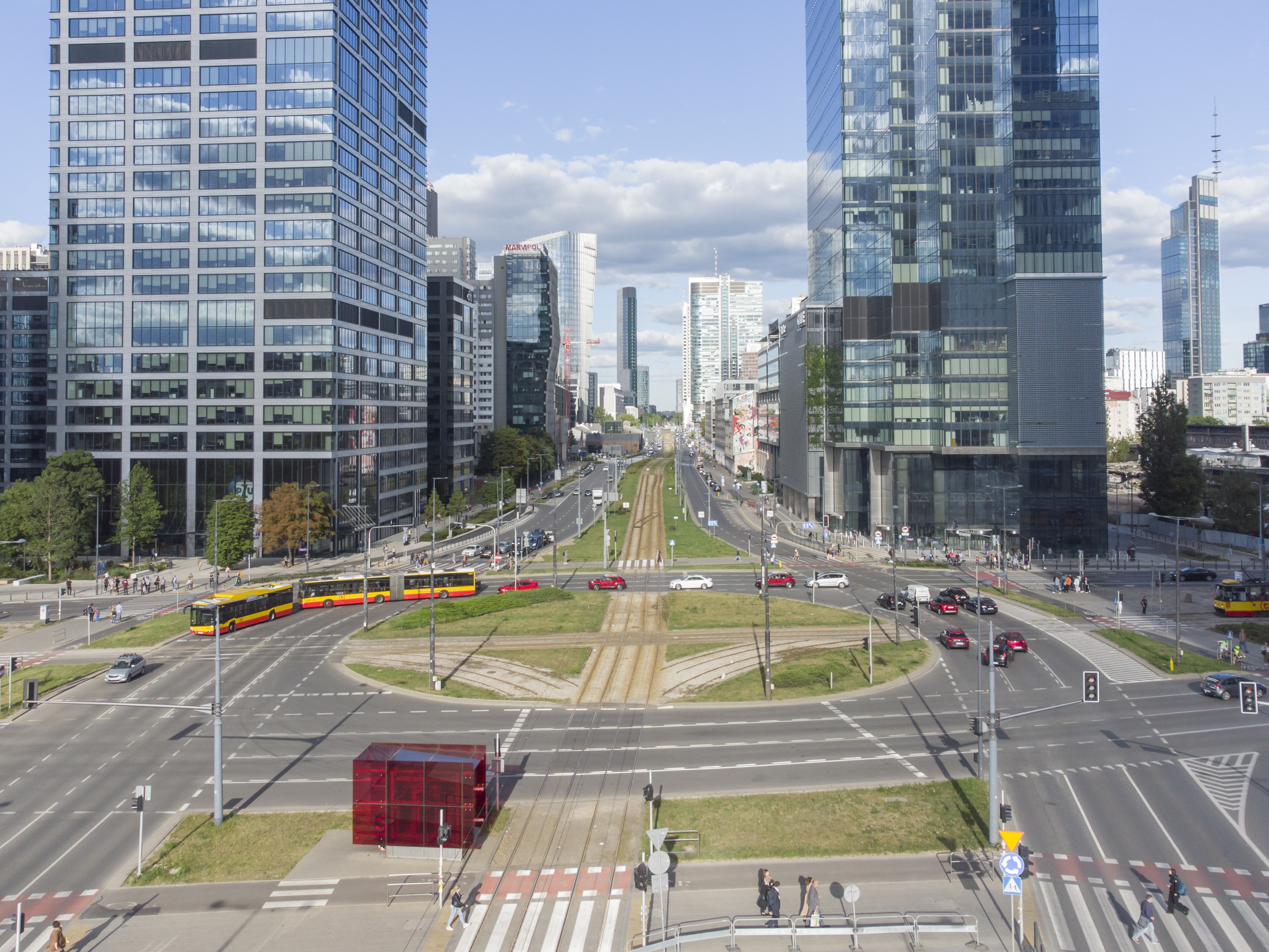
- Rondo Daszyńskiego

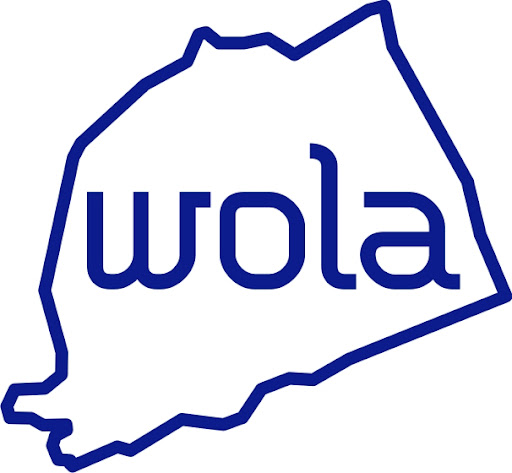
- Brandmark

- Location of Wola within Warsaw

- Neighbourhoods of Wola
- Country: Poland
- Voivodeship: Masovian
- County/City: Warsaw

Government
  - Mayor: Krzysztof Strzałkowski

Area
  - Total: 19.26 km^{2} (7.44 sq mi)

Population (2019)
  - Total: 140,958
  - Density: 7,319/km^{2} (18,960/sq mi)
- Time zone: UTC+1 (CET)
  - Summer (DST): UTC+2 (CEST)
- Area code: +48 22
- Car plates: WY
- Website: wola.um.warszawa.pl

Wola (Polish pronunciation: [ˈvɔla]) is a district in western Warsaw, Poland. An industrial area with traditions reaching back to the early 19th century, it underwent a transformation into a major financial district, featuring various landmarks and some of the tallest office buildings in the city.

== History ==
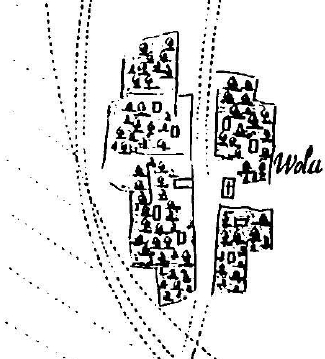
Village of Wola in 1705, St. Lawrence's Church in the middle

Village Wielka Wola was first mentioned in the 14th century. It became the site of the elections, from 1573 to 1764, of Polish kings by the szlachta (nobility) of the Polish–Lithuanian Commonwealth. The Wola district later became famous for the Polish Army's defence of Warsaw in 1794 during the Kościuszko Uprising and in 1831 during the November Uprising, when Józef Sowiński and Józef Bem defended the city against Tsarist forces.

In the 17th century, the jurydyki of Wielopole, Leszno, Nowolipie and Grzybów were established, which were incorporated into Warsaw in 1791, and today are wholly or partly within the boundaries of the Wola district.

In the 19th century, Wola developed as a factory and workers' district. During the 1905 revolution, a May Day march led by Felix Dzerzhinsky ended in clashes with the police, resulting in 25 deaths.

The village of Wielka Wola was incorporated into Warsaw in 1916.

During the Warsaw Uprising (August–October 1944), fierce battles raged in Wola. Around 8 August, Wola was the scene of the largest single massacre by German forces in Poland, of 40,000 to 50,000 civilians. The area was held by Polish fighters belonging to the Armia Krajowa.

Wola is currently divided into the neighbourhoods of Czyste, Koło, Mirów, Młynów, Nowolipki, Odolany, Powązki and Ulrychów, which in many cases correspond to old villages or settlements.

== Skyscrapers ==
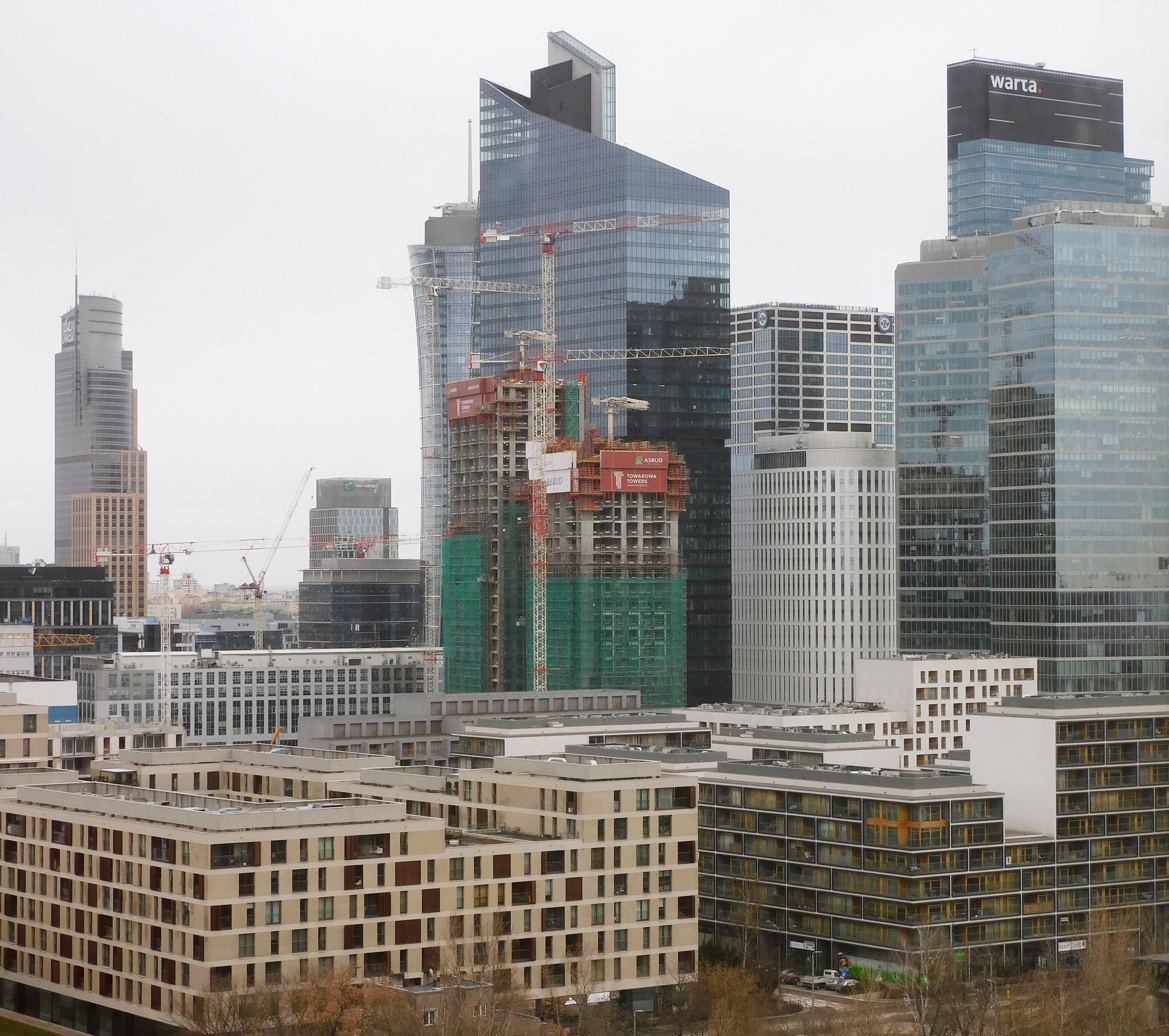
High-rise buildings, including the Towarowa Towers under construction in the centre

Numerous office and residential high-rises of up to 53 stories have been built in Wola since the 1990s. Most of them are concentrated along the Towarowa and Prosta streets; these include Varso Tower (310 m (1,020 ft)), Warsaw Spire (220 m (720 ft)), Warsaw Unit (202 m (663 ft)), Skyliner (195 m (640 ft)), Warsaw Trade Tower (187 m (614 ft)), The Warsaw Hub (130 m (430 ft) x2), Łucka City (120 m (390 ft)), Ilmet (103 m (338 ft)) and Warta Tower (82 m (269 ft)).

Many other buildings rising over 100 metres (330 ft) are currently undergoing construction in Wola, such as the office skyscrapers The Bridge (174 m (571 ft)) and Skyliner II (130 m (430 ft)), the Towarowa 22 complex ((150 m (490 ft), (120 m (390 ft) and (110 m (360 ft)), and the residential Towarowa Towers (105 m (344 ft) x2).

== Historic landmarks ==
- St. Lawrence's Church - built 1695–1755
- Church of St Charles Borromeo - designed by Enrico Marconi, built 1841–1849 in Renaissance Revival style
- Krongold Tenement House - built 1896–1899
- Church of St. Adalbert - designed by Józef Pius Dziekoński, built 1898–1903 in Gothic Revival style
- St. John Climacus's Orthodox Church - built 1903–1905 in Russian Revival style
- PDT Wola - department store built 1949–1956
- Za Żelazną Bramą housing estate - housing estate built 1965–72, inspired by the Unité d'habitation
- Warsaw Rising Museum - established in 2004 in the buildings of the former tram power station (built 1905–1909)
- Norblin - shopping and entertainment complex on the site of the former Norblin factory
- Electio Viritim Monument - monument in the area where Polish Kings were elected during 1575-1764 period in the Polish-Lithuanian Commonwealth
- Keret House - art installation described as the narrowest house in the world
- Powązki Cemetery
- Warsaw Insurgents Cemetery
- Sikorski Palace, housing the Wola Museum

=== Gallery ===
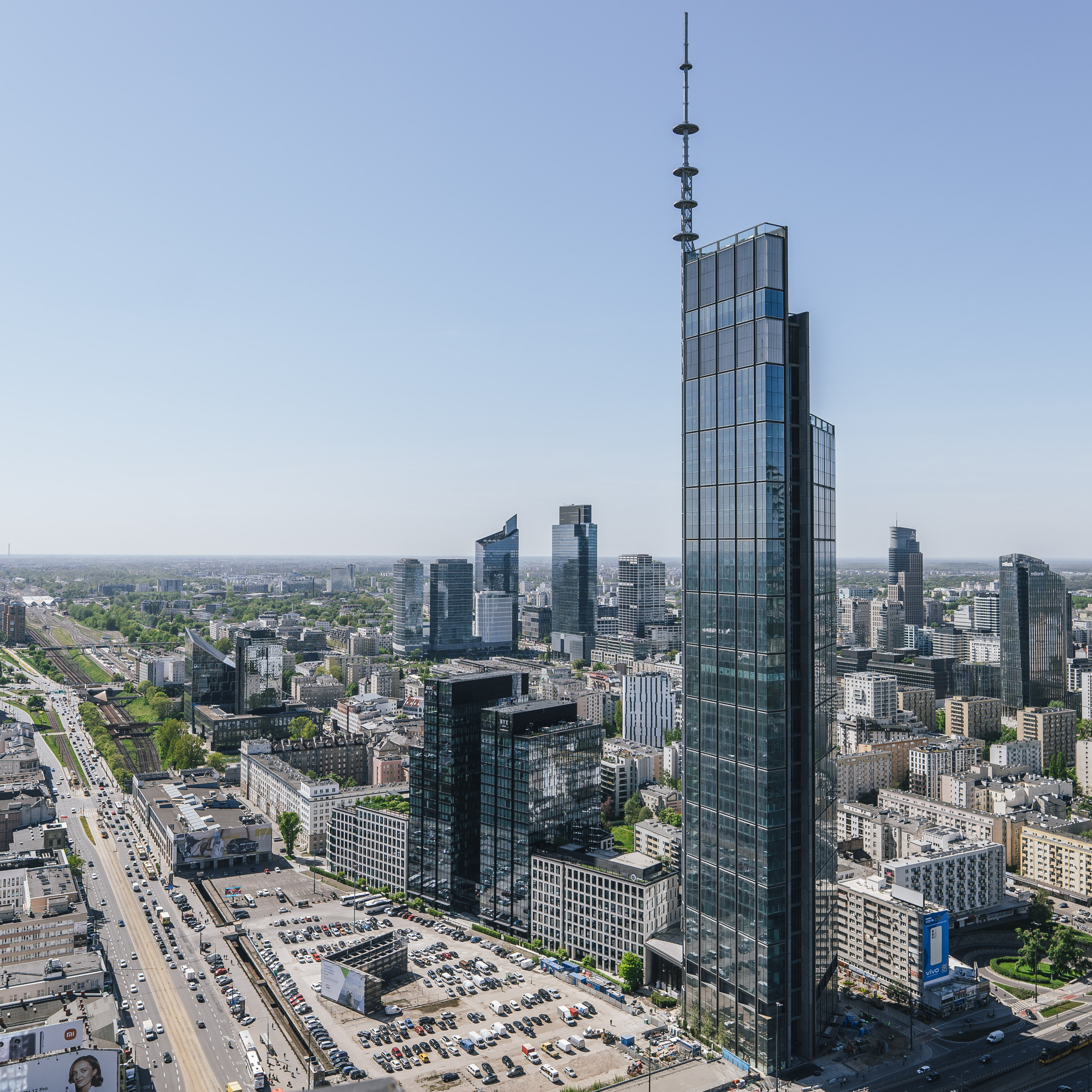
Varso

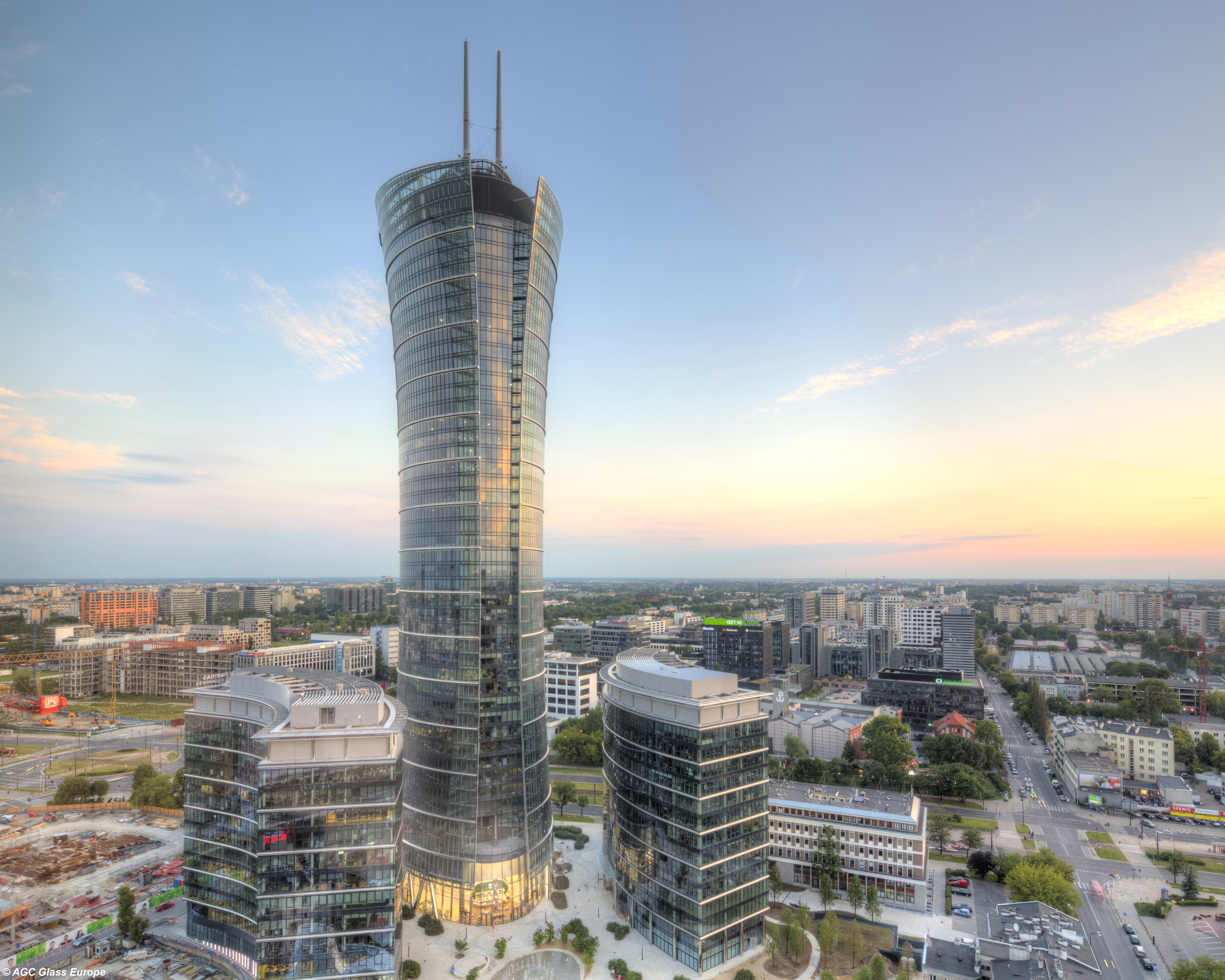
Warsaw Spire

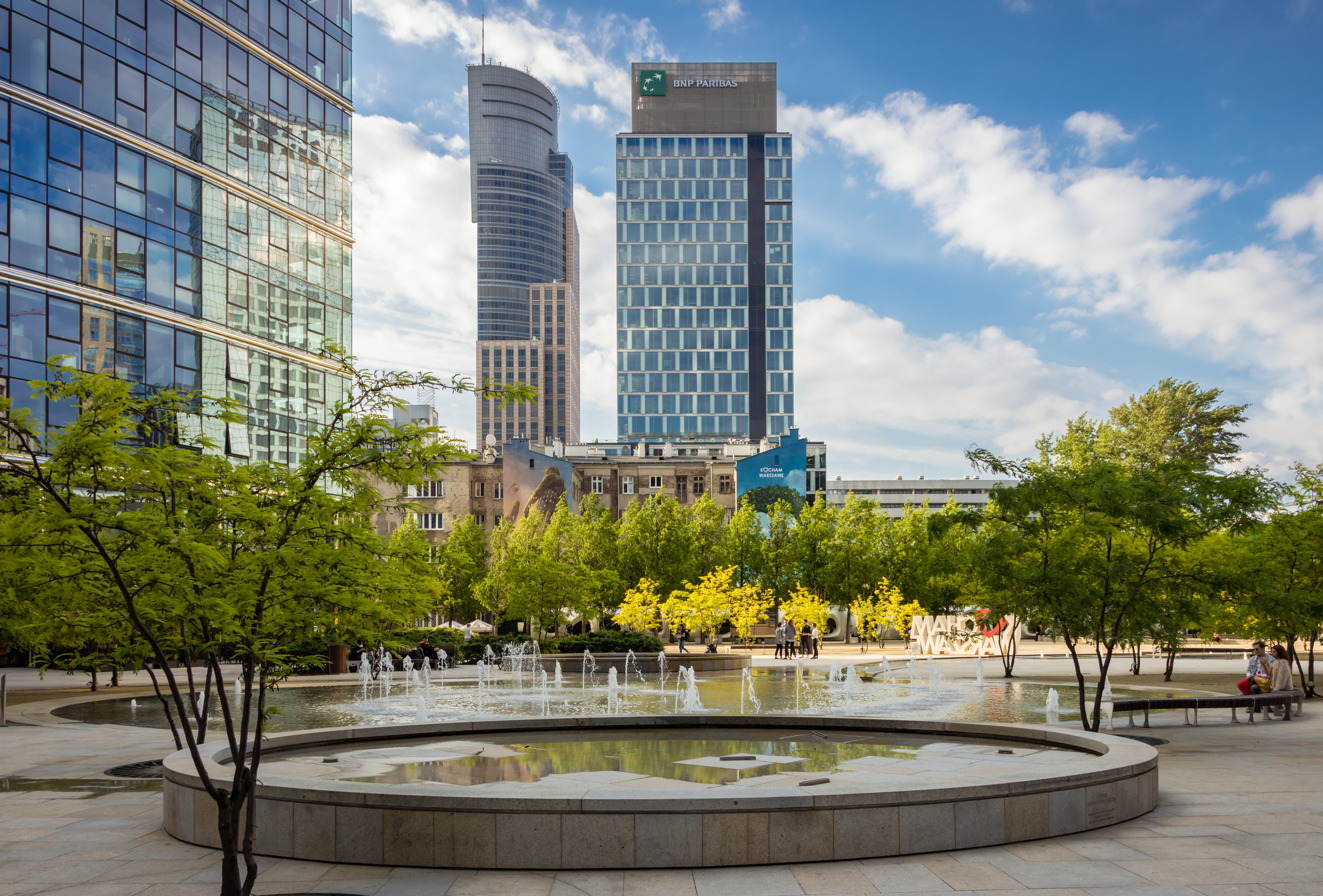
Plac Europejski - public green space near Warsaw Spire

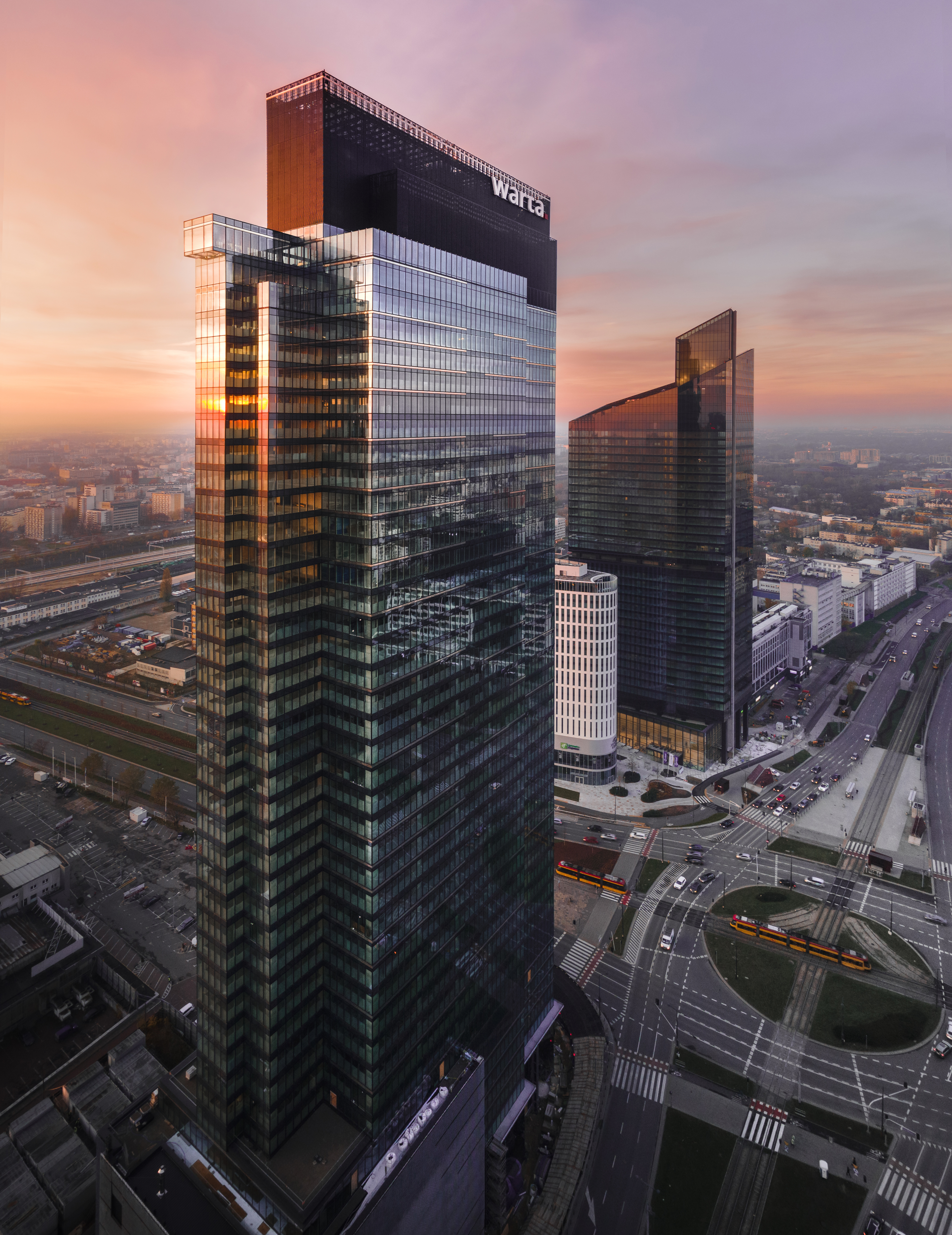
Warsaw Unit

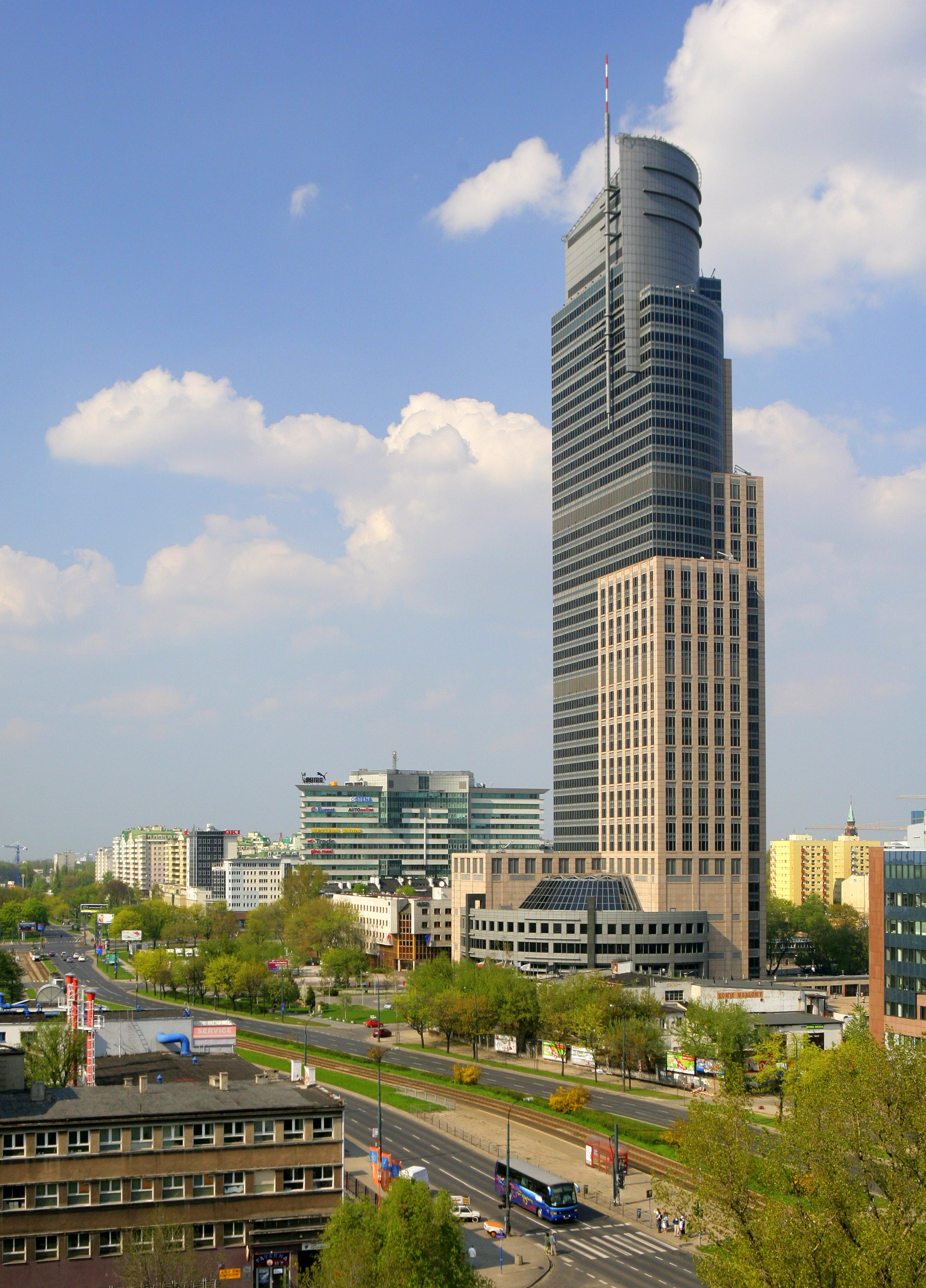
Warsaw Trade Tower

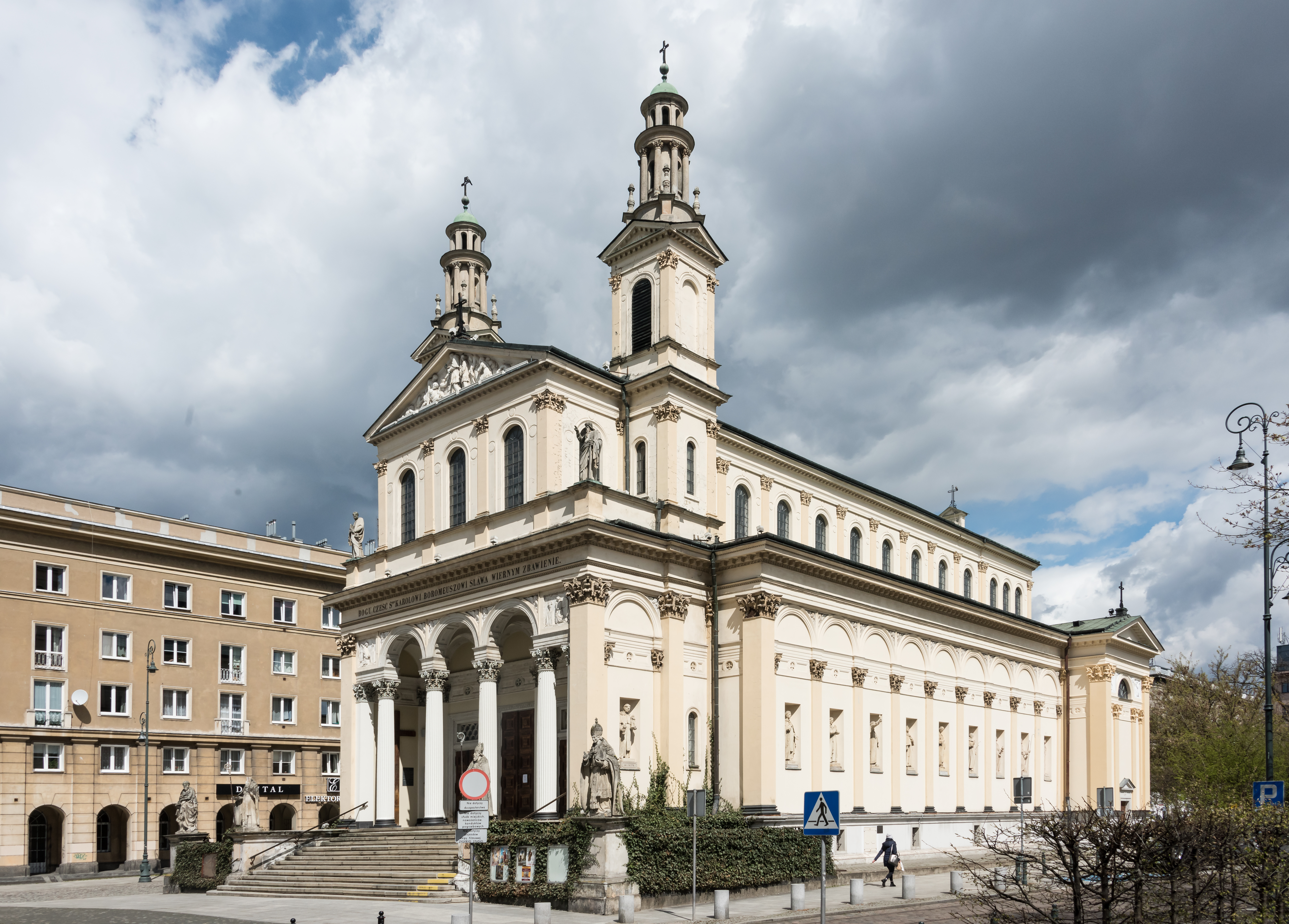
Church of St Charles Borromeo

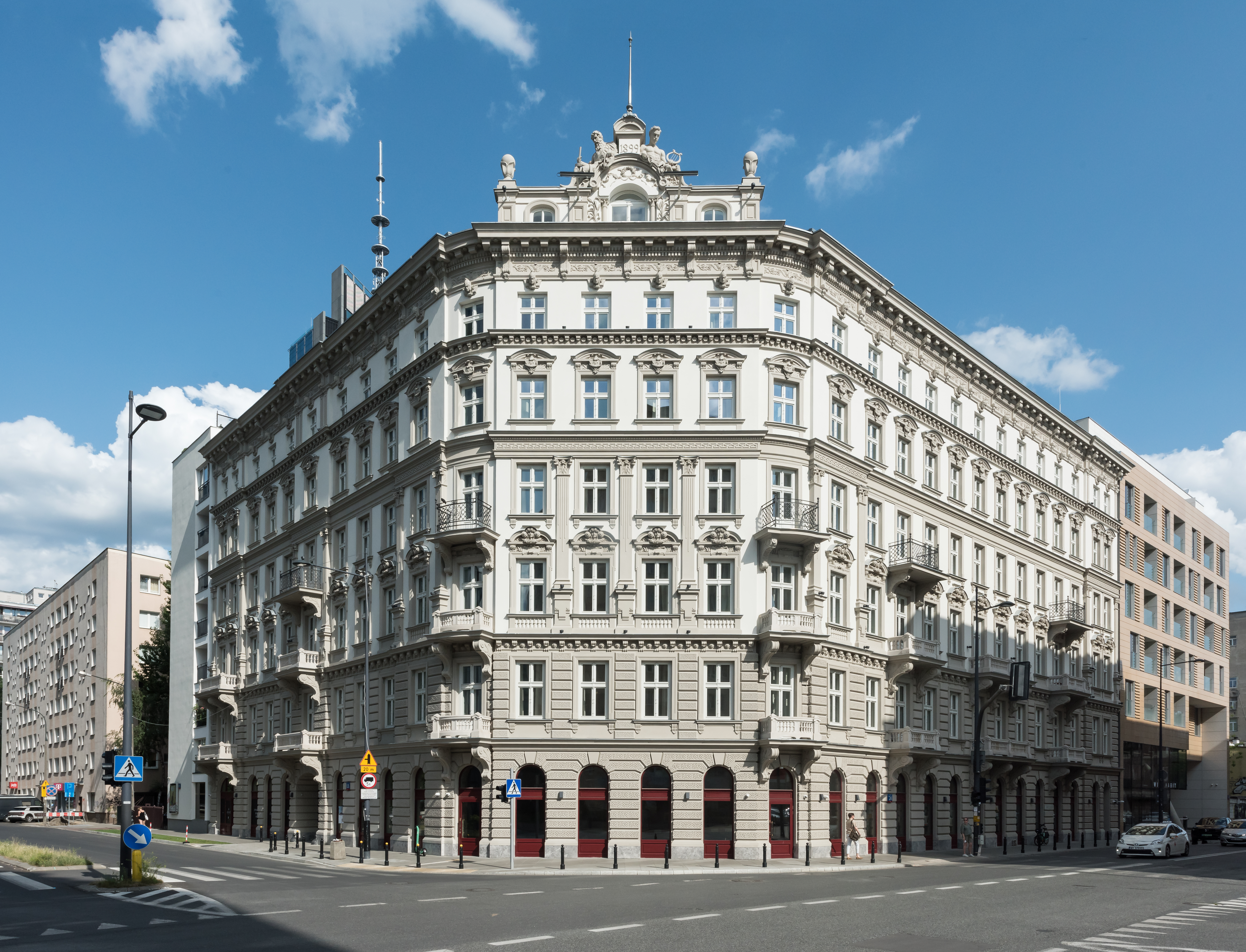
Krongold Tenement House

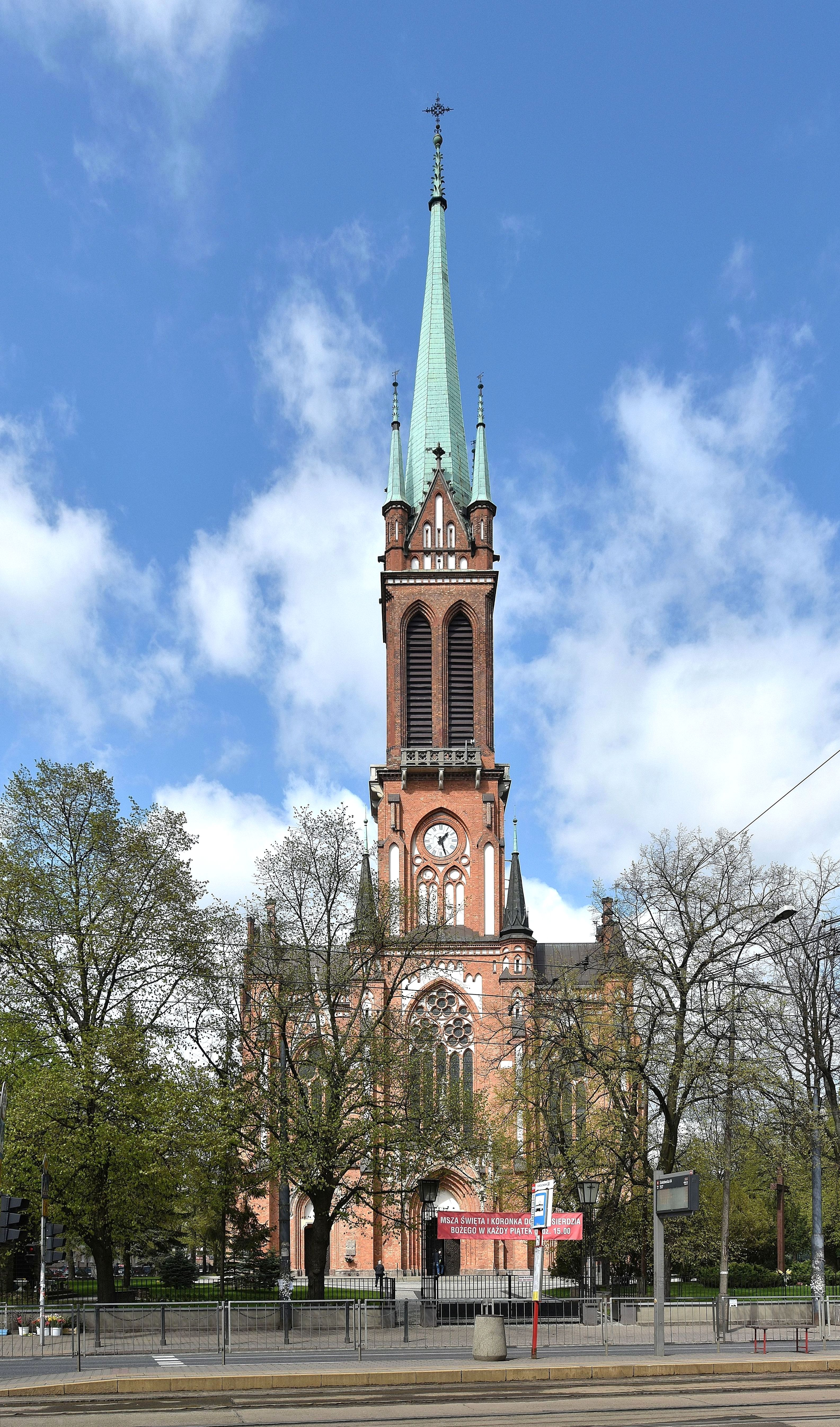
Church of St. Adalbert

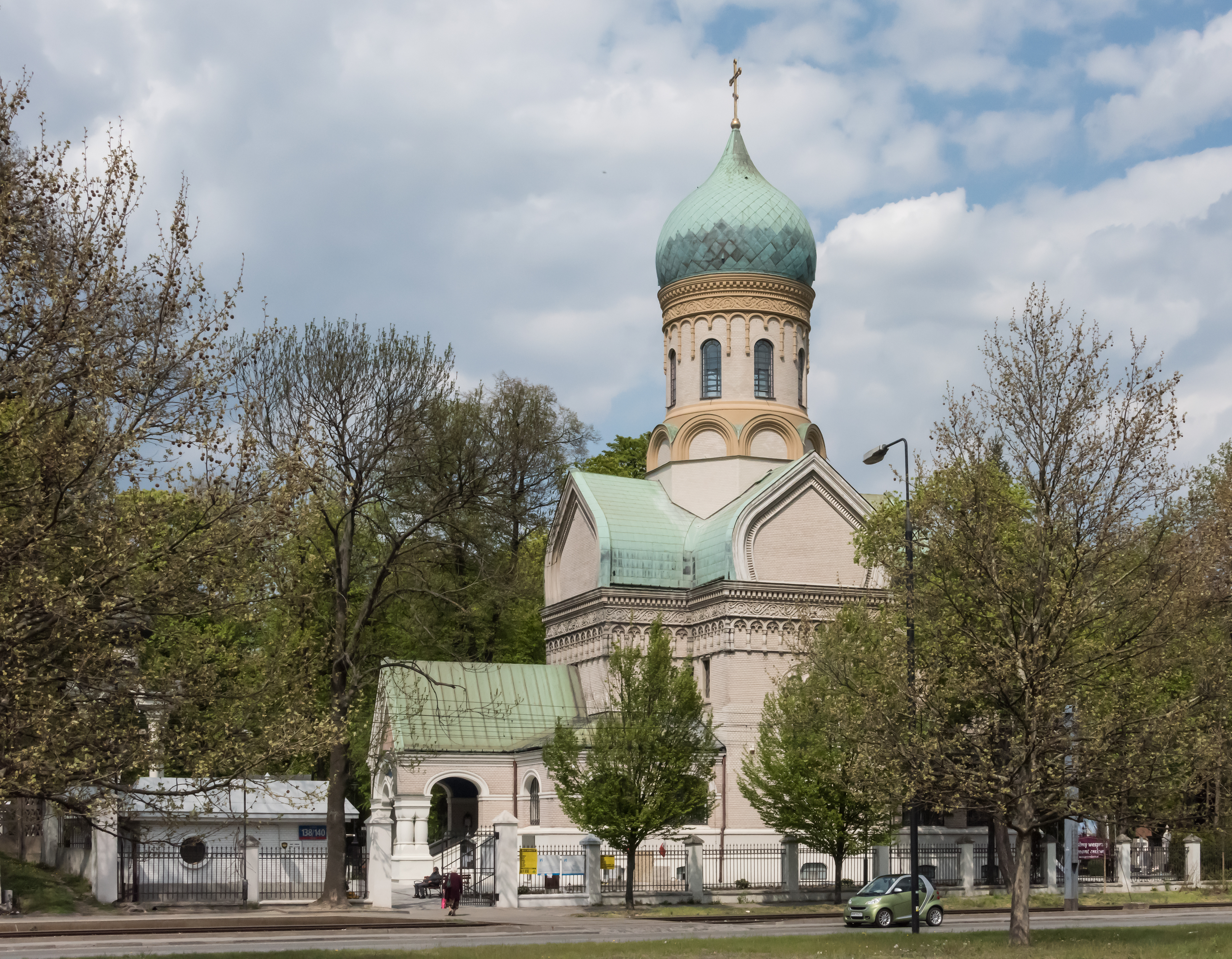
St. John Climacus's Orthodox Church

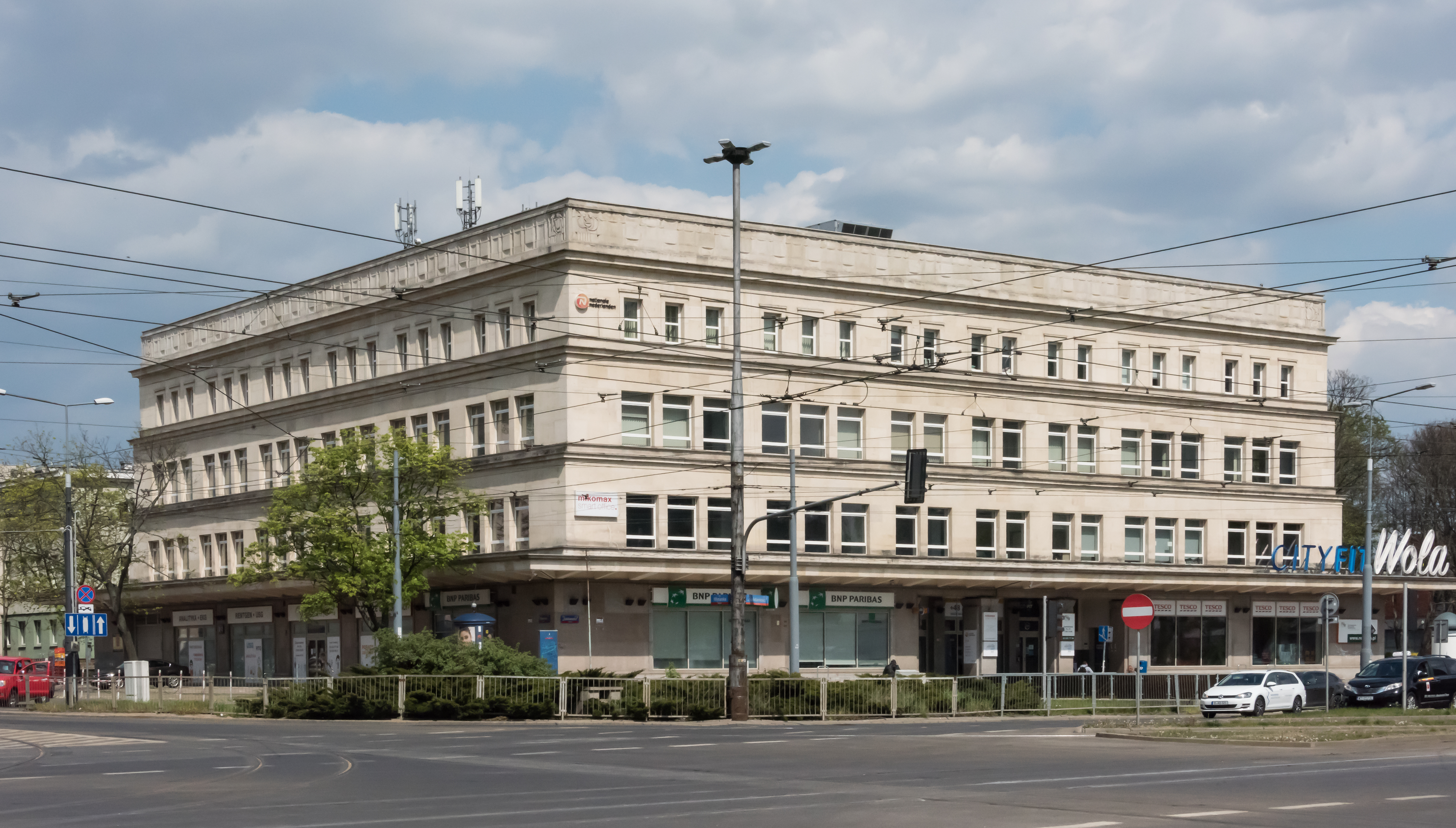
PDT Wola department store

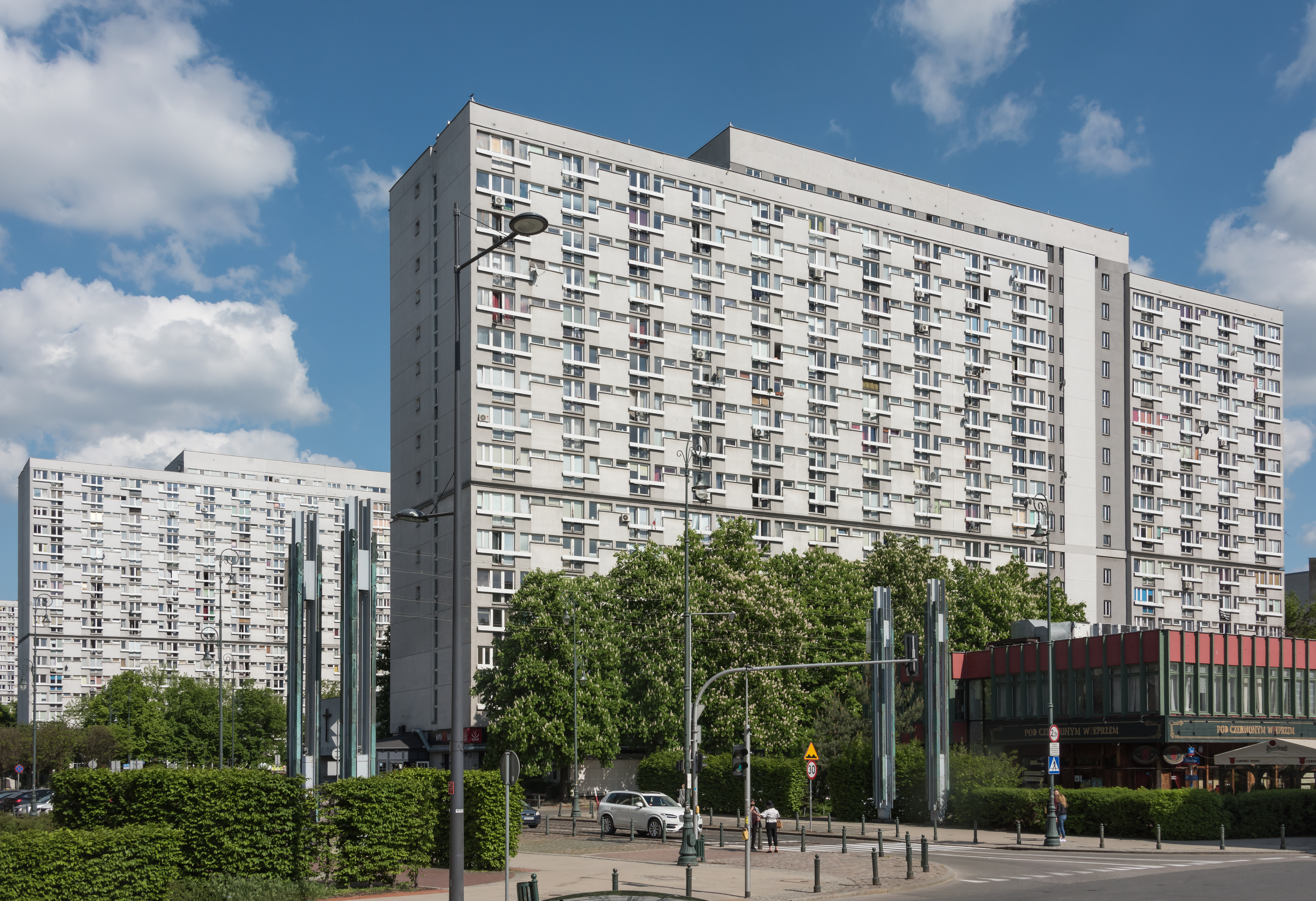
Za Żelazną Bramą housing estate

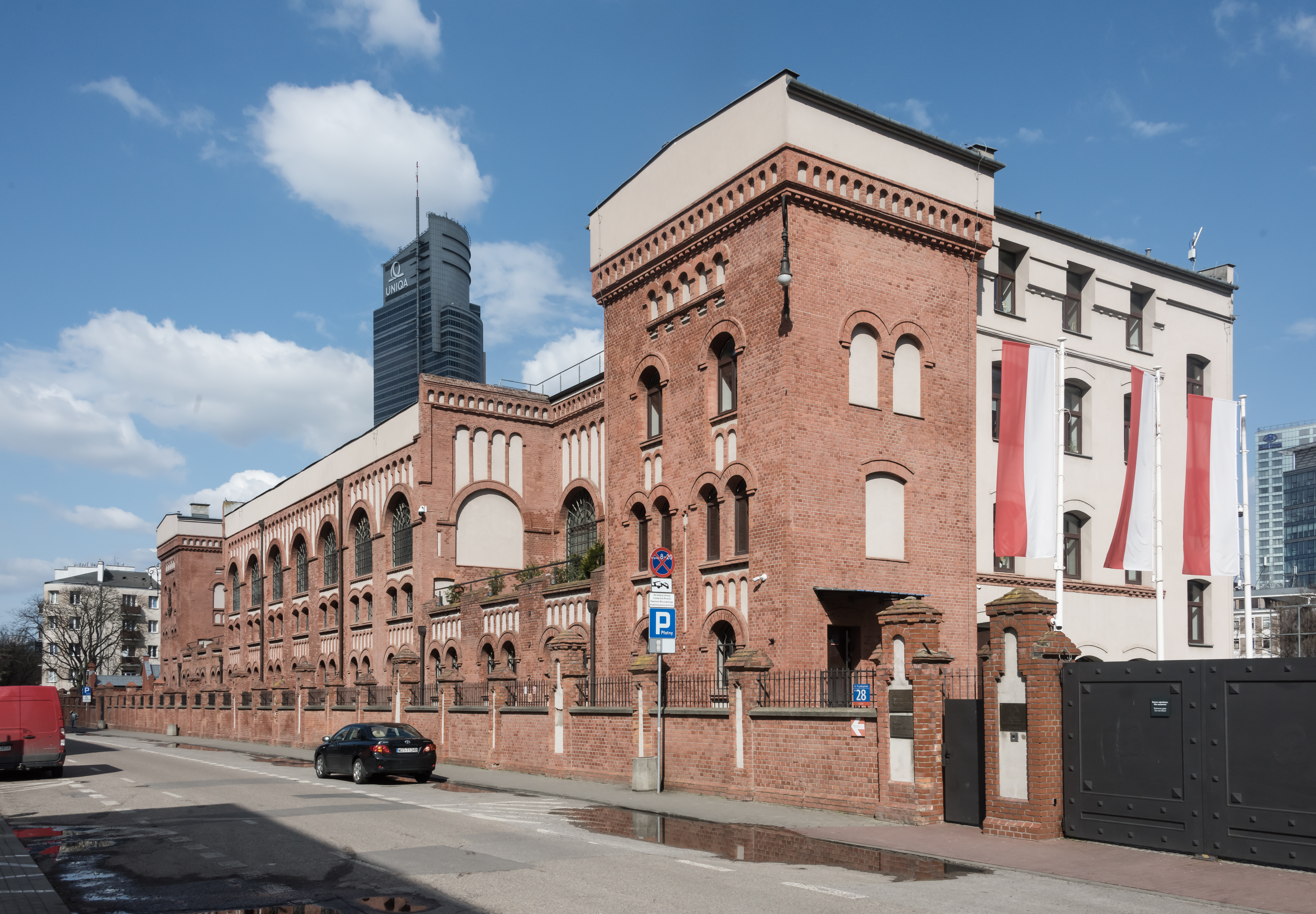
Former tram power station, now Warsaw Rising Museum

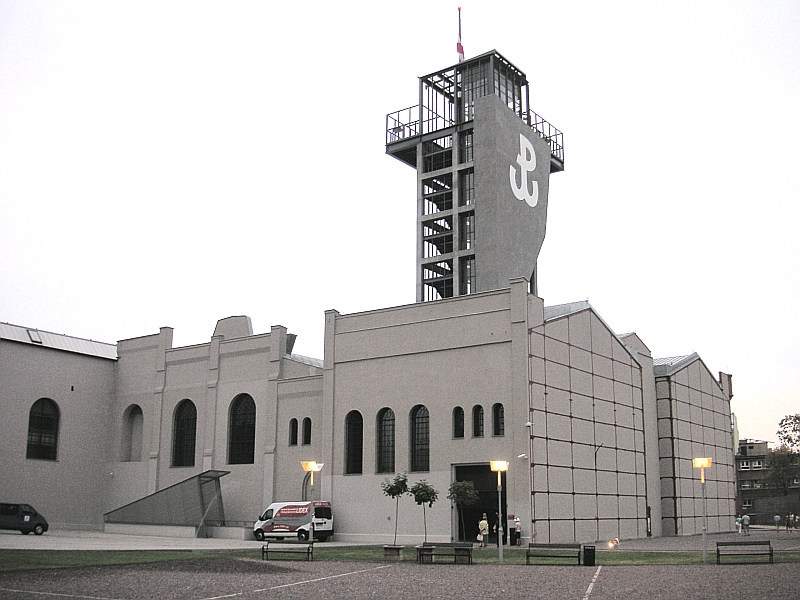
Warsaw Rising Museum

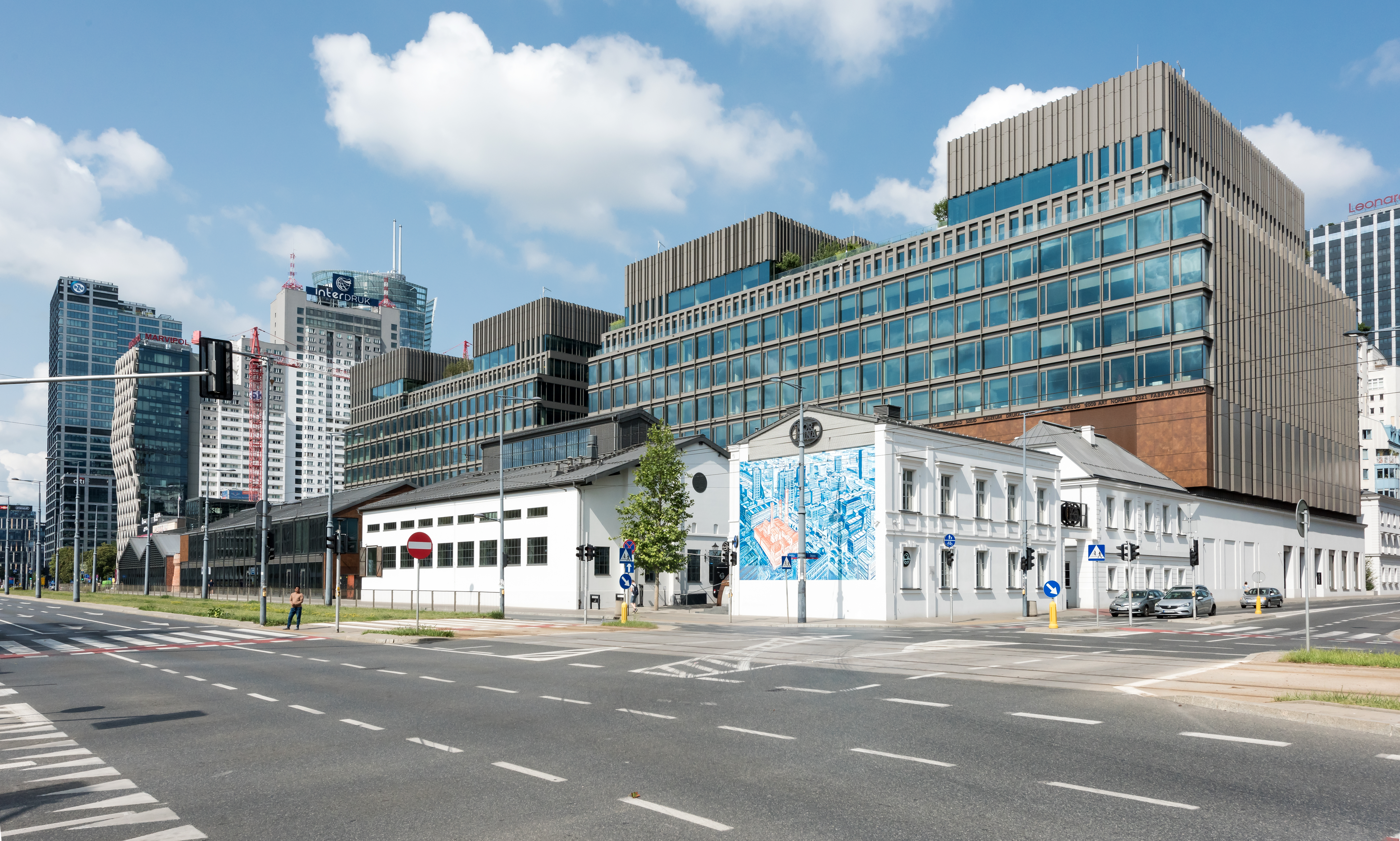
Former Norblin factory, now shopping and entertainment complex

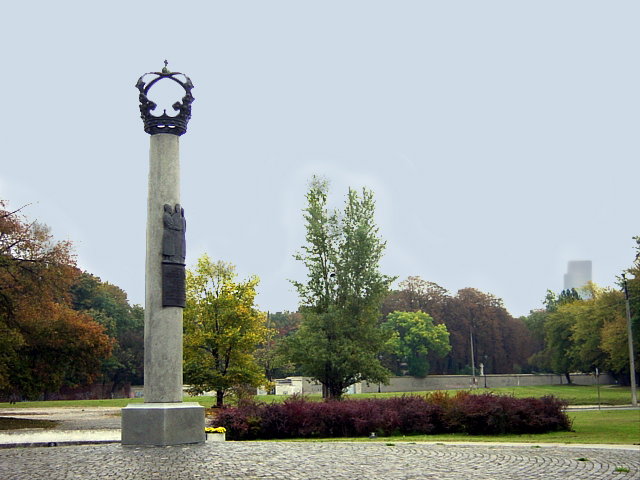
Electio Viritim Monument

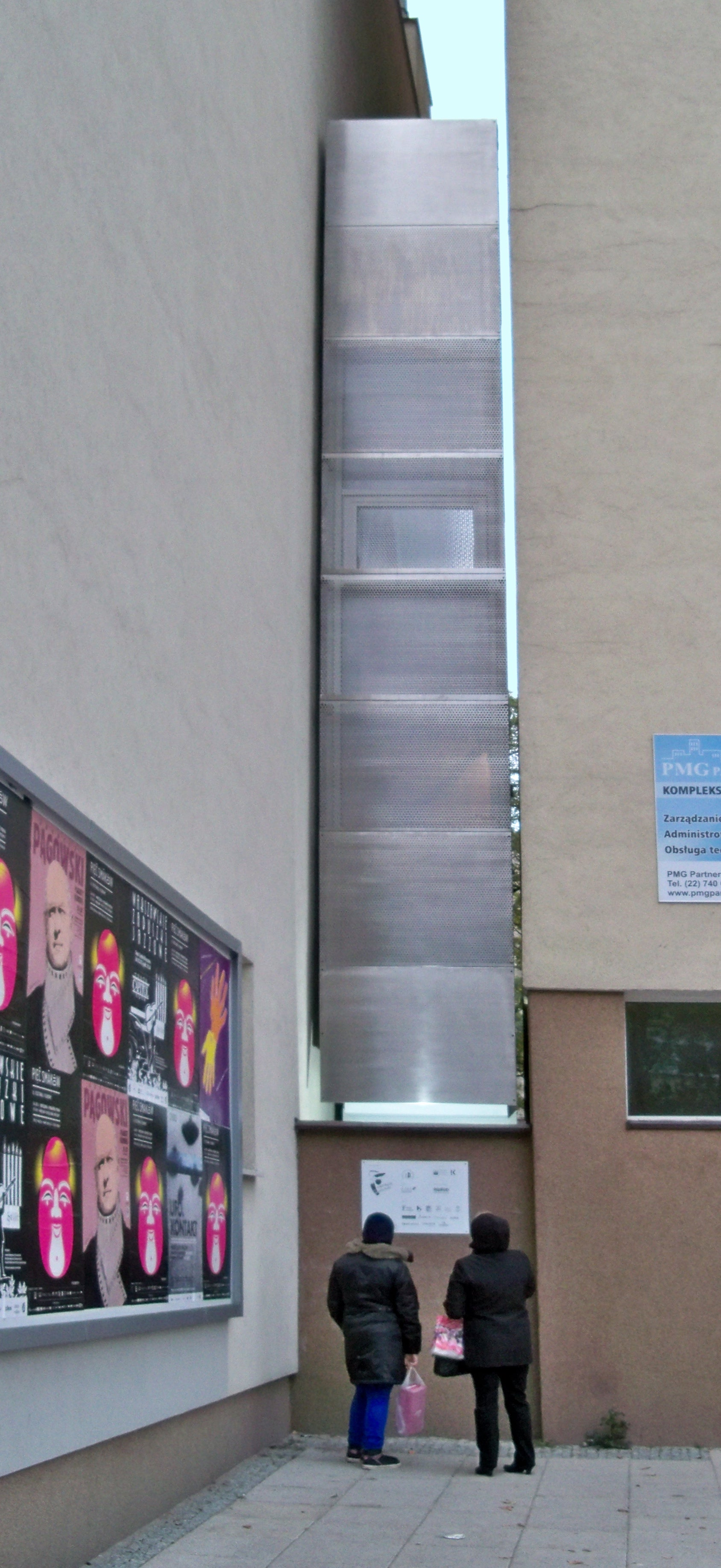
Keret House

== See also ==
- Defense of Ochota and Wola (1939)
