= Electio Viritim Monument =

Monument in Warsaw, Poland

- Kolumna Electio Viritim
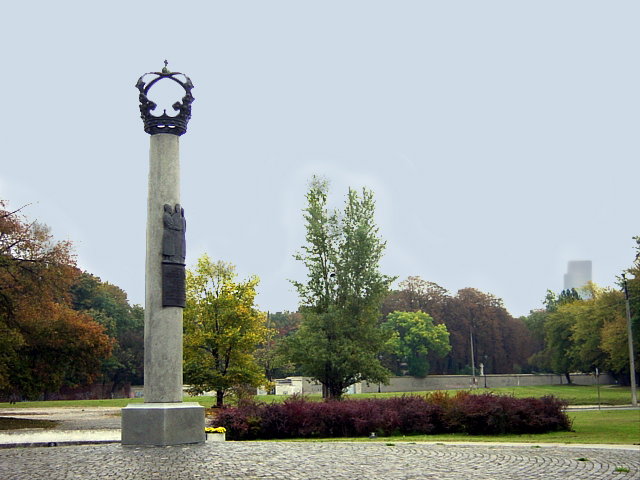
- Interactive map of Electio Viritim Monument
- Location: Ul. Ostroroga, Wola, Warsaw
- Coordinates: 52.2438°N 20.9679°E
- Designer: Stanisław Michalik
- Completion date: 19 June 1997
- Dedicated to: Royal elections in Poland

The Electio Viritim Monument is located in Wola, Warsaw, in the area where Polish Kings were elected during the 1575-1764 period in the Polish-Lithuanian Commonwealth.

== Inscription ==
Obelisk
Electio Viritim
wzniesiony w 400-lecie
stołeczności Warszawy
na dawnym
polu elekcyjnym
w miejscu
szopy senatorskiej
i koła rycerskiego
gdzie w latach 1575–1764
obrano 10 królów Polski
Towarzystwo Przyjaciół Warszawy
Oddział Wola
1997 r.
