= The Warsaw Hub =

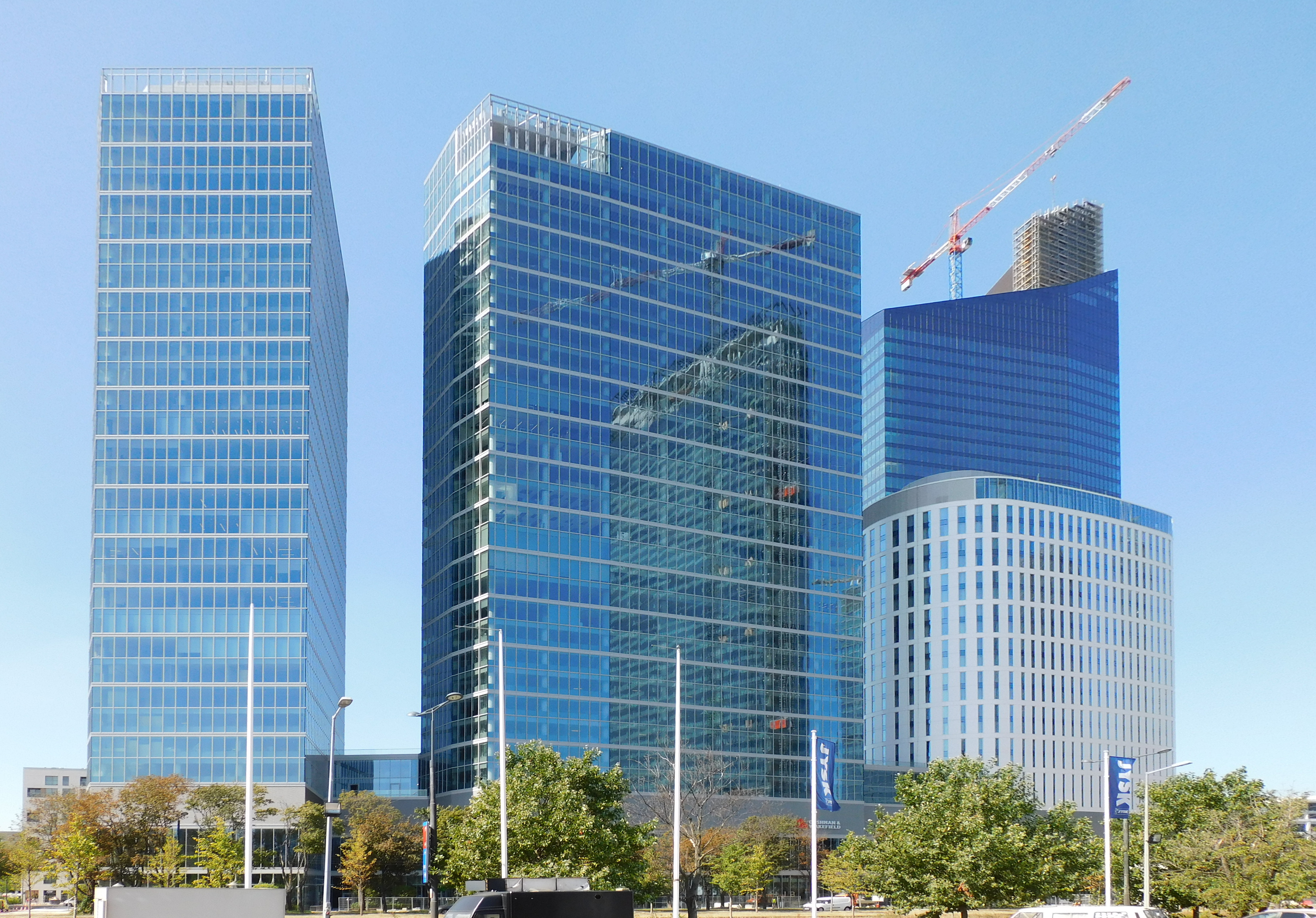
- Interactive map of the The Warsaw Hub area
- Former names: Sienna Towers

General information
- Status: Completed
- Type: mixed-use
- Location: Warsaw, Poland
- Coordinates: 52°13′45″N 20°59′04″E
- Construction started: 2016
- Completed: 2020

Height
- Architectural: 130 m (430 ft)
- Roof: 130 m (430 ft)

Technical details
- Floor count: 31
- Floor area: 113,000 m^{2} (1,220,000 sq ft)

Design and construction
- Architect: AMC – Andrzej M. Chołdzyński
- Developer: Ghelamco

Other information
- Public transit access: Rondo Daszynskiego

The Warsaw Hub, previously known as Sienna Towers, is a complex of mixed-use buildings constructed by Belgian real estate developer Ghelamco in Warsaw, Poland. It consists of two 130-meter tall high-rises and an 86-meter building totalling around 113 thousand square meters. Construction started in the first quarter of 2016 and was completed by mid 2020, at a cost of 1 billion zlotys.

The complex was sold to Google in 2022 for around 583M euros.

== Warsaw Hub fire ==
On 7 June 2019, a fire broke out on floors 27–32 of one of the unfinished towers. 130 firefighters participated in the operation, nobody was injured. The following inspection found no damage to the structure of the building.

== See also ==
- List of tallest buildings in Poland
