= Warsaw Unit =

Skyscraper in Warsaw, Poland

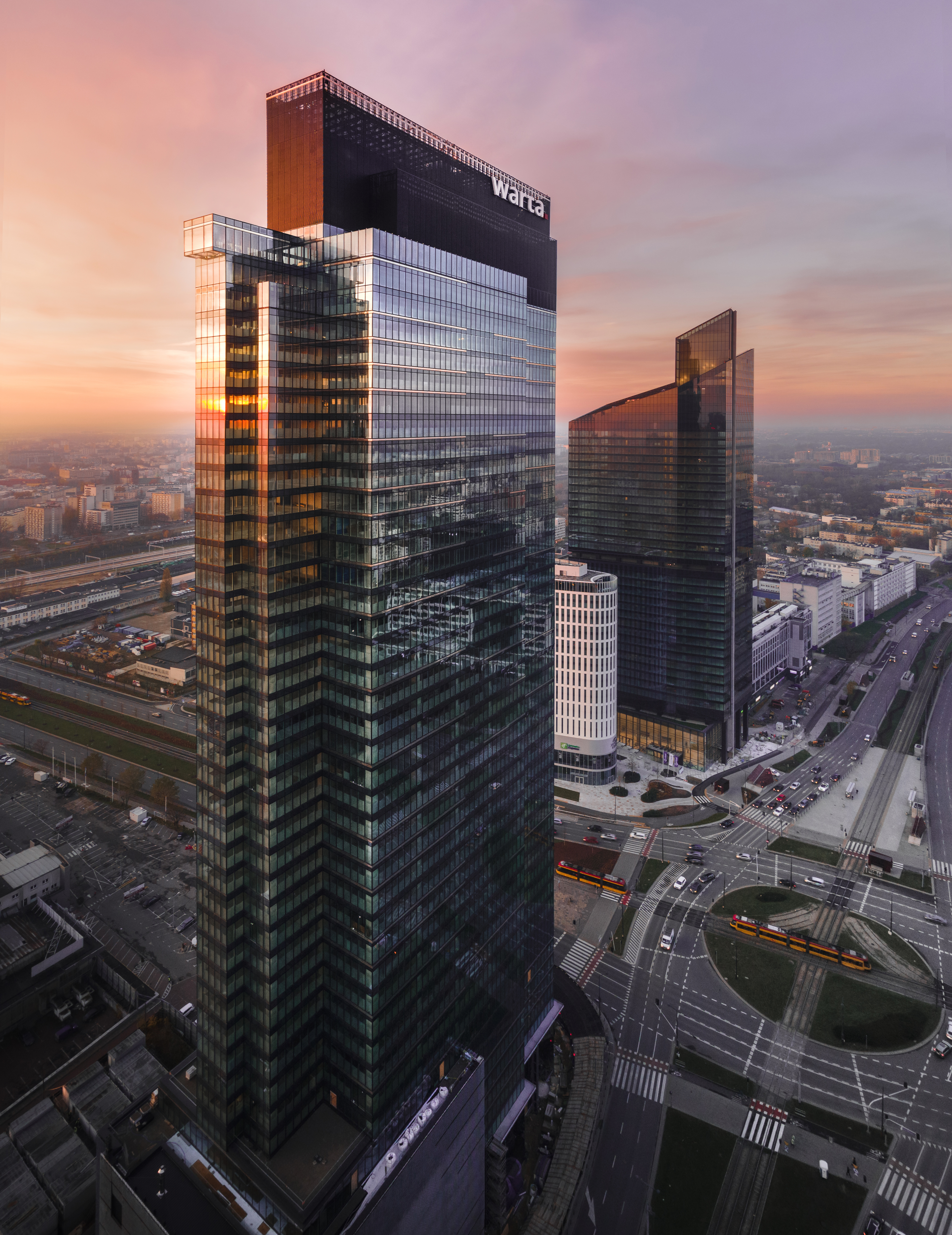
- Warsaw Unit in 2020
- Interactive map of the Warsaw Unit area

General information
- Status: Completed
- Type: Office
- Location: Warsaw, Poland, 1 Daszyński Roundabout (Note: Some sources list nearby 112, Pańska Street, Warsaw as its address instead.)
- Coordinates: 52°13′48.94″N 20°59′9.52″E
- Construction started: 2017
- Completed: 2021

Height
- Architectural: 202 metres (663 ft)
- Tip: 202 metres (663 ft)
- Roof: 180 metres (590 ft)

Technical details
- Floor count: 46
- Floor area: 59,000 m^{2} (640,000 sq ft)

Design and construction
- Architecture firm: Projekt Polsko-Belgijska Pracownia Architektury
- Developer: Ghelamco

Website
- warsawunit.com

Warsaw Unit is a skyscraper in the city of Warsaw, Poland. It is located at the 1 Daszyński Roundabout, (Note: Some sources list nearby 112, Pańska Street, Warsaw as its address instead.) in the district of Wola, within the neighbourhood of Mirów. It was opened in 2021.

== Name ==
According to the developing company, Ghelamco, the name Warsaw Unit is an homage to the Unité d'habitation (Housing Unit), a modernist residential housing typology developed by Le Corbusier. The name is also alternatively spelled as Warsaw UNIT. Formerly, until November 2018, the building was known as Spinnaker.

== Design and technical details ==
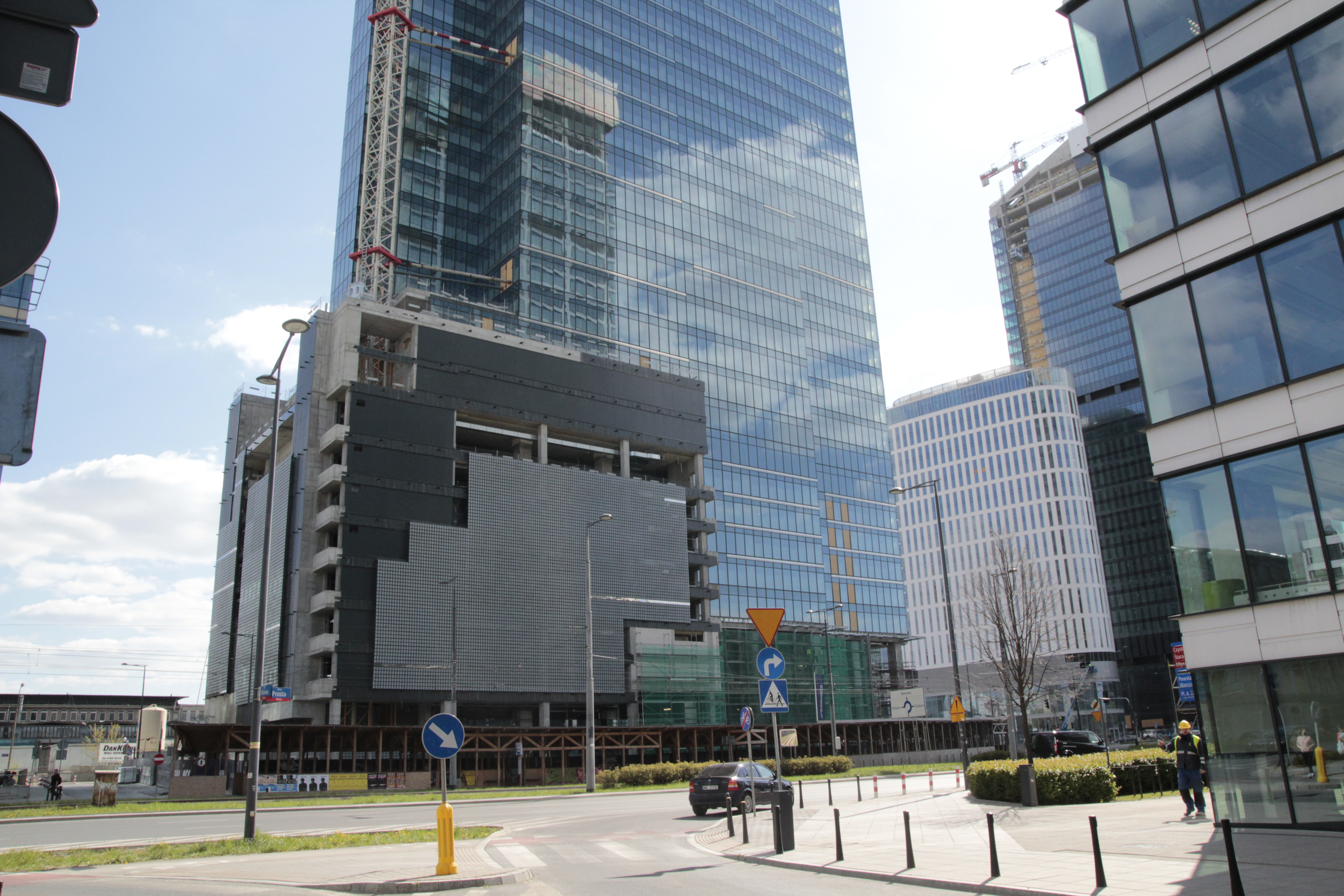
Warsaw Unit under construction in 2020, including its Dragon Skin-type kinetic facade

The building has 46 storeys Its height from the base to the roof, equals 180 m (590.55 ft), and its total height, including the technical equipment on the roof, equals 202 m (662.73 ft.). With its total height, it is the 5th tallest building in the city, and the 6th tallest building in Poland. When including only its height to the roof, it is the 7th tallest building in the city, and 8th in Poland.

The building has 59 000 m^{2} (635 070 sq ft) of floor area, including an office area of 57 000 m^{2} (613 543 sq ft), and 300 m^{2} (3229 sq ft) of commercial and service area. It has 14 elevators, and 456 car parks.

The portion of the building elevation had been covered with Dragon Skin-type kinetic facade, consisting of thousands of moving plate, which move in the wind, forming illusions of images on building walls. It is the first time such elevation had been used in the building in Poland.The last storey includes terrace encased with glass walls.

== History ==
The construction of the building had been financed by Ghelamco Group, and it was designed by the architectural firm of Projekt Polsko-Belgijska Pracownia Architektury. The building had been constructed on the small plot of land, on which was previously located historical tenement, located at 112 Pańska Street, near the Daszyński Roundabout between Prosta, Pańska, and Wronia Streets. Its construction began in April 2017 and was finished in March 2021.

In November 2024 the building has been sold to Eastnine

== See also ==
- List of tallest buildings in Poland
