= Warsaw Spire =

Office complex in Warsaw, Poland

Coordinates: 52°13′59″N 20°59′5″E

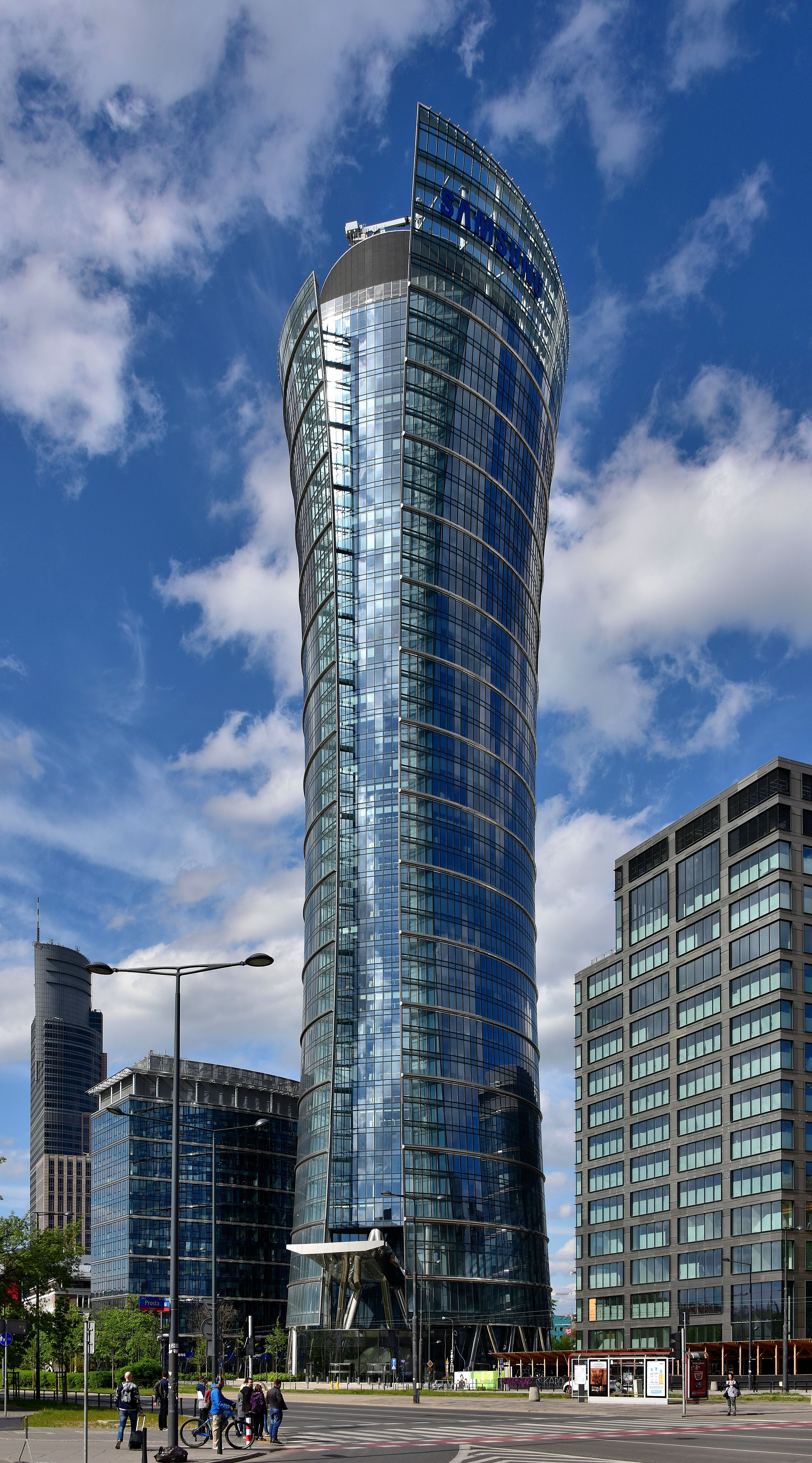
- Warsaw Spire in 2019
- Interactive map of the Warsaw Spire area

General information
- Status: Completed
- Type: Office
- Architectural style: Neomodern
- Location: Warsaw, Poland, Plac Europejski 1, 2, 6
- Construction started: 2011
- Topped-out: April 2015
- Completed: 2016
- Opening: 12 May 2016

Height
- Architectural: 220 metres (720 ft)
- Tip: 220 metres (720 ft)
- Roof: 180 metres (590 ft)

Technical details
- Floor count: 49
- Floor area: 129,336 m^{2} (1,392,160 sq ft)

Design and construction
- Architecture firm: Jaspers-Eyers Architects; Projekt Polsko-Belgijska Pracownia Architektury
- Developer: Ghelamco

Website
- warsawspire.pl

The Warsaw Spire is a complex of neomodern office buildings in Warsaw, Poland, constructed by the Belgian real estate developer Ghelamco.

== Description ==
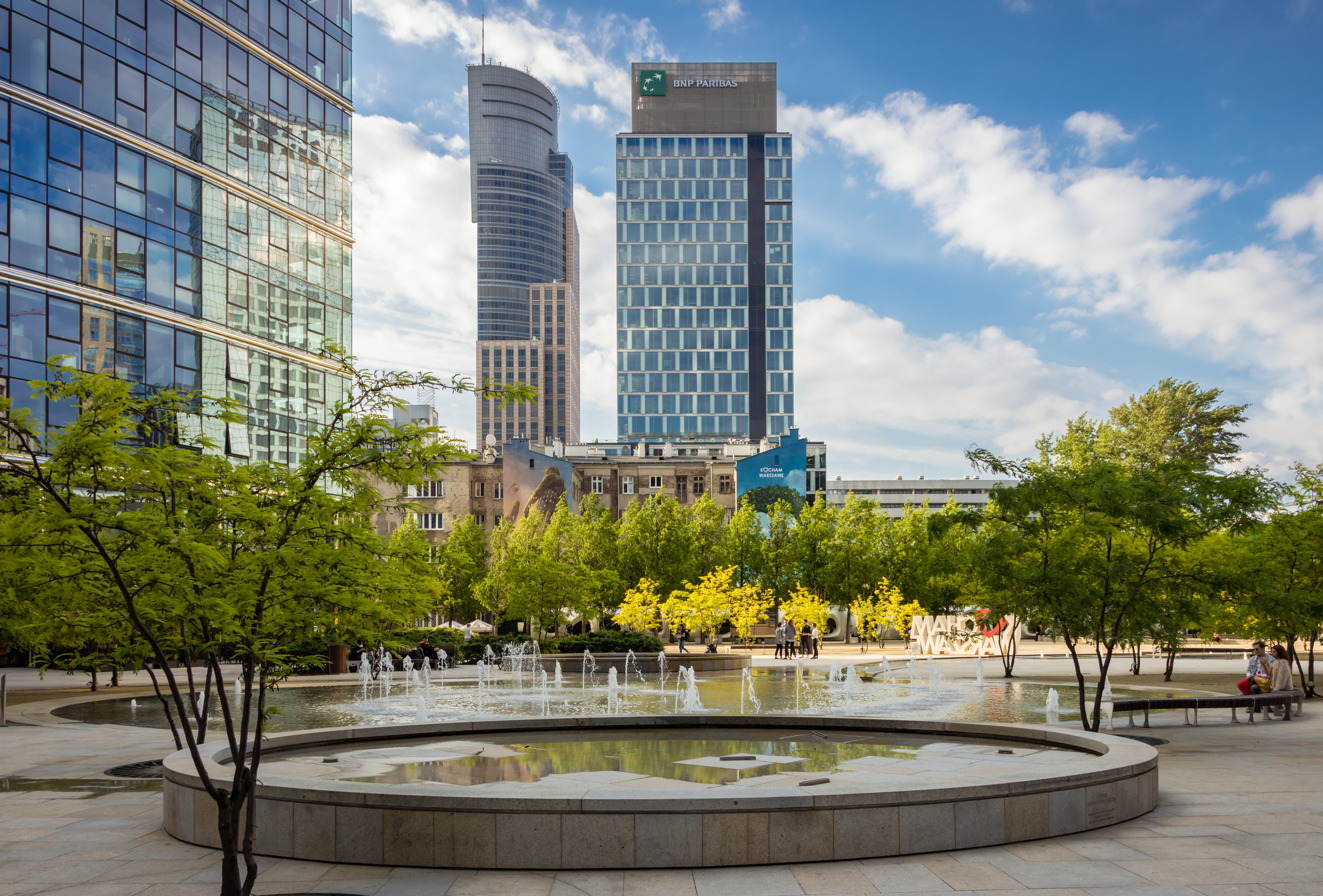
Surrounding of the complex at Plac Europejski

Located in the Wola district of Warsaw, the complex consists of a 220-metre main tower with a hyperboloid glass façade, Warsaw Spire A, and two 55-metre auxiliary buildings, Warsaw Spire B and C. The main tower is the third tallest building in Poland (after the Varso Tower and the Palace of Culture and Science).

The design of the skyscraper and adjacent buildings was developed by the Belgian architectural studio Jaspers-Eyers Architects, in cooperation with the Polish-Belgian Projekt Polsko-Belgijska Pracownia Architektury. Surrounding the buildings there is a large open plaza, featuring green areas and water elements.

The European Border and Coast Guard Agency (FRONTEX) is headquartered in the Warsaw Spire B.

== Construction ==
Construction works began in mid-2011 with the installation of diaphragm walls on five underground floors, where a parking lot was built. On 3 July 2014, a fire broke out on the roof of one of the lower buildings of the complex, causing not much damage.

In December 2014, a large neon sign with the words Kocham Warszawę ("I love Warsaw") was installed by Belgian creative lighting and visual design practice Painting with Light and placed on the upper floors of the partially constructed main tower. In April 2015, after the assembly of the spires, the skyscraper reached its maximum height of 220 metres. A topping out event was held at the Warsaw Spire on 24 April 2015.

The building's neon sign was temporarily removed in early July 2015 due to progress in façade assembly. A more advanced version of the sign returned permanently to the top of the tower in May 2016 for the opening of the building.

== Awards ==
In December 2011, the Warsaw Spire won the Eurobuild Awards 2011 in the category Outstanding Architectural Design of the Year in Poland.

In March 2014, the complex received the BREEAM Excellent certificate during the MIPIM international property fair in Cannes, France.

In 2017, the building received the MIPIM award for Best Office and Business Development in the world during the MIPIM international property fair.

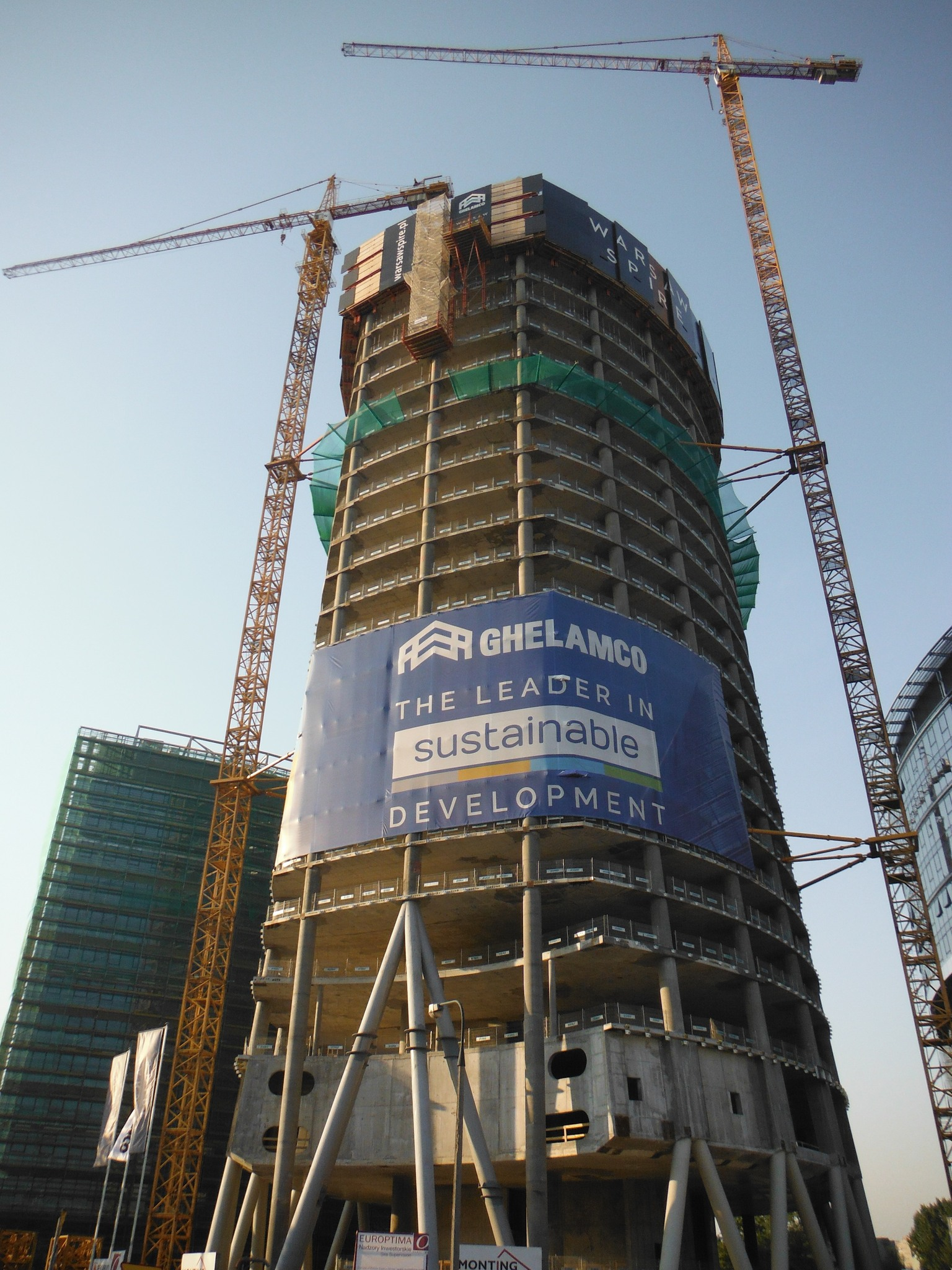
Warsaw Spire under construction (August 2014)

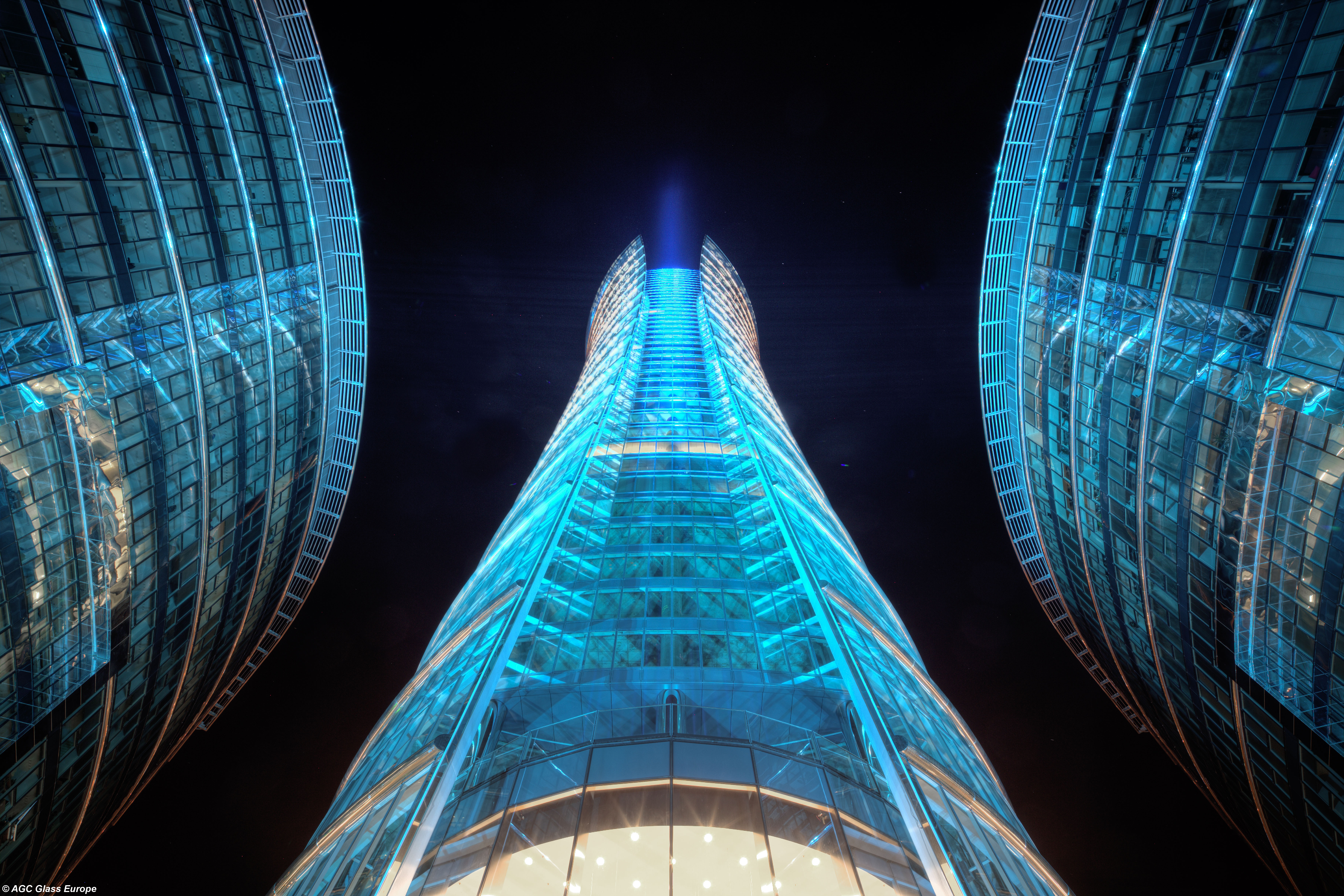
Warsaw Spire during its opening, 12 May 2016

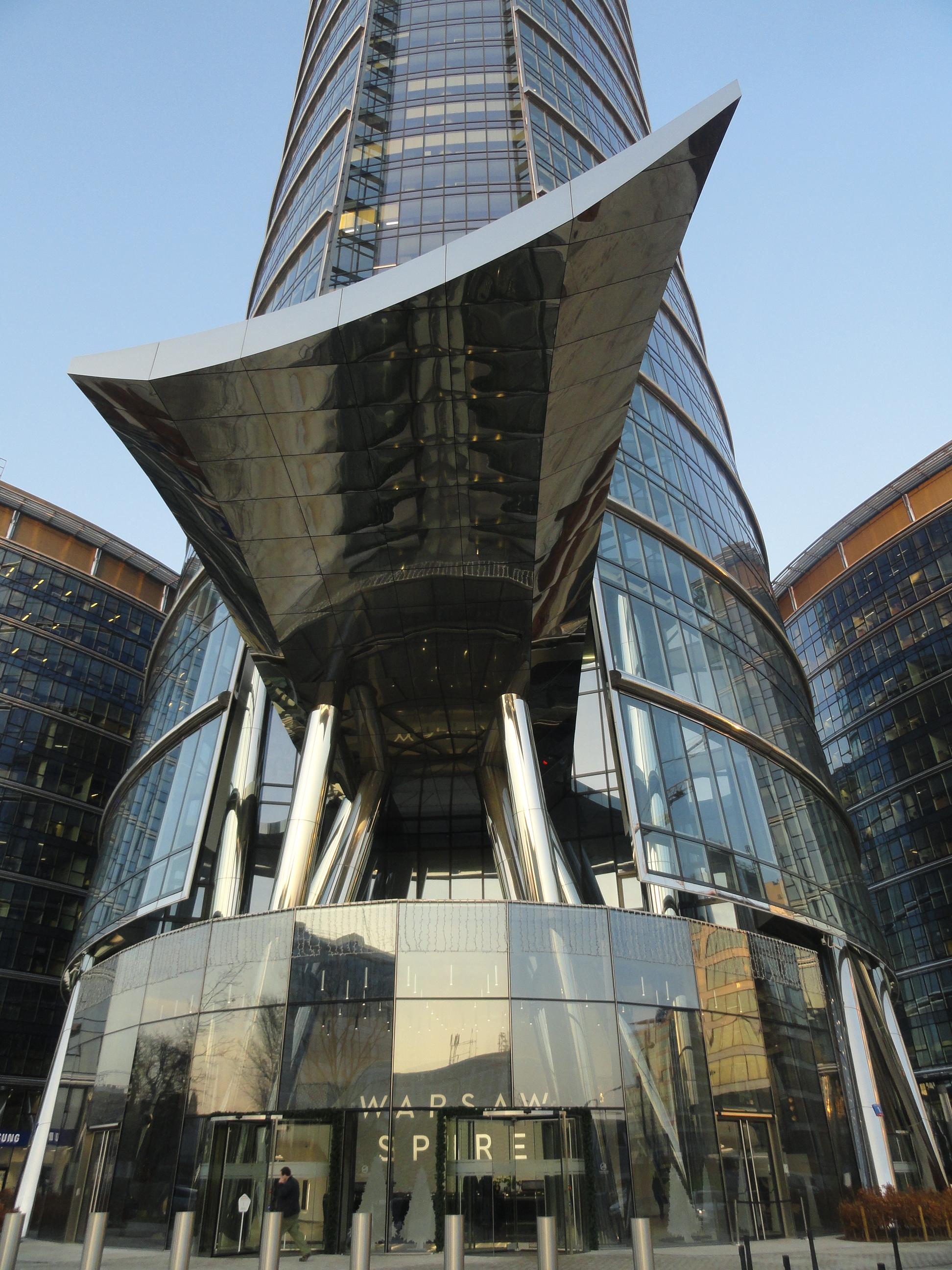
Entrance of the tower

== See also ==
- List of tallest buildings in Poland
