= Wilhelm August Golicke =

Russian painter (1802–1848)

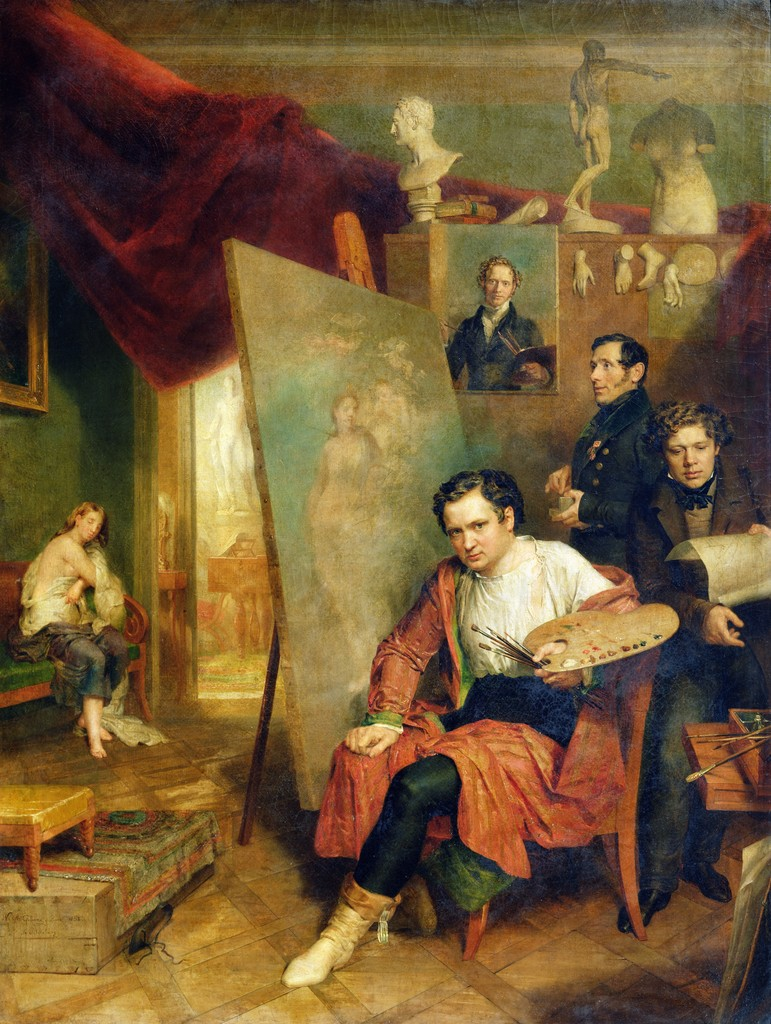
Golicke in his studio (1832)

Wilhelm August Golicke (Russian: Вильгельм-Август Голике, romanized: Vilgelm-Avgust Golike), also known as Vasily Aleksandrovich Golike (Russian: Василий Александрович Голике; 1790 or 1802 – 5 July 1848), was a Russian painter of Baltic German origin, active in St. Petersburg during the reigns of Alexander I and Nicholas I. He is primarily known for his portraits.

== Life and paintings ==
He was born in Tallinn or Saint Petersburg. He grew up in the German community of Tallinn ("Reval", in German), and studied in Saint Petersburg at the studios of the English painter George Dawe.

Between 1822 and 1828 Dawe, together with Golicke and another of his students, Alexander Polyakov, a serf, painted 332 portraits of Tsarist Generals who had distinguished themselves in the war against Napoleon. The paintings were placed in the Military Gallery of the Winter Palace. Dawe became a good friend of Golicke's during their work together and left him an annuity in his will.

After Dawes' death, Golicke studied at the Imperial Academy of Arts. He graduated in 1832 and was named an "Independent Artist" (Cвободный Xудожник), a sign of official recognition. In 1837, he visited England and Italy. He died in Saint Petersburg, of cholera, in 1848.

His post-Dawe work consisted largely of genre paintings, still-lifes and scenes from history. Many of his works can be seen at the Tretyakov Gallery in Moscow.
