= George Dawe =

English painter (1781–1829)

George Dawe RA
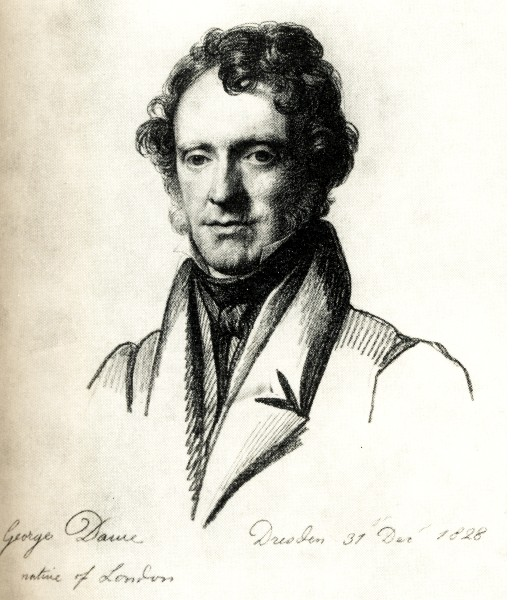
- Portrait by Carl Christian Vogel von Vogelstein, 1828
- Born: 6 February 1781; St James's, Westminster, England
- Died: 15 October 1829 (aged 48); Kentish Town, England
- Resting place: St Paul's Cathedral, London
- Known for: Portrait painting

George Dawe RA (6 February 1781 – 15 October 1829) was an English portraitist who painted 329 portraits of Russian generals active during Napoleon's invasion of Russia for the Military Gallery of the Winter Palace. He relocated to Saint Petersburg in 1819, where he won acclaim for his work from the artistic establishment and complimentary verses by Pushkin. He was the son of Philip Dawe, a successful mezzotint engraver who also produced political cartoons relating to the events of the Boston Tea Party. One of his brothers was Henry Edward Dawe, also a portraitist.

== Life and career ==
=== Early life and studies ===
George Dawe was born on 6 February 1781 to Philip Dawe and Jane in Brewer Street, in the parish of St James's in Westminster. Philip was an artist and engraver in mezzotint who had worked with Hogarth and Joseph Mallord William Turner and who also produced satirical political cartoons about life in America which are still highly regarded. George was the first child born to the couple and there would be other successful artists in the family. Dawe was baptised on 25 February 1781 at St James's Church in Piccadilly, with George Morland as his godfather. He originally trained with his father as an engraver and became very accomplished from an early age. He later became interested in painting and went on to study at the Royal Academy of Arts where he won the Royal Academy Schools Gold Medal in 1803. He was elected an associate member of the Royal Academy in 1809 and became an Academician in 1814. He collected old masters and studied modern and classical languages, philosophy and literature. He also studied anatomy as part of his pursuit of a better understanding of the human form and undertook human dissections in his own home as well as attending operations to improve his knowledge of the human body.

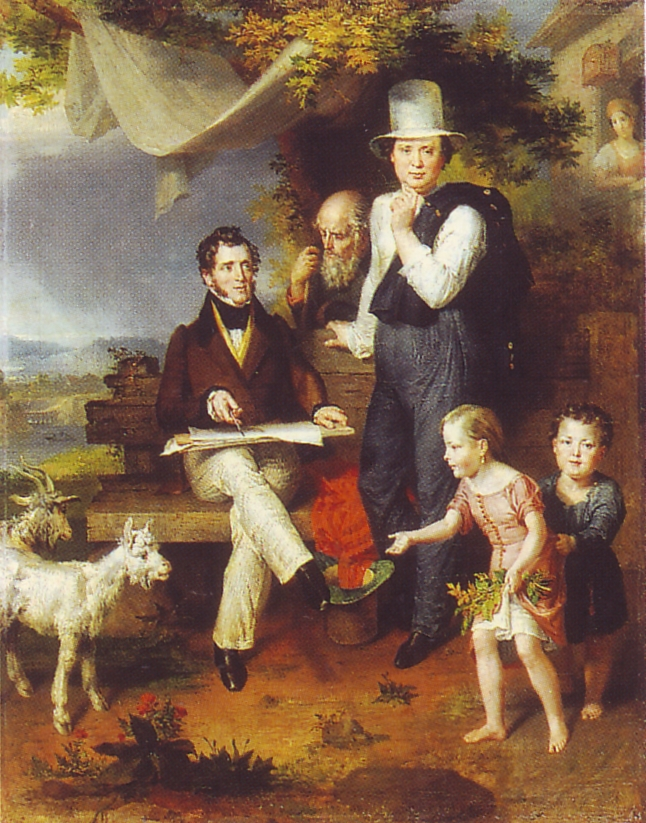
George Dawe (seated) and Wilhelm August Golicke (in the hat) with members of his family. Painting by Wilhelm August Golicke (1834?).

=== Portrait painting ===
His painting of classical subjects won much praise and were the making of his early reputation but he was more interested in financial success and sought portraiture commissions which were lucrative and which brought him into contact with high society. However, the direct way in which he promoted his own work was not approved of by artistic society and brought considerable criticism from his contemporaries, one of whom was John Constable, who painted a background for a Dawe portrait on at least one occasion. He enjoyed the patronage of the Duke and Duchess of Kent and also that of Princess Charlotte and Prince Leopold.

=== Career in Russia ===
In 1819 he travelled with the Duke of Kent through Europe. On this tour his painting of portraits of military staff and diplomats brought him to the attention of Alexander I who commissioned him to paint the portraits of senior Russian military staff who had successfully fought Napoleon. He went to live in St Petersburg and, from 1822 to 1828, painted over 300 portraits for the military collection at the Winter Palace with his assistants, Alexander Polyakov and Wilhelm August Golicke. He became a celebrity throughout Europe and mixed with the Russian intellectual elite. Among others he met and knew were Pushkin who wrote a poem about him entitled "To Dawe Esq." In 1826 Nicholas I invited him to his coronation ceremony and in 1828 he was officially appointed First Portrait Painter of the Imperial Court.

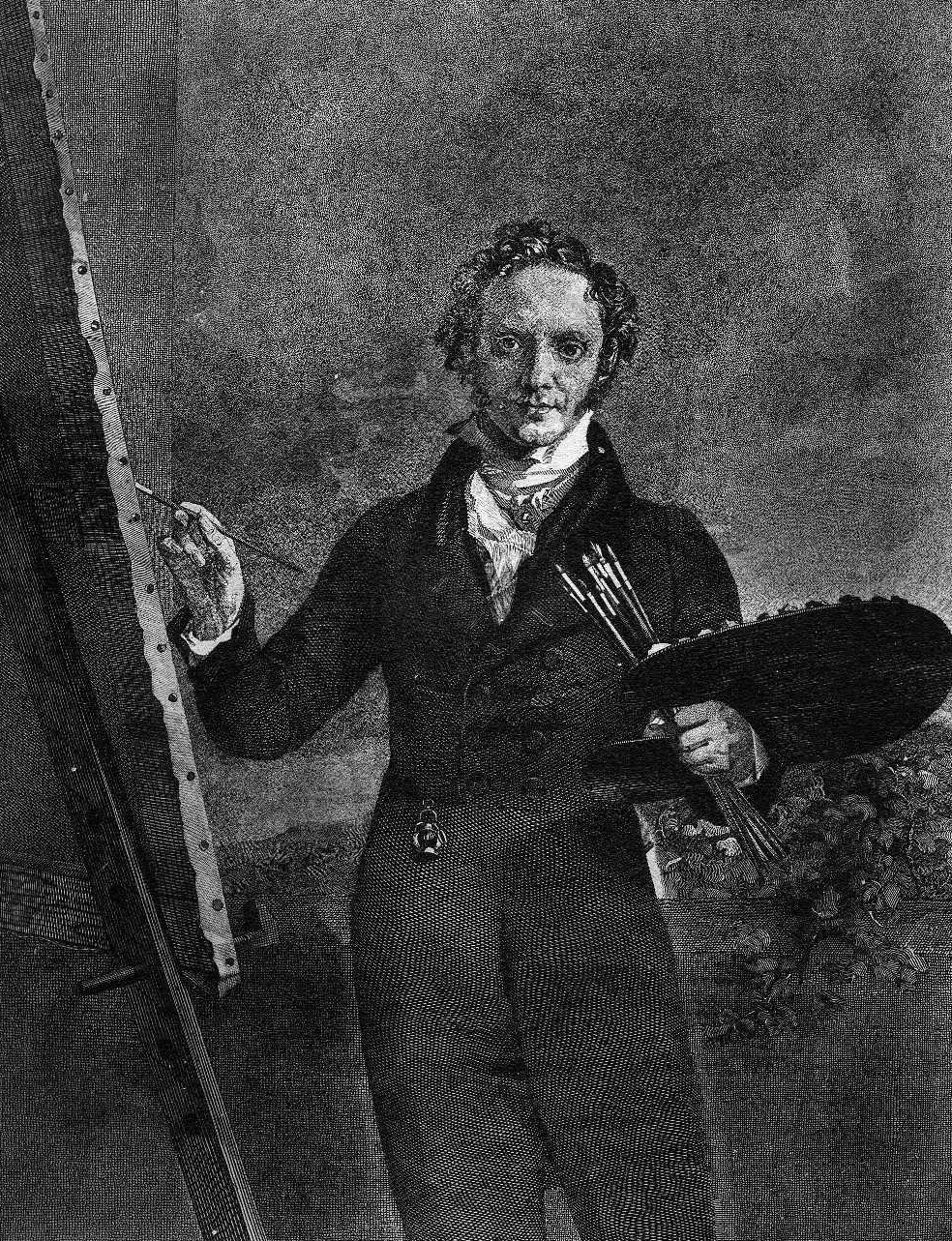
George Dawe at work (artist unknown)

Dawe returned to England in 1828 and stayed for several months. During this time he exhibited many of his recent works and George IV was among those to whom they were privately shown.

=== Decline in health, and death ===
He returned to St Petersburg in 1829 but soon became increasingly unwell with breathing difficulties following a serious cold. He had pulmonary weakness throughout life following childhood illness. He returned to London in August 1829 and died on 15 October at the home of his brother-in-law, Thomas Wright, a celebrated engraver. He was buried in the crypt of St Paul's Cathedral and his funeral was attended by many artists and officials from the Russian embassy.

The significant body of work he created in Russia is currently housed in the military gallery in the Hermitage Museum in St Petersburg. Many of his paintings are also included in the British Royal Collection. Despite the international celebrity he enjoyed in his own lifetime his popularity did not endure in England, although in Russia he is still well-known and held in high regard.

== Gallery ==
=== Russian royalty, noblemen and military officers ===
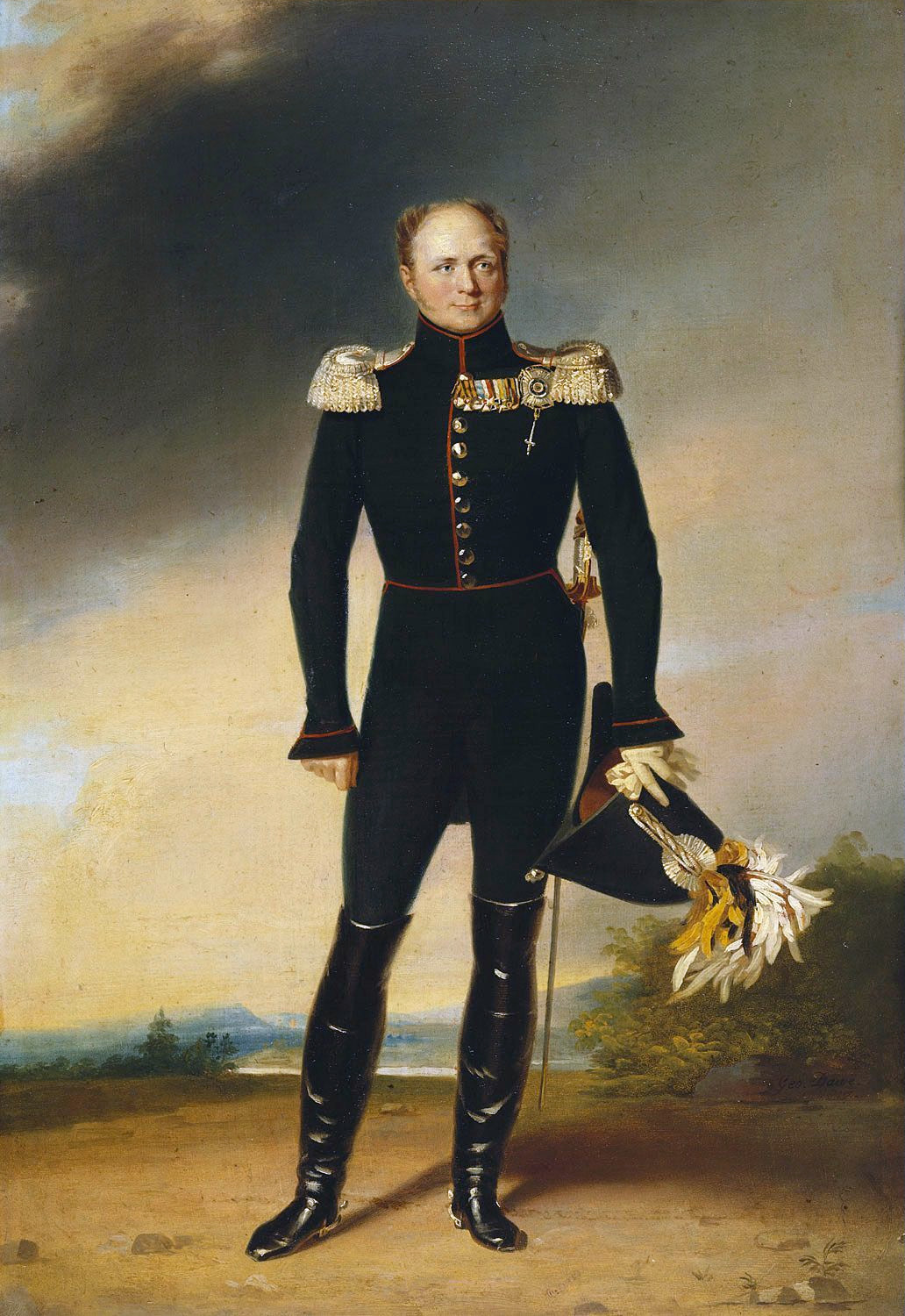
Alexander I of Russia

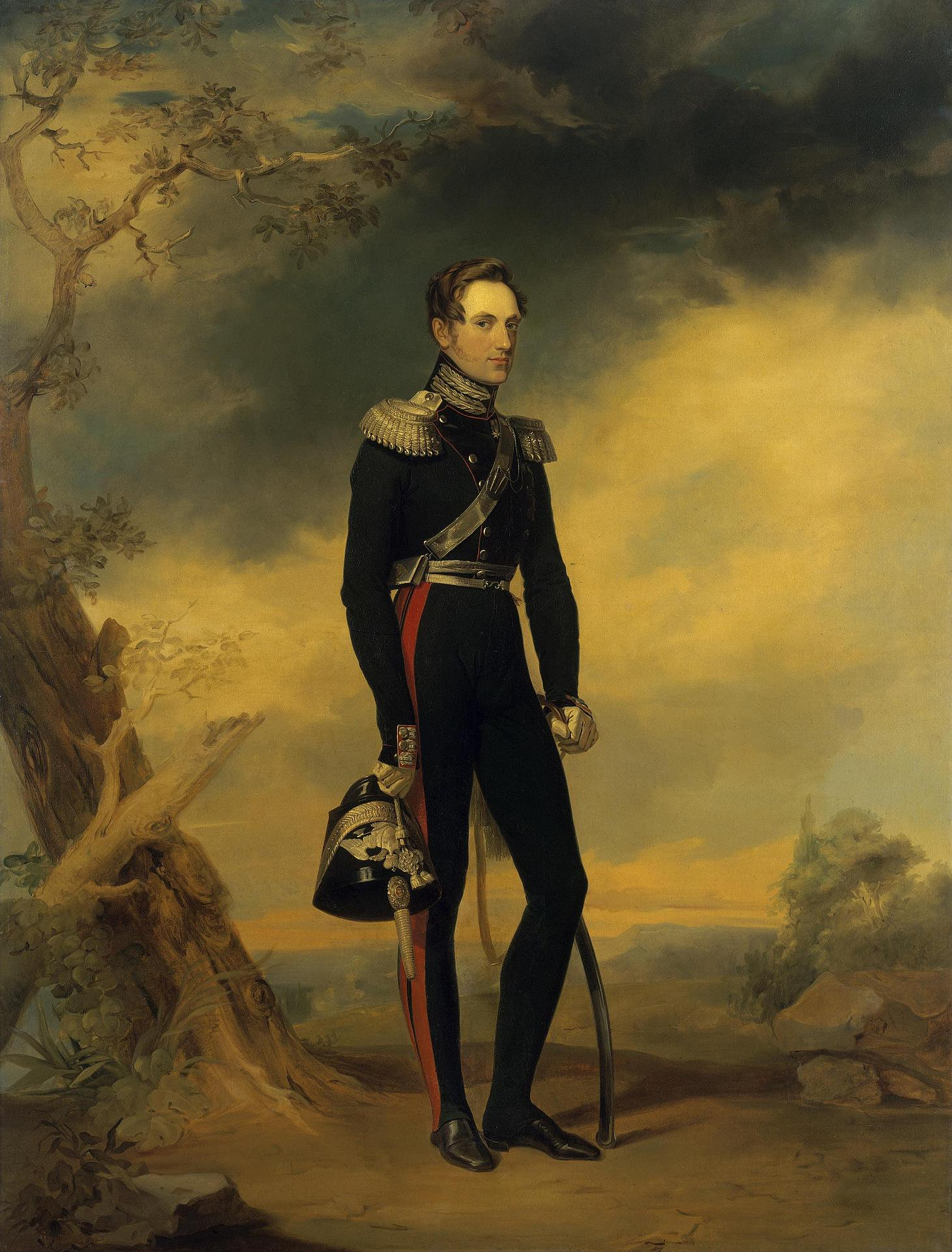
Nicholas I of Russia

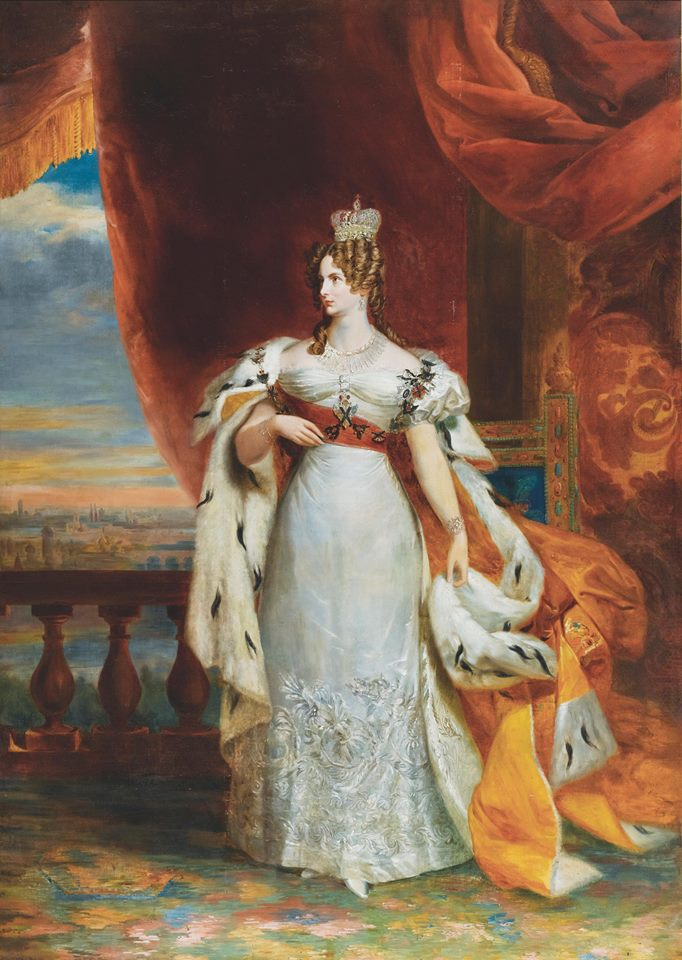
Alexandra Feodorovna

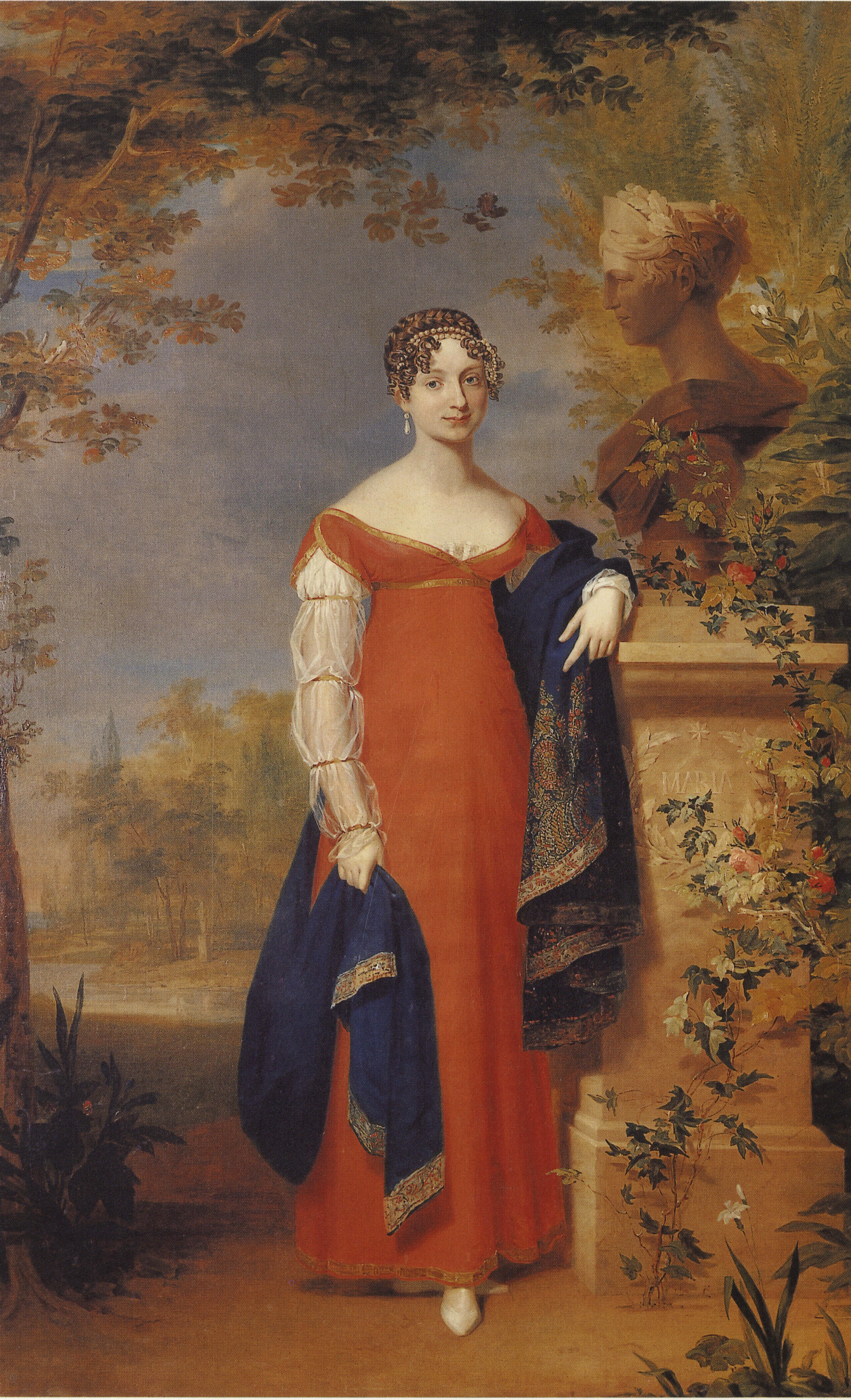
Anna, Queen of the Netherlands

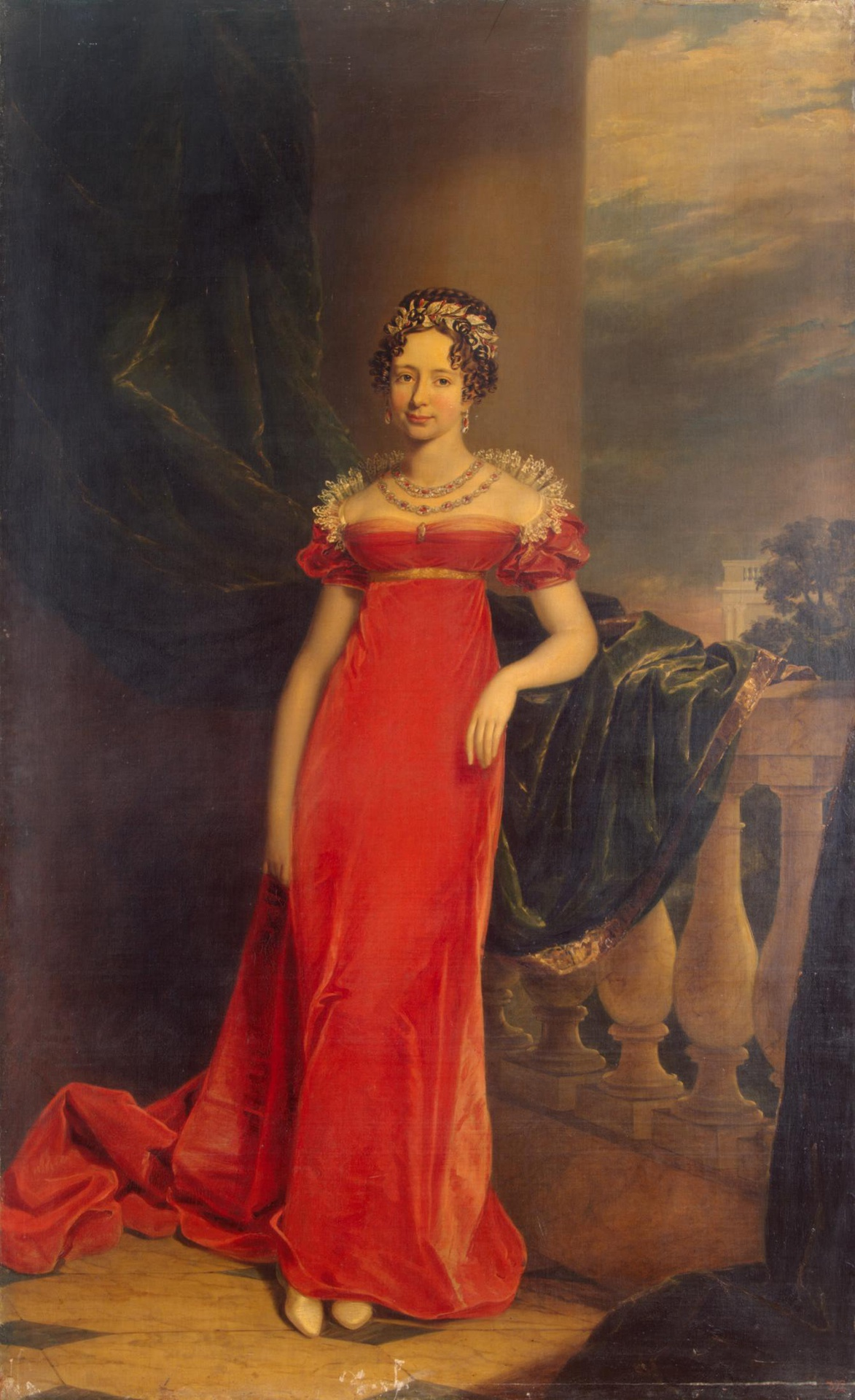
Maria Pavlovna of Russia

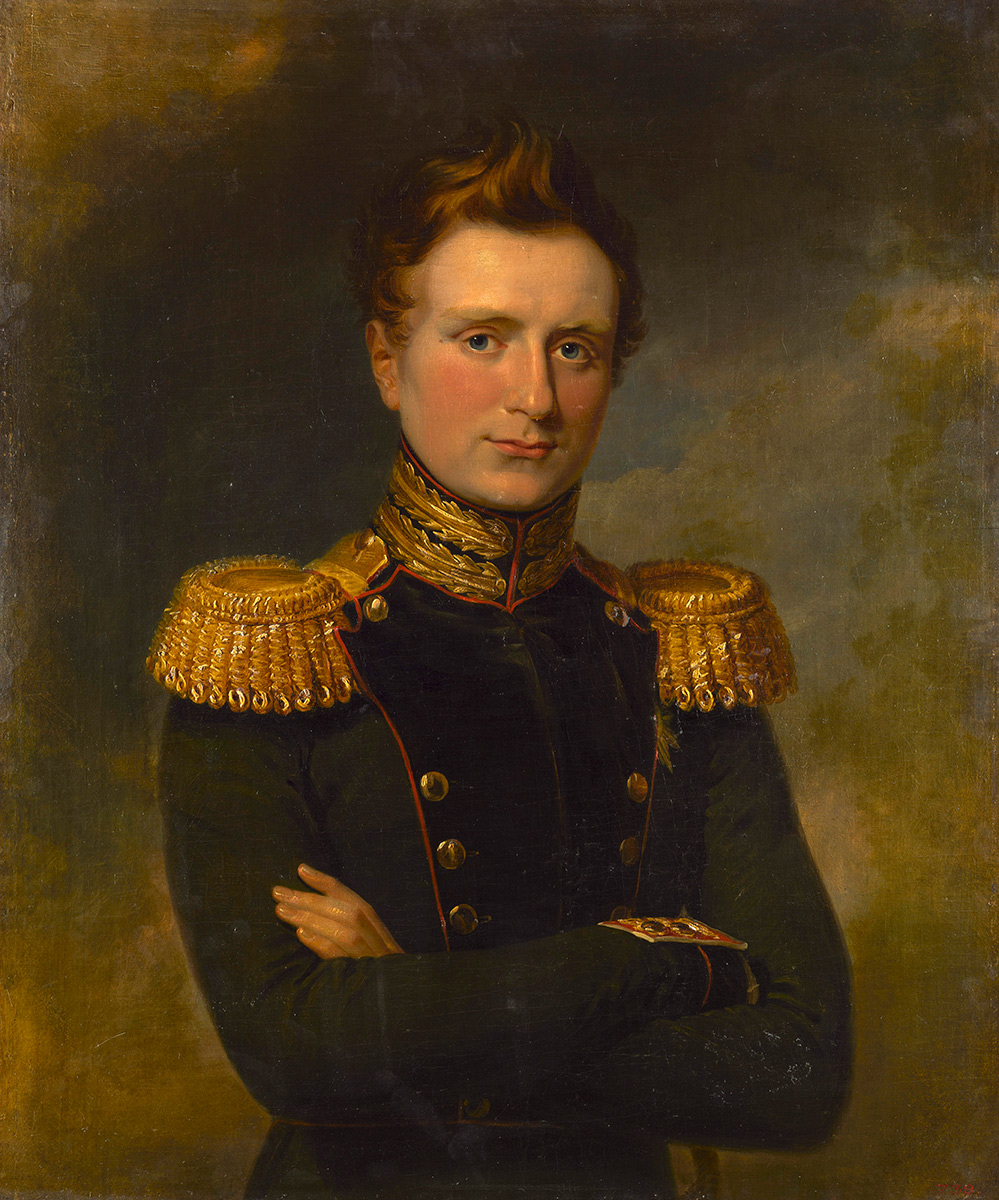
Grand Duke Michael of Russia

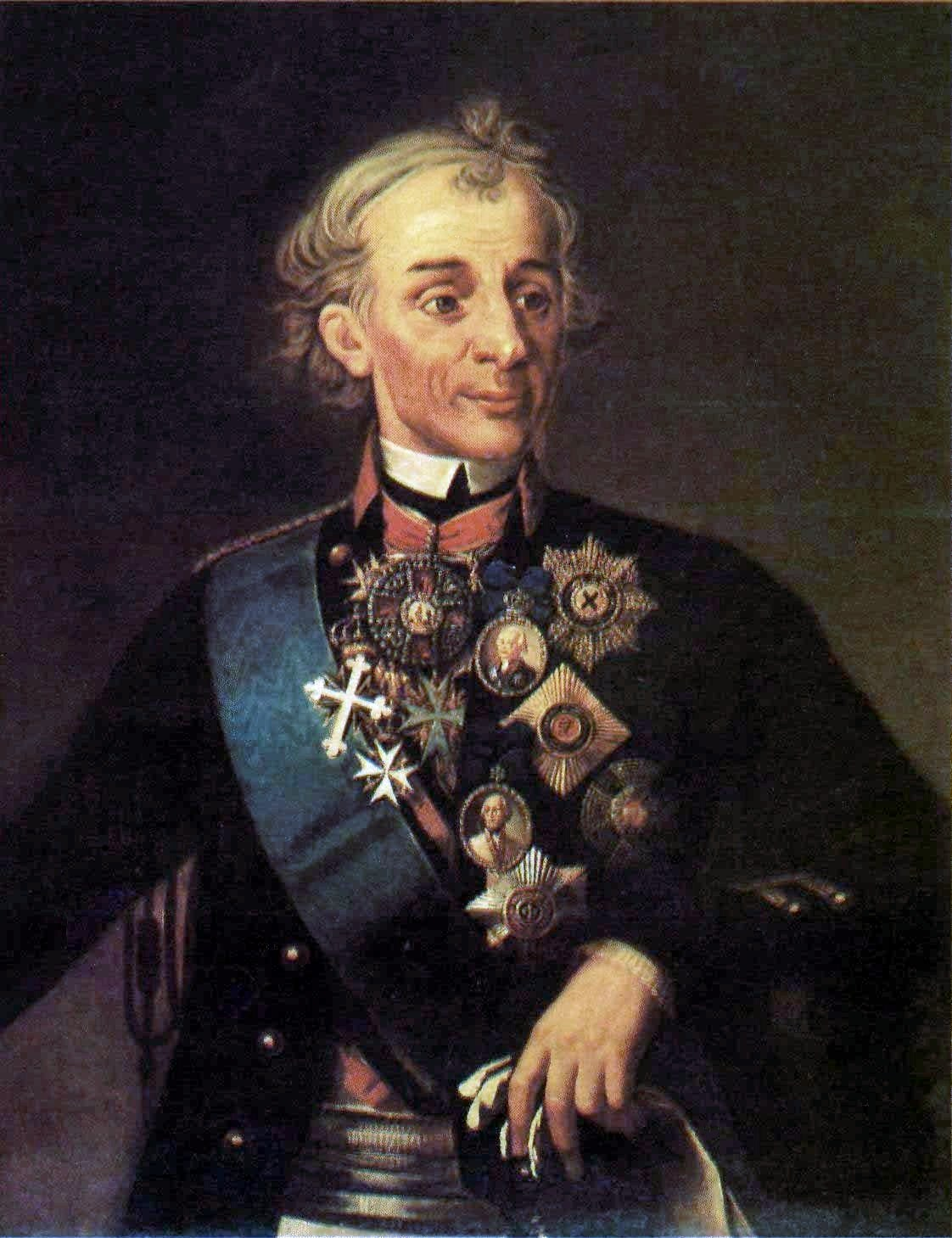
Alexander Suvorov

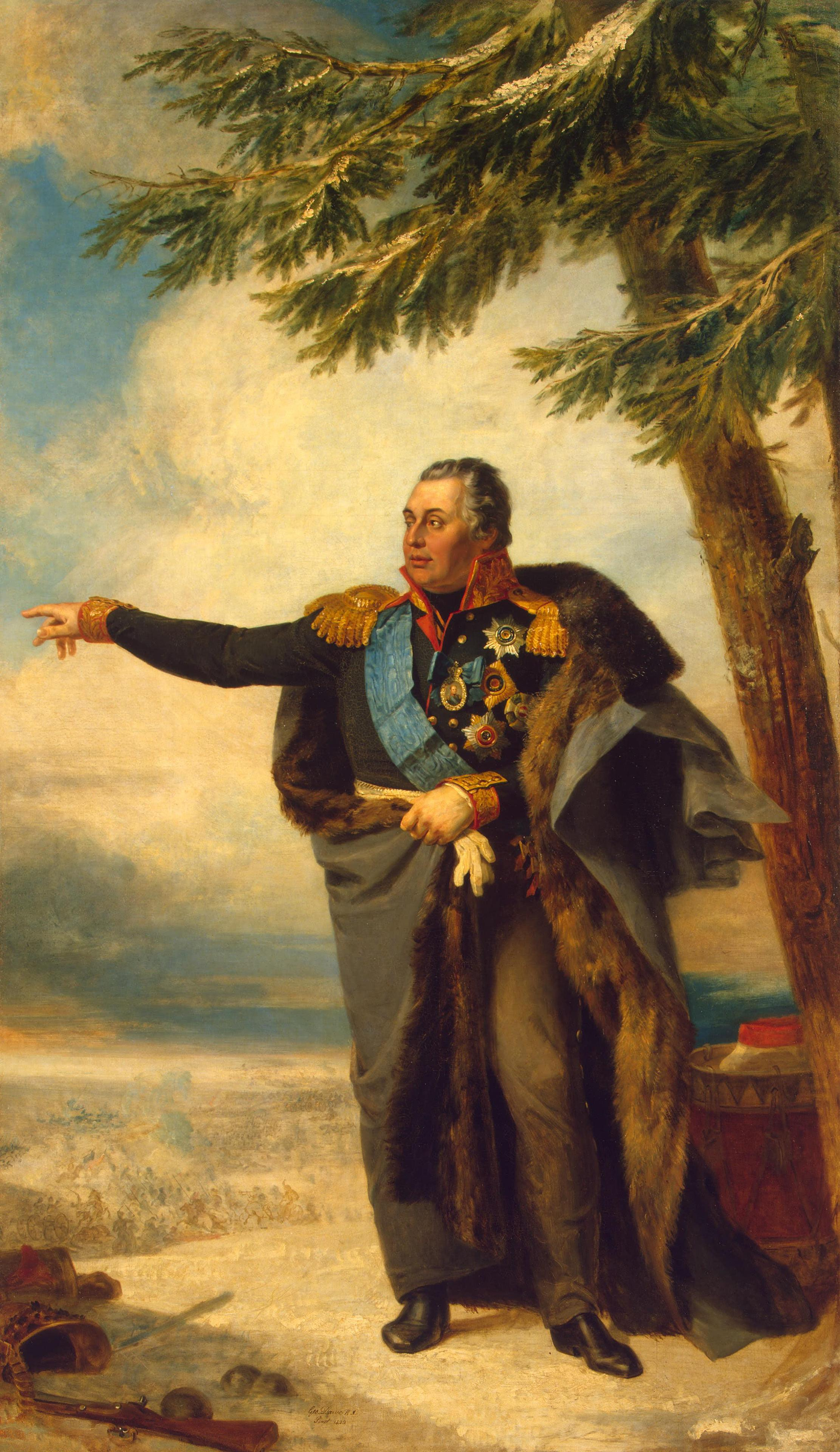
Mikhail Kutuzov

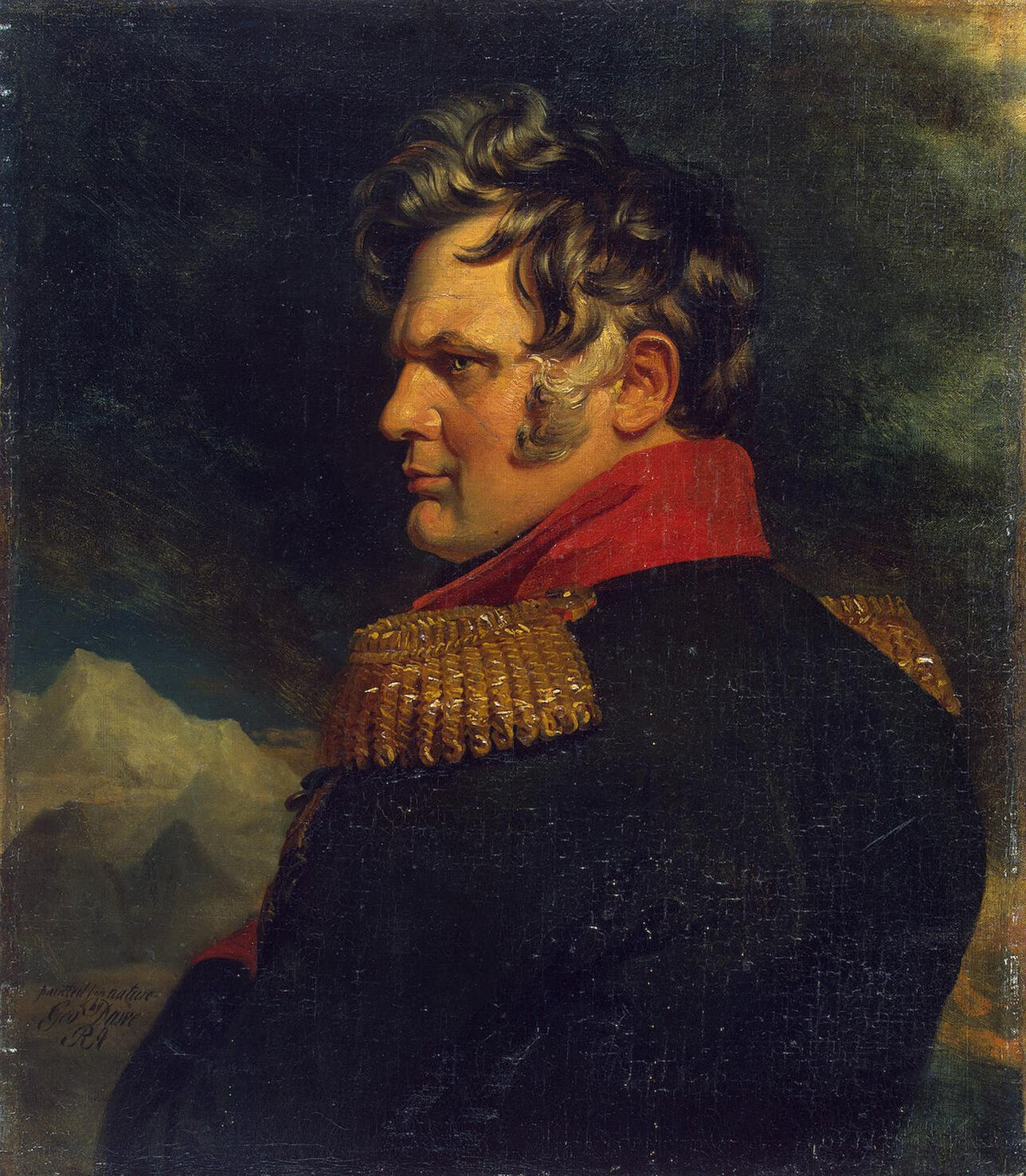
Aleksey Petrovich Yermolov

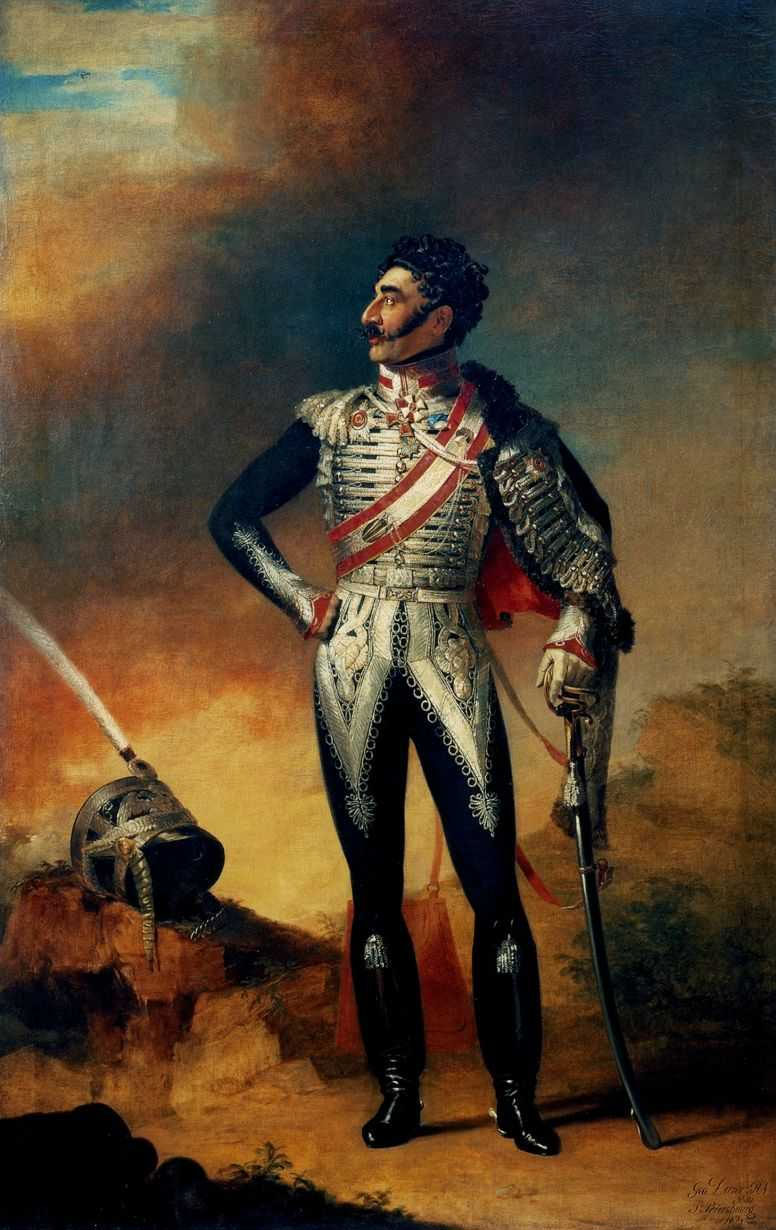
Valerian Madatov

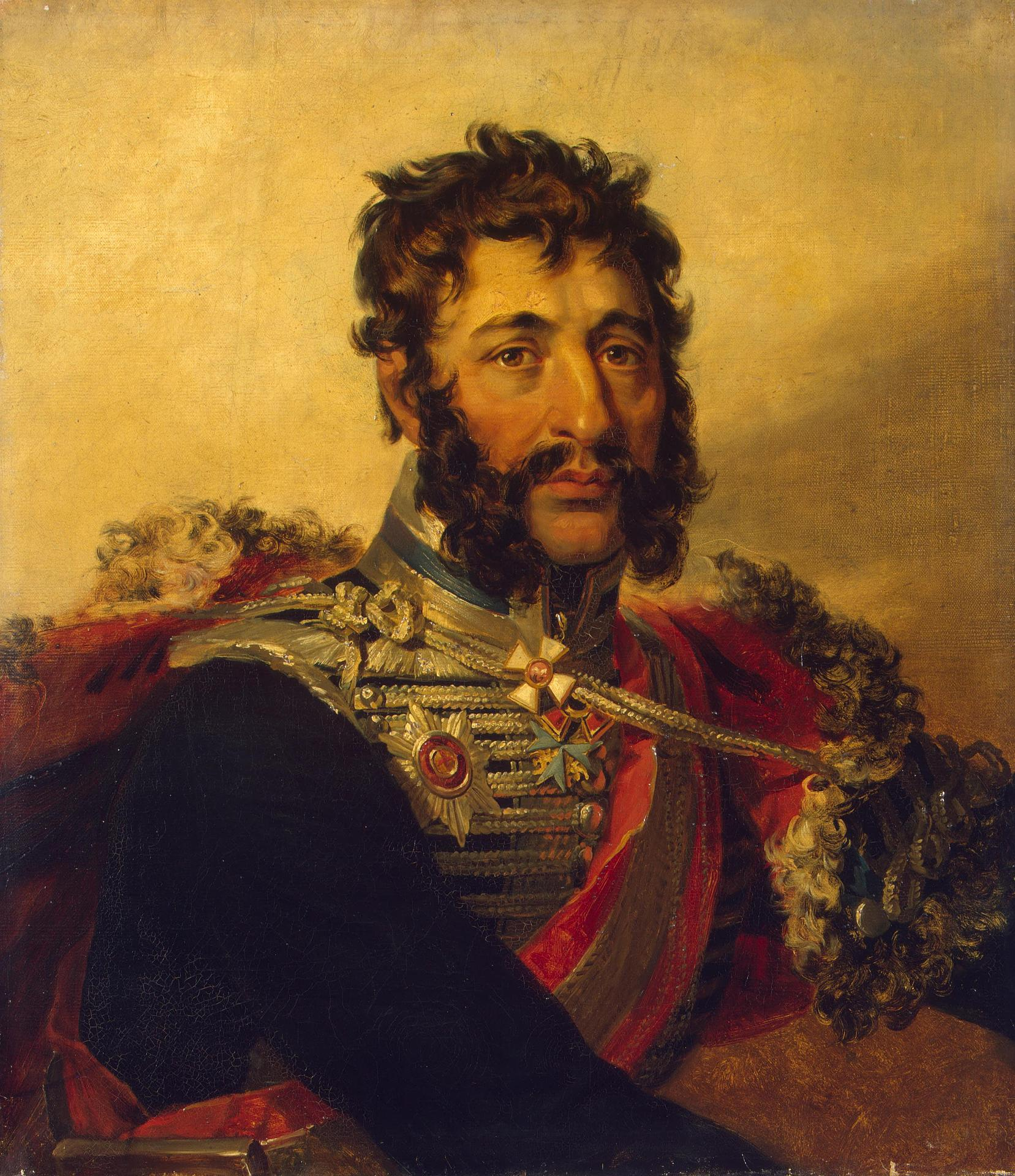
Yakov Kulnev

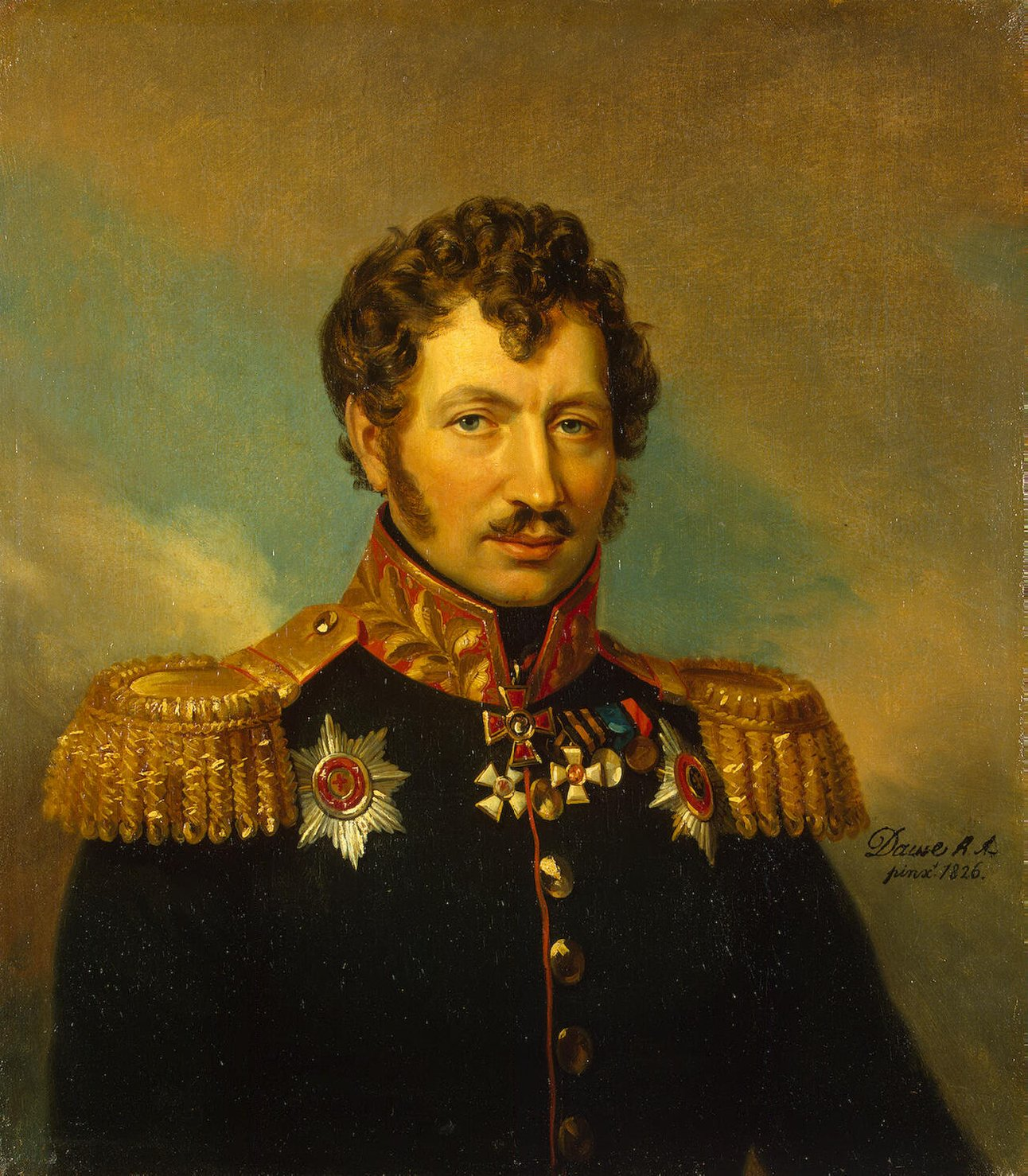
Cyprian von Kreutz

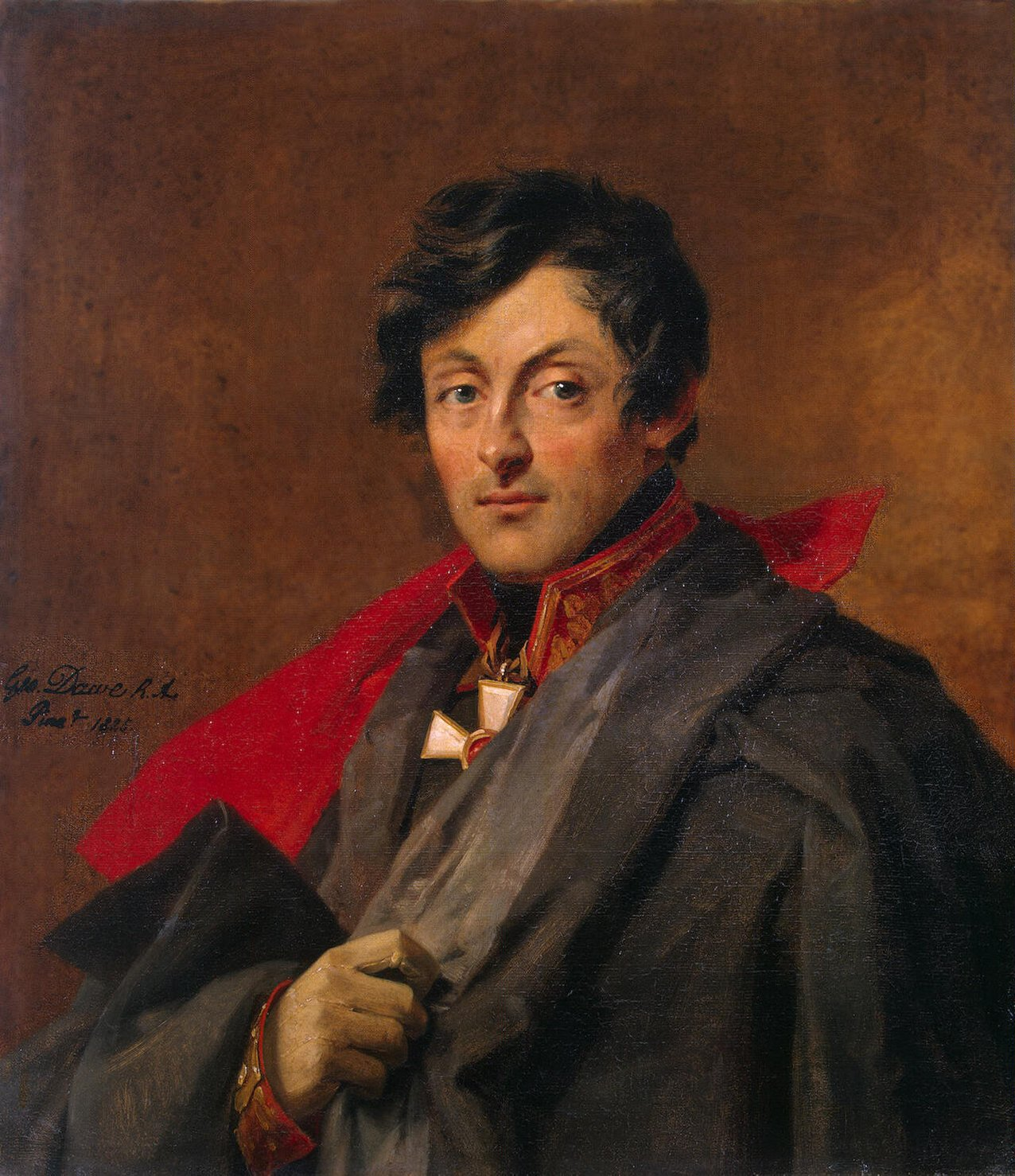
Alexander Ivanovich Ostermann-Tolstoy

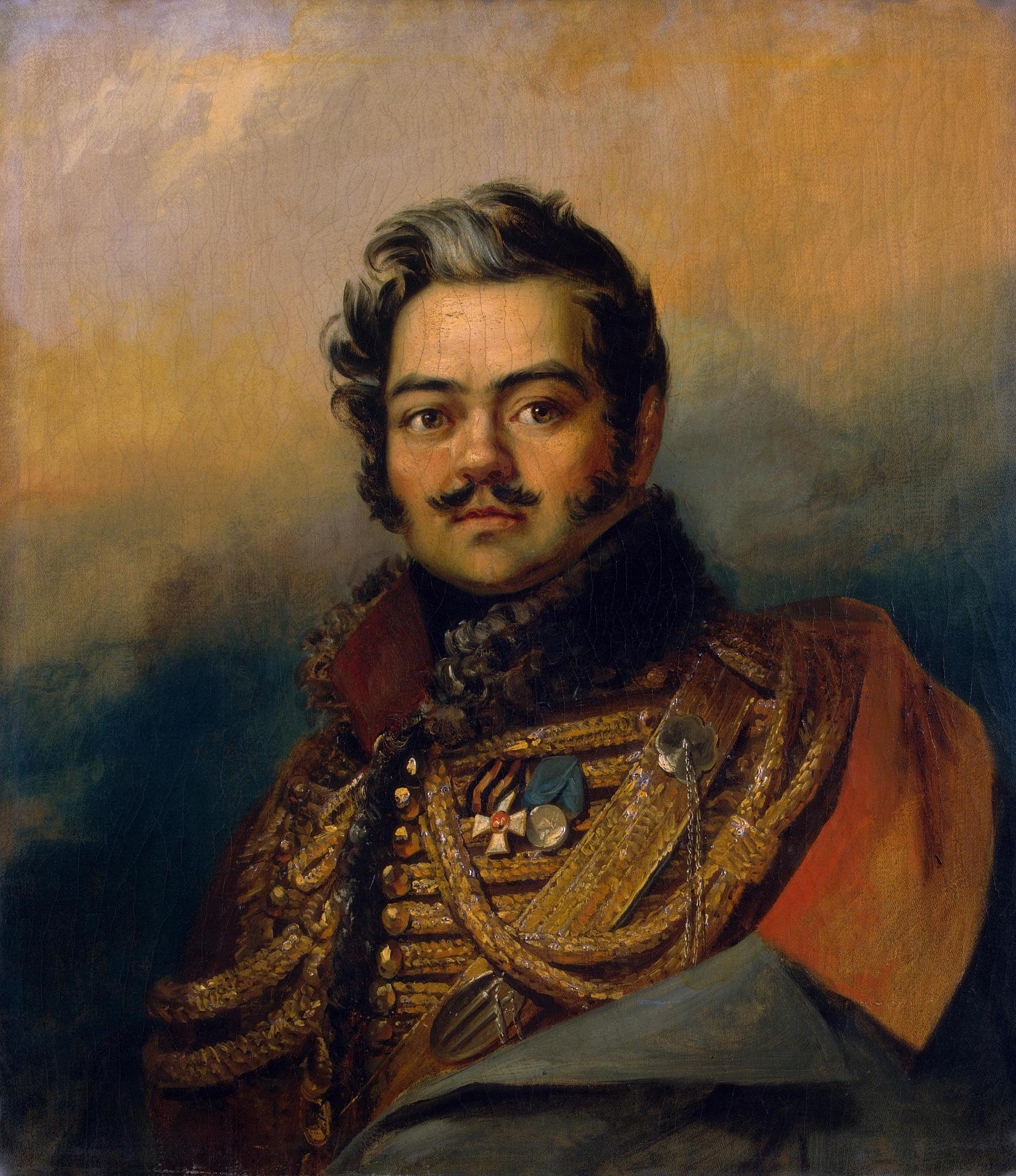
Denis Davydov

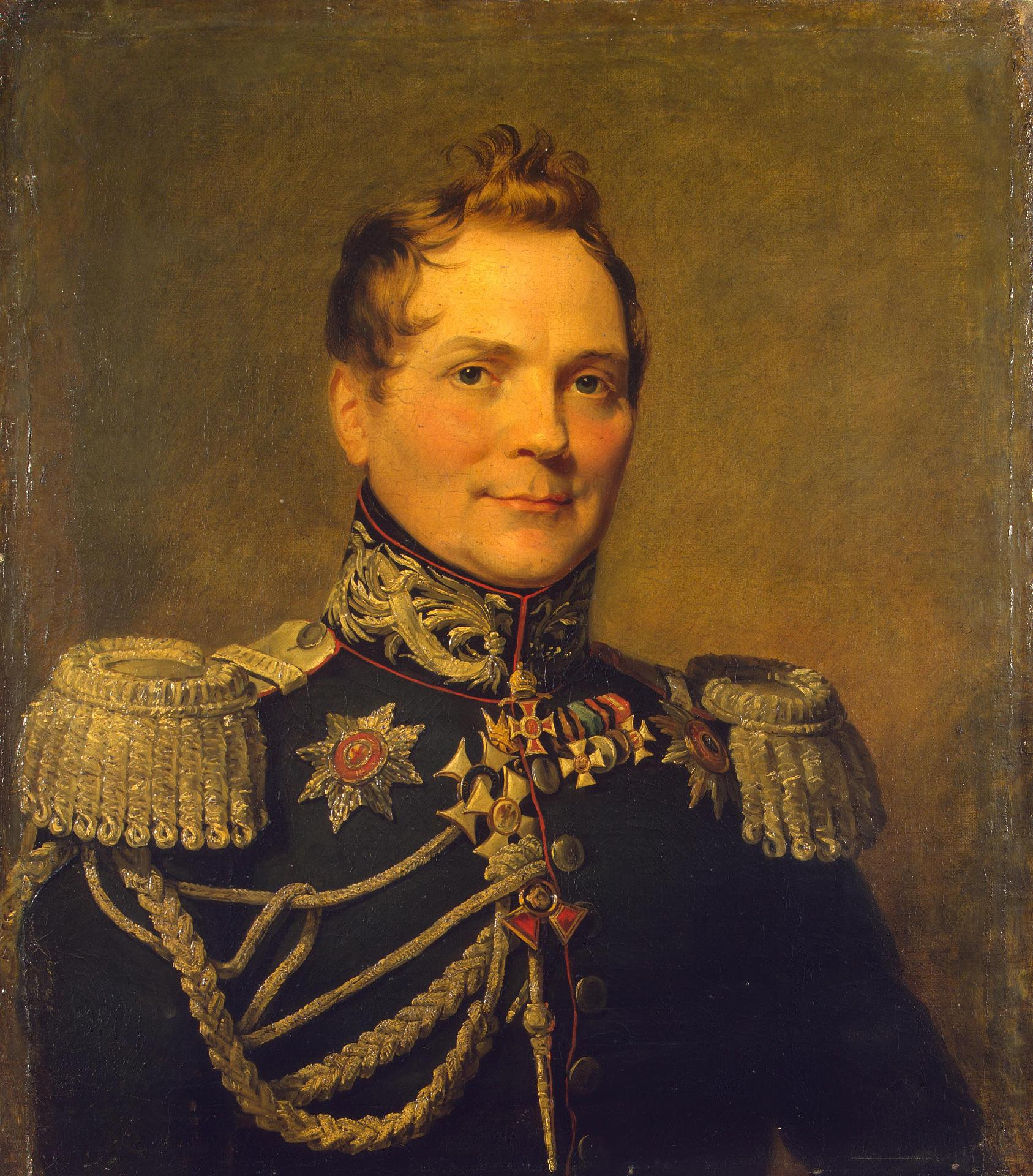
Karl Wilhelm von Toll

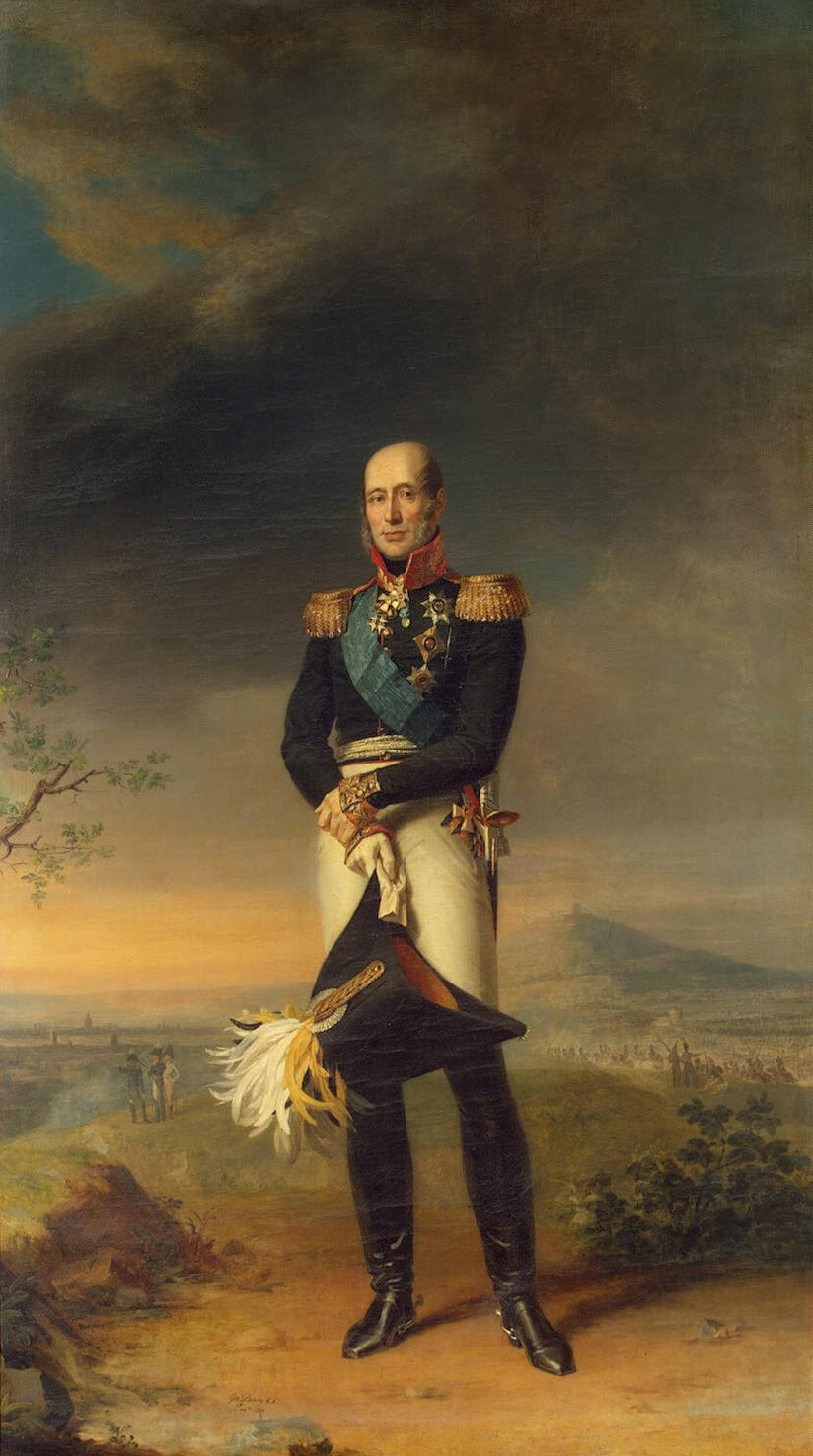
Barclay de Tolly

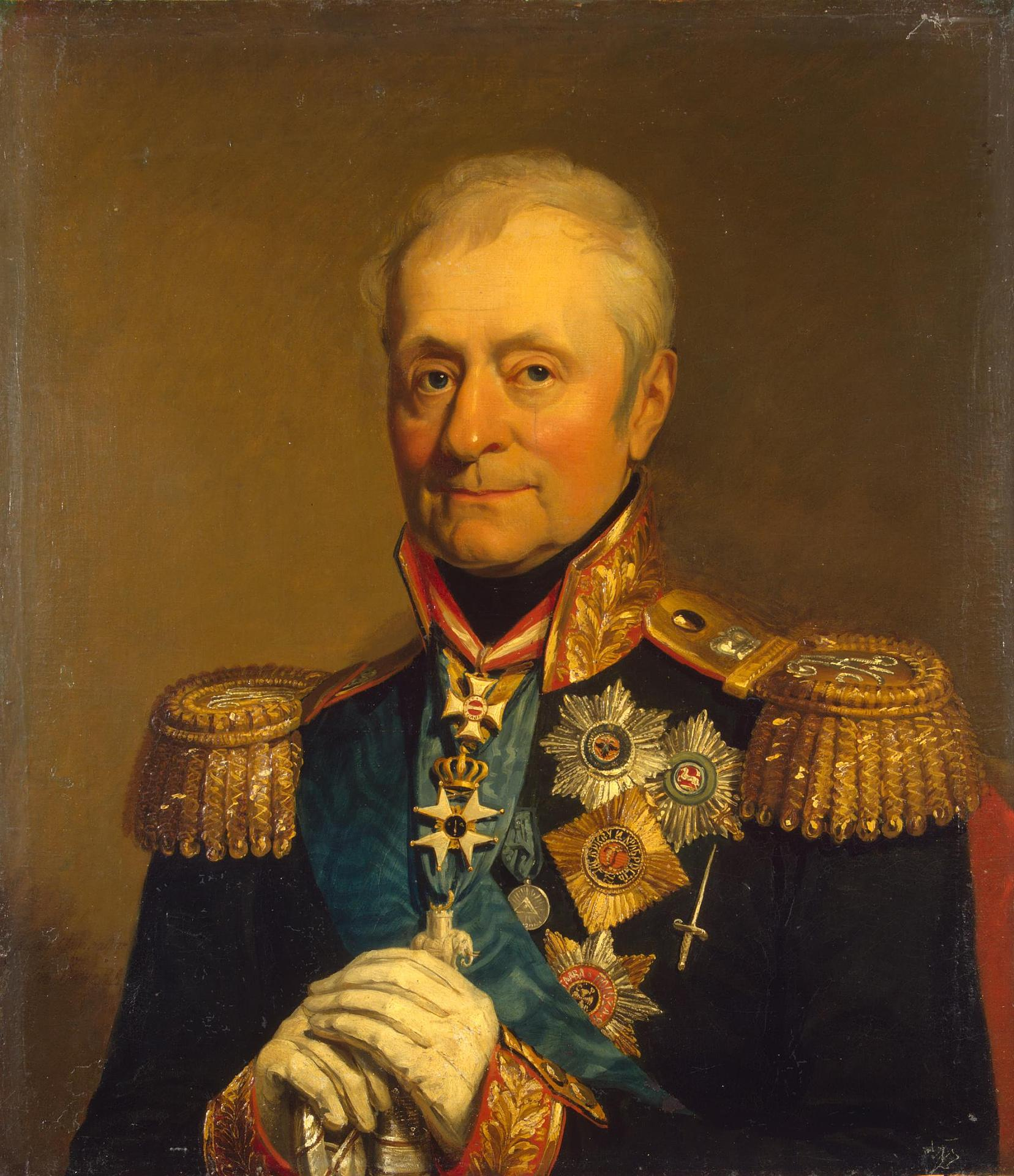
Levin August von Bennigsen

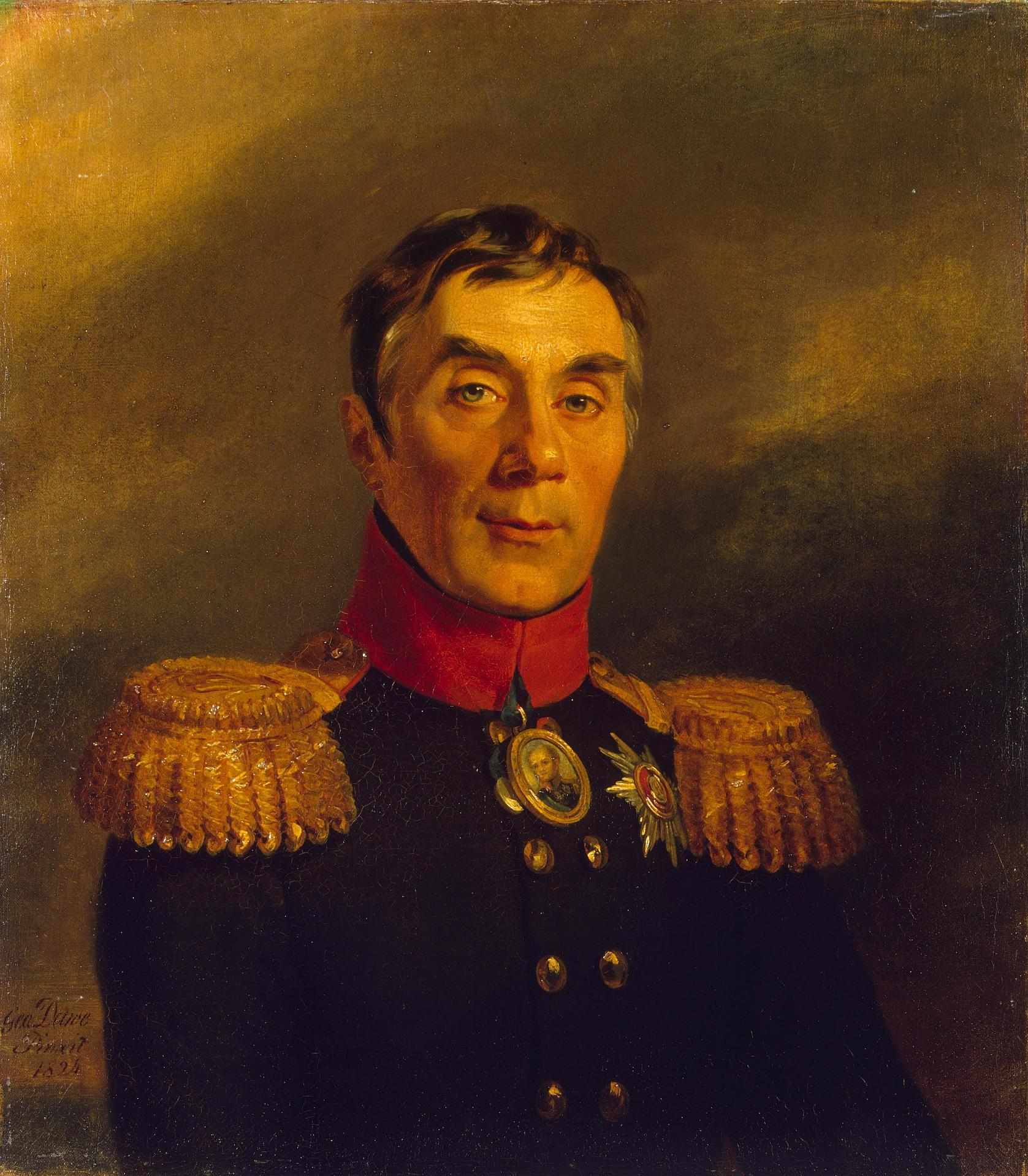
Count Aleksey Arakcheyev

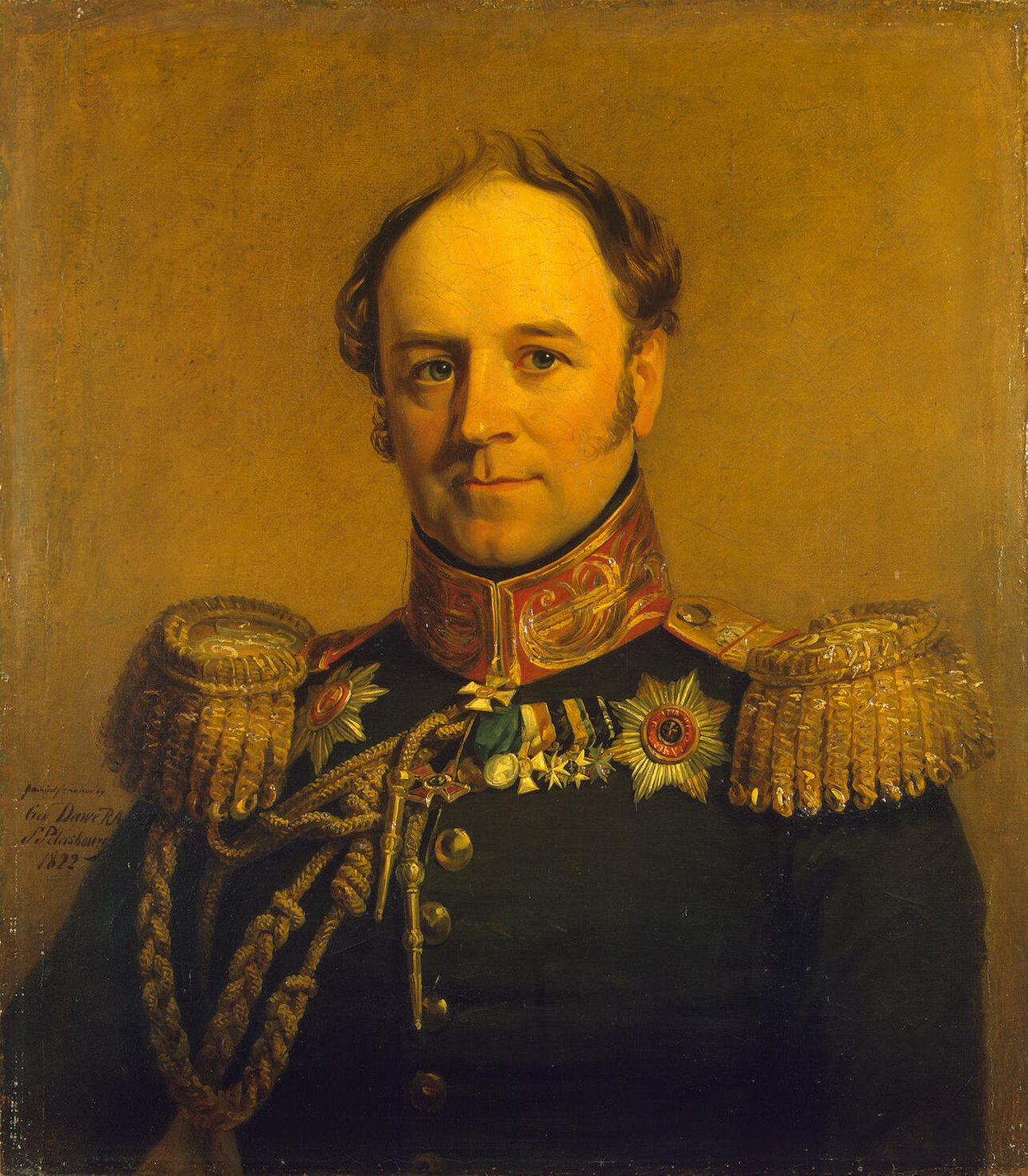
Alexander von Benckendorff

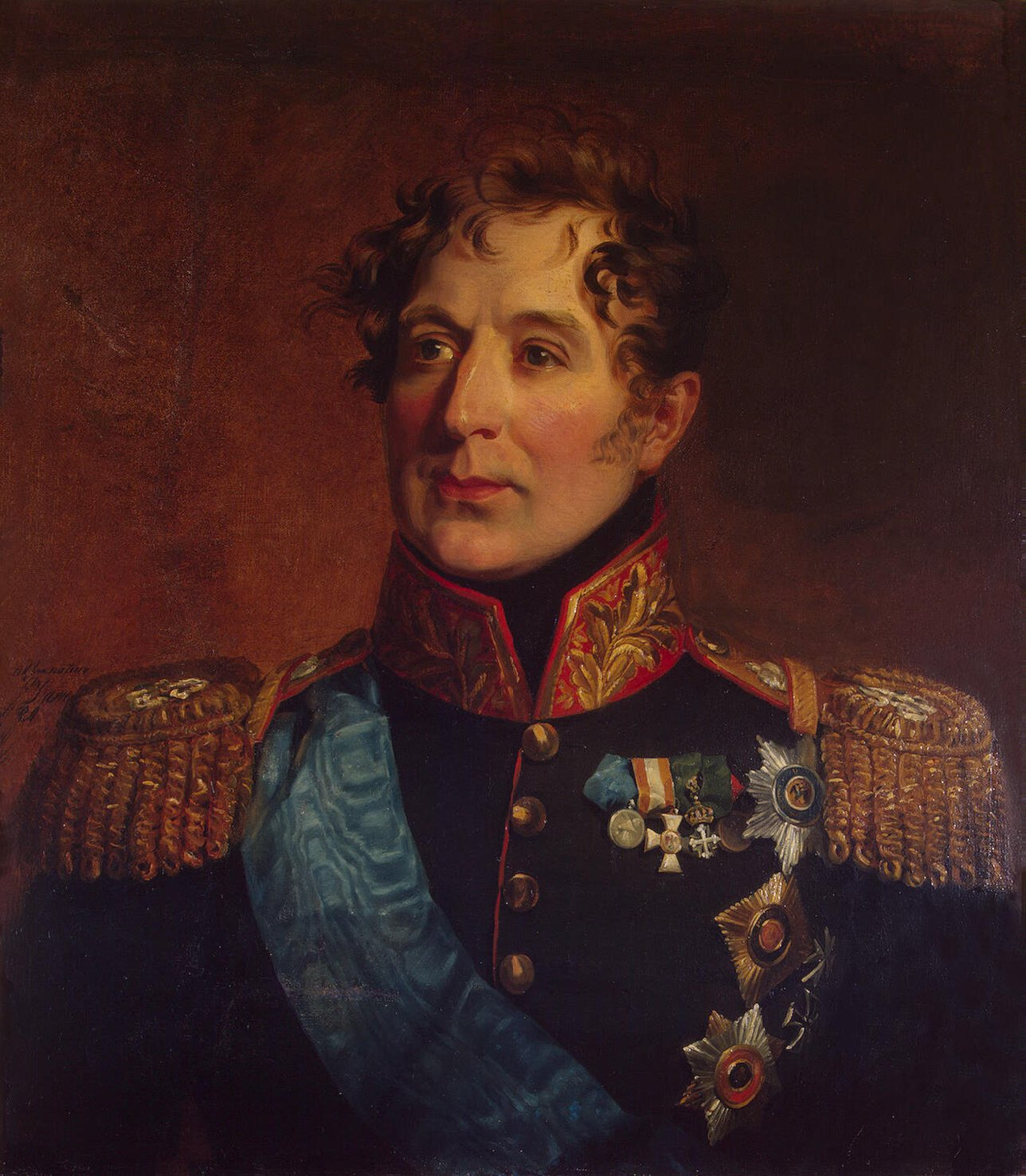
Mikhail Miloradovich

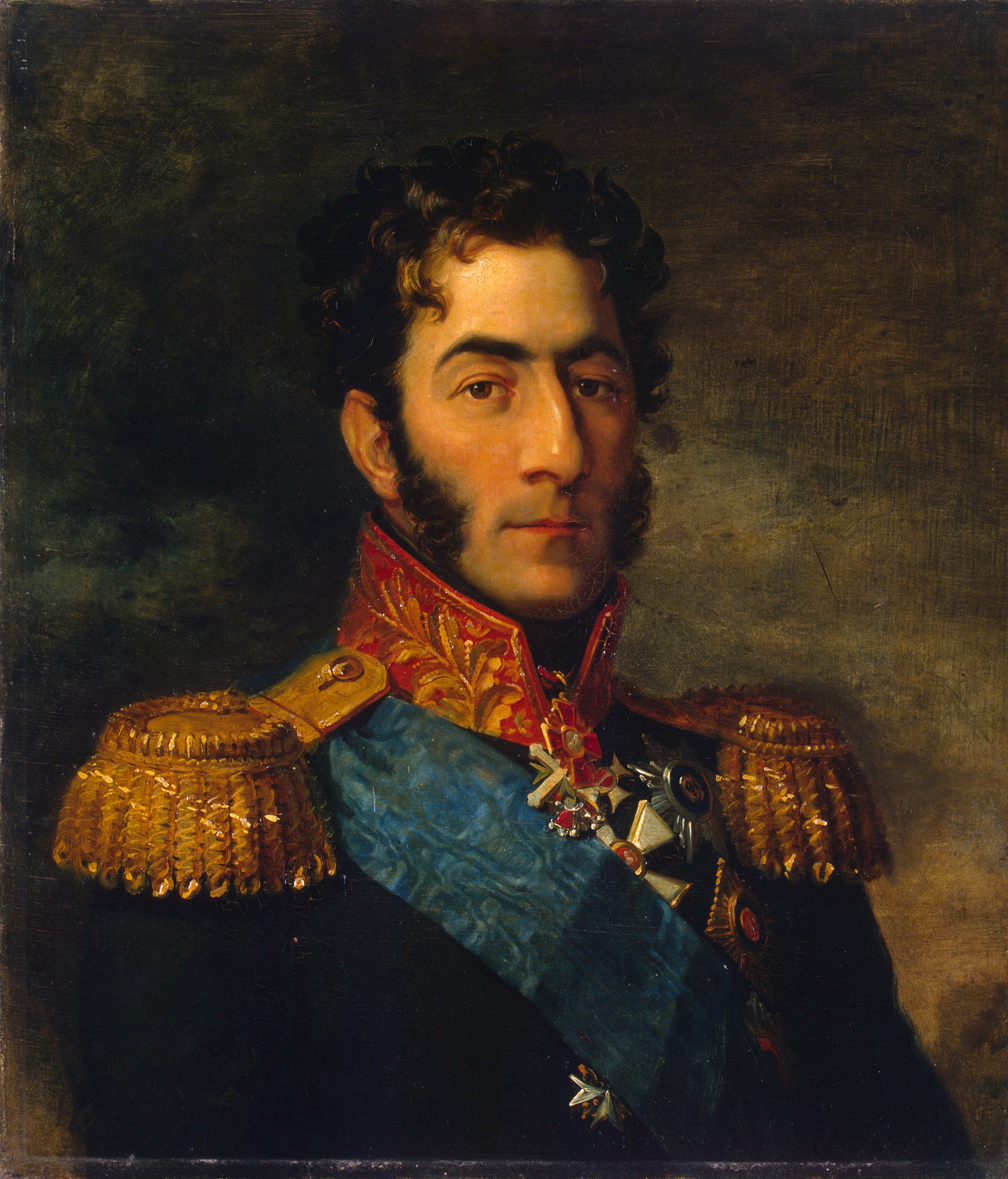
Pyotr Bagration

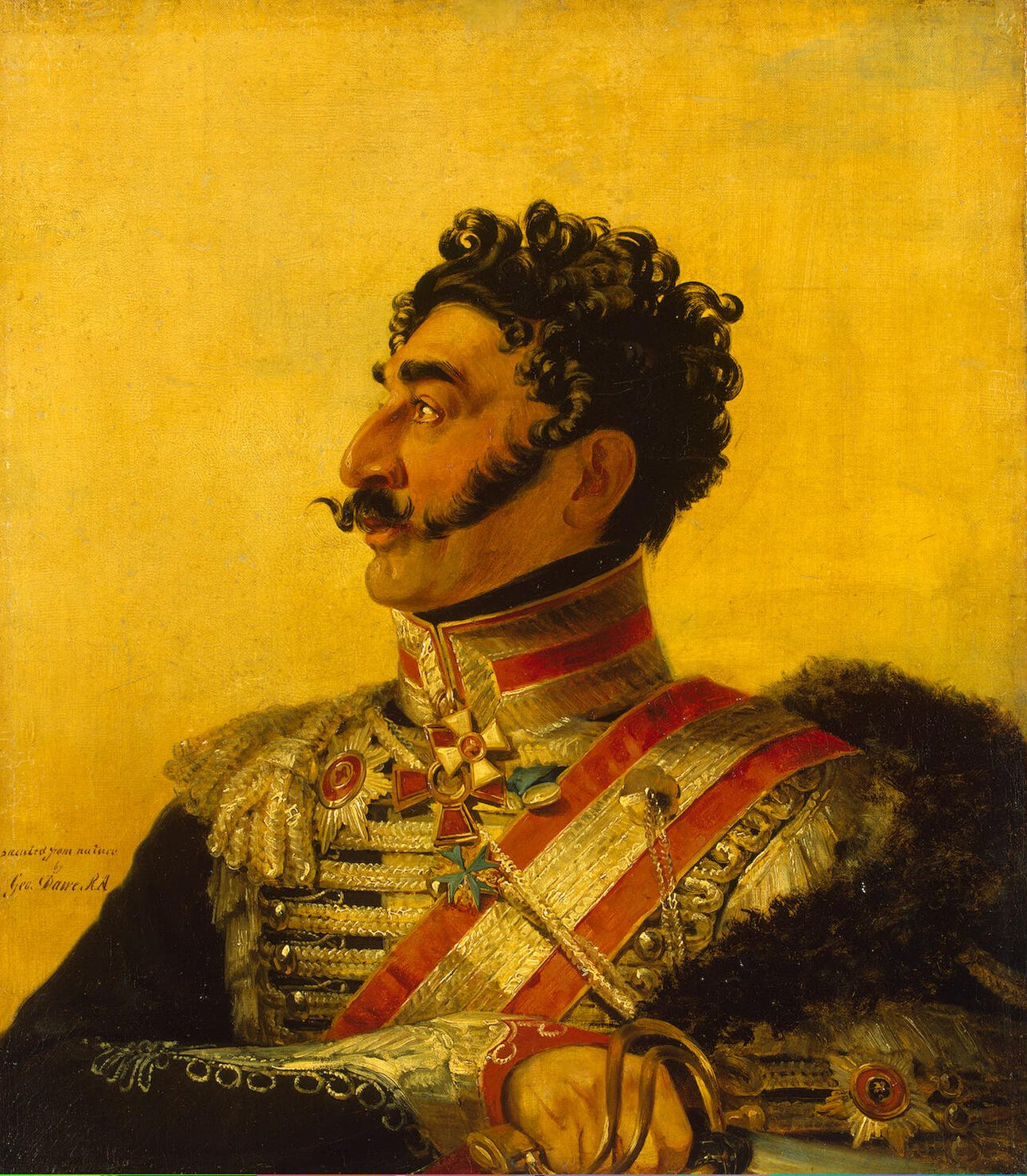
Valerian Madatov

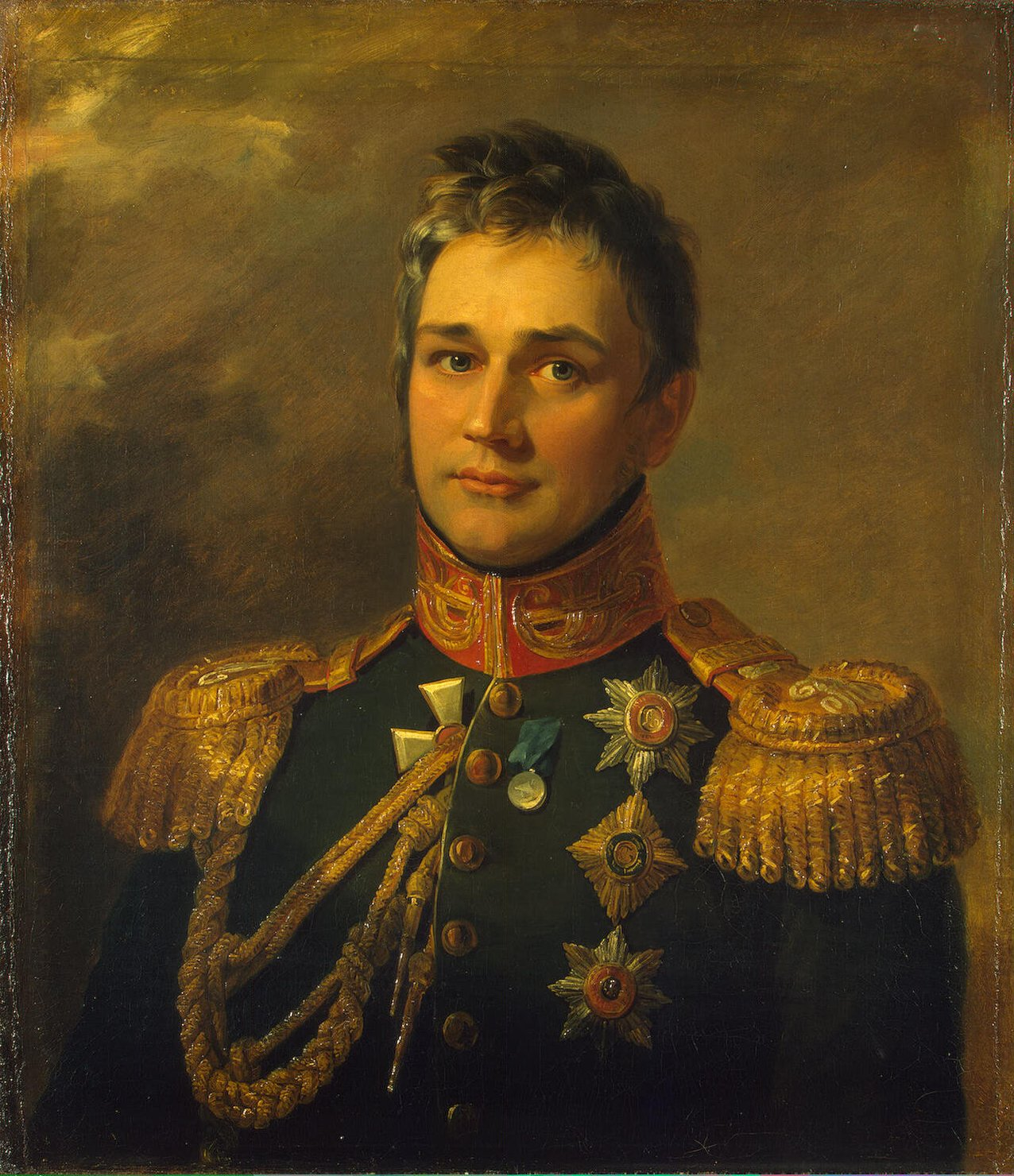
Mikhail Vorontsov

=== Other works ===
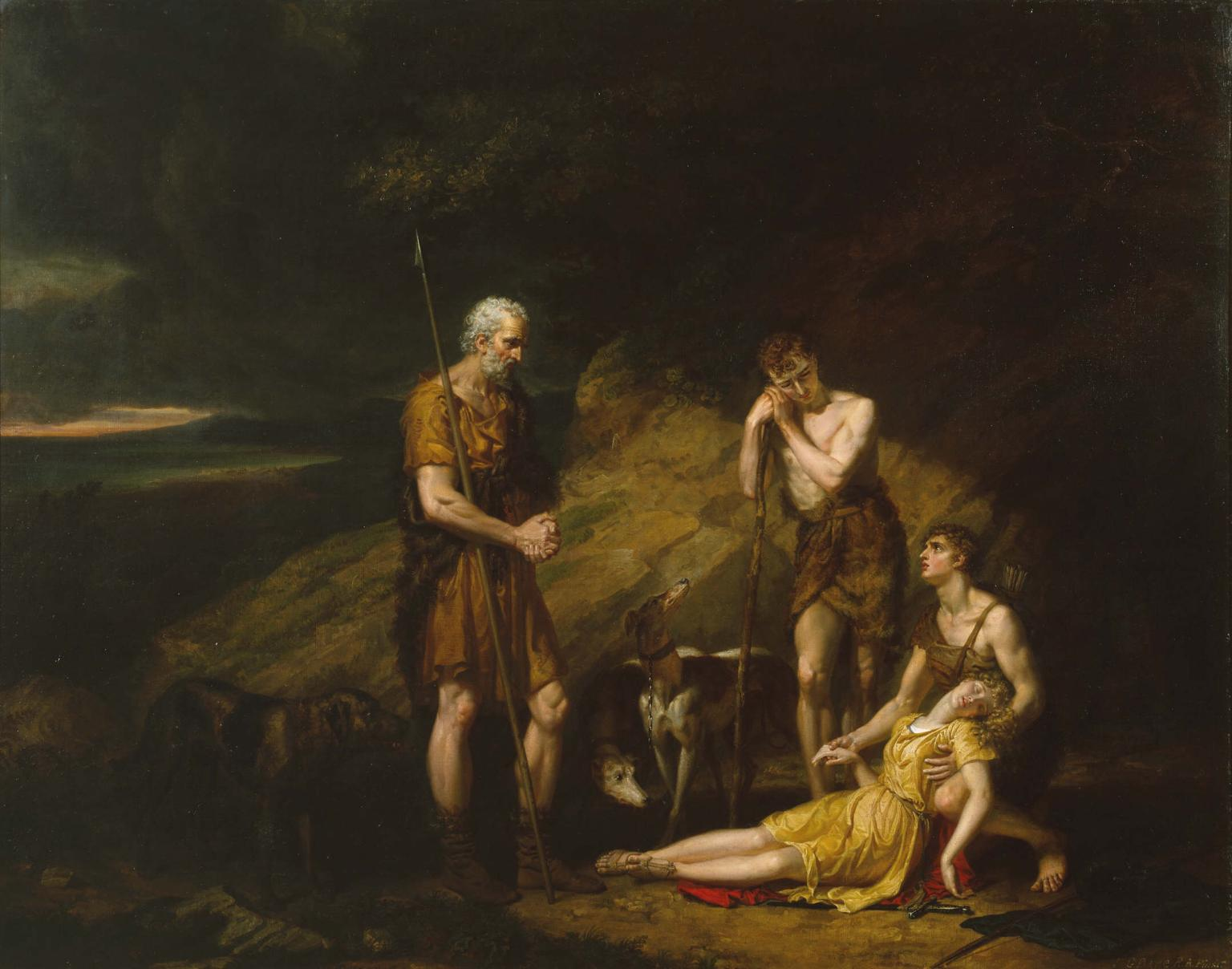
Imogen Found in the Cave of Belarius, 1809

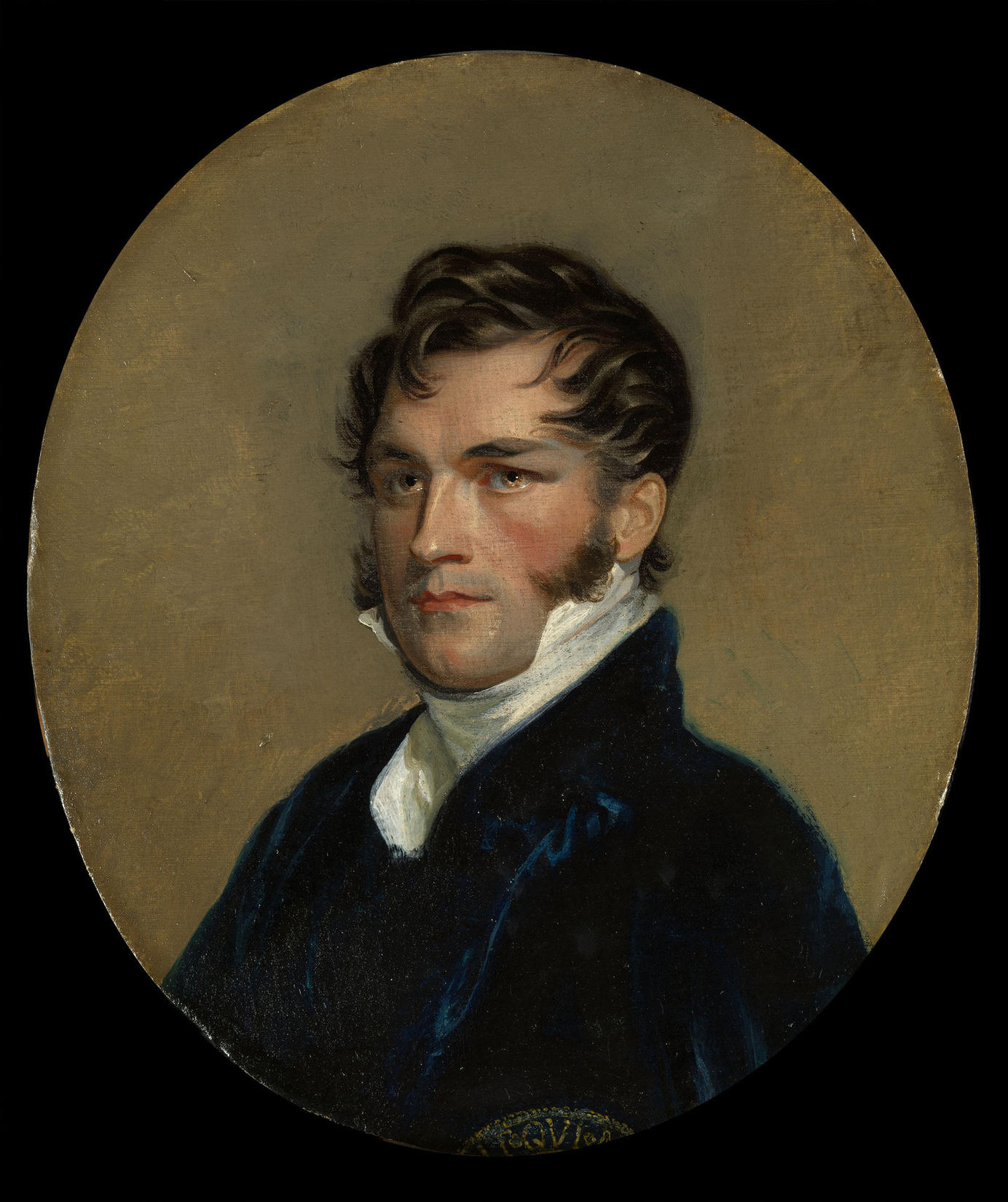
Leopold of Saxe-Coburg and Gotha, 1816

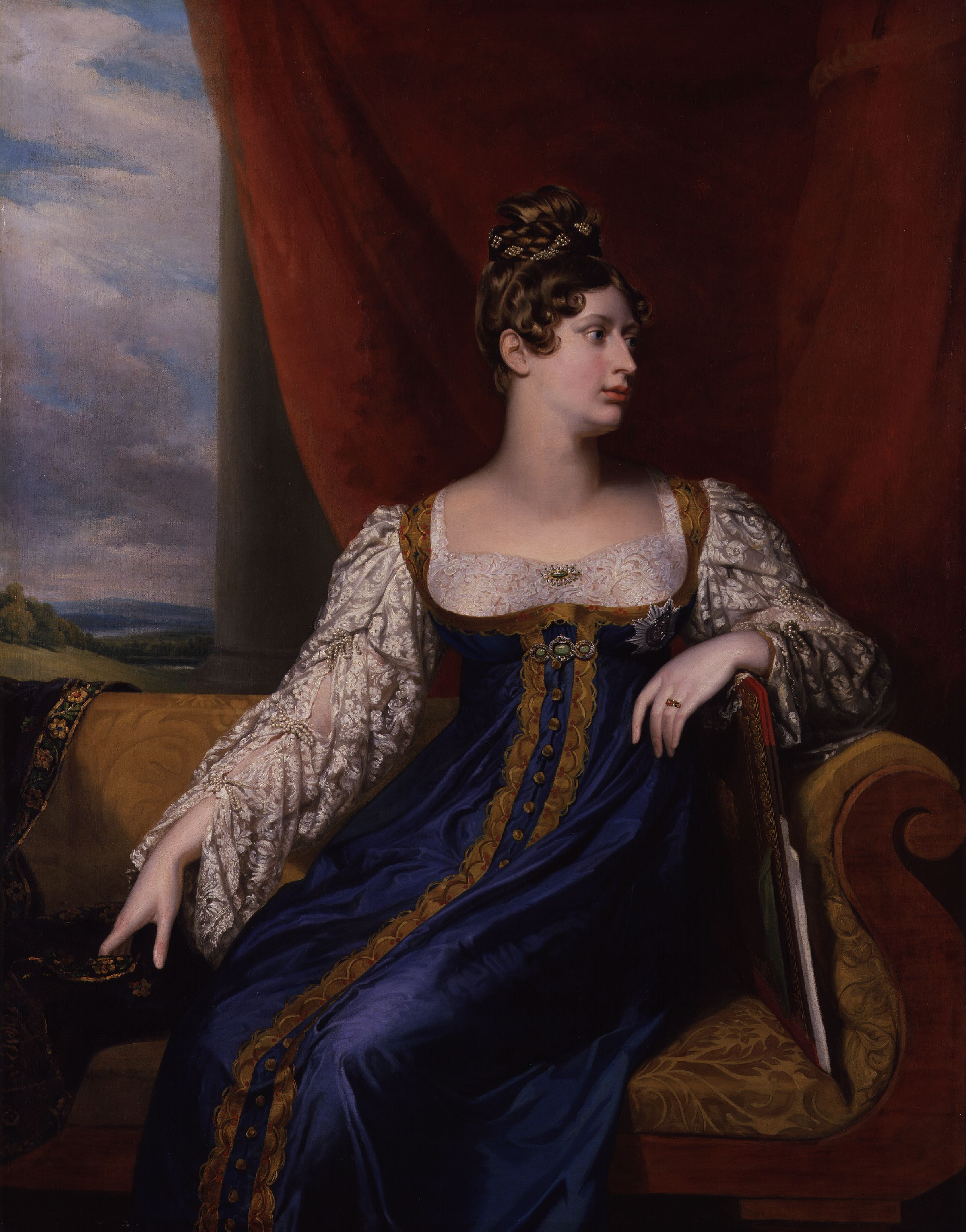
Portrait of Princess Charlotte of Wales, 1817

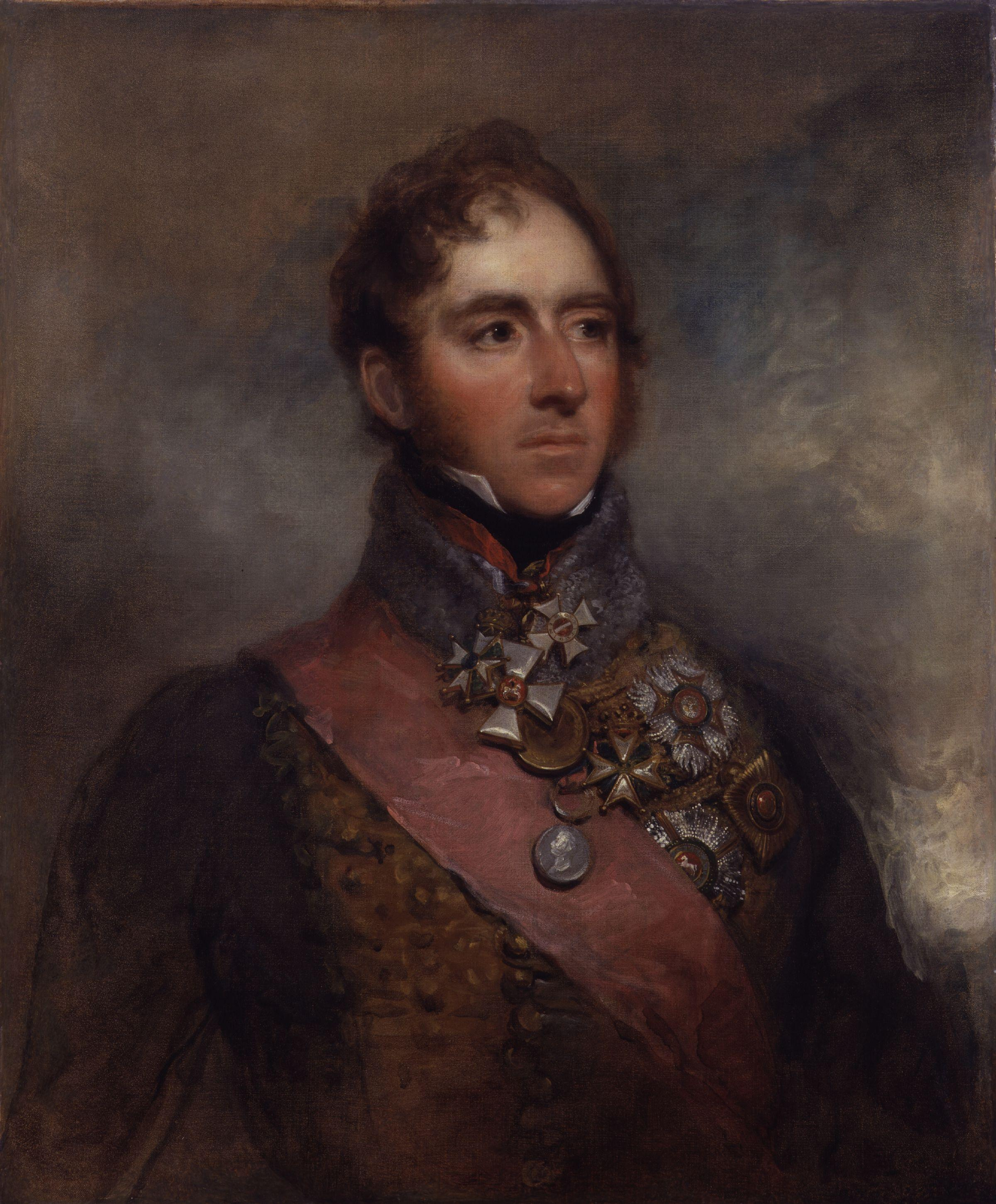
Marquess of Anglesey, c.1817

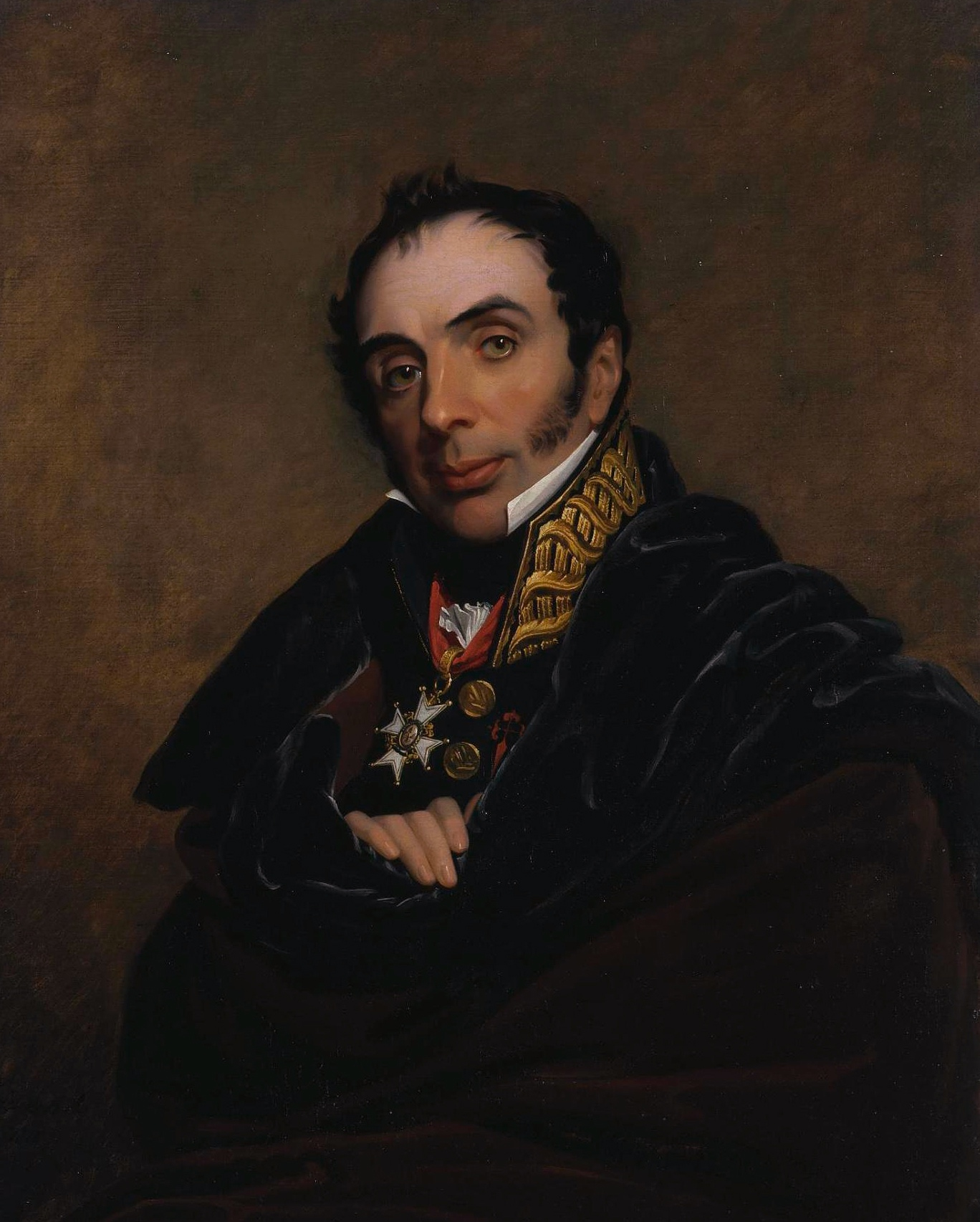
Miguel Ricardo de Álava, 1818

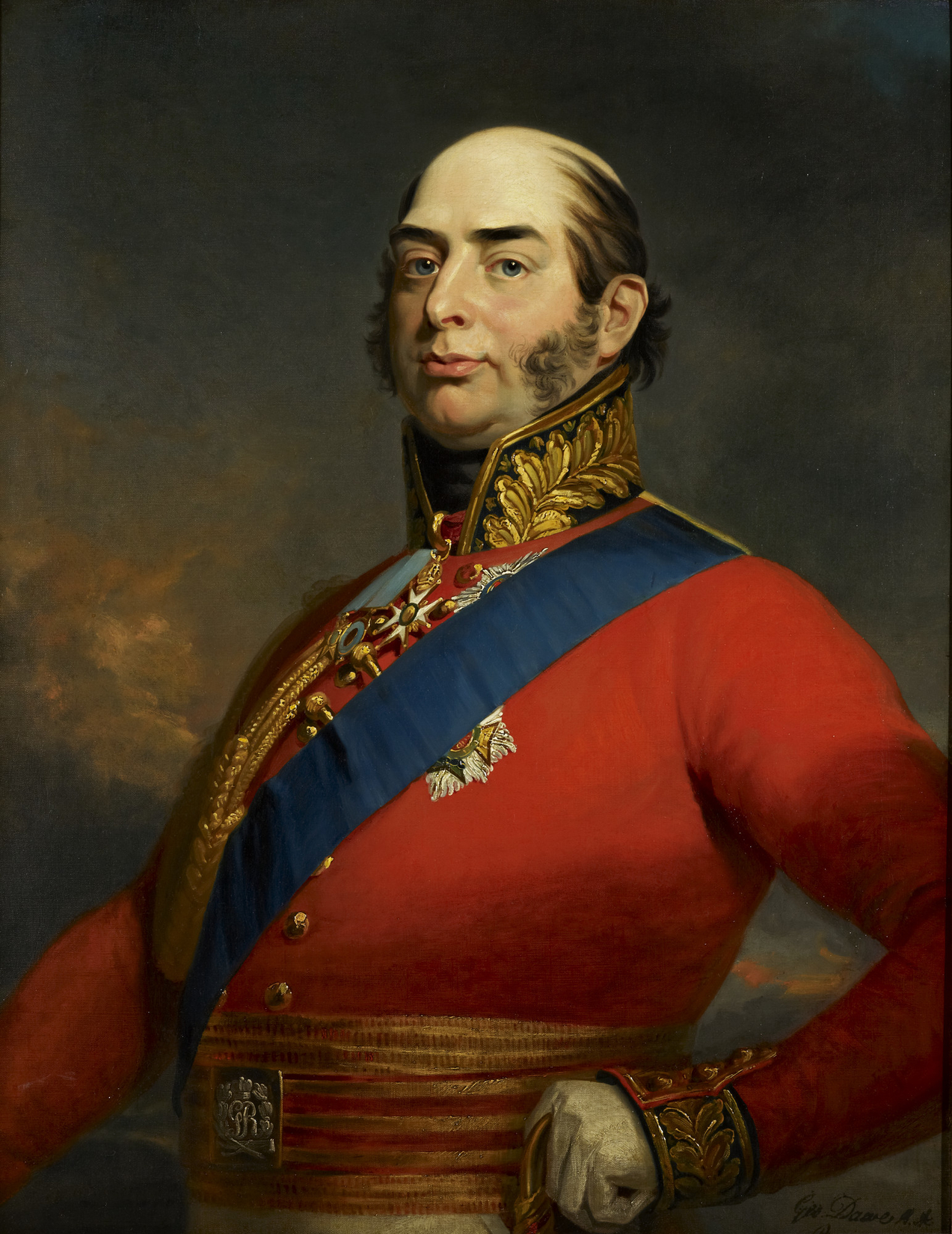
Edward, Duke of Kent, 1818

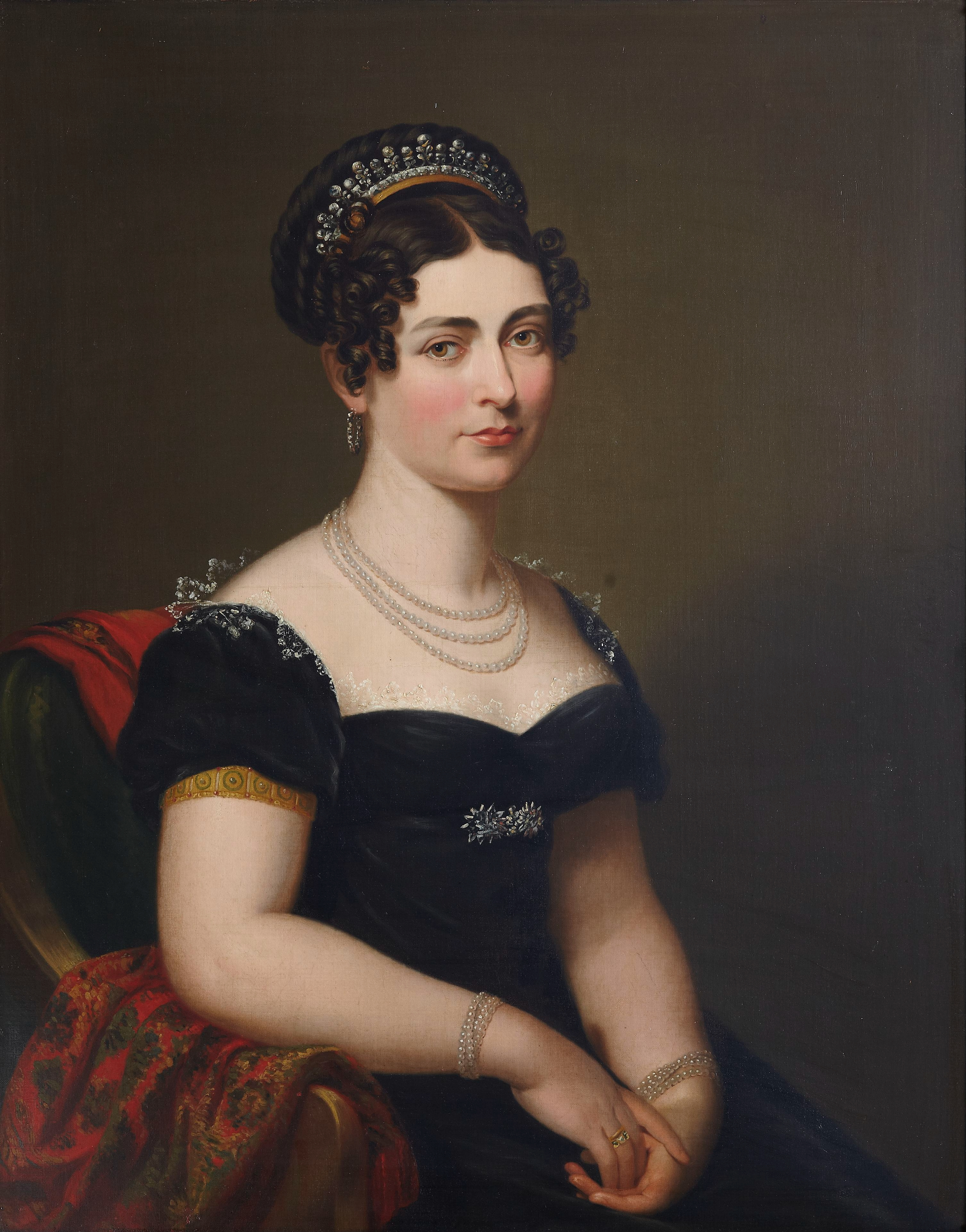
Victoria, Duchess of Kent, 1818

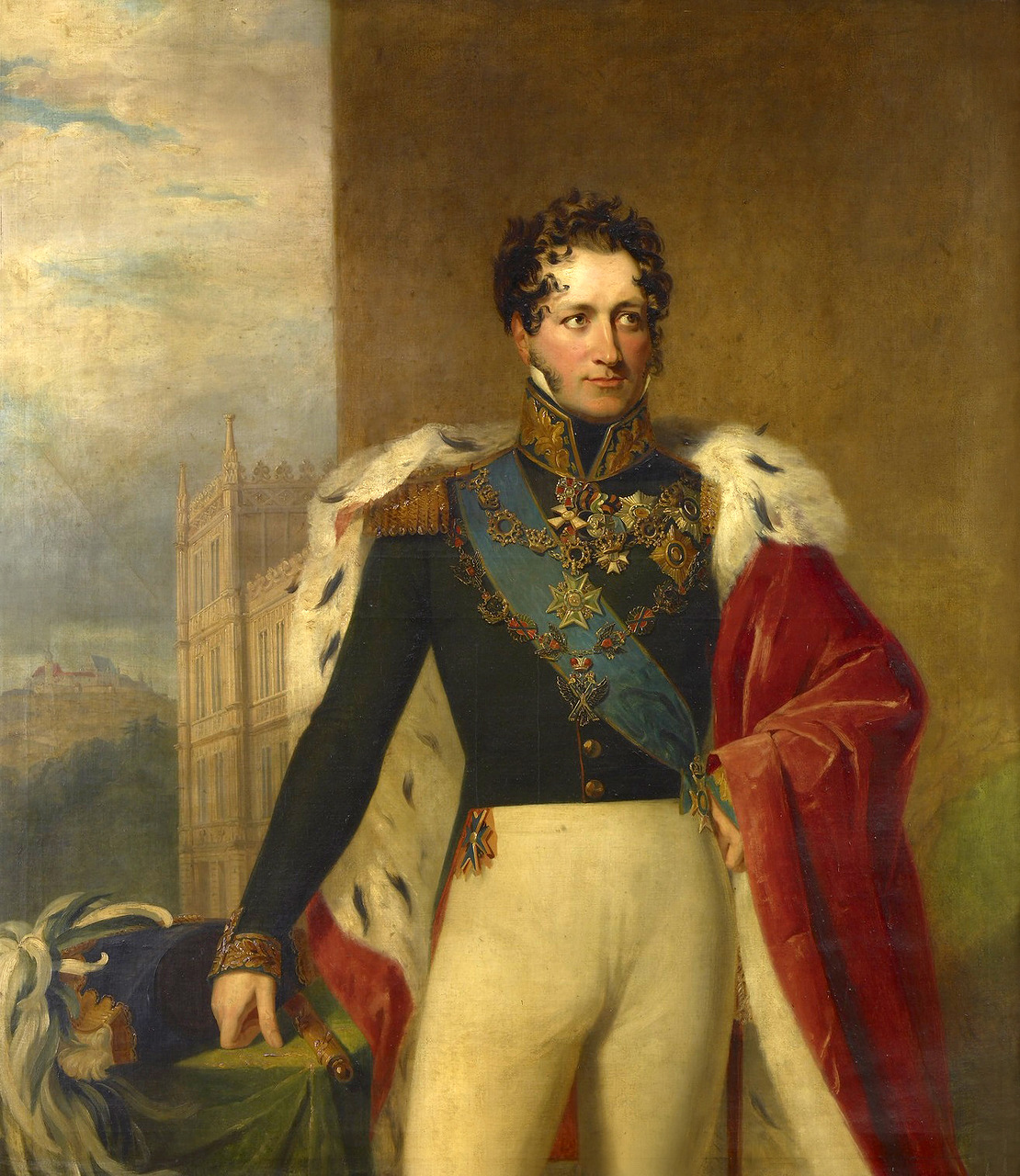
Ernest, Duke of Saxe-Coburg, 1819

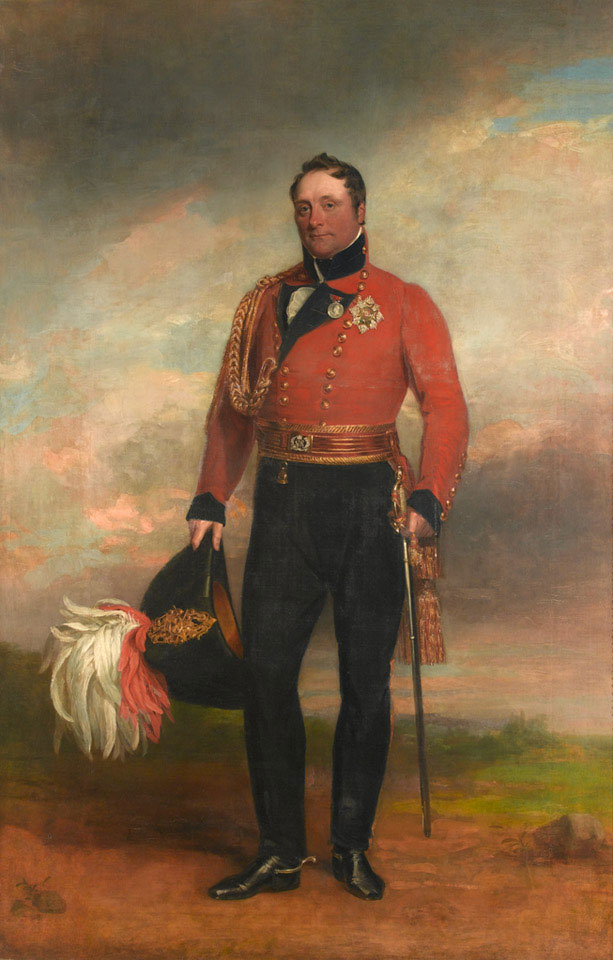
Rowland Hill, 1819

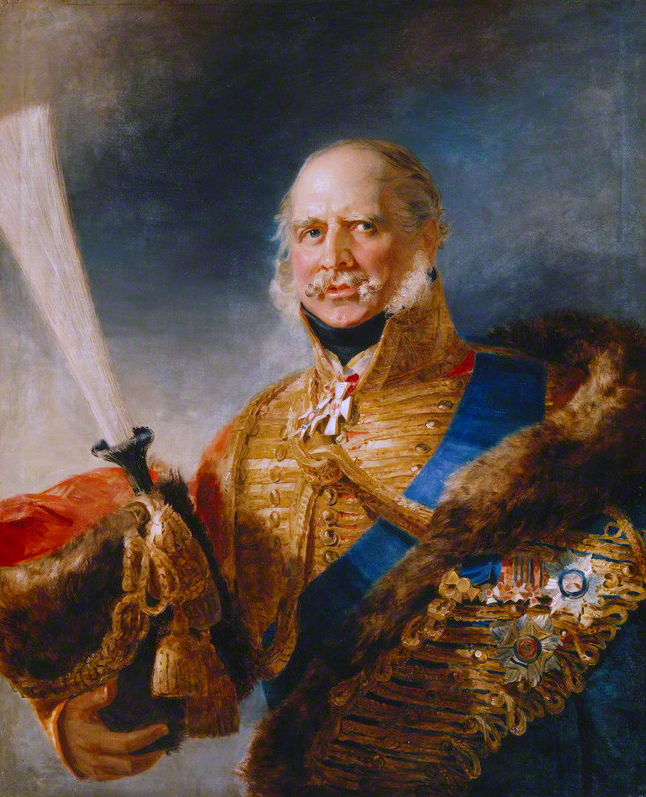
Ernest Augustus I of Hanover, c.1828

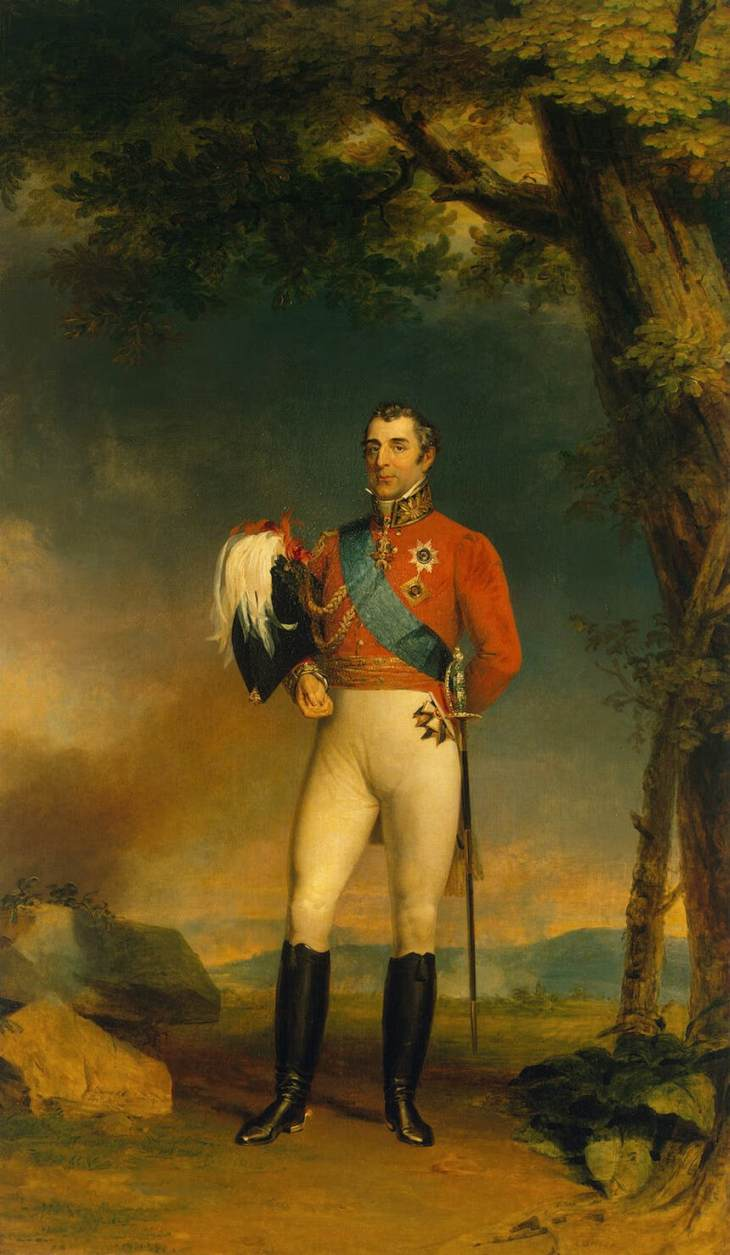
Duke of Wellington, 1829

== Sources ==
- "Дау, Джордж" . Brockhaus and Efron Encyclopedic Dictionary (in Russian). 1906.
- "Dawe, George". Grove Art Online. 2003.
- "Dawe, George". Benezit Dictionary of Artists. 2011.
