= Imogen Found in the Cave of Belarius =

Painting by George Dawe

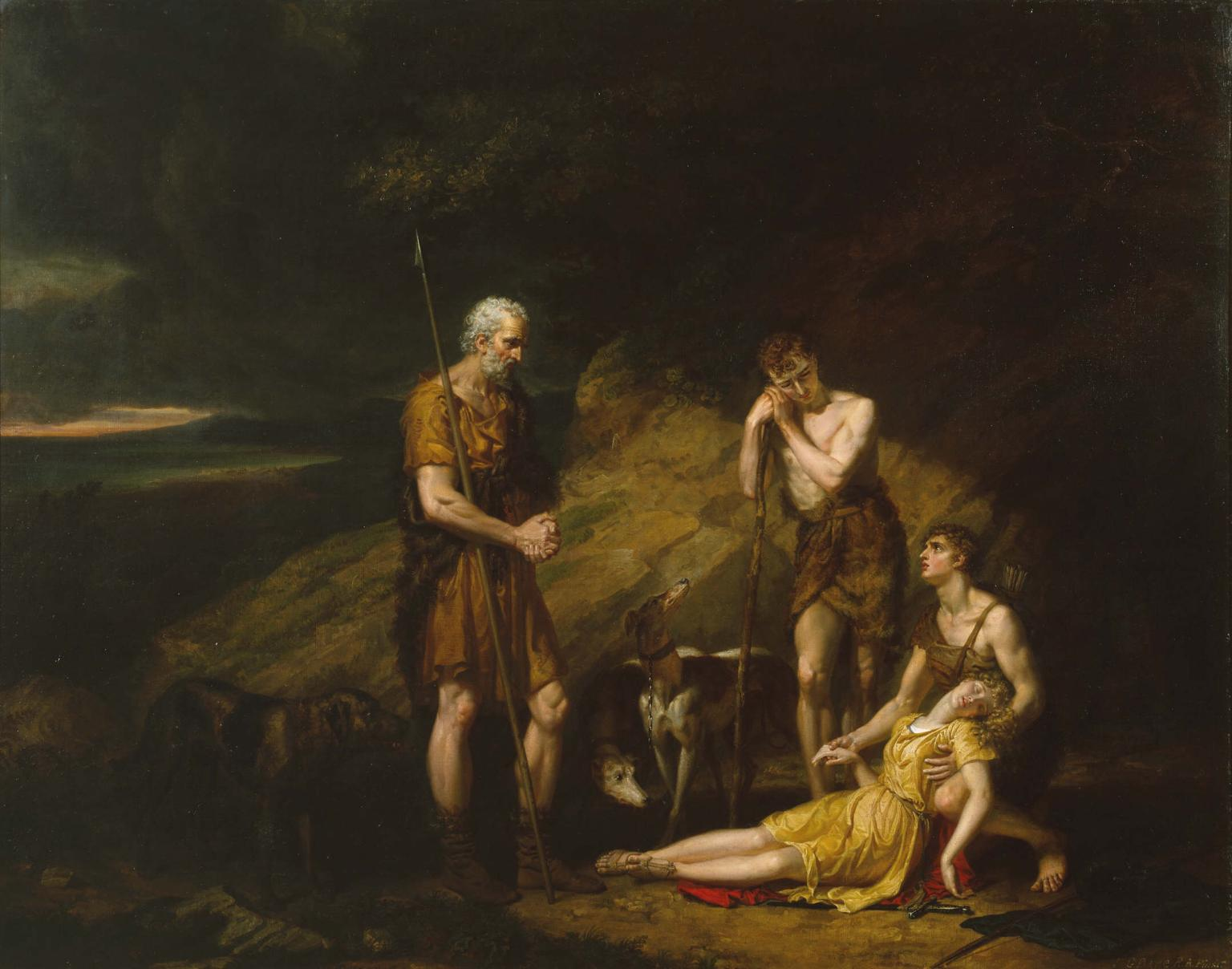
- Artist: George Dawe
- Year: 1809
- Type: Oil on canvas, history painting
- Dimensions: 100.3 cm × 127 cm (39.5 in × 50 in)
- Location: Tate Britain, London

Imogen Found in the Cave of Belarius is an oil painting by the English artist George Dawe, from 1809. It is held at the Tate Britain, in London.

It depicts a scene from William Shakespeare's play Cymbeline in which the heroine Imogen, daughter of Cymbeline, is discovered in a cave by Belarius and her two long-lost brothers. They assume she is dead, but in fact she has just taken a sleeping potion. While Dawe became best known for his portraits, this is a rare example of him venturing into history painting.

The painting was exhibited at the British Institution of 1809, a rival to the Royal Academy. Today it is in the collection of the Tate Britain, having been acquired in 1965.

== Bibliography ==
- Bury, Stephen (ed.) Benezit Dictionary of British Graphic Artists and Illustrators, Volume 1. OUP, 2012.
- Sillars, Stuart. Shakespeare Seen. Cambridge University Press, 2019.
