= Alexander Polyakov (artist) =

19th-century Russian painter

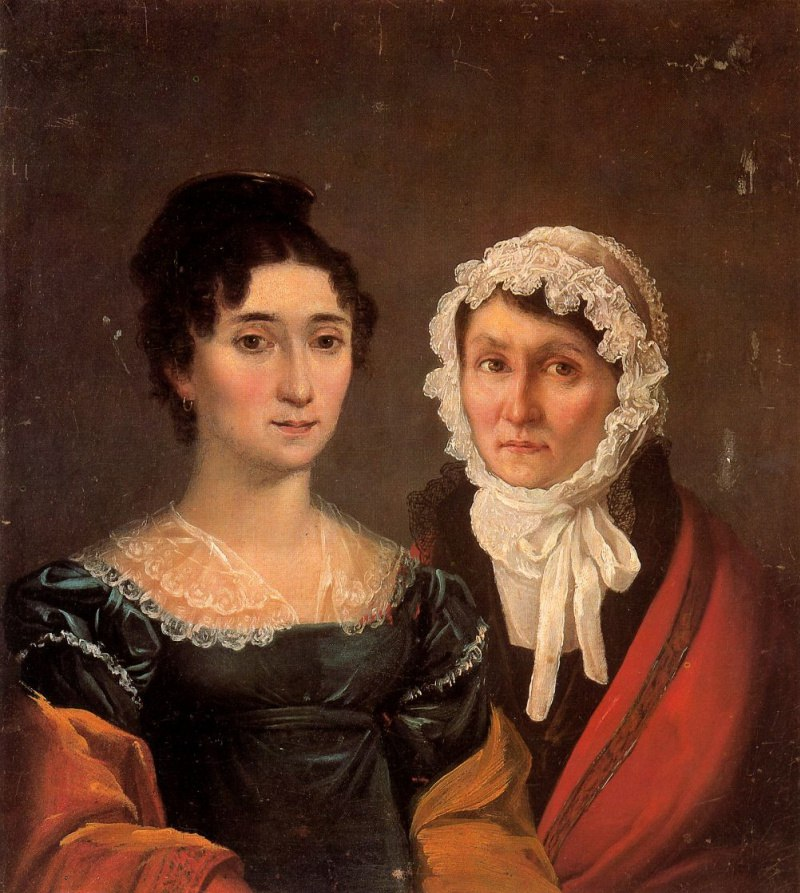
Maria Kornilova, wife of Pyotr Kornilov, and her mother, Maria Kulomzina

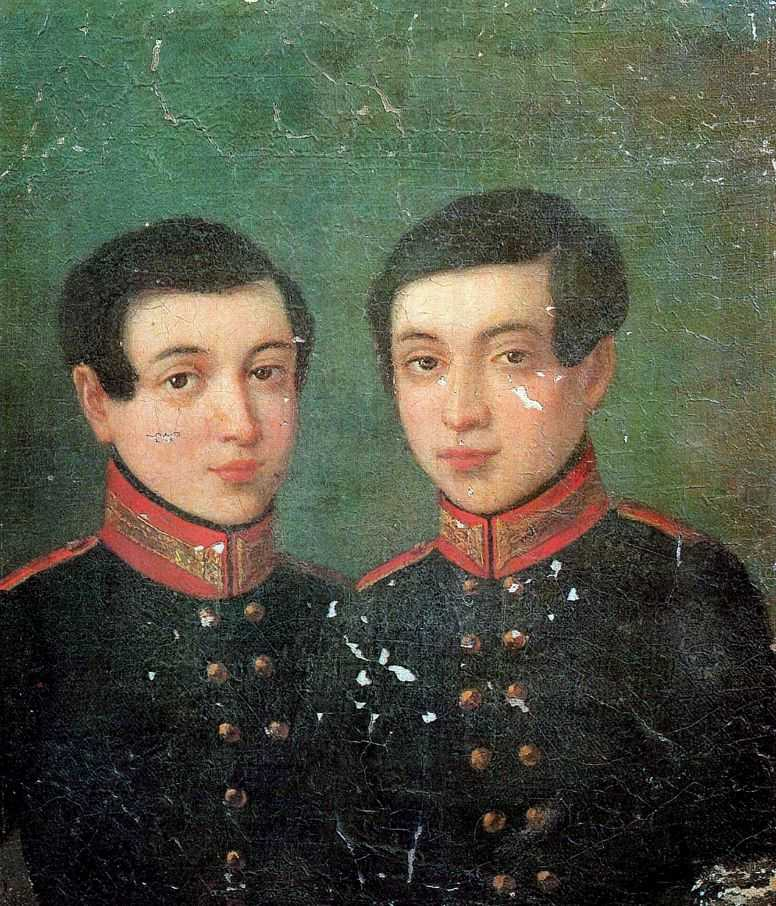
Arkady and Ivan Kornilov, Pyotr Kornilov's twin sons

Alexander Vasilievich Polyakov (Russian: Александр Васильевич Поляков; 1801, place unknown - 9 January 1835, St. Petersburg) was a Russian portrait painter.

== Biography ==
He was a serf attached to the estate of General Pyotr Yakovlevich Kornilov. In 1822, he was given to the English portrait painter, George Dawe, as an assistant. Under the agreement, he would "work and study" with Dawe, on the condition that he be allowed to attend evening classes at the Imperial Academy of Arts. His salary was set at 800 Rubles per year. It was later reported, by the Imperial Society for the Encouragement of the Arts, that Dawe gave him only 350 Rubles, using the other 450 for expenses. He also deducted pay for the days that Polyakov was ill which, due to his poor health, often left him with little.

Dawe was painting portraits of war heroes for the Military Gallery of the Winter Palace. The project lasted from 1822 to 1828, and over 300 portraits were created. Later examination suggests that many of these were painted by Polyakov and signed by Dawe. He may have also restored and improved a number of portraits that were hastily executed.

In 1833, thanks to a petition from his fellow artists, he was freed from serfdom. Alexey Olenin, the President of the Imperial Academy. signed a declaration elevating him to the status of "Free Artist". This was partly in recognition of the poor treatment he had received from Dawe. He was also given a monthly stipend of 30 Rubles, but this was barely enough for basic necessities, and he died in poverty at the age of thirty-four.

Among the works verified to be entirely his own are "Peter I at a Shipyard, with a View of Amsterdam" (1819), and a portrait of Tsar Nicholas I (1829). Other works may be seen at the State Historical Museum and the Kostroma Art Museum.
