= Hieronymus Ekziemplarski =

Archbishop of the Russian Orthodox Church (1836–1905)

- Archbishop of Warsaw and the Vistula
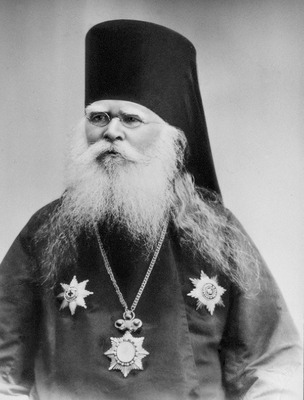
- Church: Russian Orthodox Church
- Diocese: Eparchy of Warsaw
- In office: 16 June 1905 – 2 November 1905
- Predecessor: Flavian Gorodetsky
- Successor: Nikanor Kamensky

Orders
- Ordination: 19 September 1871
- Consecration: 3 November 1885 by Plato Gorodiecki

Personal details
- Born: Ilya Ekziemplarski; 20 July 1836 Dmitriyevy Gory
- Died: 2 November 1905 (aged 69) Warsaw
- Buried: St. John Climacus's Orthodox Church, Warsaw
- Denomination: Eastern Orthodoxy
- Education: Kyiv Theological Academy

Hieronymus, secular name Ilya Tikhonovich Ekziemplarski, (born 20 July 1836 in Dmitriyevy Gory, died 2 November 1905 in Warsaw) was an archbishop of the Russian Orthodox Church.

Hieronymus came from a family of Orthodox priests. He graduated from the theological seminary in Vladimir and then from the Kyiv Theological Academy. After obtaining his degree in theological sciences in 1861, he was employed as a lecturer at the theological seminary in Kyiv, specializing in pedagogy and homiletics. He was ordained a priest in 1871 as a married man. He served in Kyiv and was also a catechist in various schools in the city. In 1885, nine years after his wife's death, he took permanent monastic vows, adopting the monastic name Hieronymus. Later that year, he was consecrated as the bishop of Chehrin, a vicar of the Kyiv eparchy. From 1890 to 1894, he was the ordinary of the Russian Orthodox Diocese of Lithuania, from 1894 to 1898 of the Eparchy of Warsaw, and then for seven years he headed the Eparchy of Chełm and Warsaw, and in the last months of his life, the Eparchy of Warsaw and the Vistula.

In all the eparchies he managed, he conducted extensive charitable activities, supporting orphanages, charitable societies, and schools. He was also interested in the functioning of monasteries and Orthodox press, the education of church singers, and he consecrated new sacred objects. As the archbishop of Chełm and Warsaw, he promoted Orthodoxy among resistant Uniate communities and their Russification. He unsuccessfully sought the abolition of the Archdiocese of Lublin, whose clergy, in his opinion, spread anti-Orthodox views among former Uniates and strengthened their resistance against the actions of the Tsarist authorities. He also called on the Orthodox clergy to be more active in working with resistant Uniates, and from 1902 he sought the establishment of the Eparchy of Chełm.

He died in 1905, and was buried in St. John Climacus's Orthodox Church in Warsaw, which he constructed at his own expense, planning to make it a family tomb. He was the only Orthodox bishop of Warsaw in the jurisdiction of the Russian Orthodox Church who died while in office and was buried in Warsaw.

== Biography ==
=== Childhood and family ===
He was the son of the Orthodox priest Tikhon Ivanovich Ekziemplarski and his wife Anna Stepanovna, who came from the priestly family of the Stepans. His father served as the parish priest in Dmitriyevy Gory in Vladimir Governorate since 1821, taking over the parish from his father-in-law, who was unable to continue his priestly duties due to blindness. He received his surname while studying at the theological seminary. The Ekziemplarski family was not wealthy; to make a living, the future archbishop's father had to combine pastoral service with work on the farm. The future hierarch had older brothers, Konstantin and Fiodor, as well as sisters Maria and Praskovya. Three children who were born before him – Alexandr, Pavel, and Dmitri – died prematurely. After him, two daughters, Evdokiya and Yelena, and a son, Ivan, were born.

Ilya Ekziemplarski was born on 20 July 1836, on the day commemorating the prophet Elijah, which determined the choice of his name. He was baptized on the same day by his uncle, Varsonofyi Stepanov; his godparents were his older sister, 12-year-old Maria Ekziemplarska, and his cousin, Ivan Valedinski, a student at the theological seminary. The boy was raised in a deeply religious atmosphere, with his father preparing him for future priestly service from an early age. At the age of nine – one year later than prescribed by the rules (previously, his parents were concerned that the boy was too weak in health) – he was sent to a lower theological school in Vladimir.

=== Youth and academic activity ===
After finishing his studies at the theological school in 1852, Ilya Ekziemplarski entered the seminary in the same city, which he completed in 1857. During his studies, he was a tenor soloist in the choir of the Diocese of Vladimir. He then pursued theological studies at the Kyiv Theological Academy, graduating in 1861 as one of the top students. In October of the same year, he was hired at the theological seminary in Chernihiv as a lecturer in biblical history, liturgics, and canon law. A few days after the initial decision regarding his employment in Chernihiv was made, it was changed, and Iljya Ekziemplarski became a lecturer in church history, general history, biblical history, canon law, and liturgics at the theological seminary in Kyiv.

On 4 February 1862, he married A. Pilipieyeva, an orphan of a professor at the theological seminary in Kyiv. In 1864, he briefly served as an assistant inspector at the seminary. Two years later, he was appointed the head of the Sunday school at the seminary and the chair of pedagogy, later becoming the chair of homiletics. His particular areas of interest included reading and writing pedagogy, the mother tongue, arithmetic, history and geography, singing, and religious instruction. He developed a textbook on pedagogy for the theological seminary. From 1867 to 1885, he taught pedagogy, and from 1869 to 1885, he also taught history at a girls' school for daughters of clergymen.

He regularly published in the journal Rukowodstwo dla sielskich pastyriej. His articles covered topics related to pedagogy, history, and current affairs. From 1863 to 1870, he served as acting secretary of the editorial board, and in 1870, he became an assistant editor, also responsible for the bibliography section. His texts were also printed in the publications Kijewskije Jeparchialnyje Wiedomosti, Woskriesnoje cztienije, and Kijewlanin. On 30 June 1870, he received the academic degree of Master of Theology for his overall scholarly work.

=== Priestly service in the Kyiv eparchy ===
When Ilya Ekziemplarski's wife became gravely ill, he made a private vow to dedicate the rest of his life to the service of the Orthodox Church if she recovered. On 14 September 1871, he was ordained a deacon, and five days later, he was ordained a priest by Metropolitan Arsenius of Kyiv. The hierarch assigned him to serve at the school church of St. Paul at the Pavlo Galagan Collegium and entrusted him with the positions of catechist and mentor to the students of the collegium. Father Ekziemplarski also became a catechist at Kyiv's First Gymnasium, the women's gymnasium under the Ministry of Education, and the Fundukliev Women's Gymnasium. In addition, he served as the private catechist to the children of Kyiv's Governor-General Aleksandr Dondukov-Korsakov and P. Antonovich, the superintendent of the Kyiv school district. He co-founded the Kyiv shelter for the blind. In 1872 and 1873, Father Ekziemplarski received offers to become the rector of the theological seminaries in Chernihiv and later Simferopol, but he declined both offers.

On 1 September 1876, his wife died, leaving him to care for their five children, ranging in age from fourteen to one and a half years old. Ilya Ekziemplarski continued his priestly service as a married priest. In 1877, he was honored with the title of protoiereus, and in 1882, he became the dean of churches in the Podil district of Kyiv. In 1885, after his youngest son entered the gymnasium, and upon the advice of Metropolitan Plato of Kyiv, he decided to take monastic vows. His tonsure was performed on 27 July of that year by Archimandrite Juvenaly, the abbot of the Kyiv Pechersk Lavra, in the Church of St. Anthony within the Lavra complex. He took the monastic name Hieronymus. The following day, Metropolitan Plato elevated him to the rank of archimandrite and appointed him the abbot of the St. Michael's Golden-Domed Monastery in Kyiv.

=== Bishop ===
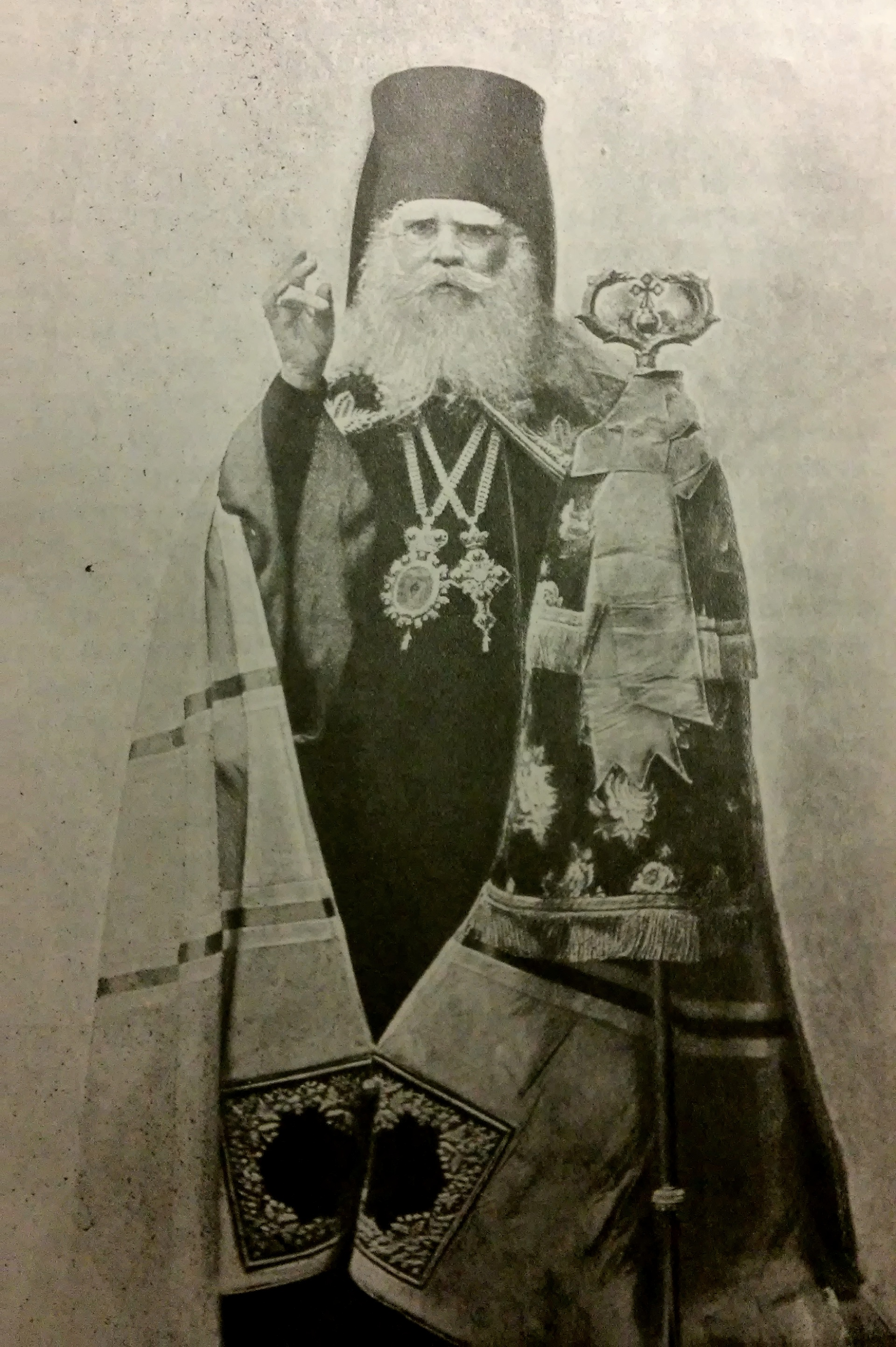
Hieronymus Ekziemplarski as bishop

On 3 November 1885, in the Saint Sophia Cathedral in Kyiv, Hieronymus was consecrated as a bishop by Metropolitan Plato of Kyiv. He was appointed as an auxiliary bishop of the Kyiv eparchy with the title Bishop of Chehryn, while retaining his previous duties at the Monastery of St. Michael the Archangel. As a bishop, Hieronymus was also responsible for overseeing religious education in schools within the Kyiv eparchy, managing the Brotherhood of the Epiphany at the Kyiv Theological Academy, and supervising parish schools.

In 1886, Bishop Hieronymus established a free school for church singers at the Monastery of St. Michael the Archangel, personally donating funds for its establishment. Two years later, he initiated an extensive renovation of the entire monastery. The renovation included replacing the iconostasis in the main cathedral, installing radiators, replacing windows and flooring, uncovering historical frescoes, and restoring the refectory church as well as the smaller Church of the Holy Spirit. During the 1890s, new residential buildings were erected in the monastery complex, and the pilgrim house was expanded. However, during this time, relations between Bishop Hieronymus and Metropolitan Plato of Kyiv deteriorated due to slander against the Bishop of Chehryn. Despite this, Hieronymus received strong support from Konstantin Pobedonostsev, the Chief Procurator of the Most Holy Synod, as well as Metropolitan Leonty of Moscow and Kolomna.

==== Bishop of Tambov and Shatsk ====
On 3 June 1890, the former auxiliary bishop of the Kyiv eparchy was appointed as the ruling bishop of the Eparchy of Tambov and Shatsk. During the famine between 1891 and 1892, Bishop Hieronymus made a significant financial contribution to the relief committee that organized aid for famine victims. He established a network of soup kitchens for the poor and founded two orphanages that cared for 100 children. He also played a key role during the cholera epidemic, distributing medicine and pamphlets on preventing the disease. In 1890, he opened a school for church singers at his episcopal residence, which was converted two years later into a school for missionaries and psalmists. In 1891, he organized an eparchial candle factory.

That same year, Hieronymus outlined a comprehensive reform program for the eparchy in the Tambov Diocesan News. He proposed the establishment of new parish schools, the organization of religious discussions outside of services, and the formation of temperance societies at various pastoral centers. He also instructed all parish priests to teach their parishioners the Ten Commandments by the end of 1891 and encouraged choir directors and singers to use traditional church melodies or their modern adaptations. Additionally, he recommended that parishioners be taught to sing communally during services. In 1891, Hieronymus initiated the establishment of a branch of the Missionary Brotherhood of Our Lady of Kazan in every county of the Tambov province. Two years later, he opened a shelter for elderly priests, widows of clergymen, and church servants. Another initiative of Bishop Hieronymus was the formation of an association to support poor students of the Tambov Theological Seminary, and in 1893, he transformed the eparchy's monthly publication into a weekly newspaper. The following year, he began the construction of a new seminary building and spiritual school in Tambov. He regularly visited various parishes in the eparchy, as well as the Tambov Seminary and local prisons.

Bishop Hieronymus made particular efforts to improve the spiritual life in the monasteries of his eparchy, where he noticed many violations of monastic discipline and low levels of theological knowledge. In 1892 and 1893, he organized meetings of the superiors of the men's and women's monasteries. He introduced communal singing for all monks and nuns, required members of monastic communities to read spiritual literature, and prohibited nuns from renting rooms in monasteries to women unrelated to the community. At the Ascension Monastery in Tambov, he opened a shelter for elderly nuns and initiated the monastery's expansion. Similar efforts were undertaken at the Monasteries of St. Demetrius and St. Hilarion.

In 1894, Bishop Hieronymus conducted the funeral of the widely respected monk Theophan the Recluse at the Dormition Monastery in Vysha. Two years earlier, a commission he had established examined the evidence of miracles attributed to Monk Seraphim of Sarov, who was canonized in 1903.

Bishop Hieronymus's daughter was also involved in educational development, founding a school for 200 girls in Tambov.

==== Bishop of Vilnius and Lithuania ====
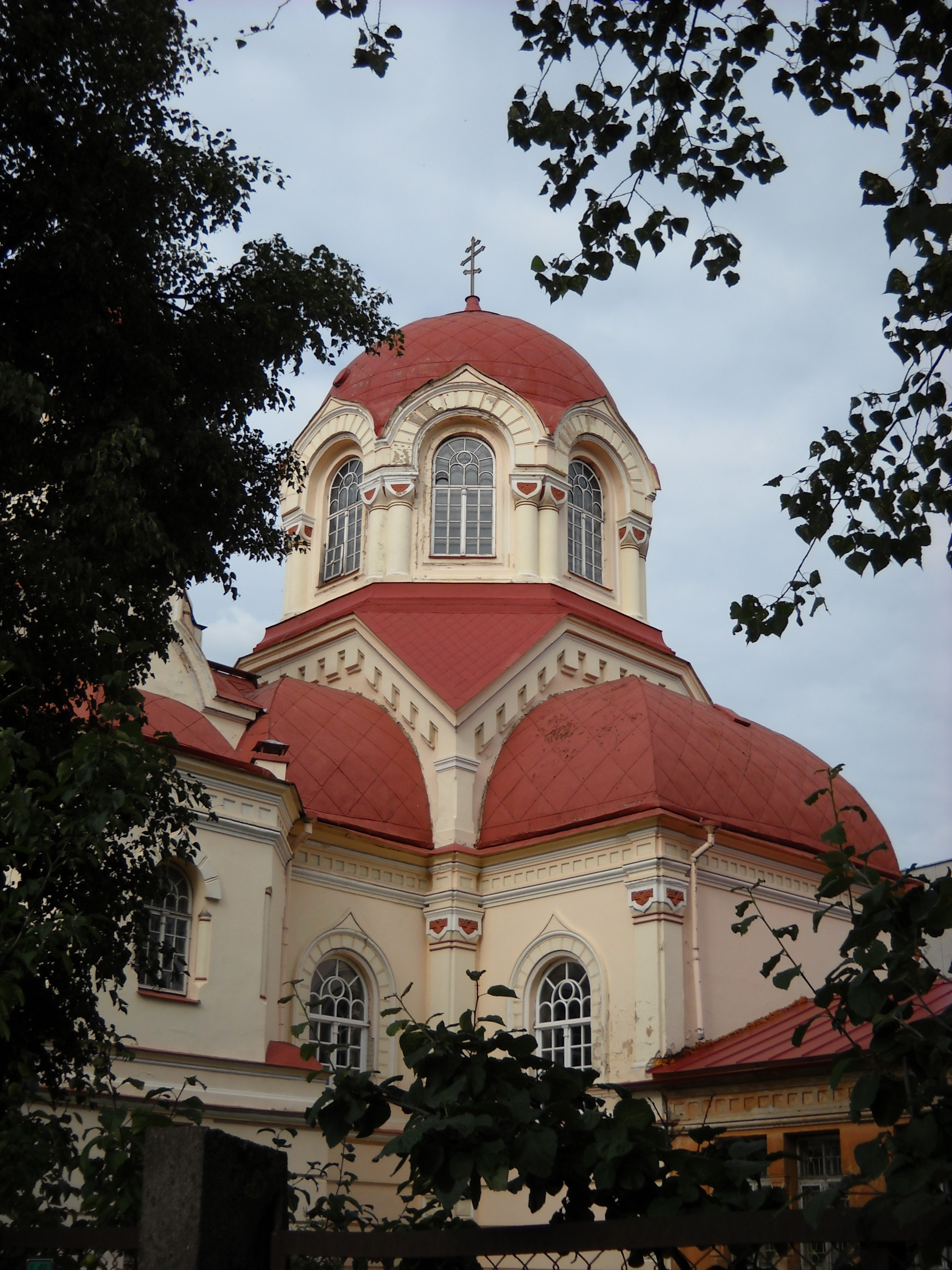
Church of St. Michael the Archangel in Vilnius, built on the initiative of Archbishop Hieronymus

In April 1894, Bishop Hieronymus was transferred to the Diocese of Vilnius and Lithuania, and a year later, he was elevated to the rank of archbishop. In Vilnius, he became the head of the Brotherhood of the Holy Spirit and established a printing press for it. He also founded an association to provide assistance to poor students of local theological schools. His sermons were frequently published in the diocesan press. At his initiative, two churches were built in Vilnius: the Church of St. Michael the Archangel and the Church of St. Alexander Nevsky. In 1895, he opened a three-class school at the Monastery of St. Mary Magdalene in Vilnius, as well as a parish school and the Brotherhood of Saints Peter and Paul at the Church of St. Michael the Archangel in Kaunas. Two years later, he established a school for psalmists and church choir teachers. In total, Archbishop Hieronymus donated 70,000 rubles to various initiatives undertaken by the diocese.

==== Archbishop of Warsaw ====
In 1898, Hieronymus was appointed Archbishop of Chełm and Warsaw. In this role, he continued the work of his predecessors, focusing on the construction of new Orthodox churches, both for civilians and the military. From December 1900 to May 1901, he participated in the meetings of the Most Holy Synod in St. Petersburg. On 7 October 1901, in Tomaszów Lubelski, he welcomed Tsar Nicholas II and Empress Alexandra Feodorovna at the consecration of the Church of St. Nicholas.

Hieronymus also sought to firmly establish Orthodoxy in the former Uniate Chełm Eparchy. In 1902, he proposed to the Russian authorities the dissolution of the Latin Archdiocese of Lublin to prevent Catholic clergy from influencing former Uniates, but the proposal was rejected by the Tsar, who sought to avoid further tensions with the Pope. In March of the same year, Hieronymus was one of the initiators of a meeting with the Ministers of the Interior, Justice, War, and Finance, along with the Ober-Procurator of the Most Holy Synod, Konstantin Pobedonostsev, during which they discussed the project of creating the Kholm Governorate and implementing special legislation favoring the Orthodox in that region. This proposal was also rejected, with only Warsaw Governor-General Mikhail Chertkov tasked with making special efforts to further consolidate Orthodoxy among the former Uniates and to russify them. At the request of the governor-general, Archbishop Hieronymus presented his position on the matter and suggestions for further action. The hierarch's opinion did not differ from the assessments made by representatives of the Tsarist administration. The cleric believed that the issue of the Uniates was both a religious and political matter, as it was being used by Polish national activists for anti-Russian activities. Consequently, Tsarist authorities should act in a similar manner. Hieronymus concluded that their task was to implement "a firm and unwavering policy towards the Uniate issue (...), [so that] all authorities in the former Uniate territories would wholeheartedly, genuinely, and consistently serve and support the Orthodox-Russian idea".

Among the measures suggested by the hierarch were: banning the organization of Catholic holidays on days that coincided with Orthodox celebrations, encouraging local Orthodox believers to make pilgrimages to well-known sanctuaries (such as the Pochaiv Lavra and the Kyiv Pechersk Lavra), making the Julian calendar the only official one, punishing former Uniates who did not attend Orthodox services, as well as supporting Russian-language education and granting state loans to Orthodox peasants. Hieronymus also proposed the creation of a separate Chełm eparchy and raising Chełm's status as a religious center.

At the same time, he was aware that the highest government circles were considering a more tolerant policy, including a proposal to re-legalize the Uniate Church. He was also concerned by rumors of a planned uprising in the Kingdom of Poland and the growth of the socialist movement. In 1904, when Catholic churches in Warsaw held celebrations marking the 50th anniversary of the proclamation of the dogma of the Immaculate Conception of Mary, he ordered special services in Orthodox churches and the delivery of anti-Catholic sermons. Nevertheless, his attitude toward Catholicism was less hostile than that of Bishop Eulogius Georgiyevsky of Lublin. To strengthen and promote Orthodoxy, he primarily called on the clergy under his authority to engage in active work.

After the issuance of the 1905 Edict of Toleration, which allowed people to abandon Orthodoxy, mass conversions of former Uniates to Latin-rite Catholicism began in the Eparchy of Chełm and Warsaw. Archbishop Hieronymus sought to counteract these conversions primarily by issuing proclamations to the faithful and clergy. His age and health, however, prevented him from undertaking broader efforts, such as parish visitations.

In his first proclamation, published on 12 May 1905, he acknowledged that the edict was met with joy by those who had been previously forced to adopt Orthodoxy, and that the Russian Orthodox Church would no longer be accused of persecuting other faiths. At the same time, he wrote that Orthodox believers were now particularly vulnerable to false teachings. He claimed that in the past, similar circumstances had led to attempts to persuade Orthodox Christians to abandon their faith. He viewed the 1875 liquidation of the Uniate Chełm diocese positively, while omitting the issue of imposing Orthodoxy and the repression of those who resisted. Nevertheless, he called on Orthodox clergy to engage in interfaith debates using "love and truth" as their main tools. By the end of May, he had issued two more leaflets addressed to the faithful, encouraging them to remain steadfast in their faith, and refuted rumors of the Tsar converting to Catholicism or of the restoration of the Polish state. At the same time, Hieronymus remained in contact with the Ober-Procurator of the Most Holy Synod. In his letters to him, he accused Roman Catholic clergy of intimidating Orthodox believers, asserting that Catholic agitation was the main cause of the mass conversions. However, he opposed the use of coercion against those who were reluctant to embrace Orthodoxy. In addition to his proclamations on the Uniate issue, in October 1905, Hieronymus issued another statement to the clergy and the faithful concerning the revolutionary events taking place at the time.

Similarly to his previous dioceses, Archbishop Hieronymus allocated significant funds for charitable purposes in Warsaw. He donated 40,000 rubles for the construction of an orphanage for children from mixed-faith families, who, according to Russian law, could not remain under the care of the non-Orthodox parent after the death of the Orthodox one. He also supported the school and the Church of St. Leontius in Siedlce, a girls' school in Chełm, a parish school he founded in Warsaw, and orphanages at the monasteries in Wirów, Leśna Podlaska, and Teolin. Additionally, he established a similar institution at the monastery in Radecznica. In 1900, he expanded the Warsaw orphanage for children from military families.

In 1905, after the division of the Eparchy Chełm and Warsaw into two jurisdictions with seats in Chełm and Warsaw, Archbishop Hieronymus was appointed head of the latter, holding the title of Archbishop of Warsaw and the Vistula.

Since 1902, from the founding of the organization, he had supported the activities of the Galician-Russian Charitable Society, which aimed to strengthen the pro-Russian "russophile" movement in Galicia.

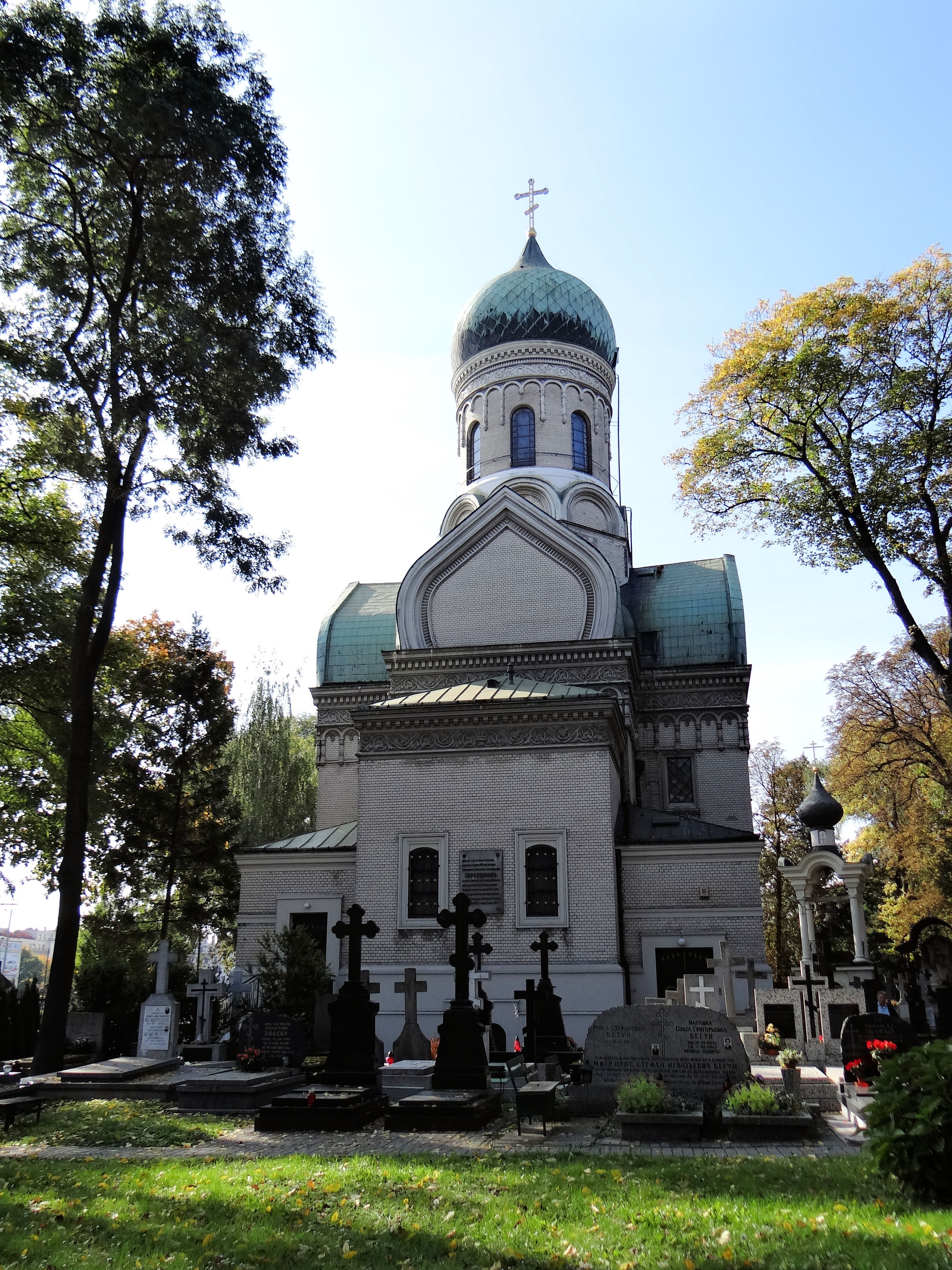
St. John Climacus's Orthodox Church built by Archbishop Hieronymus in Warsaw

In 1905, Archbishop Hieronymus also personally funded the construction of the St. John Climacus's Orthodox Church at the Orthodox Cemetery in Warsaw. The building was intended to serve as his family's mausoleum. The archbishop arranged for the remains of his son, Ivan, who had died three years earlier, to be brought to the church, and he chose it as his own burial site as well. The church was consecrated in October 1905. Two weeks after the ceremony, Archbishop Hieronymus died and was buried in the place he had designated for himself.

At the direction of the Most Holy Synod, his funeral was led by Archbishop Nikander of Vilnius and Lithuania, accompanied by Bishop Eulogius of Chełm, Archimandrite Dionysius, rector of the theological seminary in Chełm, as well as clergy from the Warsaw and Vistula eparchies.

He was decorated with the Order of Saint Vladimir, 3rd and 2nd Class, the Order of Saint Anna, 1st Class, and the Order of Saint Alexander Nevsky. He also received a personalized panagia from the Tsar on two occasions.

== Bibliography ==
- Shcheglov, V. (1906). Vysokopreosvyashchennyy arkhiyepiskop Ieronim Ekzemplarskiy (1836–1905) Высокопреосвященнейший архиепископ Иероним Экземпларский (1836–1905) [His Eminence Archbishop Hieronymus Ekzemplarski (1836–1905)] (in Russian). Kiev: Tipografiya tov. I. N. Kushniyev i K.
- Szabaciuk, A. (2013). "Rosyjski Ulster". Kwestia chełmska w polityce imperialnej Rosji w latach 1863–1915 ["Russian Ulster": The Chełm Question in the Imperial Politics of Russia from 1863 to 1915] (in Polish). Lublin: Wydawnictwo Katolickiego Uniwersytetu Lubelskiego. ISBN 978-83-7702-819-3.
