= St. John Climacus's Orthodox Church, Warsaw =

St. John Climacus's Orthodox Church
- St. John Climacus's Orthodox Church in Warsaw
- Cerkiew św. Jana Klimaka
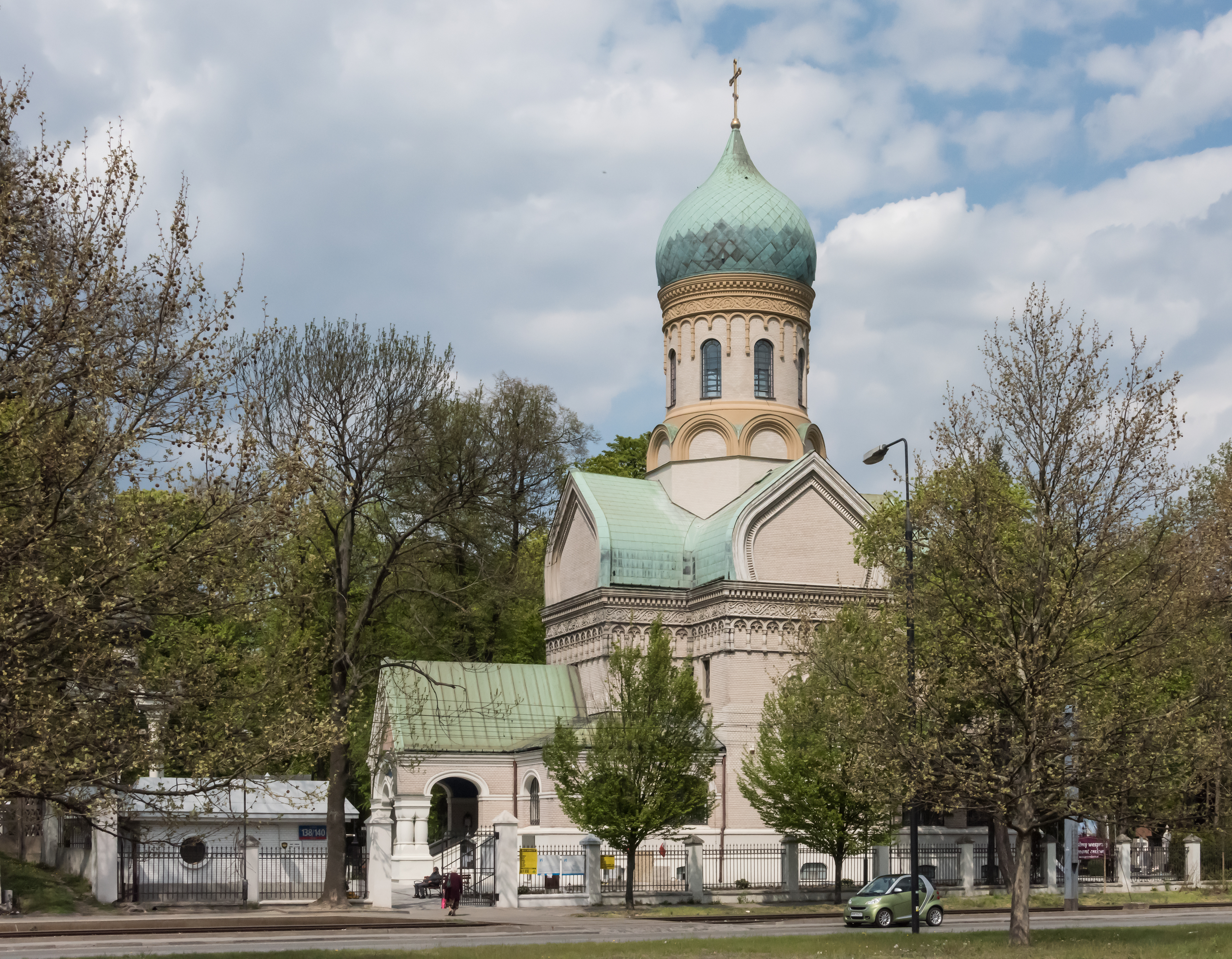
- View of the church from Wolska Street
- St. John Climacus's Orthodox Church
- 52°13′40.62″N 20°56′47.40″E
- Location: Warsaw
- Country: Poland
- Denomination: Polish Orthodox Church
- Website: http://www.prawoslawie.pl

History
- Founded: 1903
- Consecrated: 15 October 1905

Architecture
- Architect: Vladimir Pokrovsky
- Style: Russian Revival
- Groundbreaking: 1903
- Completed: June 1905

Specifications
- Materials: stone, brick

Administration
- Diocese: Warsaw-Bielsko
- Deanery: Warsaw

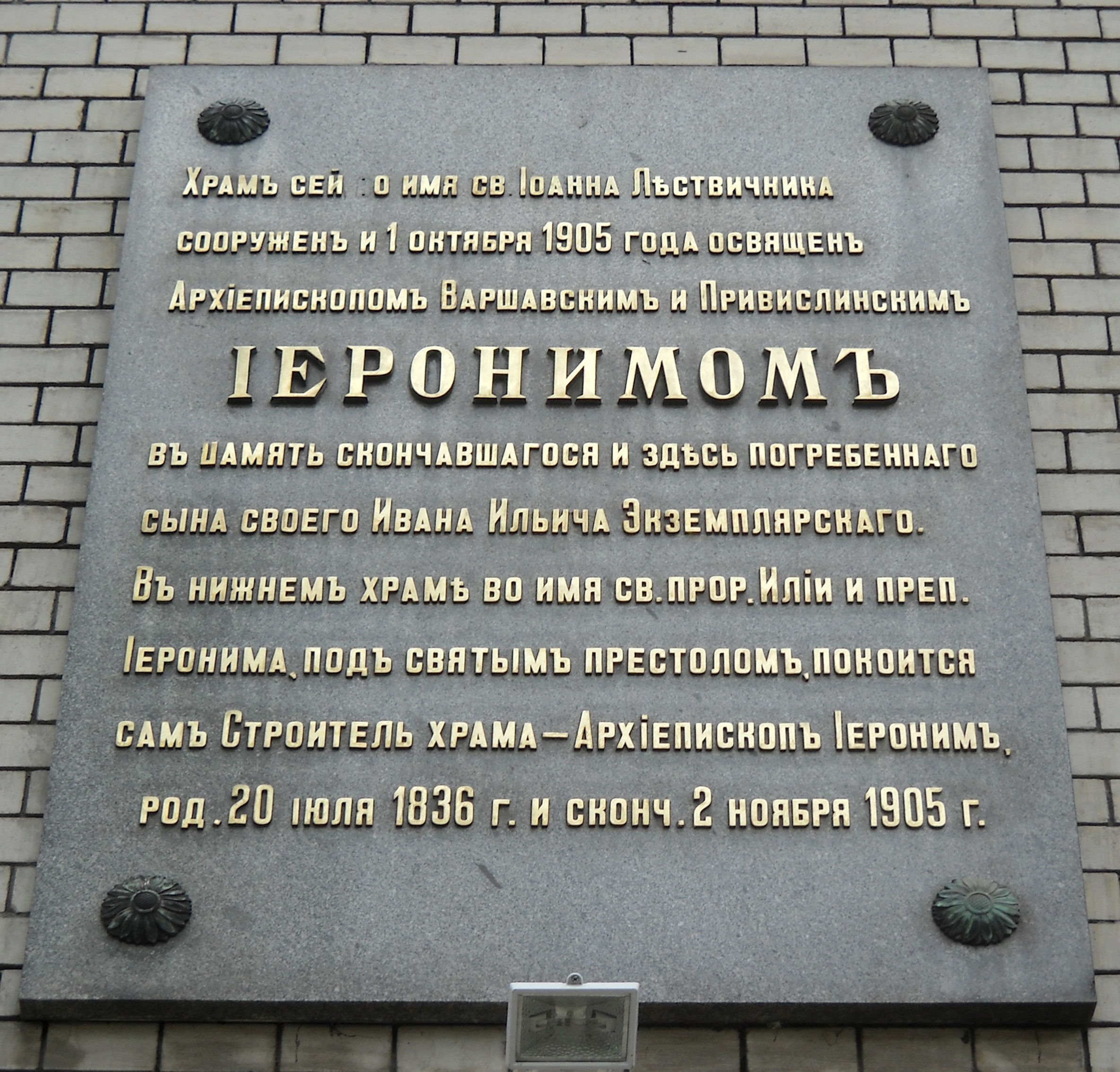
The plaque commemorating the founding of the church on the east side of the building

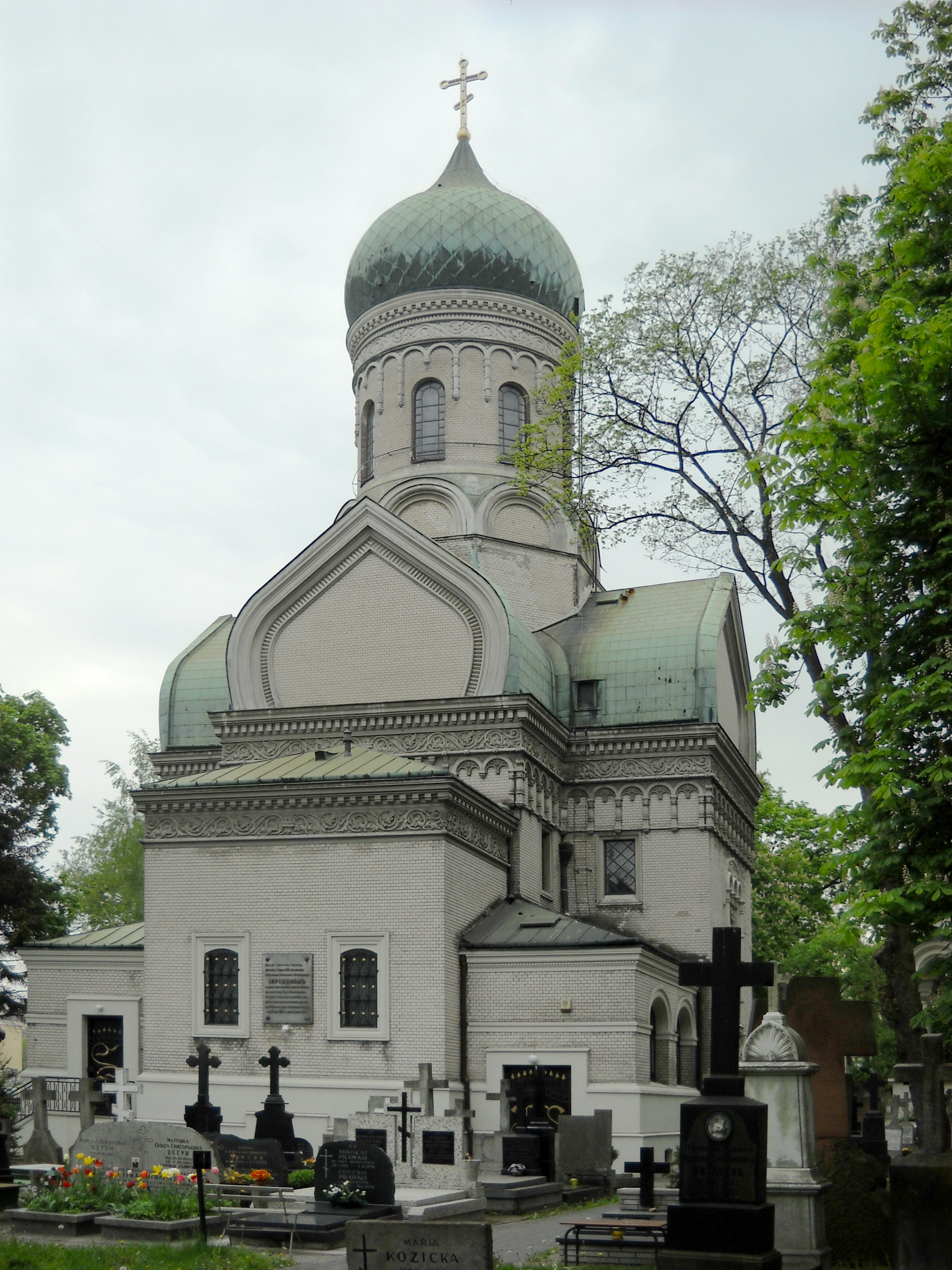
View of the church from the east side, showing the area intended for burials of Orthodox clergy. The plaque commemorating the founding of the building is visible

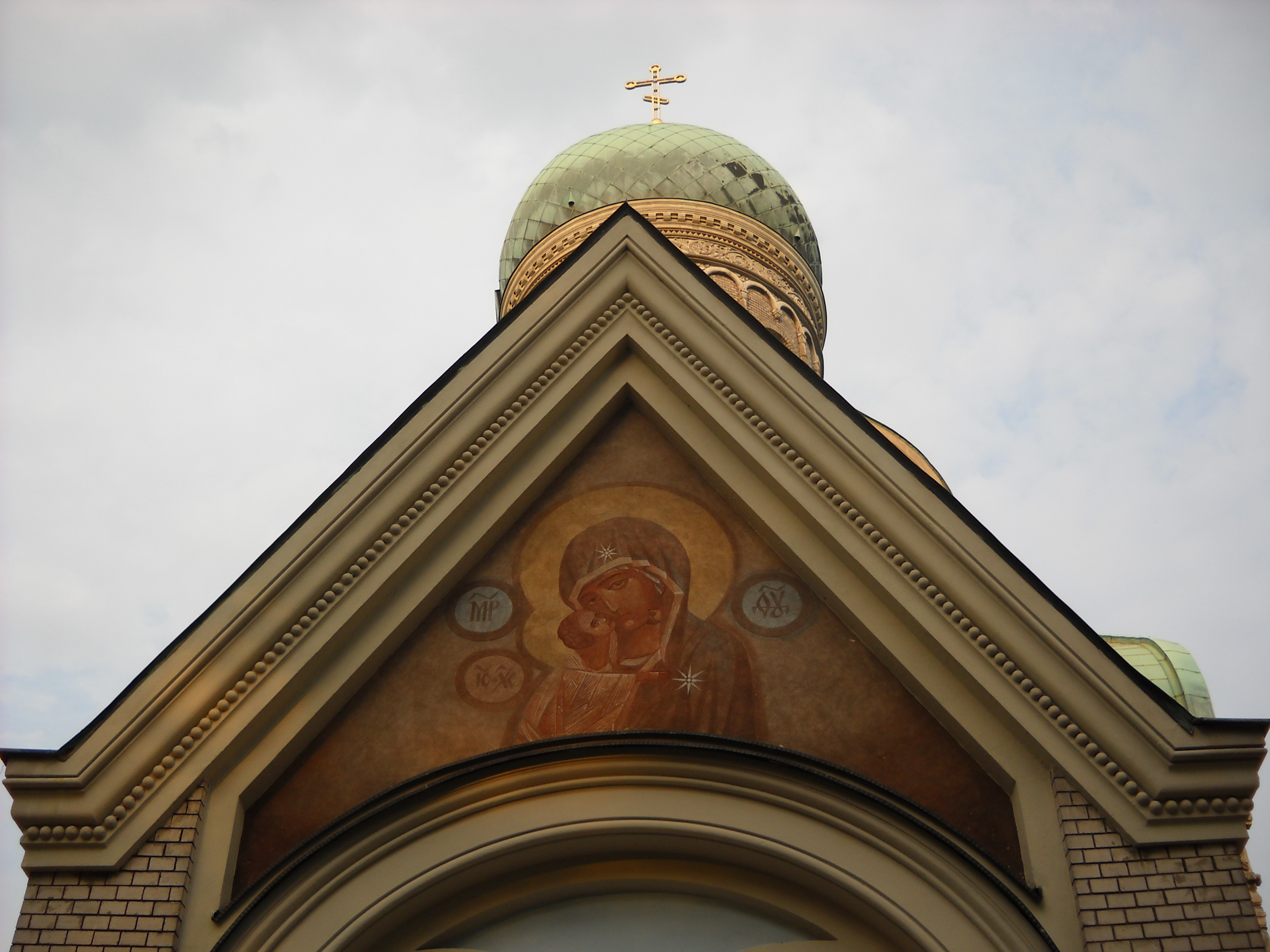
A fresco with the figure of Our Lady above the entrance to the temple

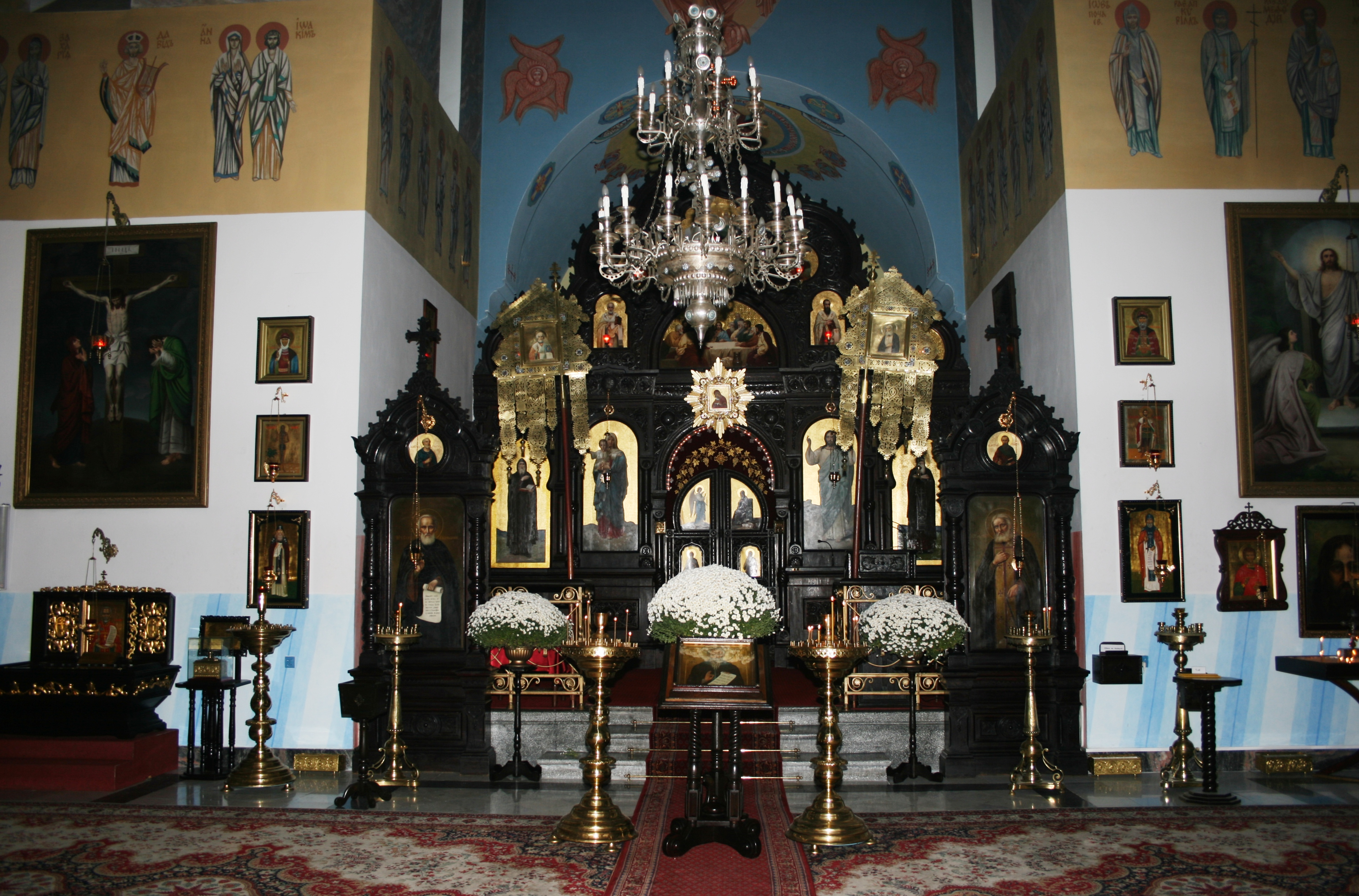
The iconostasis

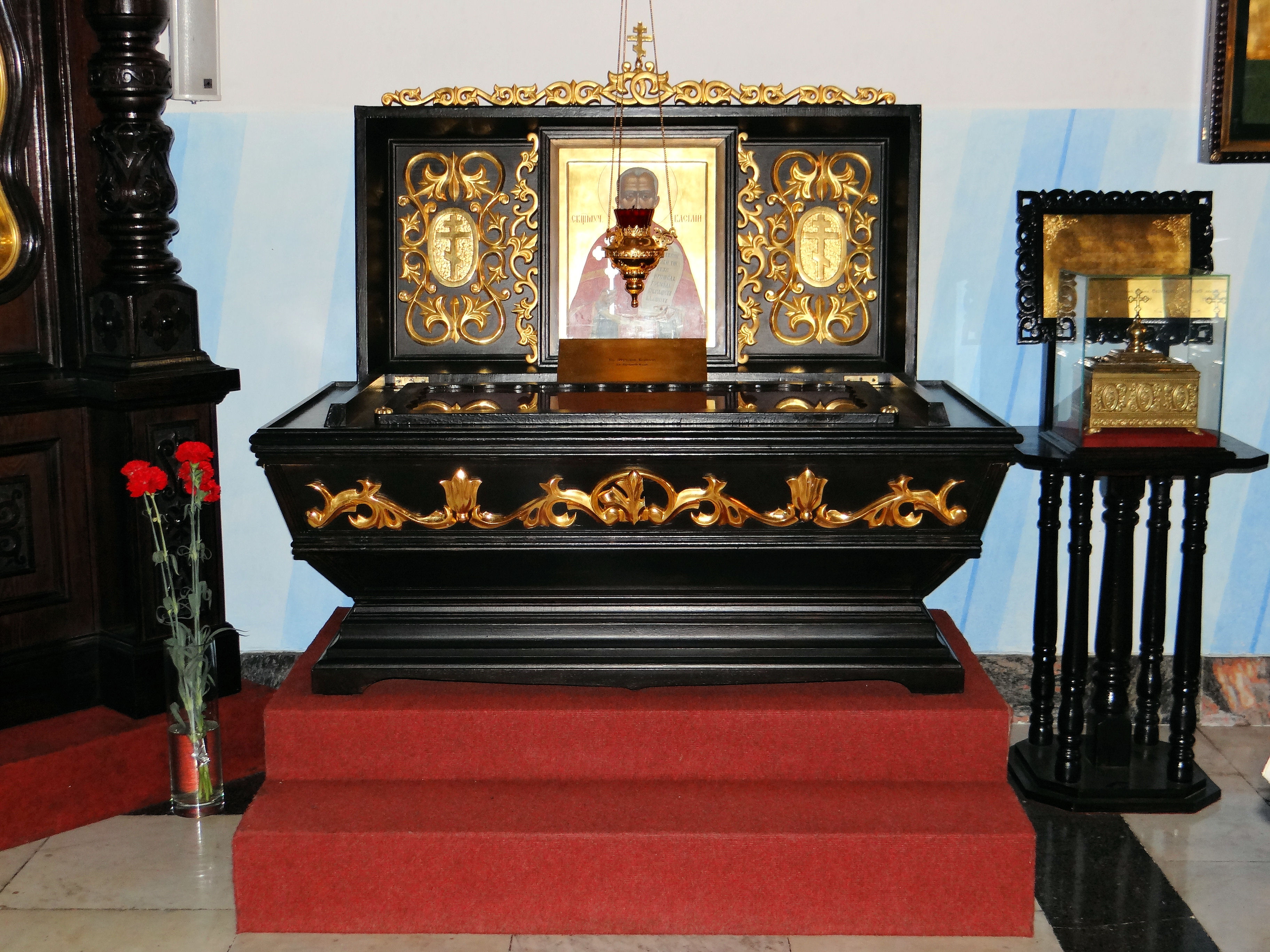
The relics of Bazyli Martysz

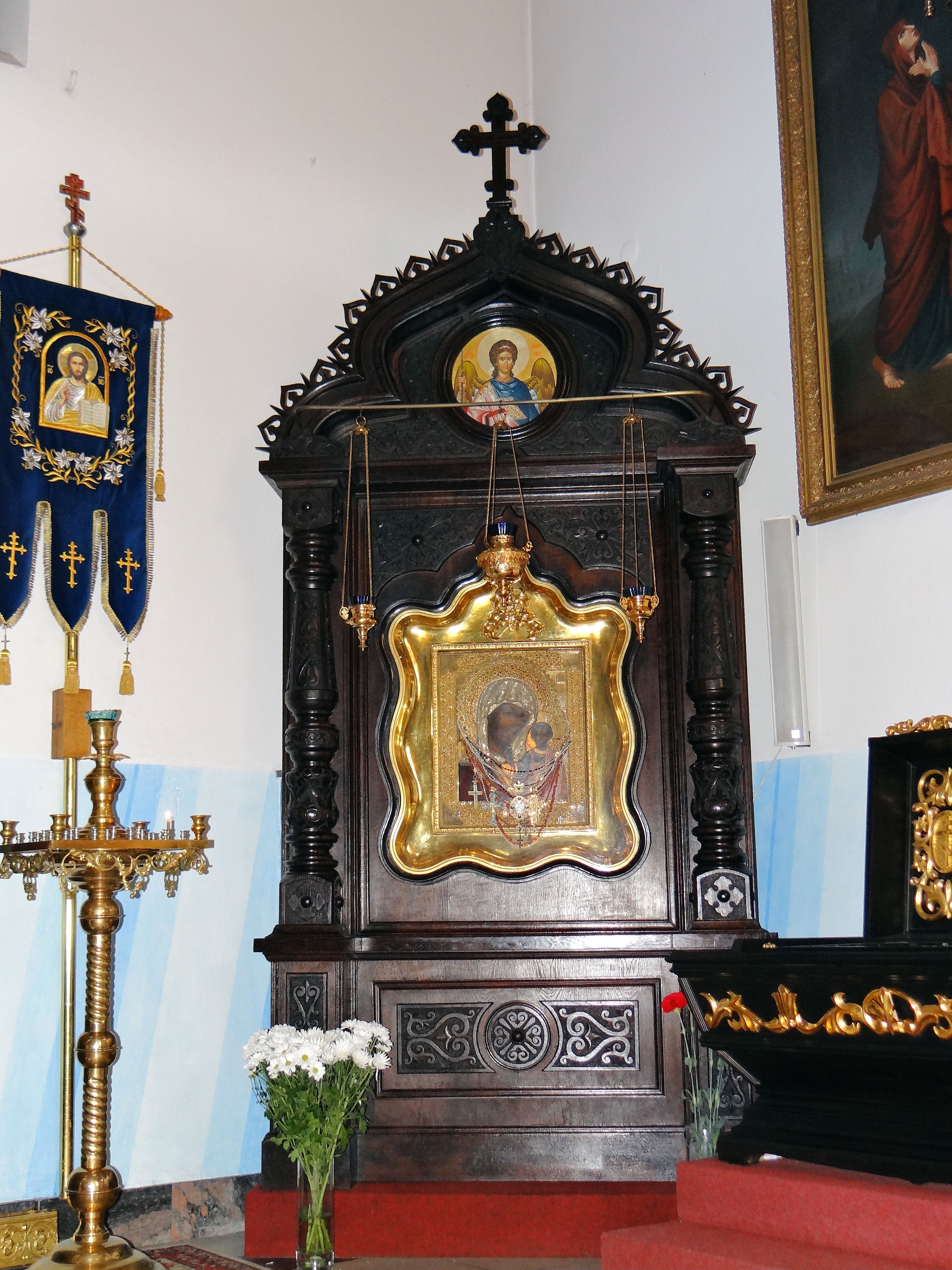
A copy of the Our Lady of Kazan icon

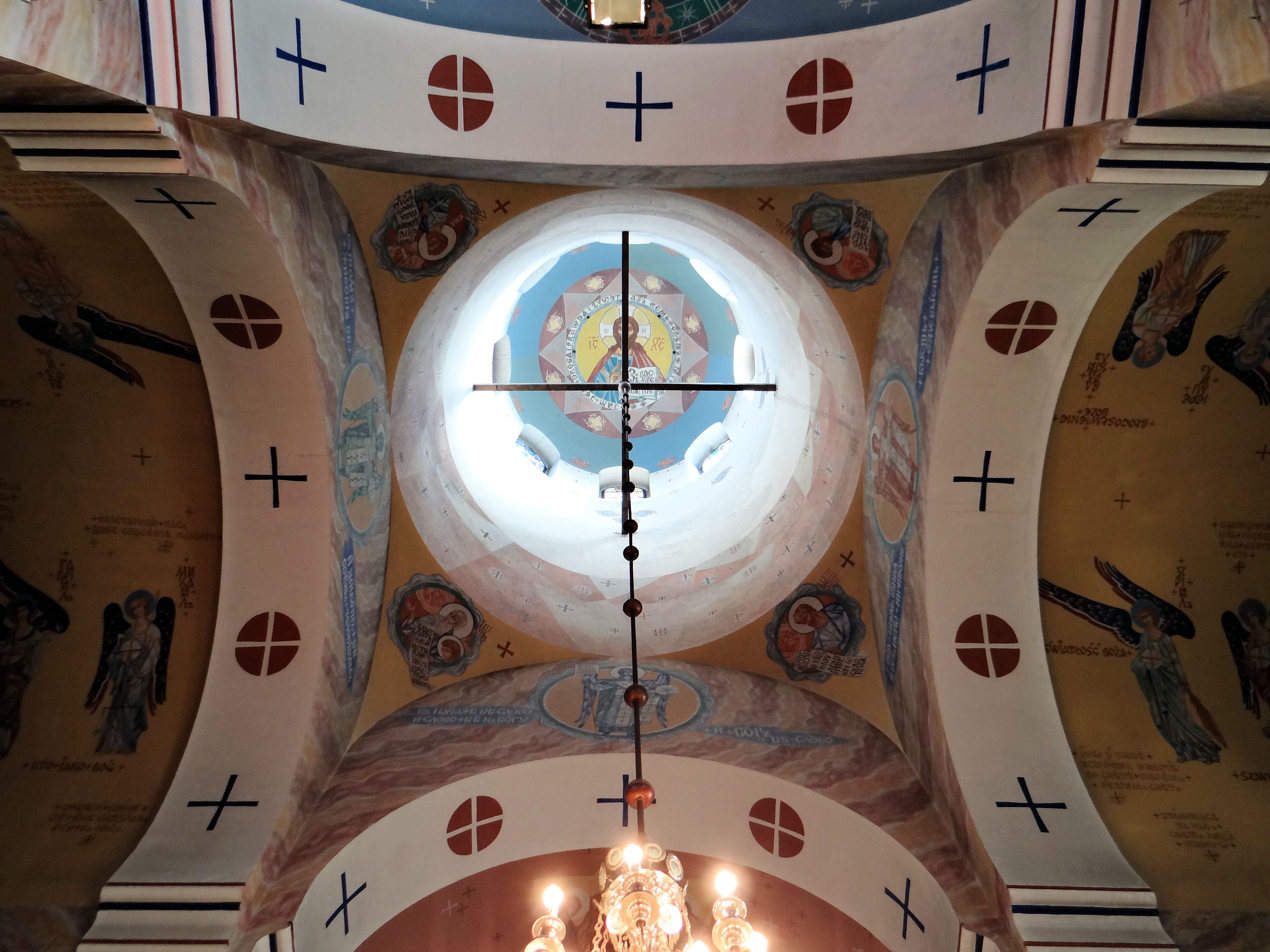
Paintings by Adam Stalony-Dobrzański on the main dome

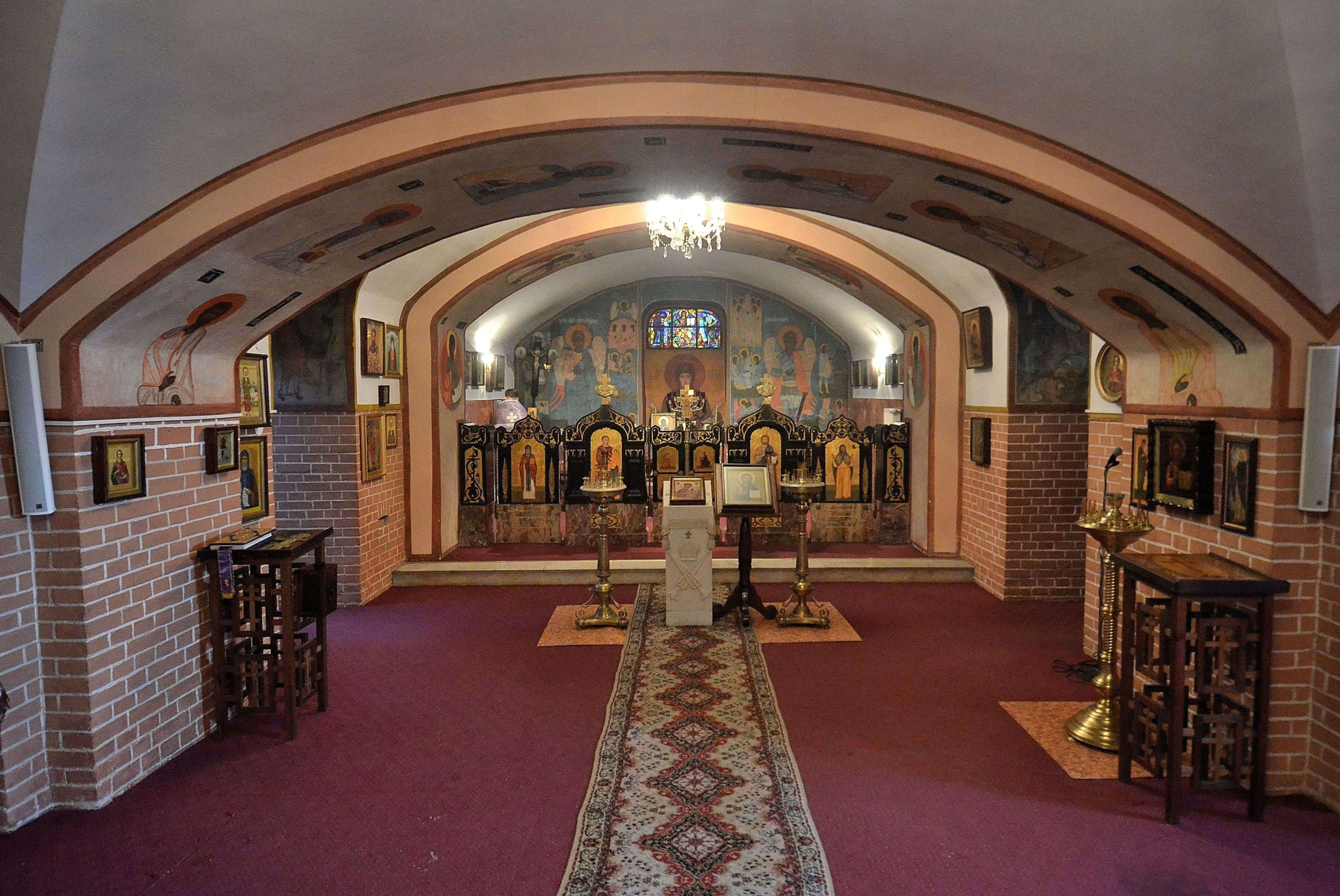
The interior beneath the church of St Elijah and St. Jerome. Visible is the white marble Analogion and the tomb of the Metropolitan of Warsaw Jerzy Jaroszewski

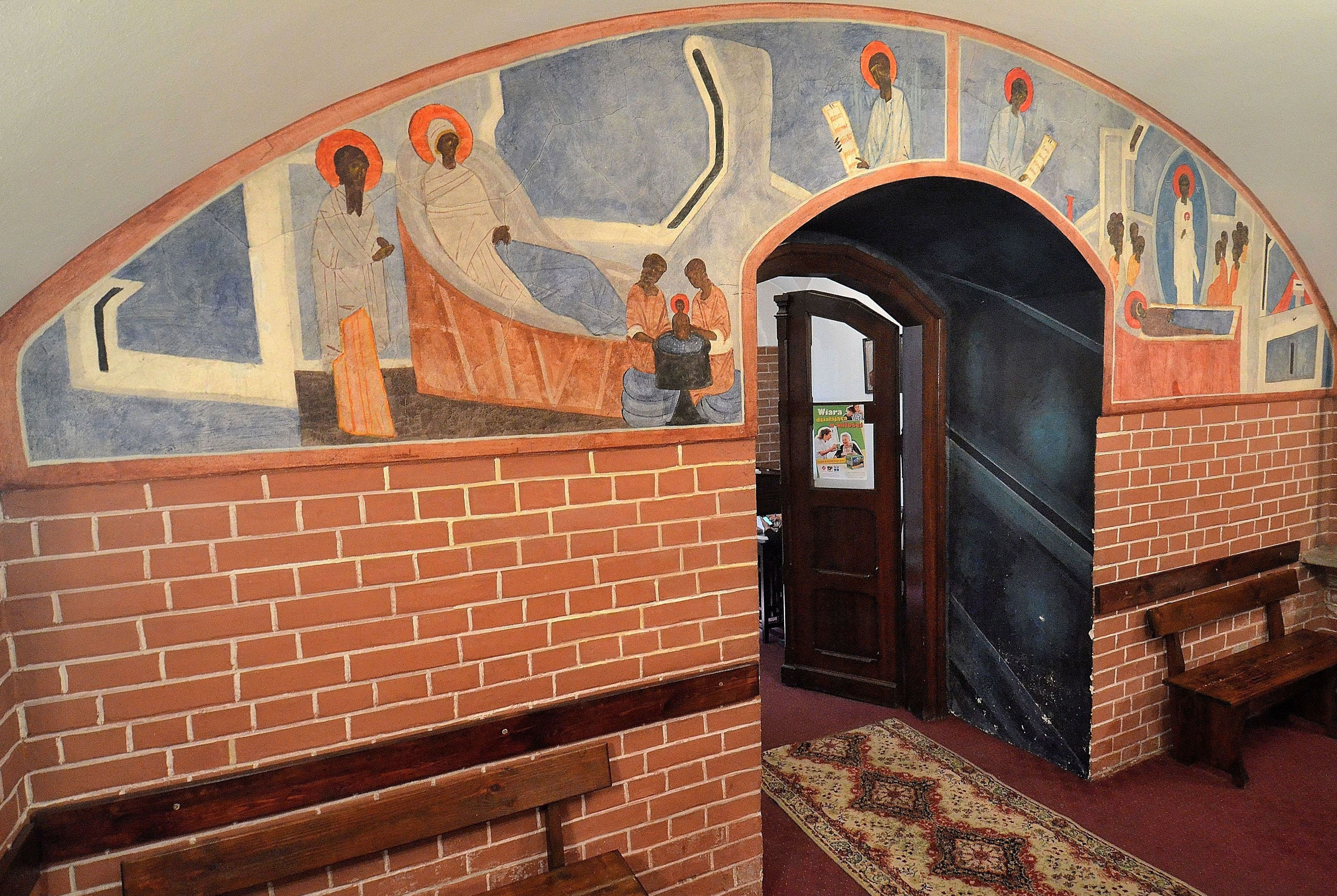
One of the frescoes by Jerzy Nowosielski under the church

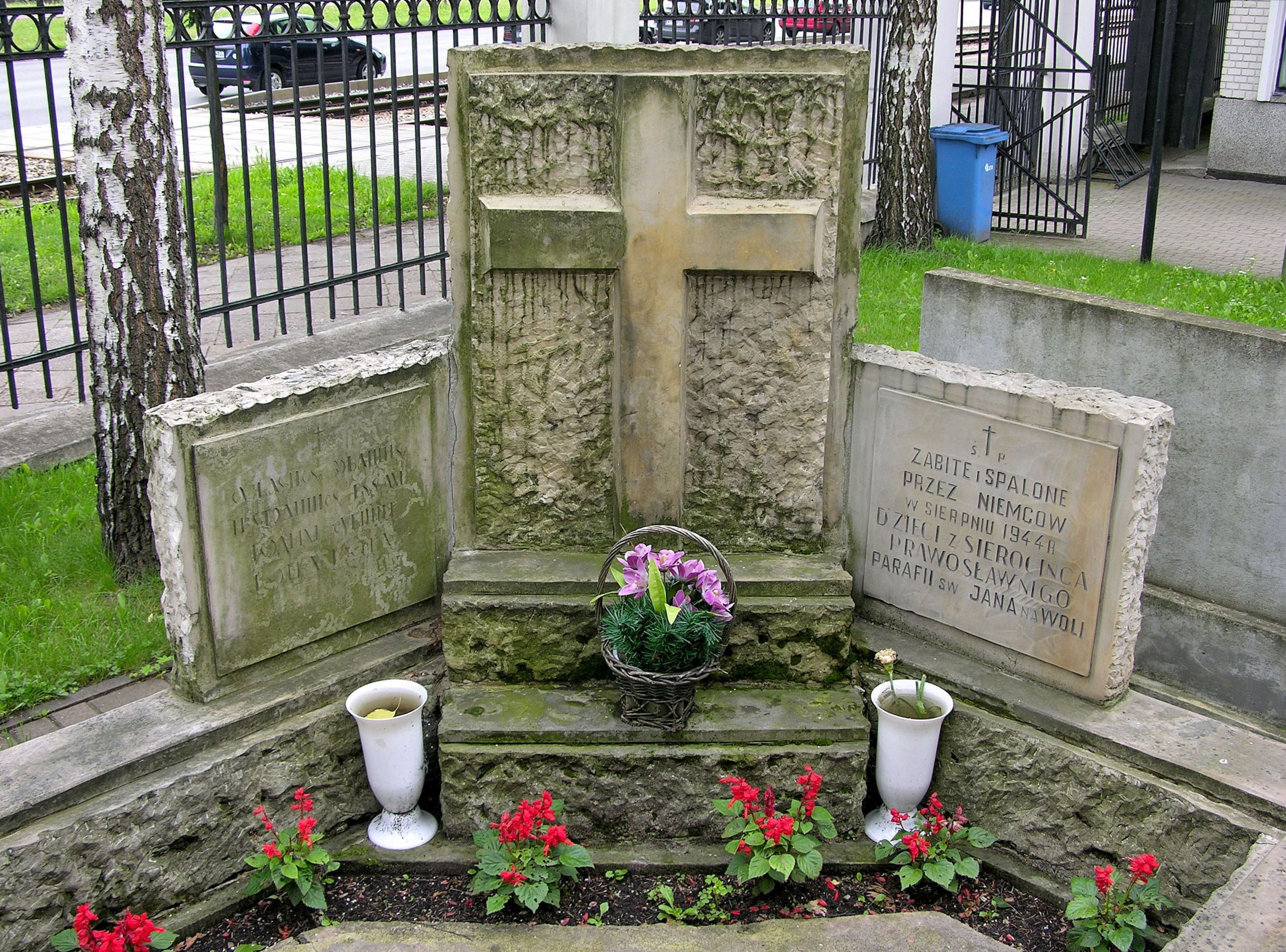
Mass grave of children and their carers from the parish orphanage, murdered by Germans during the Wola massacre in August 1944

The St. John Climacus's Orthodox Church (Polish: Cerkiew św. Jana Klimaka, Russian: Церковь Святого Иоанна Лествичника, romanized: Tserkov Svyatogo Ioanna Lestvichnika) in Warsaw is an Orthodox parish church belonging to the Warsaw deanery of the diocese of the Polish Orthodox Church. It is located at 140 Wolska Street in the Ulrychów area of the Wola district, inside the Orthodox cemetery.

The church was built from 1903 to 1905 at the initiative of the Archbishop of Warsaw, Hieronymus Ekziemplarski, as a burial place for his son Ivan and for future church hierarchs. It also served as a cemetery church for funerals and services for the dead. During the interwar period, the Orthodox parish was associated with Russian rule, a period in which many Orthodox churches in Poland were demolished or closed. Except for the period from 1915 to 1919, the church continued services almost uninterrupted. The building was damaged during World War II, and during the Wola massacre German forces murdered its priests, their families, and children from the Orthodox orphanage run by the parish.

The building was designed by Vladimir Pokrovsky and imitates the appearance of 17th-century church buildings in Rostov. The church contains historic icons and objects from the early 20th century, including an iconostasis made by Alexandr Murashko. Murals added in the 1960s and 1970s were created by Adam Stalony-Dobrzański and Jerzy Nowosielski. The building was renovated from 1945 to 1948, and again in the 1960s and 1970s.

Since 2003, the relics of St. Bazyli Martysz have been available for veneration in the church. The church, together with the whole area of the Wola Redoubt, was entered in the register of monuments on August 20, 2003 (No. A-54).

== History ==
=== Construction ===
St. John Climacus's Orthodox Church was founded through the private initiative of Hieronymus, the Archbishop of Warsaw, within the cemetery in Wola. It was built as an auxiliary church to St. Lawrence's Church, which had been confiscated from Catholics after the November Uprising. Its immediate purpose was to commemorate the archbishop's deceased son, Ivan Ilyich Ekzemplarskii.

In 1903, the archbishop acquired a plot of land with an area of 1,237 square fathoms, approximately 4,137 m^{2} (44,530 sq ft), situated by the eastern cemetery wall on Wolska Street. The plot cost 4,275 rubles. On June 28, 1903, the foundation stone was laid. The church was designed by architect Vladimir Pokrovsky, and the building and its surrounding iron fence were entirely financed by the Archbishop of Warsaw. Construction was completed in June 1905, but the consecration, also conducted by the archbishop, was delayed until 15 October 1905. Two weeks later, the archbishop died and, in accordance with his wishes, was buried next to his son. The ceremony, which took place in the unfinished church, was led by the Archbishop of Vilnius and Lithuania, Nikander, and the Bishop of Chełm, Eulogius. Orthodox Christians, Catholics, and Jews attended the funeral.

=== 1915–1939 ===
In 1915, all Orthodox priests working in Warsaw were evacuated, and the church was closed. It was looked after by Nikanor Skibin.

In 1919, Father Antoni Rudlewski came to Warsaw from Łódź to become pastor at the Church of the Holy Trinity in Podwale (Cerkiew Świętej Trójcy na Podwalu) and to regularly celebrate liturgy there. At his request, Father Jan Kowalenko also came to Warsaw and took care of the church in Wola. At Kowalenko's initiative, the bell tower was erected in 1931; its bells weigh 354 kg. Due to the return of some churches to Catholic ownership and the demolition of others after the Russians left, the church in Wola became, along with the St. Mary Magdalene Cathedral in Praga, one of two free-standing Orthodox churches remaining in Warsaw.

In 1923, the murdered Metropolitan of Warsaw, Jerzy Jaroszewski, was buried in the church.

=== World War II ===
The church, especially its lower part, was often used as a refuge for civilians during the defence of Warsaw in September 1939. The church also served as a hiding place for civilians during the Warsaw Uprising.

On 5 August 1944, during the Wola massacre, the pastor, Archimandrite Teofan (Protasiewicz), and one of his priests, Father Antoni Kaliszewicz, were killed there, along with Kaliszewicz's family. German troops also murdered the children of the Orthodox orphanage run by the parish, its employees, and dozens of people from the nearby neighbourhood who were hiding in the lower part of the church, and burned their bodies. A mass grave of children and staff of the orphanage is located at the church on Wolska Street.

German soldiers repeatedly committed acts of vandalism, including stealing the church's bells. After these events, the church was abandoned and remained unattended until January 1945.

=== Under communism ===
Continuing the efforts of his predecessor, Father Aleksander Czubuk-Podolski became the new pastor of the parish in Wola at the end of 1945 and served until 1948. At the beginning of the next decade, the technical condition of the church building was described as good, although it needed restoration.

In the 1950s, two Tchorek plaques commemorating the victims of the Wola massacre were placed in the cemetery and on Wolska Street.

In the 1960s, the church was completely renovated. In 1964, the facade and dome underwent renovation. In 1966, the interior of the building was rebuilt, including the choir, which received a painting depicting Christ's prayer in the wilderness. In the same decade, the parish of St. John Climacus organised Orthodox religious teaching for school-age children, with classes held in the church, as the pastoral facility did not have a parish house. In the early 1970s, around 30 children took part in these classes.

On the night of 22 May and on 23 May 1968, unknown perpetrators broke into the building and stole a number of historic icons and Orthodox items.

In 1977, the lower church was renovated. In December 1978, the building was re-dedicated after extensive renovations. The ceremony was presided over by the Metropolitan of Warsaw and Poland basilica, accompanied by Archimandrite Atanazy (Kudiuk), the superior of the monastery in Zhyrovichy (Russian Orthodox Church), and a group of their priests. Repair works continued after the re-dedication of the building. In 1980, frescoes in the upper part of the church were completed after seven years of work, while in 1987 the older belfry was replaced with a structure designed by Michał Sandowicz. The following year, the church held celebrations marking the millennium of the baptism of Rus'. In addition to Orthodox clergy, representatives of other Christian churches also attended. A plaque inside the church commemorates the event.

=== Post-1989 ===
In the 1990s further repairs were carried out, including the restoration of frescoes in the upper church. On 5 December 1999, after the completion of the work, the church was re-consecrated by the Metropolitan of Warsaw and head of the Polish church, Metropolitan Sawa (Hrycuniak).

In 2009, a plaque in honour of Orthodox believers who died during World War II was unveiled on the western side of the building.

In 2014, the lower part of the church was renovated again, with the flooring replaced and the ceiling painted. Efforts are underway to restore Jerzy Nowosielski's frescoes, which are in poor condition because of mould and damp.

== Architecture ==
In designing the Orthodox church, Vladimir Pokrovsky drew on 17th-century religious architecture from the Rostov region. The expressive Russian style was intended to contrast with the appearance of St. Lawrence's Church, which, according to the designer of the new church, retained clear external features of Catholic religious art.

The building was constructed on a Latin cross plan using stone and brick. It is topped with a single copper onion dome with a cross. On the eastern wall there is a plaque with an inscription in Russian commemorating the founder and describing the circumstances of the church's construction. The entrance to the church on the western side leads through an extended porch, an element also found in the architecture of Rostov. Above it is a triangular tympanum with a fresco depicting the Mother of God. The exterior is decorated with details typical of Rostov architecture, including motifs found in the churches of the Rostov Kremlin. The portals, nave, and aisle contain decorative acroteria, resembling the church's onion dome. A frieze of semicircular acroteria is located on the drum, below the row of windows.

The church has two floors, each adapted for worship.

=== The upper section ===
The patron of the church is John Climacus. According to the original design, the church was intended to be extremely modest in comparison with other Orthodox churches built by Russians in Warsaw, as it was completely devoid of wall frescoes. This was because the building was located in the cemetery. The walls are currently decorated with paintings by Adam Stalony-Dobrzański and Sotiris Pantopulos. Adam Stalony-Dobrzański also made the stained-glass windows of the church.

The iconostasis is the work of Alexandr Murashko, who had previously decorated, among others, the Church of the Archangel Michael in Warsaw. His Orthodox icons show a clear influence from the work of Viktor Vasnetsov, particularly the images of saints in St Volodymyr's Cathedral in Kyiv. The iconostasis is carved from oak. It has three rows and is decorated with small columns in the style of the Romanesque Revival, as well as with rosettes and acroteria. In the first row of icons, the deacons' doors contain a scene of the Annunciation and four images of the Evangelists. Traditionally, the left side contained an icon of the church's patron, while both sides of the royal doors contained images of Jesus Christ and the Virgin Mary. On the right side is an icon of St. Jerome. Above the royal doors is a much smaller rectangular icon of Christ of the Acheiropoieta type. The second row of icons presents St. Alexandra, St. Basil the Great, the Last Supper, St. John Chrysostom and St. Nicholas. The highest section is composed of round icons of St. Peter, St. Paul and a centrally located Trinity.

Since 1986, the royal doors have held a copy of the Pochayiv of Our Lady icon, made in Warsaw and dedicated at the Pochayiv Lavra. After the return of St. Lawrence's Church to the Catholic Church, three further icons that had originally been in that church were returned.

On the altar there is an icon of the Resurrection and a series of icons representing selected great feasts of the Orthodox Church. On both sides of the aisle are icons of the saints Sergius of Radonezh and Seraphim of Sarov. On the right side of the iconostasis are a Golgotha and an icon of Christ the Suffering, by Proto-deacon Semenov. Other saints whose images are venerated in the church include St. Andrew the Apostle, St. Olga of Kiev, and St. Vladimir the Great, whose icons were inserted for the millennium of the Baptism of Kievan Rus'. Other icons were brought from pilgrimages to Athos, including copies of the icon of Our Lady and St. John Ruthenian. In the atrium is a reproduction of the Sermon of Christ in the Boat. The church's furnishings are continually enriched and renewed.

Specially venerated icons include an icon of St. Nicholas and a copy of the Our Lady of Kazan, placed in 2001 in a decorated icon case made by Wojciech Szmeja. These images were placed in the church at the initiative of the founder. Since 2003, the church has also held relics of Bazyli Martysz, one of the martyrs of Chełm and Podlasie.

=== The lower section ===
The lower section of the church is dedicated to St. Elijah and St. Jerome, patron saints of the church's founder. The decoration of the lower part of the building was led by Pyotr Fedders. It contains a single-row iconostasis made by Vladimir Inokentiev from pink and black marble, imported specially from Sweden. The altar is made of the same material, and Archbishop Hieronymus is buried beneath it. The walls of the church were covered with paintings by A. Korelin, who also made the glass icon of Christ Pantocrator surrounded by the Apostles. Between 1977 and 1979, the existing wall decoration was replaced by frescoes by Jerzy Nowosielski. They depict selected scenes from the history of salvation, while the east wall contains an image of Our Lady of Orans. The central marble analogion in the lower church is also the tomb of the Metropolitan of Warsaw, Jerzy.

In his will, the archbishop requested that the appearance of the lower part of the church not be changed and that it not be used for subsequent funerals. Land adjacent to the church on the east side was to be allocated for the burial of other people. This request was not fulfilled, as others were later buried in the church with him. In 1944, there was also a project to widen the lower chapel so that it could accommodate further burials. This plan was eventually carried out in 1978.

== People associated with the church ==
Protopriest Nikolai Lopatinskii, who served in the church from 1905 to 1906, was awarded a gold cross.

In the second half of the 20th century, parish pastors included Jerzy Klinger and Aleksy Znosko, who were theologians and professors of the Christian Theological Academy (Chrześcijańska Akademia Teologiczna) in Warsaw.

From 2003 to 2007, Paisjusz (Martyniuk) was the parish priest. He later became the bishop of the Diocese of Przemyśl–Nowy Sącz.

=== Guests of the church ===
The church has been visited by various hierarchs of the Orthodox Church during official visits to the Polish Orthodox Church. Visitors have included the Patriarchs of Constantinople Demetrios and Bartholomew, the Patriarch of Jerusalem Theophilos III, the Romanian Patriarch Teoctist, the Serbian Patriarch Pavle, the Archbishop of Athens Christodoulos, the Albanian Metropolitan Anastasios, the Metropolitan of the Czech Lands and Slovakia Christopher, the metropolitans from America and Canada Theodosius and Herman, Archbishops Paul and Leo from Kuopio in Finland, the Metropolitan of Leningrad Alexy, the Metropolitan of Minsk and Slutsk Philaret, the Metropolitan of Astana and Kazakhstan Aleksander (Mogilow), the Metropolitan of Montenegro and the Littoral Amfilohije, and other Orthodox bishops from Belarus, Bulgaria, Cyprus, Georgia, Greece, Italy, Portugal, Romania, Serbia, and Ukraine.

== Bibliography ==
- Dariusz Anchimiuk. "Historia parafii św. Jana Klimaka". cerkiew.pl (in Polish).
- Adam Misijuk, Parafia prawosławna św. Jana Klimaka w Warszawie na Woli, "Kalendarz Prawosławny 2005", Warszawska Metropolia Prawosławna, Warszawa 2004, ISSN 1425-2171
