= Witold Smętek =

Polish athlete (1910-1983)

Witold Stanisław Smętek
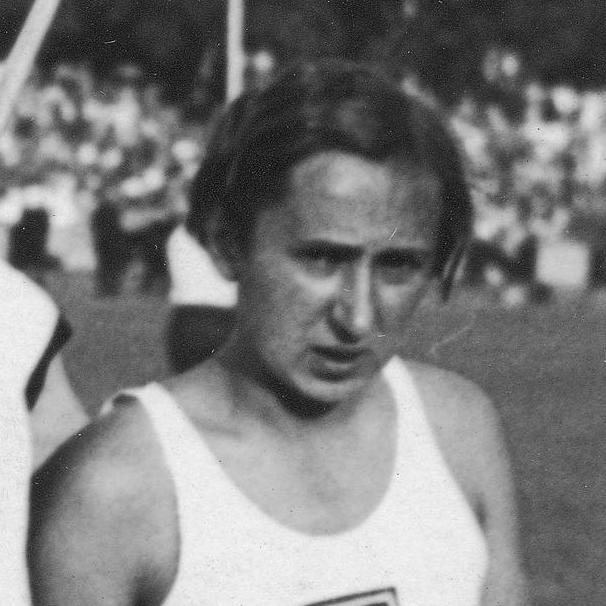
- Smętek in 1935, before transition
- Born: Zofia Smętek; 17 December 1910; Kalisz, Poland
- Died: 29 January 1983 (aged 72); Warsaw, Poland
- Occupation: Athlete

Witold Stanisław Smętek (17 December 1910 – 29 January 1983) was a Polish athlete, javelin thrower, runner, handball player, table tennis player, Polish champion and record holder. Born intersex and assigned female at birth, in 1937 Smętek transitioned to male.

== Life ==
=== Early life ===
Witold Smętek was born as Zofia Smętek on 17 December 1910 in Kalisz. Smętek was interested in sports as a child and, due to his skill, achieved good results, first in the track and field section of Kalisz Sports Club. In 1928, Smętek won the Wielkopolska tetrathlon and, after consulting with coaches, focused on javelin throw. In 1930, he won a cycling competition organized in Kalisz. In 1931, Smętek was approached by the managers of the ŁKS Łódź club, which had a strong track and field section. He was offered the opportunity to join the club and did so.

=== Athletic career ===
In 1932, Smętek won the gold medal at the Polish javelin championship. Thanks to this, he was called to the national team, with which he played four times: on 26 June 1932 in Lwów in the 63:43 match against Czechoslovakia (last, 4th place in the javelin throw with a result of 29.87 m), on 15 July 1934 in Warsaw in a lost (35:64) match with Germany (last, 4th place in the javelin throw with a result of 31.78 m), On 19 August 1934 in Poznań, in a 62:37 match against Japan (last, 4th place in shot put) and on 25 August 1935 in Dresden, in a lost (38.5:60.5) match with Germany (last, 4th place in the javelin throw with a result of 28.92 m).

As a club player, Smętek won the national championship in Czech handball in 1932, and was fourth in the Polish cross country running championship. In the following year he broke the Polish record in javelin throw three times, ultimately achieving a result of 38.23 m (his personal best of his entire career). On the same day Smętek improved the world record by two meters, throwing a total of 59.34 meters with his right and left hands, but the result was not recognized due to problems with the preparation of the appropriate protocol. Despite that lack of official recognition, Smętek became famous nationwide. He was fifth in the Polish championships, but in the years 1934–1936 he won three silver medals.

=== Gender controversy and transition ===
Due to his looks and silhouette, Smętek was mistaken for a boy ever since childhood. With time, suspicions, remarks and rumors about Smętek's gender grew, especially given the athlete's custom of changing alone in the locker room. Not only other athletes but also cabaret artists, press columnists and satirists became interested. In 1934, Smętek left ŁKS Łódź and moved to Kalisz, but a year later he moved to Warsaw, where he started training at the KS Warszawianka club and working at the PZL aircraft factory. However, Smętek was still the focus of the press. In 1935, he won the bronze medal in 4 × 200 meters relay at the national championship. In June 1936, he took second place in the Warsaw championship in the 800 metres, and, in 1937, he became the Polish table tennis champion.

In 1935, Smętek was suspected to be intersex, and year later the press wrote about his supposed plans to undergo transition, which was denied by the athlete. Jan Szeląg joked in the satirical Szpilki, that the Smętek-related articles were a ploy by Melchior Wańkowicz, supposedly promoting his new book Na tropach Smętka (Tracing Smętek).

In October 1936, Smętek went for a private examination at the VI Gynecological Ward of the Infant Jesus Hospital in Warsaw, during which his intersexuality was confirmed, and Smętek decided to undergo sex reassignment surgery. Smętek initially withheld this information from the media, but on 14 April 1937, he issued a press statement on the matter, announcing that he would undergo surgery the following week. The information caused a further surge in interest in him.

On 19 April, Smętek reported to the Infant Jesus Hospital, and the surgery was performed on 23 April. After the operation, Smętek gave an interview to several journalists and announced that he would be named Witold Stanisław, but some sources incorrectly mention the name Józef. In May, he underwent another surgery related to gender reassignment. In the same year was called to the medical commission of the Supplementary Command in Łódź, but he was not drafted into the army. On 21 September 1937, the District Court in Kalisz approved the change of his personal data from "Zofia Smętek" to "Witold Stanisław Smętek".

=== Further life ===
Smętek has become the focus of the press not only in Poland, but also abroad. In British press he was compared to other transitioning athletes of the time: Zdeněk Koubek and Mark Weston. He was no longer successful in sports and he no longer played in the Warszawianka team, although shortly before the operation he was promised a career in the football section of this club. In September 1937, Smętek started playing for the Okęcie Warsaw football team. In May 1939, he gave an interview to Reuters in which he mentioned a wish to detransition (which he didn't follow on) due to the hard experiences of the past two years. In the same year, a book describing his story was published in France – "Confession amoureuse de la femme qui devint homme" (Love Confession of a Woman who Became a Man).

On 9 September 1939, when the World War II hostilities were already underway in Warsaw, in the church in Saska Kępa Smętek married Janina Rusinowska, with whom he had three children. During the war, Smętek was active in the Polish resistance, for which he was arrested and held imprisoned for a short time in Pawiak (due to lack of evidence he was released by the Gestapo). At the end of July 1944, he left Warsaw to reunite with his wife, who stayed near Częstochowa, and the couple remained there until the end of World War II.

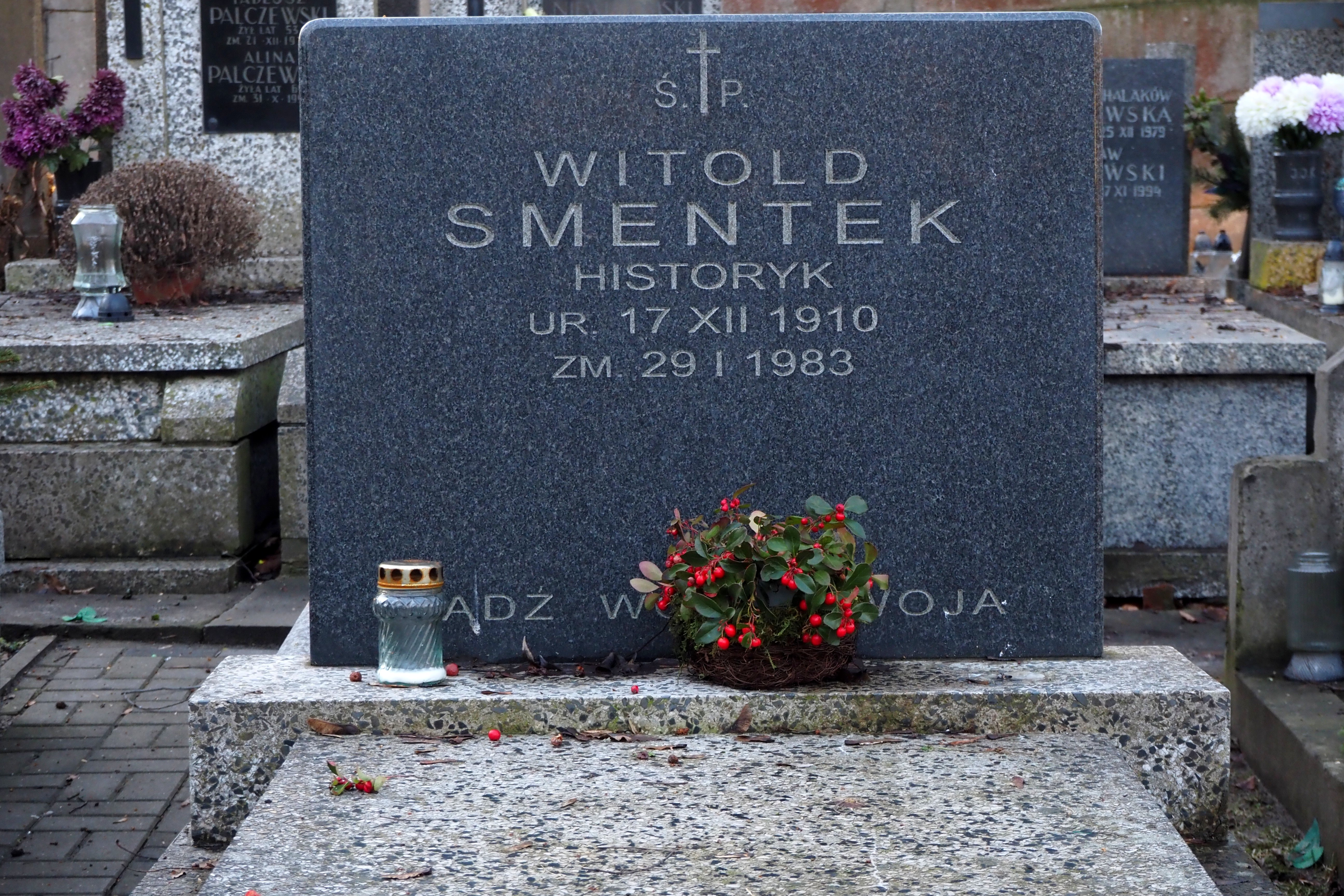
Smętek's grave at the Orthodox Cemetery

After World War II, Smętek was completely forgotten by the sports community; some sources even contained false information about his alleged death during the Invasion of Poland. In 1955, Smętek graduated in history from the University of Warsaw, with Żanna Kormanowa as the supervisor of his thesis. For many years he worked as a history and a homeroom teacher at the Primary School No. 75 in Warsaw. He was a Polish Tourist and Sightseeing Society guide who led Warsaw sightseeing tours. In 1973, after divorcing his first wife, he married a woman named Władysława. Smętek died on 29 January 1983 in Warsaw and was buried as Witold Smentek (post-war spelling) at the Orthodox Cemetery in Warsaw.
