= 2nd Guards Cavalry Division =

- 2-я Гвардейская кавалерийская дивизия
- Active: 1810–1918
- Country: Russian Empire
- Allegiance: Guards Corps
- Branch: Russian Imperial Army
- Type: Light cavalry
- Role: Maneuver warfare Raiding; Reconnaissance
- Size: Division
- Battle honours: Borodino; Fère-Champenoise; Great War

The 2nd Guards Cavalry Division was a Guards light cavalry division of the Imperial Russian Army.

== Organisation ==
1857–1918:

- 1st Cavalry Brigade
  - Horse Grenadier Life-Guards Regiment
  - Her Majesty's Lancer Guards Regiment
- 2nd Cavalry Brigade
  - Dragoon Guards Regiment
  - His Majesty's Hussar Guards Regiment)
- 2nd Division Life-Guards Horse Artillery

== Commanders ==
- 1882–1884: Aleksandr Puzyrevskii
- 1886–1890: Victor Fedorovitch Winberg
- 1901–1905: Georgi Skalon
- 1906–1909: Aleksei Brusilov
- 1912-1914: Georgy Ottonovich Rauch

== Commanders of the 1st Brigade ==
- 1913–1914: Sergei Belosselsky-Belozersky

== Commanders of the 2nd Brigade ==
- 1873–1874: Illarion Ivanovich Vorontsov-Dashkov
- 1896–1898: Sergei Vasilchikov

== Chiefs of Staff ==
- 1866–1875: Kazimir Vasilevich Levitsky
- 1902: Andrei Zayonchkovski
- 1909—1914 : Afrikan P. Bogaewsky
