= Orthodox Cemetery, Warsaw =

Orthodox Cemetery in Warsaw
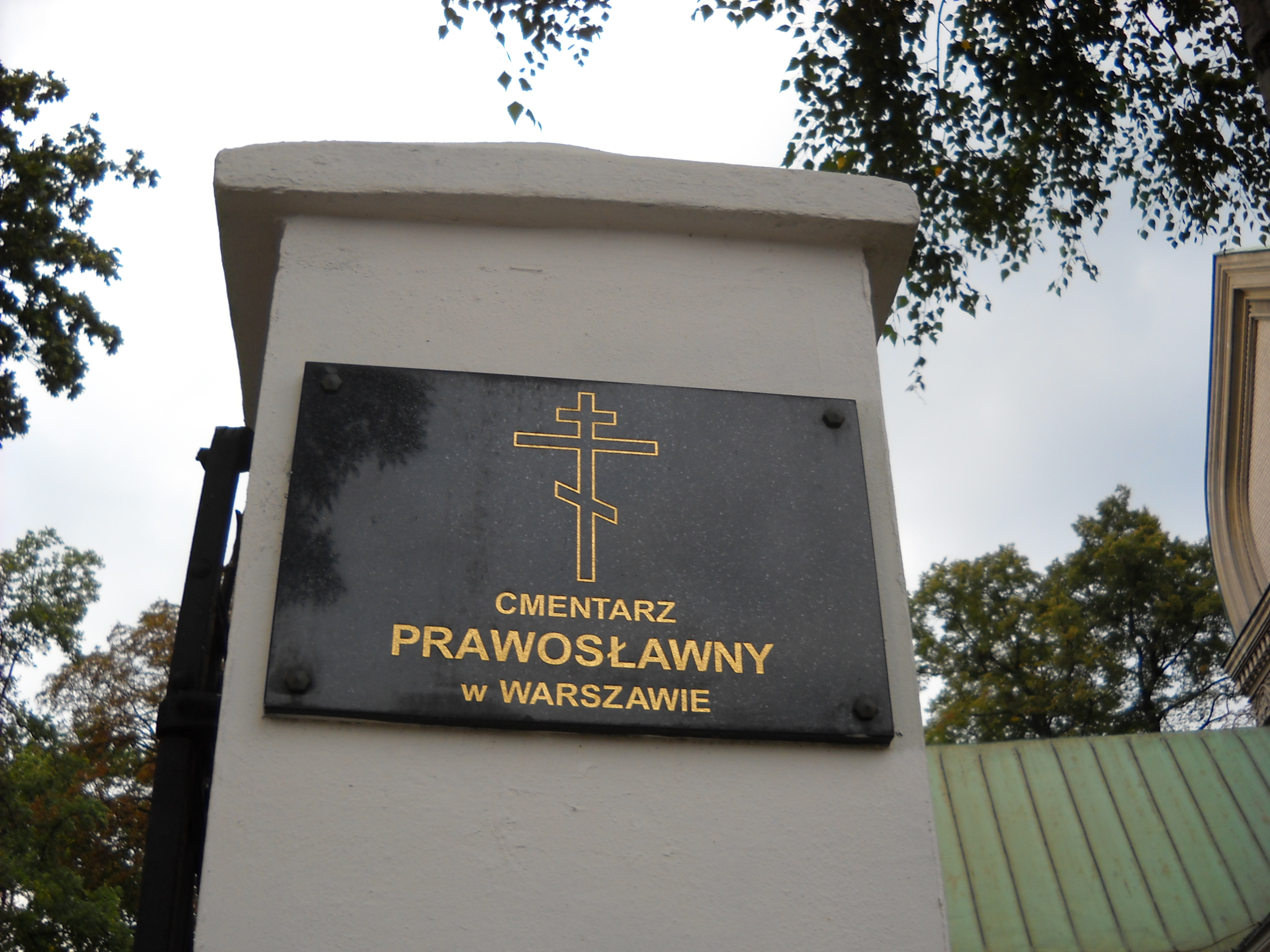
- Interactive map of Orthodox Cemetery in Warsaw

Details
- Established: 1841
- Location: Warsaw
- Country: Poland
- Coordinates: 52°13′48″N 20°56′40″E
- Type: Christian Orthodox cemetery
- Website: https://cmentarz.prawoslawie.pl/pl/
- Find a Grave: Orthodox Cemetery in Warsaw

The Orthodox Cemetery in Warsaw (Polish: Cmentarz Prawosławny w Warszawie) is an historic Eastern Orthodox cemetery located in the Wola district of Warsaw, Poland.

== History ==
In 1834 the first Orthodox parish was established in Warsaw and a decision was made to set up a cemetery for the community. The Roman Catholic parish of St. Lawrence was then turned into an Orthodox church, by decree of the Tsar himself. Although the cemetery was officially consecrated in 1841, the first burials took place there as early as 1836. In 1905 a new church, St. John the Ladder was built, while St. Lawrence Church returned to the Roman Catholic church after Poland regained its independence.

== Customs ==
The burial place of a person depended on his/her social status. Thus, generals, clergy and notable civil servants were buried near the church. The second 'zone' included the graves of lower rank officers, clerks and wealthy merchants. The third 'zone' housed the graves of soldiers and members of the bourgeoisie, while the poorest were buried in the area furthest from the church. During the Warsaw Uprising mass executions of Varsovians were carried out there.

On All Saints' Day, processions of the Orthodox and Roman Catholic churches take place there, preceded by an ecumenical service conducted by priests from both congregations.

== Notable burials ==
Among those buried at the cemetery are:

- Mikhail Artsybashev (1879–1927), Russian poet and writer
- Marko Bezruchko (1883–1944), Ukrainian military commander and a General of the Ukrainian National Republic
- Andrzej Butruk (1964–2011), Polish actor, satirician, singer
- Dmitry Filosofov (1872–1940), Russian author, essayist, literary critic
- Aleksander Gudzowaty (1938–2013), Polish economist and entrepreneur
- Czesław Kiszczak (1925–2015), Polish general, Interior Minister, Prime Minister
- Jerzy Klinger (1918–1975), Polish Orthodox theologian
- Siergiej Muchanow (1833–1897), Russian official, officer in the Special Corps of Gendarmes, director of the Warsaw Theatre Directorate
- Alexander Petrov (1794–1867), Russian chess player, chess composer, and chess writer
- Aleksandr Puzyrevskii (1845–1904), Russian General of the Infantry
- Witold Smętek (1910–1983), Polish athlete (spelled as Witold Smentek)
- Sokrates Starynkiewicz (1820–1892), Mayor of Warsaw
- Jerzy Turonek (1929–2019), Polish-Belarusian historian
- metropolitan Dionizy (Waledyński) (1876–1960)
- Timothy (Szretter), a Polish Orthodox clergyman, the third Metropolitan of Warsaw and all Poland (1901–1962)
- Andrzej Walicki (1930–2020), Polish historian

== Gallery ==
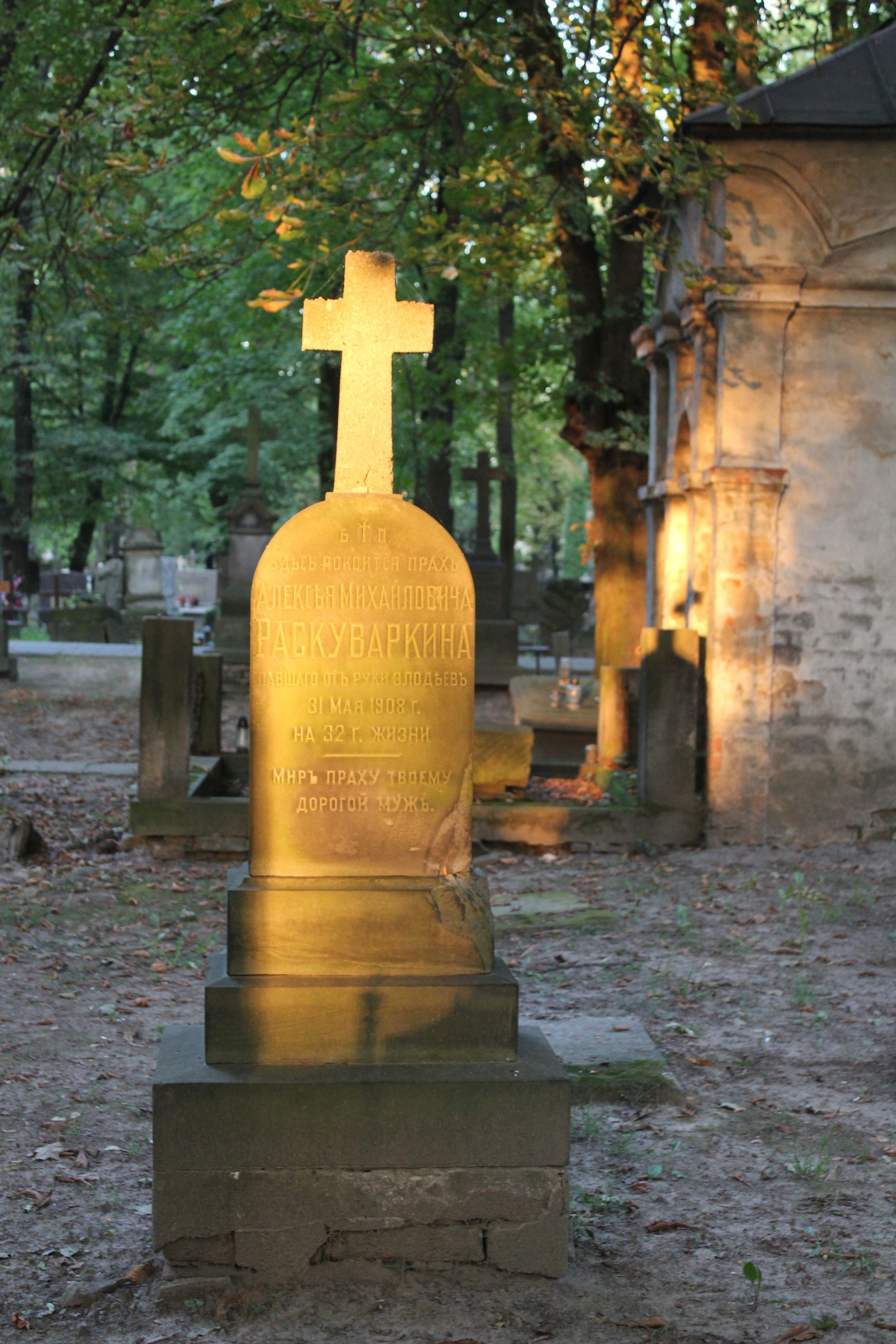
A Russian grave from 1908

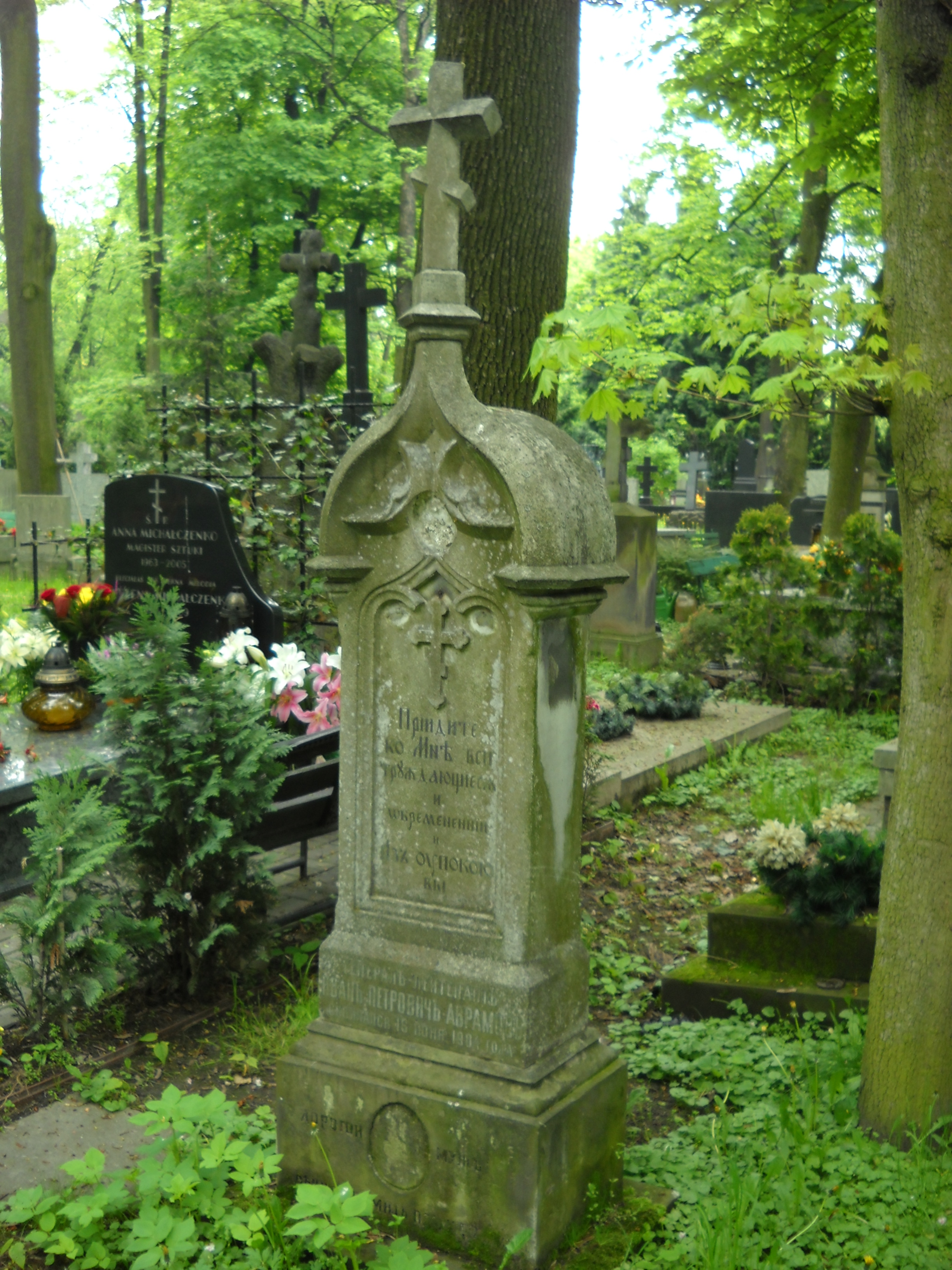

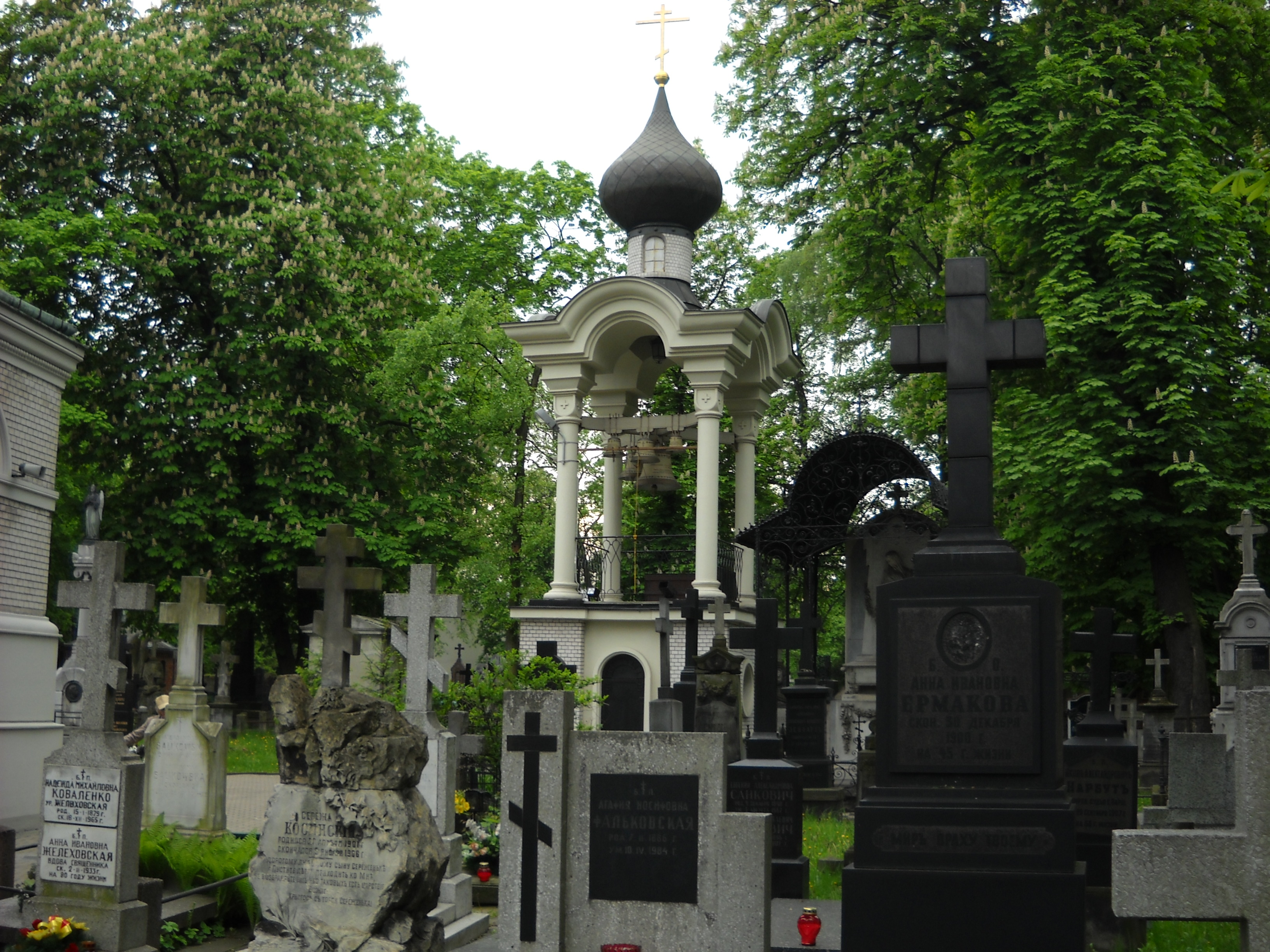
The belltower

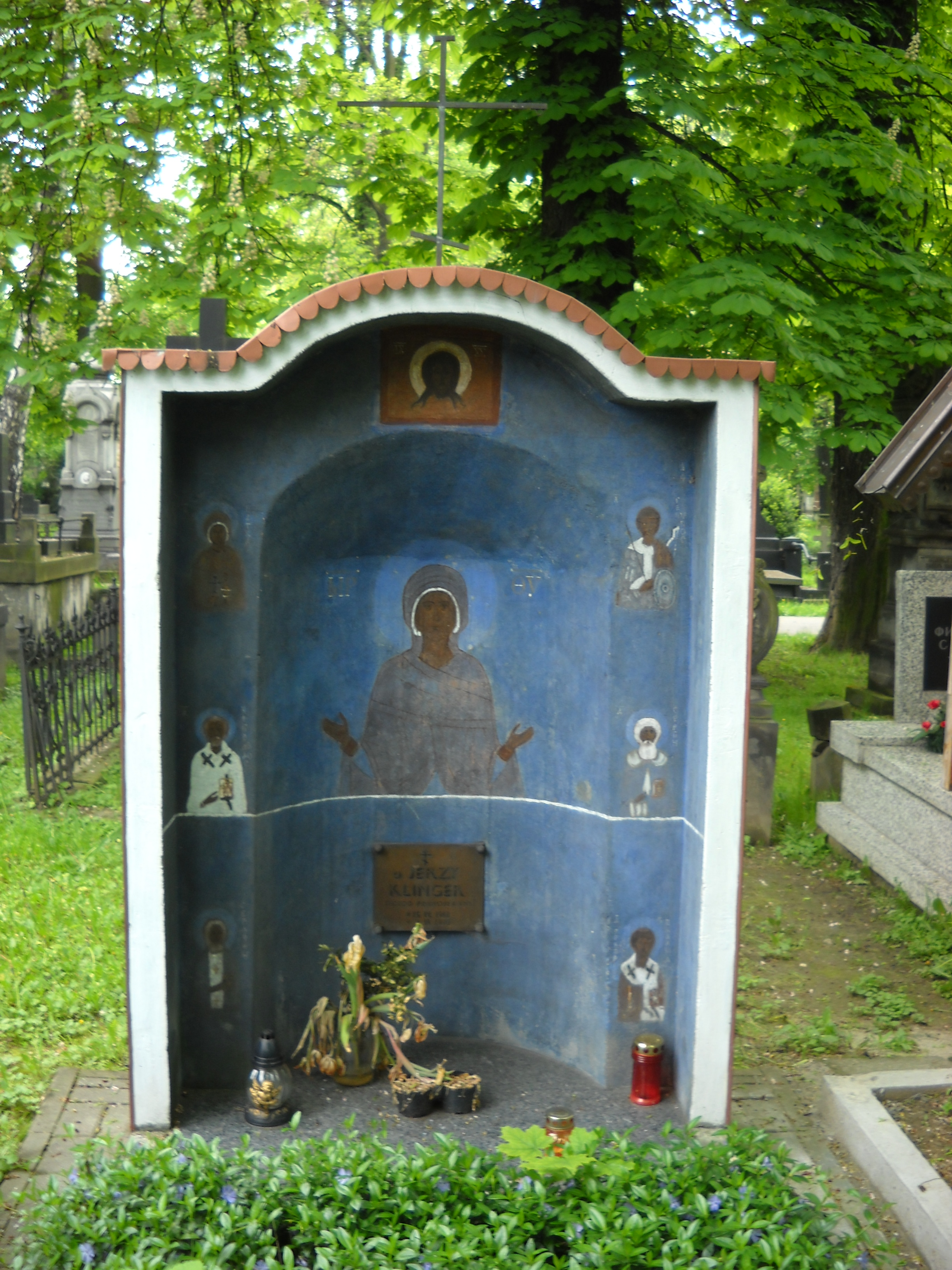
The grave of Jerzy Klinger painted by Jerzy Nowosielski
