= Dmitriyevy Gory =

Dmitriyevy Gory Дмитриевы Горы
- Selo
- Location within Vladimir Oblast Location within Russia
- Coordinates: 55°12′N 41°47′E
- Country: Russia
- Region: Vladimir Oblast
- District: Melenkovsky District
- Time zone: UTC+3:00

Dmitriyevy Gory (Russian: Дми́триевы Го́ры) is a rural locality (a selo) and the administrative center of Dmitriyevogorskoye Rural Settlement, Melenkovsky District, Vladimir Oblast, Russia. The population was 1,268 as of 2010. There are 9 streets.

== Geography ==
Dmitriyevy Gory is located on the Oka River, 24 km (15 mi) southeast of Melenki (the district's administrative centre) by road. Kononovo is the nearest rural locality.
