= Jerzy Klinger =

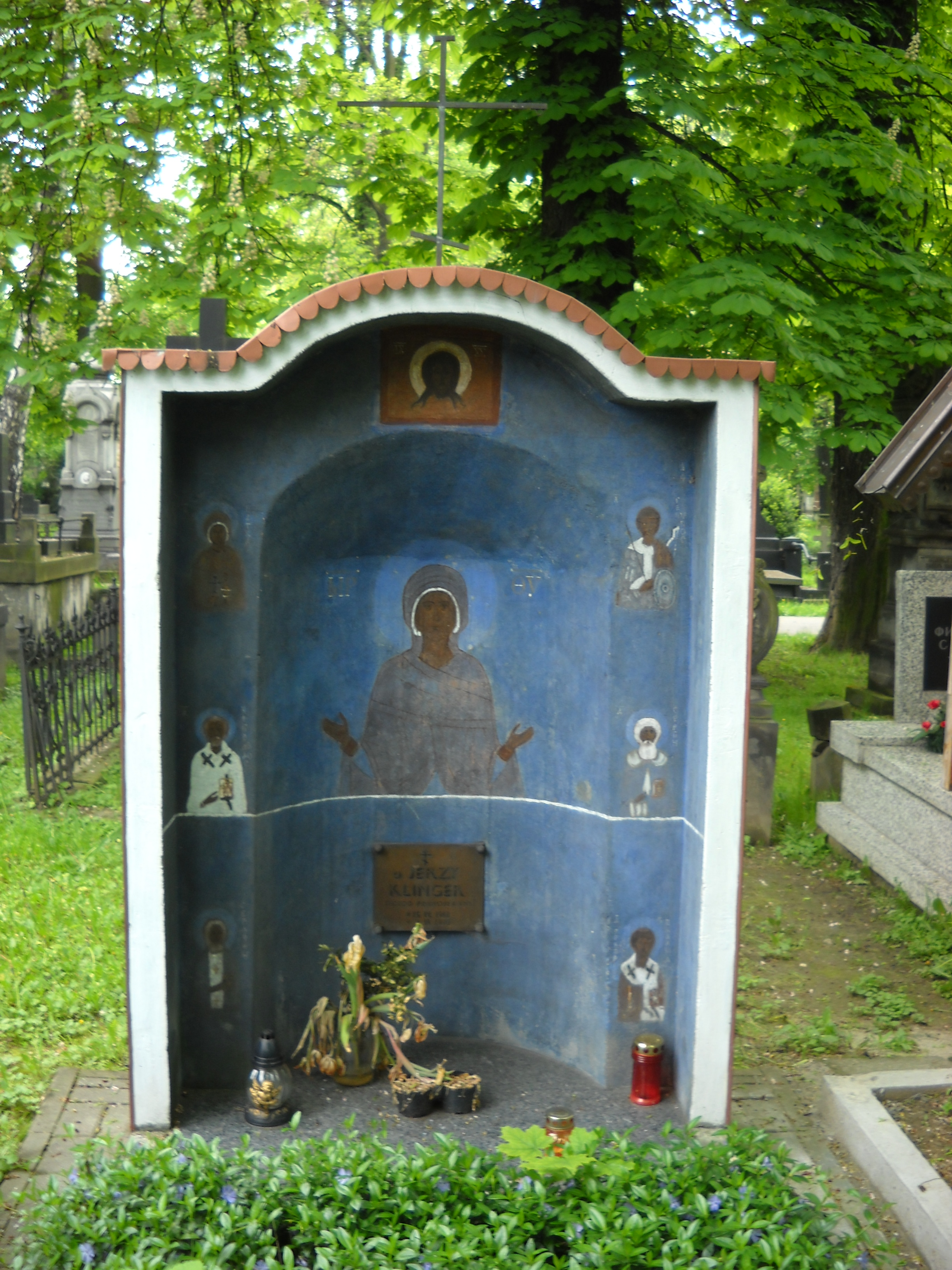
Klinger's grave at Orthodox Cemetery, Warsaw

Jerzy Klinger (April 15, 1918 – February 3, 1976) was a Polish Orthodox priest, theologian, professor and vice rector of the Christian Theological Academy in Warsaw.
