= Aleksandr Puzyrevskii =

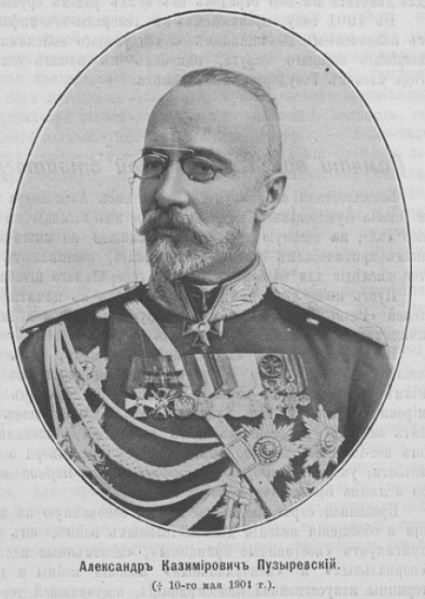
- Born: 3 October 1845; Bessarabia Governorate, Russian Empire
- Died: 10 May 1904 (aged 58) Warsaw, Russian Empire
- Allegiance: Russian Empire
- Service years: 1863–1904
- Rank: General of the Infantry
- Commands: Chief of Staff of the Warsaw Military District
- Conflicts: January Uprising; Russo-Turkish War; Siege of Plevna; Battle of Gorni Dubnik; Battle of Tashkessen; Battle of Philippopolis

Aleksandr Puzyrevskii (Russian: Александр Казимирович Пузыревский; 3 October 1845, in the Bessarabia Governorate – 10 May 1904, in Warsaw) was a Russian General of the Infantry. Puzyrevskii distinguished himself in the Russo-Turkish War (1877–1878), subsequently becoming a professor at the General Staff Academy and Chief of Staff of the Warsaw Military District. In parallel he wrote articles on military history and led efforts in the improvement of education among Russian military officers.

== Biography ==
Aleksandr Puzyrevskii was born on 3 October 1845, in the Bessarabia Governorate of the Russian Empire. His father Kazimir served as a colonel in the imperial military. On 12 June 1863, he graduated from the 1st Cadet Corps in the rank of praporshchik. He was then assigned to the 10th battery of the 5th Horse Artillery–Brigade, taking part in the suppression of the January Uprising in Poland. On 30 September 1870, he enrolled into the General Staff Academy, graduating in 1873. On 9 April, he was promoted to captain on account of his academic achievements and became a senior adjutant of the 1st Guards Infantry Division. He joined the Imperial General Staff on 25 October 1875.

During the course of the Russo-Turkish War (1877–1878), Puzyrevskii led the western flank of the units under the command of general Iosif Gurko. He took part in the Siege of Plevna, Battle of Gorni Dubnik, Battle of Tashkessen and the Battle of Philippopolis (1878). Through his service in the Balkan campaign he rose to the rank of colonel and received the Order of St. George 4th class, Order of Saint Stanislaus 2nd class with swords, Order of Saint Vladimir 4th class with swords.

After the end of the war he served as a special assignment officer in the staff of the Saint Petersburg Military District. On 29 October 1881, Puzyrevskii became an adjutant–professor of military arts at the General Staff Academy without having to submit a dissertation after receiving a recommendation from Mikhail Dragomirov. On 29 April 1882, became the commander of the 2nd Guards Cavalry Division. On 4 January 1884, Puzyrevskii was appointed to the position of assistant of the chancellor of the Imperial Ministry of Defence. On 18 October, Puzyrevskii was granted the title of professor, immediately abandoning his position at the Ministry of Defence. For a period of time he also tutored Alexander III of Russia in the subjects of military history and cavalry tactics.

In 1890, he left Saint Petersburg for Warsaw, after assuming the command of Chief of Staff of the Warsaw Military District. On 28 May 1894, Puzyrevskii was elected an honorary member of the General Staff Academy. In 1899, Puzyrevskii assisted in the launch of the Warsaw Military Journal, a journal containing articles on military history, book reviews on the same subject, as well as analyses of the organization and tactics of foreign armed forces. A number of his articles were translated into French and German and published abroad. Puzyrevskii also wrote a number of articles in the Encyclopedia of Military and Marine Sciences. In an effort to improve the education of Russian officers, he led discussion groups for military officers and created a list of works to be present in officer's libraries across the country which was later approved by the Ministry of Defence. In 1901, Puzyrevskii received the rank of General of the Infantry.

On 10 March 1904, Puzyrevskii became a member of the State Council. Puzyrevskii died on 10 May of the same year.
