= List of tallest buildings in Warsaw =

Skyline of Warsaw Panorama Warszawy
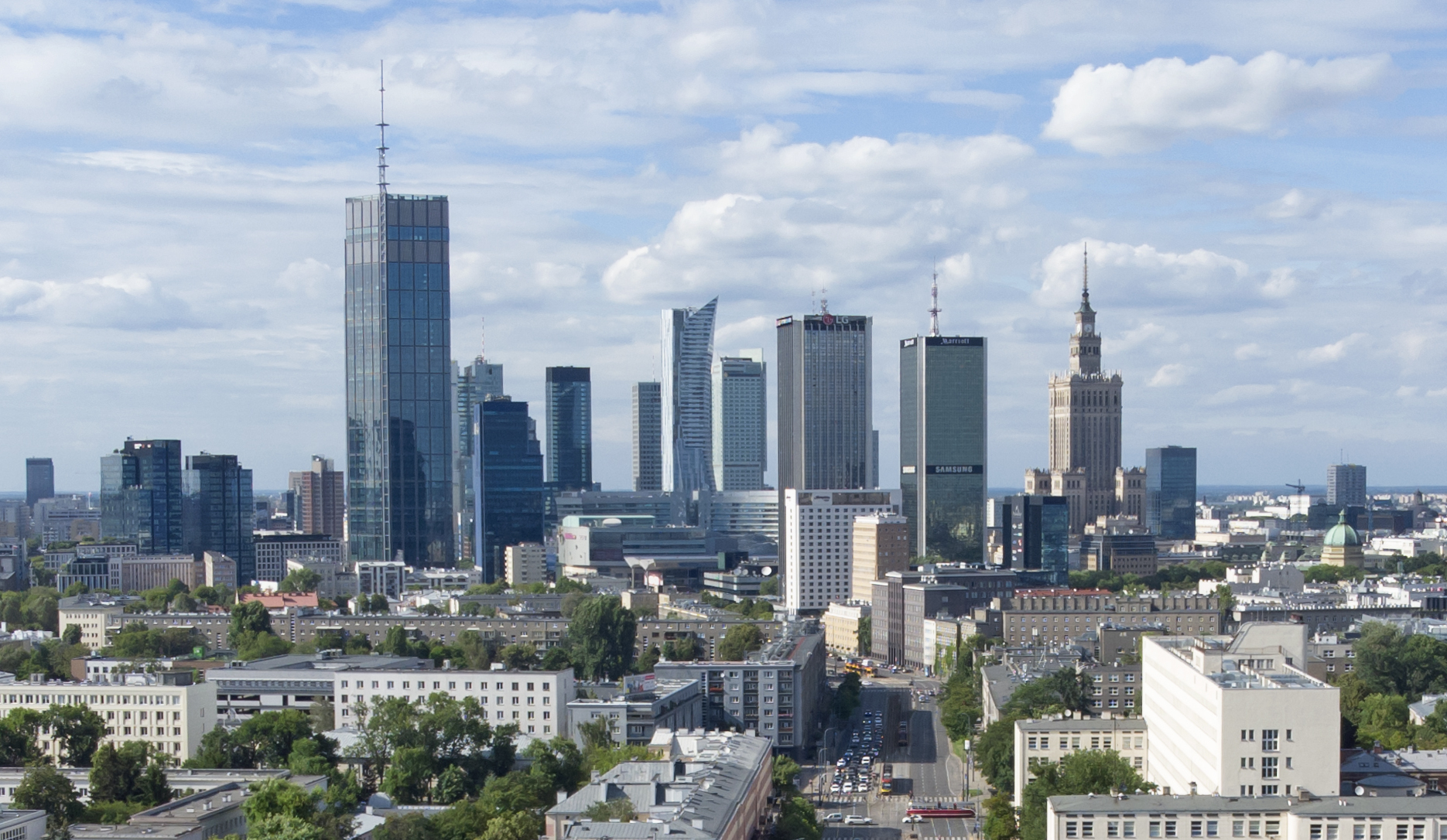
- Warsaw's skyline in 2022
- Tallest building: Varso Tower (2022)
- Tallest building height: 310 m (1,020 ft)
- First 150 m+ building: Palace of Culture and Science (1955)

Number of tall buildings (2026)
- Taller than 100 m (328 ft): 33
- Taller than 150 m (492 ft): 13
- Taller than 200 m (656 ft): 4
- Taller than 300 m (984 ft): 1

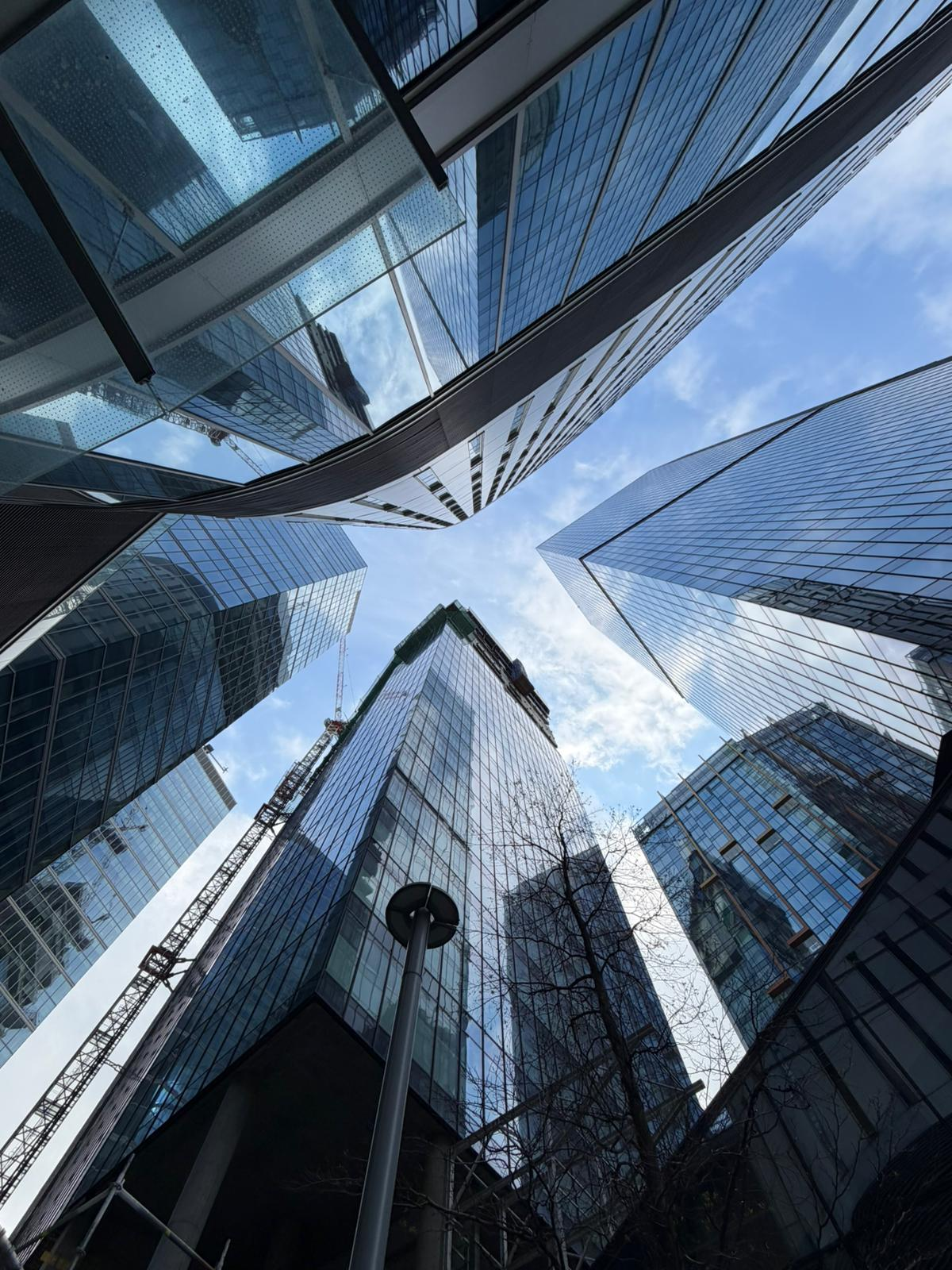
Streel level view of Warsaw skyscraper agglomeration

Warsaw is the capital and largest city of Poland. It is a major political, economic, and cultural centre in Central Europe, with a metropolitan area of over 3.2 million inhabitants. Warsaw is home to most of the tallest skyscrapers in Poland. The city is home to 33 high-rises taller than 100 m (328 ft), 13 of which have a height greater than 150 m (492 ft) as of 2026. Warsaw's skyline is the largest in Poland, and one of the largest in the European Union, rivalled only by that of Frankfurt and the Paris region. The tallest building in Warsaw is the 310 m (1,020 ft), 53-storey Varso Tower, which is also the tallest building in the European Union.

After the razing of Warsaw during World War II, the city was rebuilt under the Polish People's Republic. The Palace of Culture and Science, offered as a gift to Poland by the Soviet Union, was completed in 1955. At the time, it was one of the tallest buildings in the world, and the second tallest building outside of New York City. For much of the remaining 20th century, the Stalinist tower was by far the tallest landmark on the skyline, as little skyscraper development occurred; however, the addition of "blockhouse" estates throughout the city was common.

Following Poland's democratic and economic transition in 1989, high-rise construction surged in Warsaw, a trend that has continued since. The city's skyline has dramatically transformed during the 21st century, roughly tripling in size from 10 buildings over 100 m (328 ft) in height to 32 such buildings in 2025. Eight of the ten tallest buildings in Warsaw were finished after 2000. The majority of skyscrapers in Warsaw are office towers, reflecting the city's role as a financial hub. In 2022, the Varso Tower overtook the Palace of Culture and Science as Warsaw's tallest building. It is the tallest building in Europe outside of Russia.

Warsaw's skyscrapers are primarily concentrated in the central district of Śródmieście (often anglicized as Downtown), and Wola to its west. Śródmieście was the central focal point for the city's skyline from the 2000s to 2010s, but developments in the early 2020s have extended the skyline towards Wola. There are a few skyscrapers located outside the city centre, such as Forest in the northern neighbourhood of Powązki.

== History ==
Number of buildings by height in Warsaw by the end of each year. Click on the legend to toggle a specific height on or off. View chart definition.

=== 1900s–1940s ===
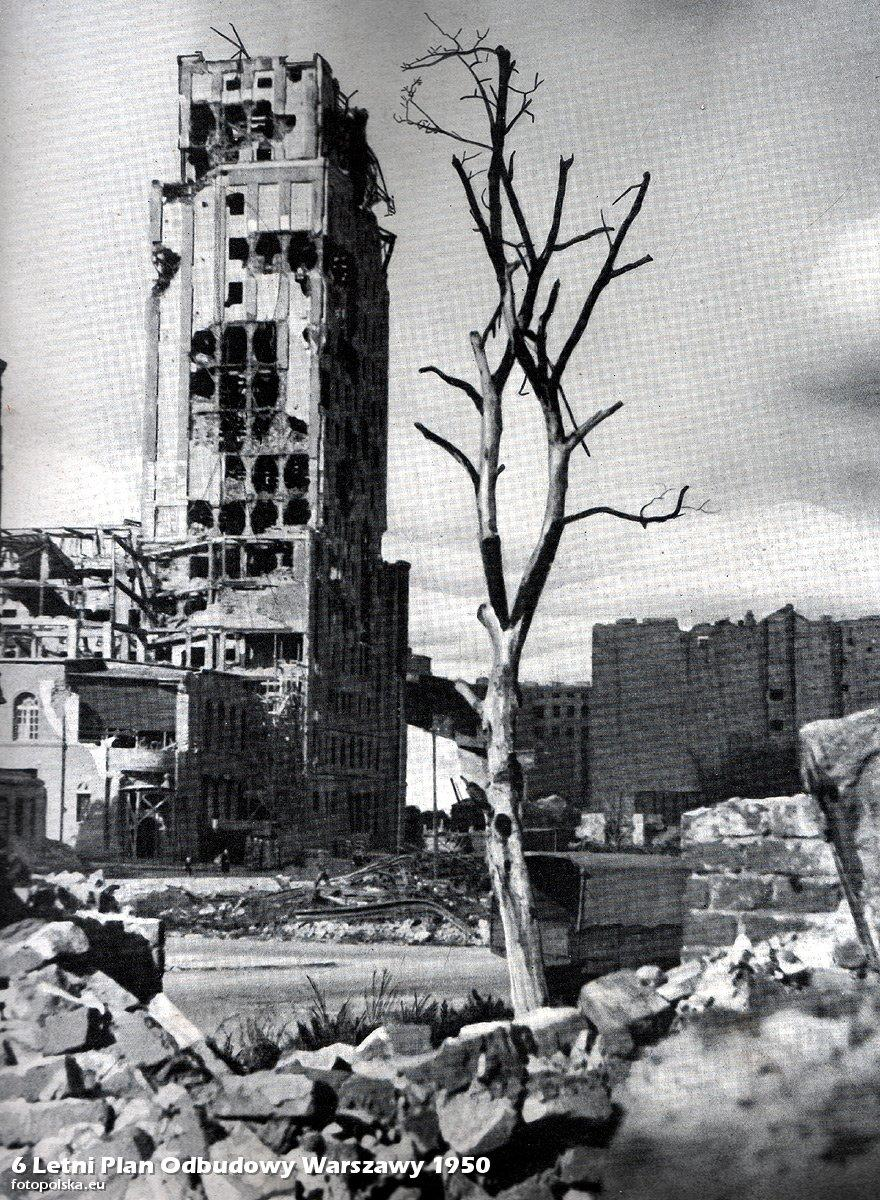
Prudential House, after suffering extensive damage during the Warsaw Uprising

The earliest high-rise in Warsaw, the 11-storey PASTa was completed in 1908. Originally housing the Swedish telephone firm Cedergren, it acquired its current name when it became the headquarters for PAST, the Polish Telephone Joint-stock Company, in 1922. According to some sources, it was the tallest building in the Russian Empire at the time. Another early skyscraper was Prudential House (now known as the Hotel Warszawa), a 17-storey high-rise built between 1931 and 1933 in the Art Deco style. At the time, it was one of the tallest skyscrapers in Europe. Prudential House "exemplied pure functionalism" with a simple cuboid form accentuated by geometric pilasters and a stepped narrowing of the upper floors. It originally served as the headquarters of the British insurance company Prudential. In 1936, the first television transmitter in Poland was installed on its roof.

Both buildings played a role during the Warsaw Uprising in World War II, with the PASTa building considered a strategic target by insurgents, as it was heavily defended by the Germans. The rebels succeeded in taking it on the 20th of August. The insurgents also gained control of Prudential House, and the Polish flag was briefly hung from the top. According to historian Alexandra Richie, when the flag was hoisted, "people left their homes just to look at it, crying and laughing and spontaneously singing the national anthem”. The building was later hit by a 2-ton German missile and approximately 1,000 artillery shells, which heavily damaged the building. Prudential House survived, and was rebuilt after the war as a hotel. Its design style was changed from early modern to socialist realism. The Hotel Warszawa opened in 1954 and included 375 rooms, a large restaurant, a café and a night club.

=== 1950s–1980s ===
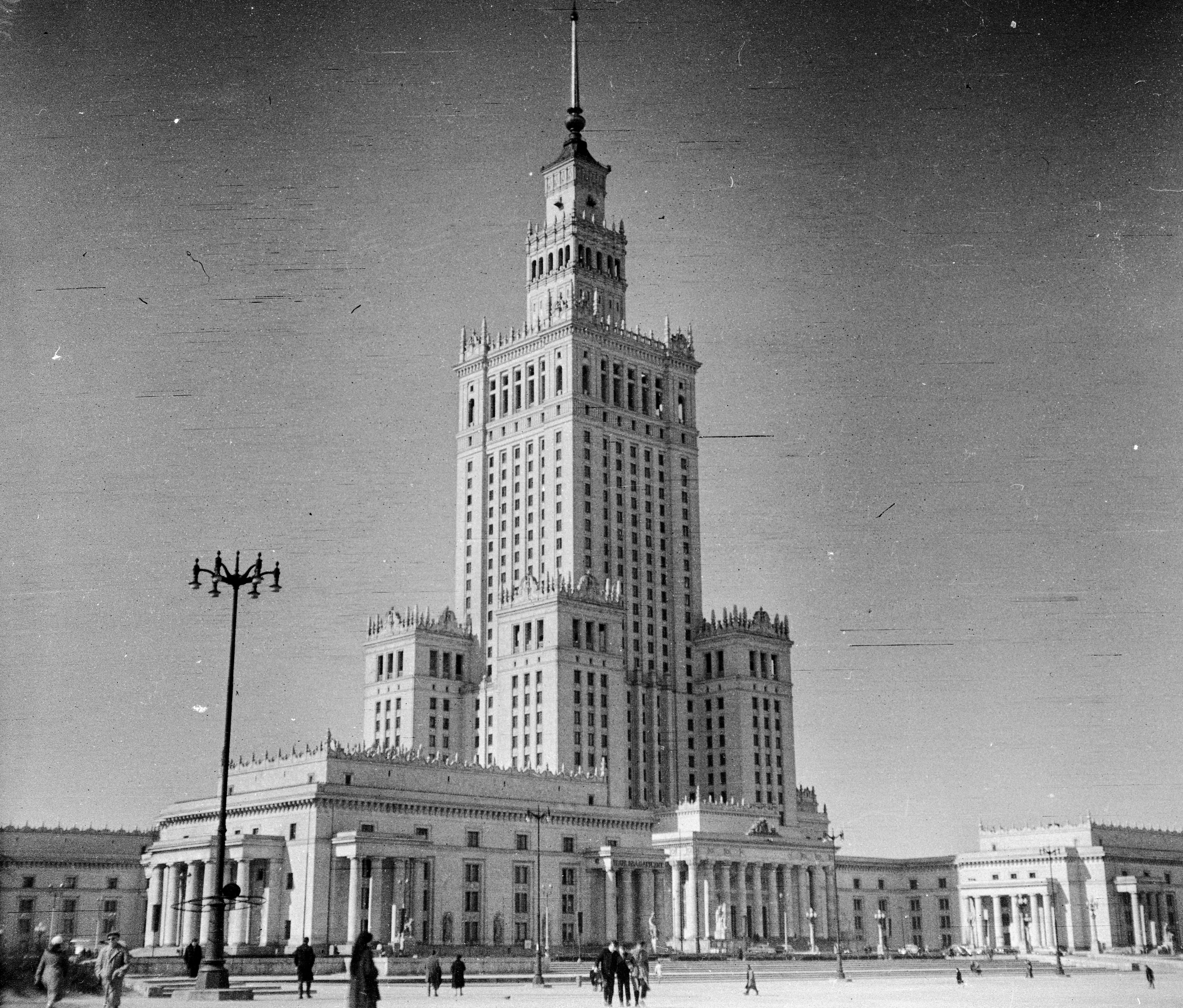
A 1960 photo of the Palace of Culture and Science

After World War II, Poland came under the control of a communist government, and the Polish People's Republic was proclaimed in 1952. In the same year, an agreement to build a new tower was signed between the Polish government and the Soviet Union. It was presented as a "gift" to the people of Poland. Construction of the Palace of Culture and Science began in May of 1952, and the skyscraper was completed in 1955. The tower was built using Soviet plans. It is estimated that between 3,500 and 5,000 Soviet guest workers and 4,000 local Polish workers participated in the project. The building shared many similarities to the Seven Sisters, a group of seven Stalinist skyscrapers in Moscow. Soviet-Russian architect Lev Rudnev incorporated Polish architectural details into the project after travelling around the country. For example, the parapets are modeled on Renaissance houses and the palaces of Kraków and Zamość.

Upon completion, at a height of 231 metres (737 ft), the tower was dedicated to Joseph Stalin, who had died two years prior. The Palace of Culture and Science was one of the tallest buildings in the world, and the second tallest in Europe and outside of New York City as a whole, only being surpassed by one of the Seven Sisters, the main building of the Moscow State University. Being significantly taller than any other building in Warsaw, the skyscraper dominated the city's skyline. The skyscraper remains controversial, as it is often viewed as a symbol of Soviet domination over Poland. Various politicians and nationalist groups, such as prime minister Mateusz Morawiecki, have called for its demolition. Polling has found that a comfortable majority of Poles would not support demolishing the building.

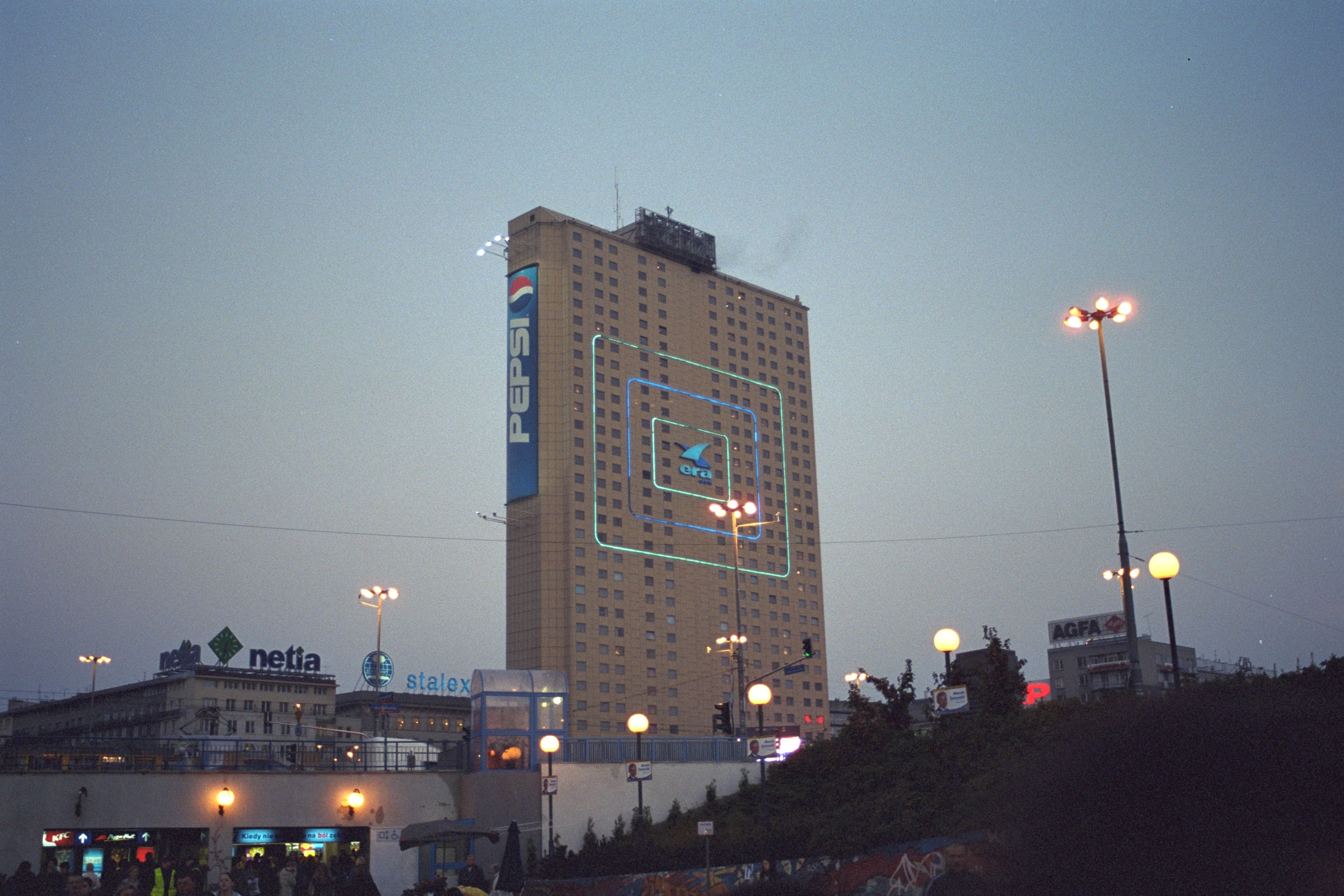
The original orange facade of the Novotel Warszawa Centrum

Besides the Palace of Culture and Science, post-war high-rise development was nearly absent otherwise until the 1970s. The next building to surpass 100 m (328 ft) in height was the Hotel Orbis Forum (now named the Novotel Warszawa Centrum) in 1974, built by the state-owned travel monopoly Orbis. The building's flat, rectangular shape, with rows of small windows and a brown facade, earned it the nickname "the chocolate bar". The building attracted artists such as ABBA, who stayed at the hotel in 1976. Intraco, an office tower in the Gdański Business Center, north of the city centre, was built in 1975. It was once home to Poland's Foreign Trade Headquarters (Centrala Handlu Zagranicznego). In 2025, it was announced that Intraco would be demolished and replaced with a new skyscraper, following attempts to modernize the building.

=== 1990s–present ===
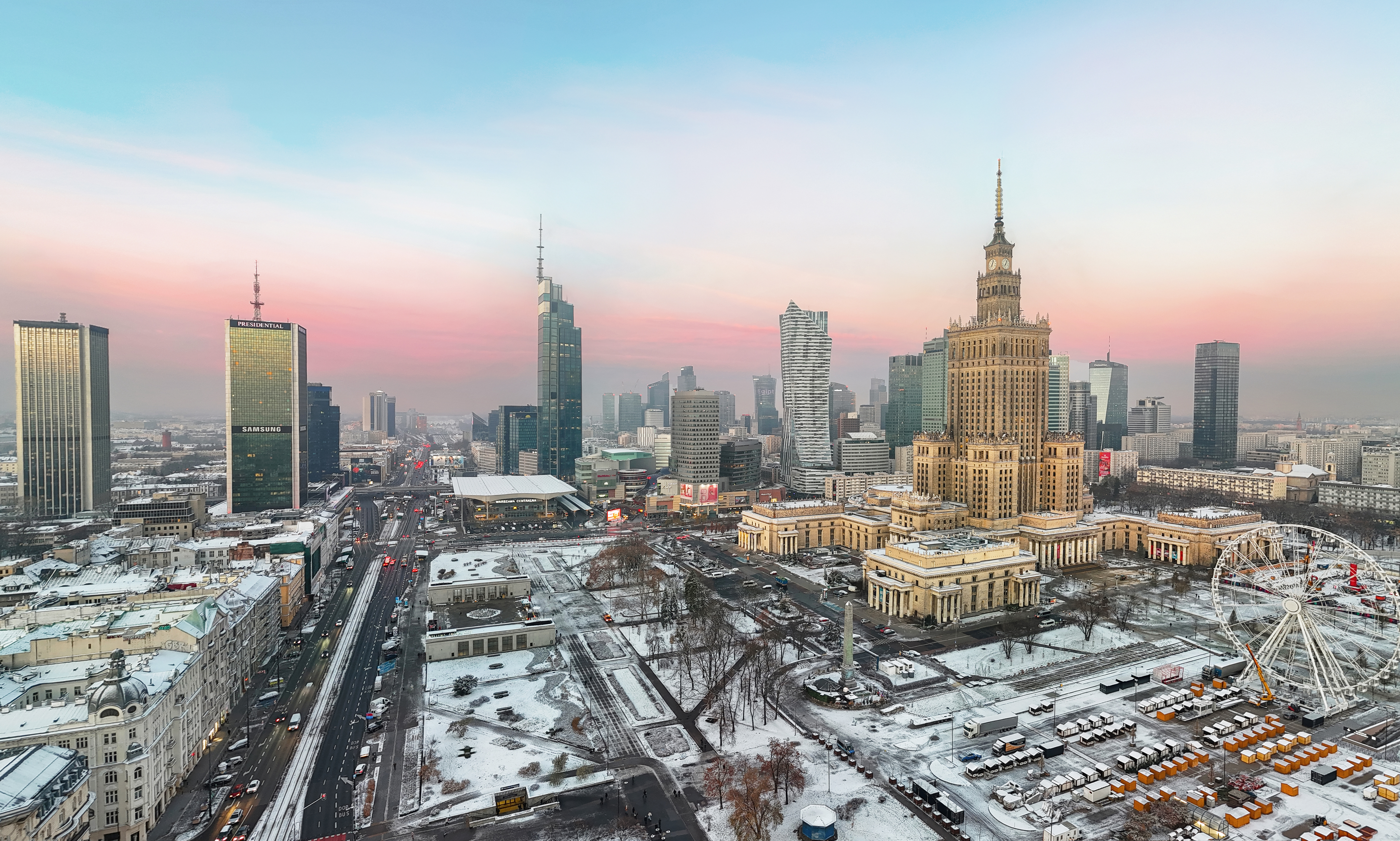
Warsaw's skyline in 2025

From 1989 to 1991, Poland engaged in a democratic transition which put an end to the Polish People's Republic and led to the foundation of a democratic government. The rate of skyscraper development notably increased from the 1990s onwards as the Polish economy boomed, leading Warsaw to become known for its modern skyline. Work on the Błękitny Wieżowiec (Blue Skyscraper) had begun in the 1960s, but construction was intermittent until its eventual completion in 1991. The tower sits on the site of the former Great Synagogue, which was destroyed by the Nazis in World War II. New towers built in this decade include the Orco Tower (now Central Tower), the Warsaw Financial Center, and the Warsaw Trade Tower, the latter of which became the city's second tallest building upon completion in 1999.

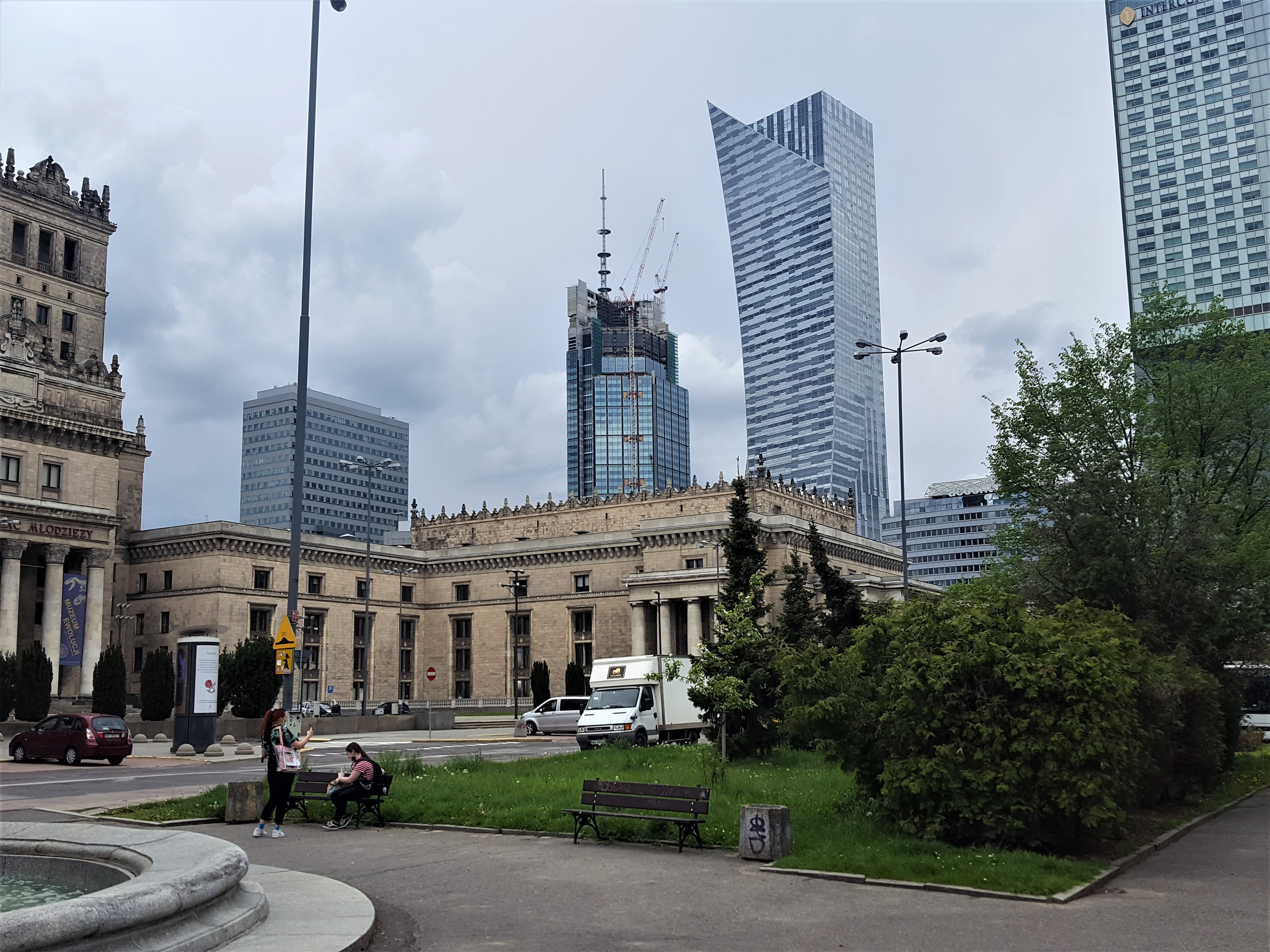
Varso Tower under construction (centre), with Złota 44 to the right

Warsaw's building boom continued into the 2000s, primarily building office skyscrapers such as Spektrum Tower (2001) and Rondo 1 (2006). However, the tallest building completed that decade was the InterContinental Warsaw in 2003, which had a height of 164 m (536 ft). It is known for its distinctive shape, with a section on the lower floors of the building appearing to be "cut out". The city's building boom was momentarily halted by the Great Recession from 2007 until the mid-2010s. There was a marked increase in height when the construction spree resumed, with all but four of Warsaw's skyscrapers taller than 150 m (492 ft) built after 2014.

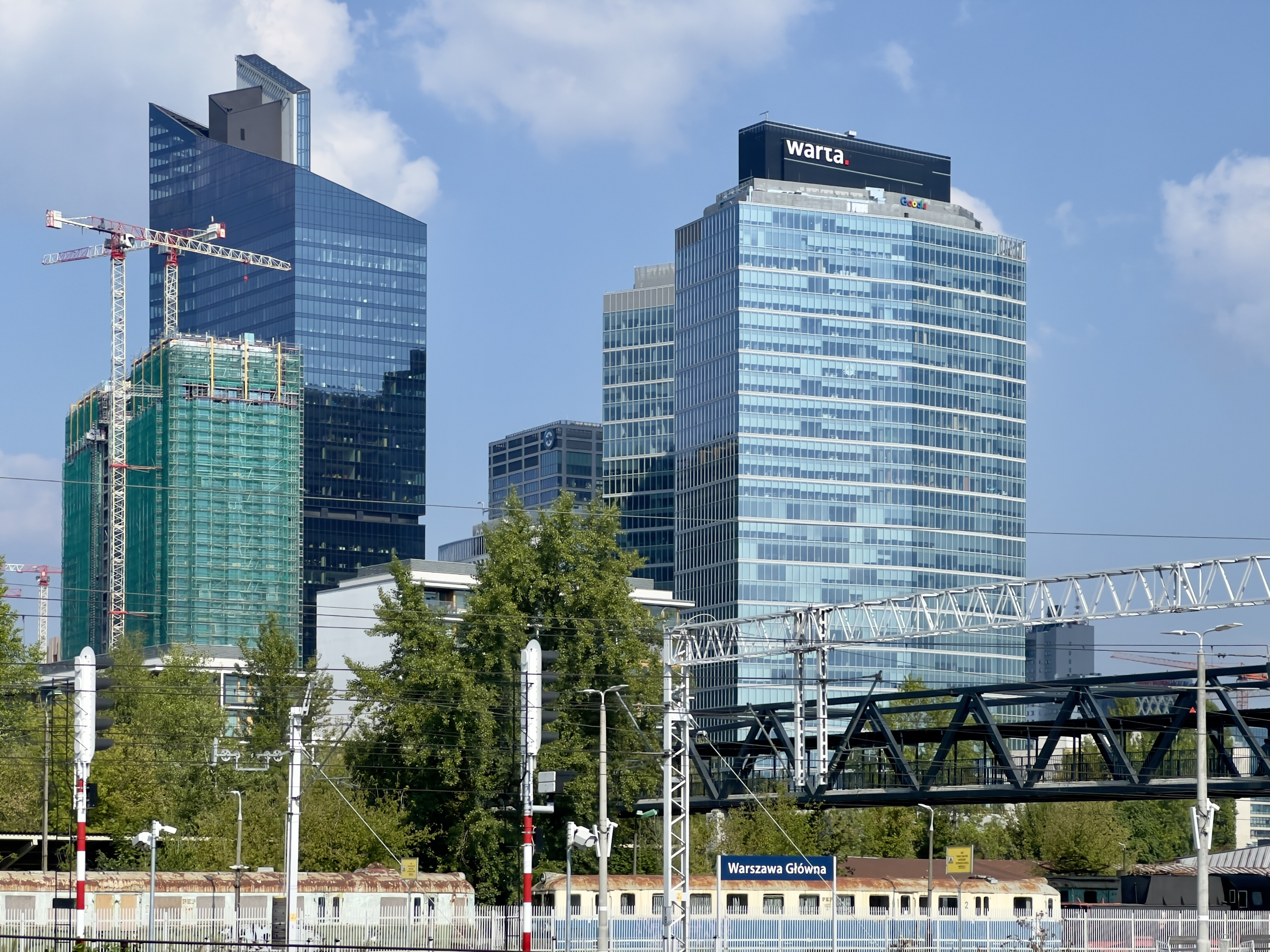
Skyliner and other new skyscrapers in Wola

The two tallest skyscrapers built in the 2010s were Warsaw Spire and Złota 44, both completed in 2016. Warsaw Spire, in Wola, is noted for its electronic sign that reads Kocham Warszawę ("I Love Warsaw" in English). The sail-shaped Złota 44 was designed by Polish-born architect Daniel Libeskind, who was inspired by the shape of an eagle's wing, symbolizing freedom and a changing Warsaw. The building's construction was slow and beset with financing issues, having been completed four years after topping out in 2012. With Warsaw Spire, Wola has emerged as a major area for skyscraper construction. Further additions to Wola have enlarged the skyline westwards in the early 2020s, including the skyscrapers Warsaw Unit and Skyliner, both finished in 2021. Directly north of Warsaw Spire, The Bridge was completed in 2025. A multi-tower project, Towarowa 22, is underway in Wola, on the site of Dom Słowa Polskiego (The House of the Polish Word), a former printing house, and an old shopping centre. The complex will include five skyscrapers up to 150 m (492 ft).

The Palace of Culture and Sciences, which had been Warsaw's tallest building for over 60 years, was finally surpassed in height by Varso Tower when it topped out in 2021. Varso Tower opened in 2022. It is the sixth-tallest building in Europe, the tallest in the European Union, and the tallest in Europe outside of Russia. The skyscrapers has a rectilinear form consisting of three volumes that stagger into one as they reach its tallest point at 230 m (755 ft). About a quarter of the building's height comes from its 80 m (262 ft) spire. The building has a direct link with the adjacent Warsaw Central Station. Two shorter buildings, named Varso 1 and Varso 2, are located next to the main tower. An observation deck is planned to open in 2025.

== Cityscape ==
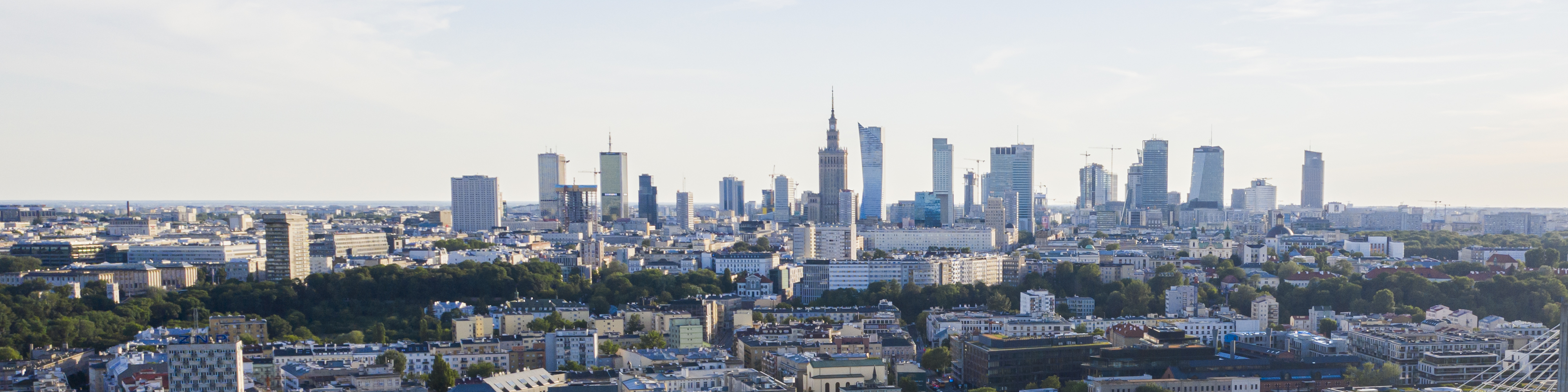
A panorama of Warsaw in 2020, featuring the Palace of Culture and Science (centre) and Złota 44 directly to its right

== Map of tallest buildings ==
This map shows the locations of buildings in Warsaw taller than 100 m (328 ft). Each marker is coloured by the decade of the building's completion. This map includes almost all buildings in Warsaw taller than that height; the exceptions are Forest, Intraco I, and Błękitny Wieżowiec, all of which are located north of the city centre.

Buildings taller than 100 m (328 ft) in Warsaw. An asterisk (*) next to the building's name indicates it is located outside the map.
- 1950s and before
- 1960s
- 1970s
- 1980s
- 1990s
- 2000s
- 2010s
- 2020s
1 Varso Tower
2 Palace of Culture and Science
3 Warsaw Spire
4 Warsaw Unit
5 Skyliner
6 Złota 44
7 Warsaw Trade Tower
8 The Bridge
9 Cosmopolitan Twarda 2/4
10 InterContinental Warsaw
11 Rondo 1
12 Q22
13 Skysawa
14 Warsaw Financial Center
15 LIM Center
16 Mennica Legacy Tower (East)
17 Generation Park Y
18 Oxford Tower
19 Warsaw Hub 1
20 Warsaw Hub 2
21 Spektrum Tower
22 Forest*
23 Orco Tower
24 Łucka City
25 Atlas Tower
26 Intraco I*
27 Novotel Warszawa Centrum
28 Skylight
29 Towarowa Tower (North)
30 Towarowa Tower (South)
31 Studio A
32 PZU Tower
33 Błękitny Wieżowiec*

== Tallest buildings ==
This lists ranks skyscrapers and high-rise buildings in Warsaw that stand at least 100 m (330 ft) tall as of 2026, based on standard height measurement as of 2025 This includes spires and architectural details but does not include antenna masts. The "Year" column indicates the year in which a building was completed. Buildings tied in height are sorted by year of completion with earlier buildings ranked first, and then alphabetically.

Was the tallest building in Warsaw upon completion

Rank	Name	Image	Location	Height m (ft)	Floors	Year	Purpose	Notes
1	Varso Tower		52°13′44″N 21°00′01″E	310 (1,020)	53	2022	Office	Tallest building in Warsaw, in Poland, and in the European Union since 2022. The only supertall skyscraper in the European Union. Tallest building completed in Warsaw in the 2020s. The spire has a height of 80 m (260 ft).
2	Palace of Culture and Science		52°13′55″N 21°00′22″E	230.7 (757)	42	1955	Office	Tallest building in Warsaw and in Poland from 1955 to 2022. Tallest building completed in Warsaw in the 1950s and in the 20th century as a whole.
3	Warsaw Spire		52°13′56″N 20°59′03″E	220 (720)	49	2016	Office	Tallest building completed in Warsaw in the 2010s.
4	Warsaw Unit		52°13′49″N 20°59′08″E	200.7 (658)	46	2021	Office	
5	Skyliner		52°13′46″N 20°59′01″E	195.1 (640)	45	2021	Office	
6	Złota 44		52°13′53″N 21°00′09″E	192 (630)	52	2016	Residential	Tallest residential building in Warsaw.
7	Warsaw Trade Tower		52°14′07″N 20°58′57″E	187.2 (614)	43	1999	Office	Tallest building completed in Warsaw in the 1990s.
8	The Bridge		52°14′00″N 20°59′00″E	174 (571)	40	2025	Office	
9	Cosmopolitan Twarda 2/4		52°14′08″N 21°00′06″E	165.4 (543)	45	2014	Residential	
10	InterContinental Warsaw		52°13′56″N 21°00′09″E	163.5 (536)	45	2003	Hotel	Tallest hotel building in Warsaw. Tallest building completed in Warsaw in the 2000s.
11	Rondo 1		52°13′58″N 20°59′58″E	159.2 (522)	40	2006	Office	
12	Q22		52°14′08″N 20°59′53″E	155 (509)	42	2016	Office	
13	Skysawa		52°14′02″N 21°00′00″E	155 (509)	36	2022	Office	
14	Warsaw Financial Center		52°14′01″N 21°00′06″E	143.9 (472)	35	1999	Office	
15	LIM Center		52°13′40″N 21°00′17″E	140 (460)	43	1989	Mixed-use	Also known by its Polish name, Centrum LIM, or the Hotel Marriott. Mixed-use office and hotel skyscraper.
16	Mennica Legacy Tower, East Building		52°13′58″N 20°59′34″E	140 (460)	35	2020	Office	
17	Generation Park Y		52°13′52″N 20°59′07″E	140 (460)	38	2021	Office	
18	Oxford Tower		52°13′34″N 21°00′15″E	139 (456)	42	1978	Office	Also known by its address, Chałubińskiego 8.
19	Warsaw Hub 1		52°13′42″N 20°59′05″E	130.3 (427)	32	2020	Office	
20	Warsaw Hub 2		52°13′44″N 20°59′05″E	130.3 (427)	32	2020	Office	
21	Spektrum Tower		52°14′05″N 20°59′58″E	122 (400)	30	2001	Office	Formerly known as TP S.A. Tower.
22	Forest		52°15′21″N 20°58′49″E	120 (390)	29	2022	Office	
23	Orco Tower		52°13′37″N 21°00′06″E	115 (377)	26	1996	Office	Also known as Central Towr or FIM Tower.
24	Łucka City		52°13′55″N 20°59′16″E	112 (367)	30	2004	Residential	
25	Atlas Tower		52°13′29″N 20°59′29″E	112 (367)	28	1999	Office	Formerly known as Millennium Plaza.
26	Intraco I		52°15′16″N 20°59′48″E	107 (351)	39	1975	Office	
27	Novotel Warszawa Centrum		52°13′46″N 21°00′48″E	106 (348)	33	1974	Hotel	
28	Skylight		52°13′49″N 21°00′13″E	105 (344)	26	2007	Office	Part of the Złote Tarasy complex, or Golden Terraces in English.
29	Towarowa Tower (North)		52°13′46″N 20°59′11″E	105 (344)	29	2024	Residential	
30	Towarowa Tower (South)		52°13′45″N 20°59′12″E	105 (344)	29	2024	Residential	
31	Studio A		52°13′55″N 20°59′22″E	105 (344)	27	2026	Office	
32	PZU Tower		52°14′11″N 20°59′52″E	104 (341)	26	2007	Office	
33	Błękitny Wieżowiec		52°14′39″N 21°00′09″E	100 (330)	29	1991	Office	Also known by the English translation of its name, Blue Tower.

== Tallest under construction or proposed ==
=== Under construction ===
The following table ranks skyscrapers and high-rises under construction in Warsaw that are expected to be at least 100 m (328 ft) tall as of 2026, based on standard height measurement. The “Year” column indicates the expected year of completion. Buildings that are on hold are not included.

Name	Height m (ft)	Floors	Purpose	Year	Notes
Towarowa 22 Afi Tower	150 (490)	35	Office	2028	
Liberty Residences	140 (460)	43	Residential	2027	
Upper One	131.5 (431)	34	Office	2026	
Skyliner II	130 (430)	33	Office	2026	
Towarowa 22 Motion Tower	125 (410)	32	Residential	2028	

=== Proposed ===
The following table ranks approved and proposed skyscrapers in Warsaw that are expected to be at least 100 m (328 ft) tall as of 2026, based on standard height measurement. The “Year” column indicates the expected year of completion. A dash “–“ indicates information about the building’s height or year of completion is not available.

Name	Height m (ft)	Floors	Purpose	Year	Status	Notes
Oxford Tower II	248 (814)	–	–	–	Proposed	
Centralna Park	200 (660)	–	–	–	Proposed	
Nowa Emilia	196 (643)	40	–	–	Proposed	
Lilium Tower	193 (633)	–	Office	–	Approved	
Srebrna Tower	190 (620)	50	–	–	Proposed	
Warsaw One	187.8 (616)	43	Office	–	Approved	
Oxford Tower I	180 (590)	–	–	–	Proposed	
Roma Tower	170 (560)	46	–	–	Approved (Demolition)	
Skyreach	170 (560)	48	Office	–	On Hold	
Port Praski 1	160 (520)	–	–	–	Approved	
Chmielna 75	150 (492)	–	–	–	Proposed	
Liberty Residence	140 (460)	41	Residential	–	Approved	
Chopin Tower	130 (430)	–	–	–	Approved	
Sobieski Tower	130 (430)	34	–	–	Approved	
Spark	130 (430)	30	–	–	Approved	
Towarowa 22 Tower 2	120 (394)	–	–	–	Approved	
Towarowa 22 Tower 3	110 (361)	–	–	–	Approved	
Marszałkowska 91-97	106 (348)	–	–	–	Proposed	
Biurowiec WAN	100 (330)	28	–	–	Proposed	

== Timeline of tallest buildings ==
Building	Image	Years as tallest	Height m (ft)	Floors
PAST Building		1908–1934	51.5 (169)	11
Prudential House		1934–1955	66 (217)	18
Palace of Culture and Science		1955–2022	230.7 (757)	42
Varso Tower		2022–present	310 (1,020)	53

== See also ==
- List of tallest buildings in Poland
