= Orbis =

Orbis may refer to:

== Companies ==
- Orbis Books, an American publishing imprint of the Maryknoll order
- Orbis Business Intelligence, a British private intelligence firm
- Orbis Publishing, a British publisher of partworks and books
- Orbis Technology, a British bookmaker software company later called OpenBet
- Orbis (Polish travel agency), a Polish travel agency, established in 1920

== Entertainment ==
- Orbis (audio drama), a Doctor Who audio play
- Orbis, a 2002 alternative history novel by Scott Mackay

== Periodicals ==
- Orbis (journal), a quarterly journal of international affairs
- Vanderbilt Orbis, a progressive student newspaper at Vanderbilt University in Nashville, Tennessee

== Other uses ==
- Orbis, Rhineland-Palatinate, Germany, a municipality
- Orbis Cascade Alliance, an academic library consortia in the U.S. states of Washington, Oregon and Idaho
- Orbis International (the "Flying Eye Hospital"), a charitable organization devoted to treating and preventing blindness
- a development kit for PlayStation 4
  - Orbis OS, the proprietary operating system used by PlayStation 4
- Orbiting Binary Black Hole Investigation Satellite (ORBIS), a space telescope in development by Japan
- ORBIS (USAF satellite), a series communications satellites exploring atmospheric ducting
- ORBIS: The Stanford Geospatial Network Model of the Roman World, an interactive site co-developed by Walter Scheidel
- a company database provided by Bureau van Dijk

== See also ==
- Orbiso, a village in Montaña Alavesa, Spain
