= Cosmopolitan Twarda 2/4 =

Residential skyscraper

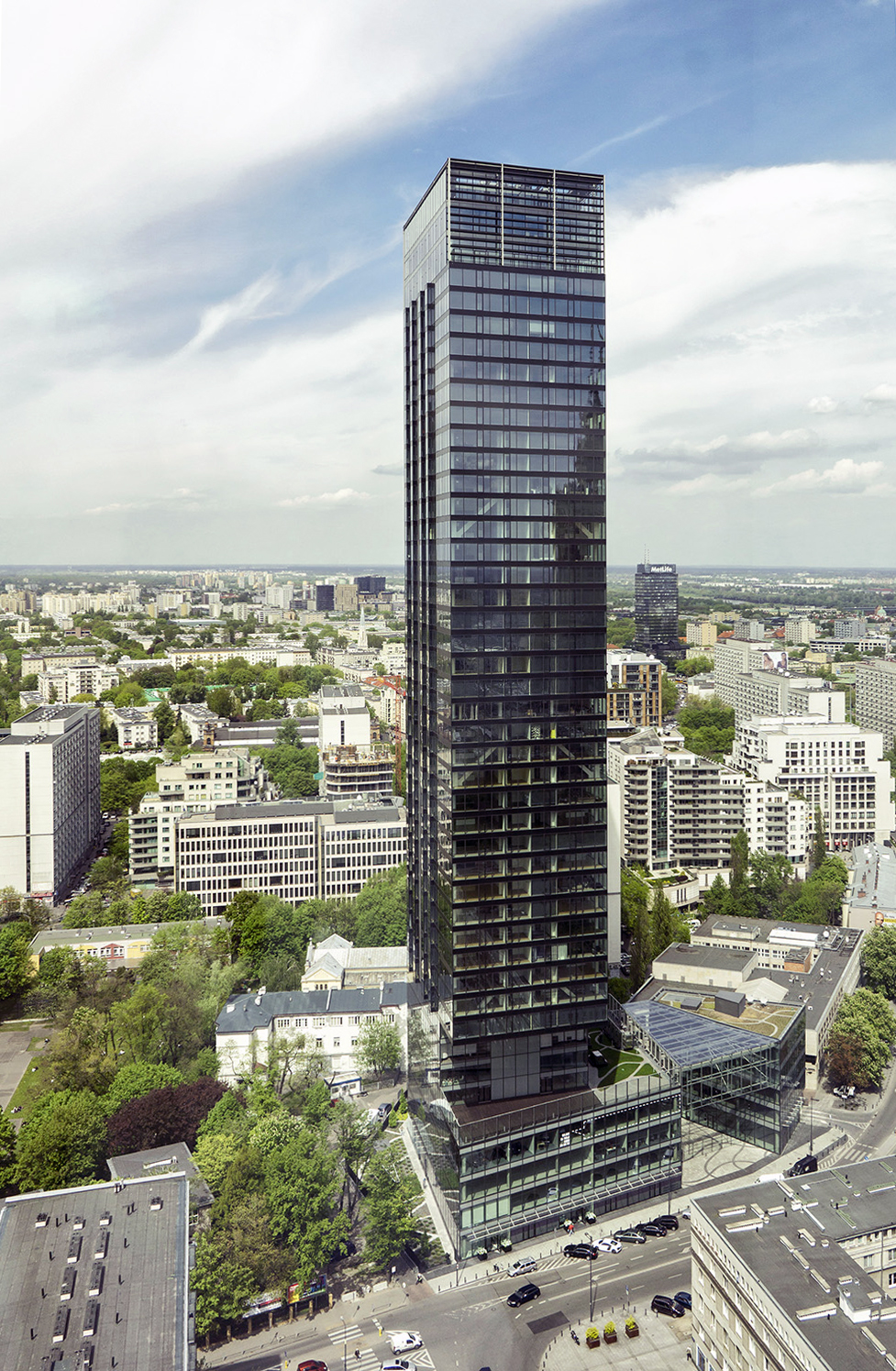
- Interactive map of the Cosmopolitan Twarda 2/4 area

General information
- Status: Completed
- Type: Residential
- Architectural style: Neomodern
- Location: Warsaw, Poland, Twarda 2/4
- Coordinates: 52°14′6″N 21°00′1″E
- Construction started: 2010
- Completed: 2014

Height
- Roof: 160 m (520 ft)

Technical details
- Floor count: 44
- Floor area: 60,939 m^{2} (655,940 sq ft)

Design and construction
- Architect: Helmut Jahn
- Developer: Tacit Development Polska

Other information
- Number of suites: 254
- Parking: 299 cars

Cosmopolitan Twarda 2/4, formerly known as Twarda Tower or Hines Tower, is a mainly residential skyscraper (160 meters high, 44 storeys) in central Warsaw, Poland. The project was developed by Tacit Development Polska.

The tower includes 252 apartments ranging from 54 to 198 square metres (580 to 2,130 sq ft), with a net total area of above-ground floors of as much as 32,000 m^{2} (340,000 sq ft). Four penthouses are planned to be situated on the top floor. Its ground floor along Twarda Street is to provide commercial space for shops and services and its underground part has been designed to accommodate a 300-vehicle car park.

The first plans of building developed on this plot were revealed in 2006 when Foundation Shalom appointed leading Polish architect Stefan Kuryłowicz to design a tower. Soon after the Foundation was forced through lack of funds to sell the plot to Tacit Development. A new design was prepared by German architect Helmut Jahn. Up to 2011 Hines was the developer of the scheme, but Tacit, the investor behind the scheme, took it over.

Cosmopolitan Twarda 2/4 was the tallest completed residential building in Warsaw, and second in Poland (after Sky Tower in Wrocław). It fell to third place upon Złota 44's completion.

== See also ==
- List of tallest buildings in Poland
- List of tallest buildings in Warsaw
