= InterContinental Warsaw =

Hotel in Poland

Coordinates: 52.232307°N 21.002544°E

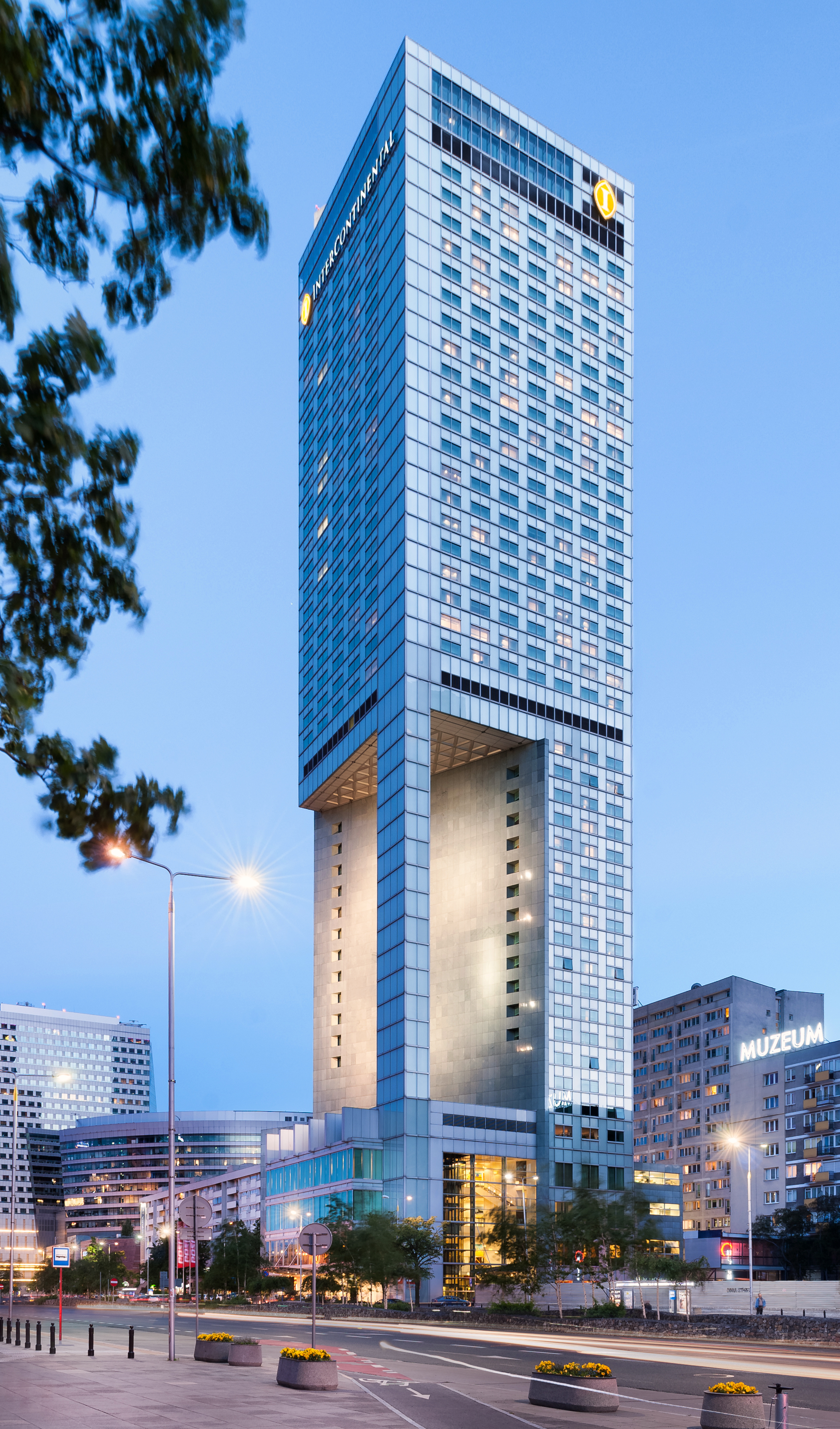
- Hotel chain: InterContinental

General information
- Status: Completed
- Type: Hotel
- Architectural style: Neomodern
- Location: Warsaw, Poland, Emilii Plater 49
- Construction started: March 2001
- Completed: November 2003

Height
- Architectural: 164 m (538 ft)
- Roof: 154 m (505 ft)

Technical details
- Floor count: 45
- Floor area: 57,500 m^{2} (619,000 sq ft)
- Lifts/elevators: 10

Design and construction
- Architect: Tadeusz Spychała

Other information
- Number of rooms: 414
- Number of suites: 76
- Parking: 175 cars

Website
- www.warszawa.intercontinental.com

InterContinental Warsaw is a five-star hotel in Warsaw, located between Emilia Plater, Śliska, and Sosnowa Streets.

== History ==
It was designed by a team of architects under the leadership of Tadeusz Spychała. Its construction started in 2001 and ended in November 2003. It is the tallest hotel in Poland, the third-tallest in Europe, and one of the tallest five-star hotels in the world.

The building is characterised by its unusual shape and is finished in pea-green tones, like the adjacent Warsaw Financial Center. The building houses 414 rooms of various standards, including the presidential suite, 76 luxury suites with kitchenettes, and has 13 conference rooms. The building also has a ballroom, two bars, two restaurants, an E. Wedel chocolate fountain, sauna, fitness club, spa, and solarium. A modern swimming pool, located on the 43rd and 44th floors (150 meters above the ground) is the highest indoor swimming pool in Europe. Underground, spread over five levels, there is a car park for 175 vehicles. Construction of the building cost more than 100 million Euros.

In order to build the skyscraper, the site was closed for almost a year and a legendary Polish jazz club, Akwarium, had to be demolished (it was relocated to the nearby Złote Tarasy shopping complex). The inhabitants of the surrounding blocks protested against the new building, claiming that it would obscure the sun. Ultimately, an agreement with the residents was reached - thanks to the building's "cut out" shape, nearby buildings' access to light is less restricted.

The InterContinental Warszawa is the third tallest hotel in Europe after Russia's Hotel Ukraina and Spain's Gran Hotel Bali. The hotel has the deepest foundation of all the skyscrapers in Poland, with a depth of 20.7 metres.. The hotel is located opposite the house of the well-known pianist Władysław Szpilman.

== See also ==
- List of tallest buildings in Poland
- Architecture of Warsaw
- Branicki Residential House
