= Skyliner (Warsaw) =

Skyscraper in Warsaw, Poland

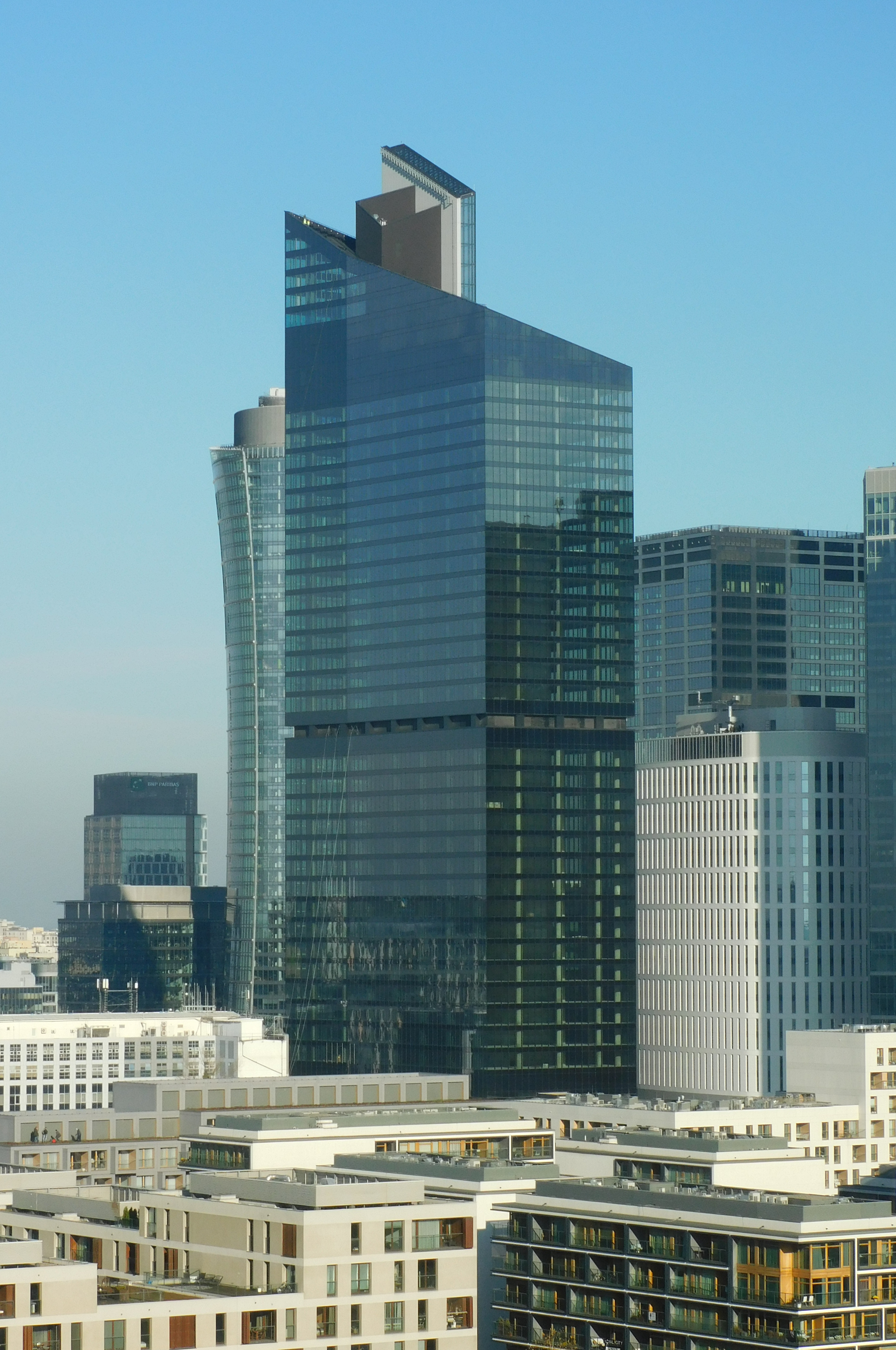
- Skyliner in 2020.
- Interactive map of the Skyliner area

General information
- Status: Completed
- Type: Office
- Location: Warsaw, Poland, 67 Prosta Street
- Coordinates: 52°13′45.17″N 20°59′01.26″E
- Construction started: 2017
- Completed: 2021

Height
- Architectural: 195 metres (640 ft)
- Tip: 195 metres (640 ft)
- Roof: 195 metres (640 ft)

Technical details
- Floor count: 45
- Floor area: 72,000 m^{2} (780,000 sq ft)

Design and construction
- Architecture firm: APA Wojciechowski Architekci
- Developer: Karimpol Group

Website
- skylinerbykarimpol.pl

Skyliner, sometimes also referred to as Skyliner I, is a skyscraper in the Czyste neighbourhood of Warsaw, Poland, opened in 2021. It is planned to be joined with Skyliner II, which is currently under construction, forming a complex of twin buildings.

== Design and technical details ==
The Skyliner building is located at 67 Prosta Street, near Ignacego Daszyńskiego Roundabout, at the exit to the Rondo Daszyńskiego station of the Warsaw Metro. Skyliner II is being constructed next to it, connecting the two buildings at the base.

The building is 195 m (639.76 ft.) tall, and 45 storeys high. It is the 6th tallest building in the city, and the 7th tallest building in Poland.

Its first four storeys contain commercial and service areas, including stores, restaurants, coffeehouses. They total area is 3000 m^{2} (32 291.73 sq ft). 30 storeys of the building house office spaces, which have an area of 43 633 m^{2} (469 662 sq ft). In total, the building has a floor area of 72 000 m^{2} (775 002 sq ft). At the height of 165 m (541 ft), on two storeys is located Sky Bar, a bar with view onto the city panorama.

The building has 430 car park spaces, and 300 bike spaces.

Skyliner is classified in the BREEAM system as "Excellent".

== History ==
The construction of the building had been financed by Karimpol Group, and it was designed by the architectural firm of APA Wojciechowski Architekci. The construction had begun in September 2017, and was finished in January 2021.

In 2022, the building had been awarded the 3rd Award (III Nagroda) at the 26th edition of the Polski Cement w Architekturze, an award for best building design using the Reinforced concrete, awarded by the Association of Polish Architects and the Association of Cement Manufacturers.
