= Mennica Legacy Tower =

Complex of two office buildings in Warsaw, Poland

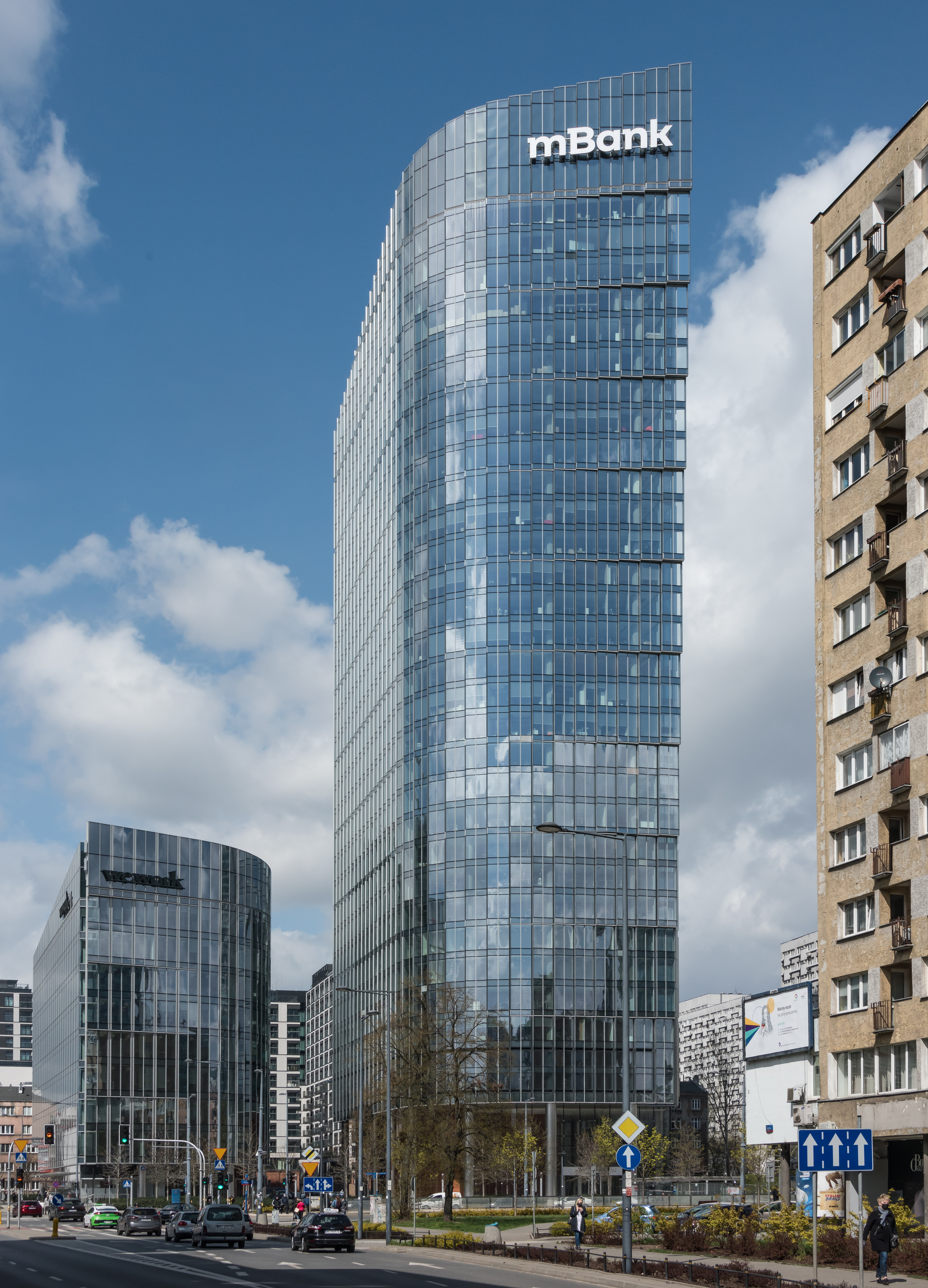
- The complex in 2021
- Interactive map of the Mennica Legacy Tower area

General information
- Type: Office skyscraper
- Architectural style: Modern; Neomodern; International Style
- Location: Wola, Warsaw, Poland, 18 Prosta Street
- Coordinates: 52°13′57.65″N 20°59′35.02″E
- Construction started: October 2016
- Completed: 2020
- Owner: Golub GetHouse; Mint of Poland

Height
- Architectural: 140 m (skyscraper); 43 m (smaller building)

Technical details
- Floor count: 32 (skyscraper); 9 (smaller building)
- Floor area: 65,630 m² (total); 50,750 m² (skyscraper); 14,880 m² (smaller building)

Design and construction
- Architecture firm: Goettsch Partners
- Developer: Golub GetHouse; Mint of Poland
- Main contractor: Warbud

The Mennica Legacy Tower (Polish: [mɛnˈɲi.t͡sa]) is a complex of two office buildings in Warsaw, Poland, located at 18 Prosta Street, in the neighbourhood of Mirów, within the district of Wola. It includes a 140-metre-tall skyscraper mBank Tower (Polish: Wieża mBank) with 32 storeys, and a smaller 43-metre-tall office building with 9 storeys. It was completed in 2020.

== History ==
The building complex was designed by Chicago-based architecture firm Goettsch Partners, in cooperation with firm Epstein. It was an joint investment of Golub GetHouse and the Mint of Poland, both of which now have offices in the building. The Warsaw-based construction company Warbud was hired as the general contractor. They were constructed in place of the headquarters builting of Mint of Poland.

The construction begun in October 2016. In 2019, the west building was rented entirely by company WeWork. In 2020, most of the east building was rented to mBank, which ten renamed it to the mBank Tower (Polish: Wieża mBank).

== Characteristics ==
The complex consists of two buildings, a 140-metre tall skyscraper, known as the mBank Tower (Polish: Wieża mBank), and a 43-metre-tall office building. The skyscraper, which houses the headquarters of the mBank, has 32 storeys, and floor area of 50,750 m^{2}. It includes a large lobby with a celling at 12 m. The lower office building, rented by company WeWork, has 9 storeys, and a floor area of 14,880 m^{2}. Their design combines elements of modern, neomodern, and International Style, and includes a rounded glass-covered façade. Aside of the office spaces, an area of 4,500 m^{2} is relocated to stores and services. Between buildings are placed two small plazas, with greenery. The property meets the requirements of the international BREEAM environmental certificate.

== See also ==
- List of tallest buildings in Warsaw
- List of tallest buildings in Poland
