= Towarowa Towers =

Residential skyscraper complex in Warsaw, Poland

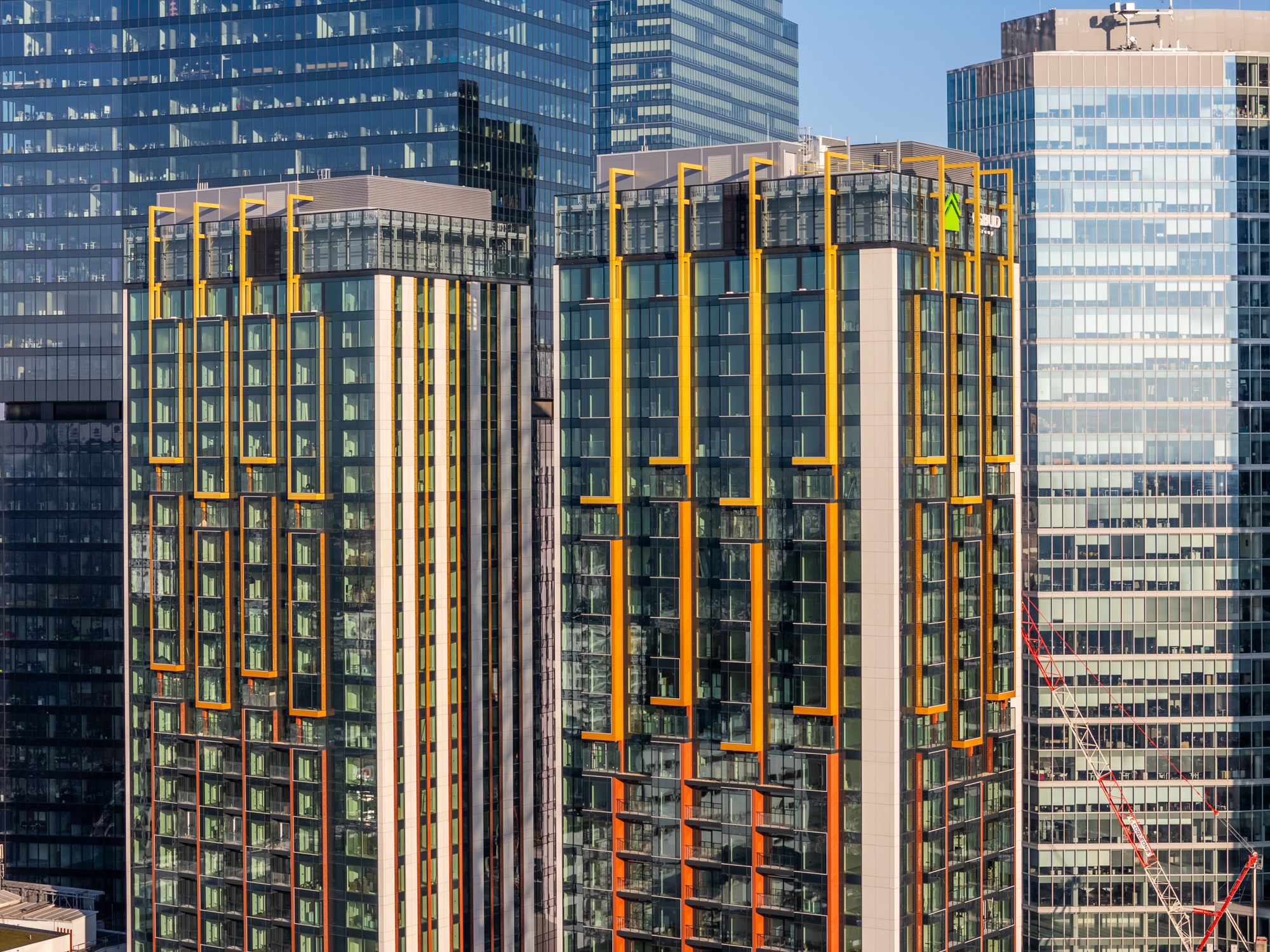
- The buildings in 2026.

General information
- Type: Residential skyscraper
- Architectural style: Modernist
- Location: 69C/69D Prosta Street, Wola, Warsaw, Poland
- Coordinates: 52°13′45″N 20°58′58″E
- Construction started: April 2021
- Completed: November 2024
- Owner: Asbud

Height
- Tip: 105 m
- Roof: 95 m

Technical details
- Floor count: 29

Design and construction
- Architecture firm: FS&P Arcus
- Developer: Asbud
- Main contractor: Hochtief Polska

Other information
- Number of suites: 577

Towarowa Towers (Polish: [tɔ.vaˈrɔ.va]; lit. 'Cargo Street Towers') are two modernist twin residential skyscrapers in Warsaw, Poland, located at 69C and 69D Prosta Street, in the neighbourhood of Czyste within the district of Wola. They have 29 storeys, with a total height of 105 m, with roof at 95, and offer 577 apartment units. The complex was opened in 2024.

== History ==
Towarowa Towers were an investment of company Asbud. They were designed by architecture firm FS&P Arcus, and constructed by Hochtief Polska. Their construction lasted from April 2021 to November 2024. First residents moved into the building in August 2025.

== Characteristics ==
The complex consist of two twin 29-storey-tall buildings, with total height of 105 m, with roof at 95 m. They have minimalist modernist glass façade, broken up with protruding colourful bay windows, which are illuminated at night. In total, they have 577 apartment units, which size ranges from 25 do 140 m², and from one to four rooms. They are decorated in the modernist style. The complex also features communal areas for residents, including a lobby with a reception desk, fully equipped gyms, lounge areas, business meeting rooms, a green courtyard with street furniture, and an outdoor communal terrace with an area of approximately 900 m².

== Awards ==
- European Property Awards 2022–2023, in the categories Residential High Rise Development, Residential High Rise Architecture, as well as the Five Stars award, which is presented to the highest-scoring project in a given category.
- The Gold Winner title at the TITAN Property Awards 2022 in the category: Property Development – Residential High Rise.
- The Gold Winner title in the Global Future Design Awards 2023 in the high-rise residential projects category.
- Exceptional Business Achievement Award 2023 by the Warsaw Business Journal in the category Real Estate Development of the Year.
- The Silver Winner title at the New York Architectural Design Awards 2024.
