= Orbis (Polish travel agency) =

Polish travel agency

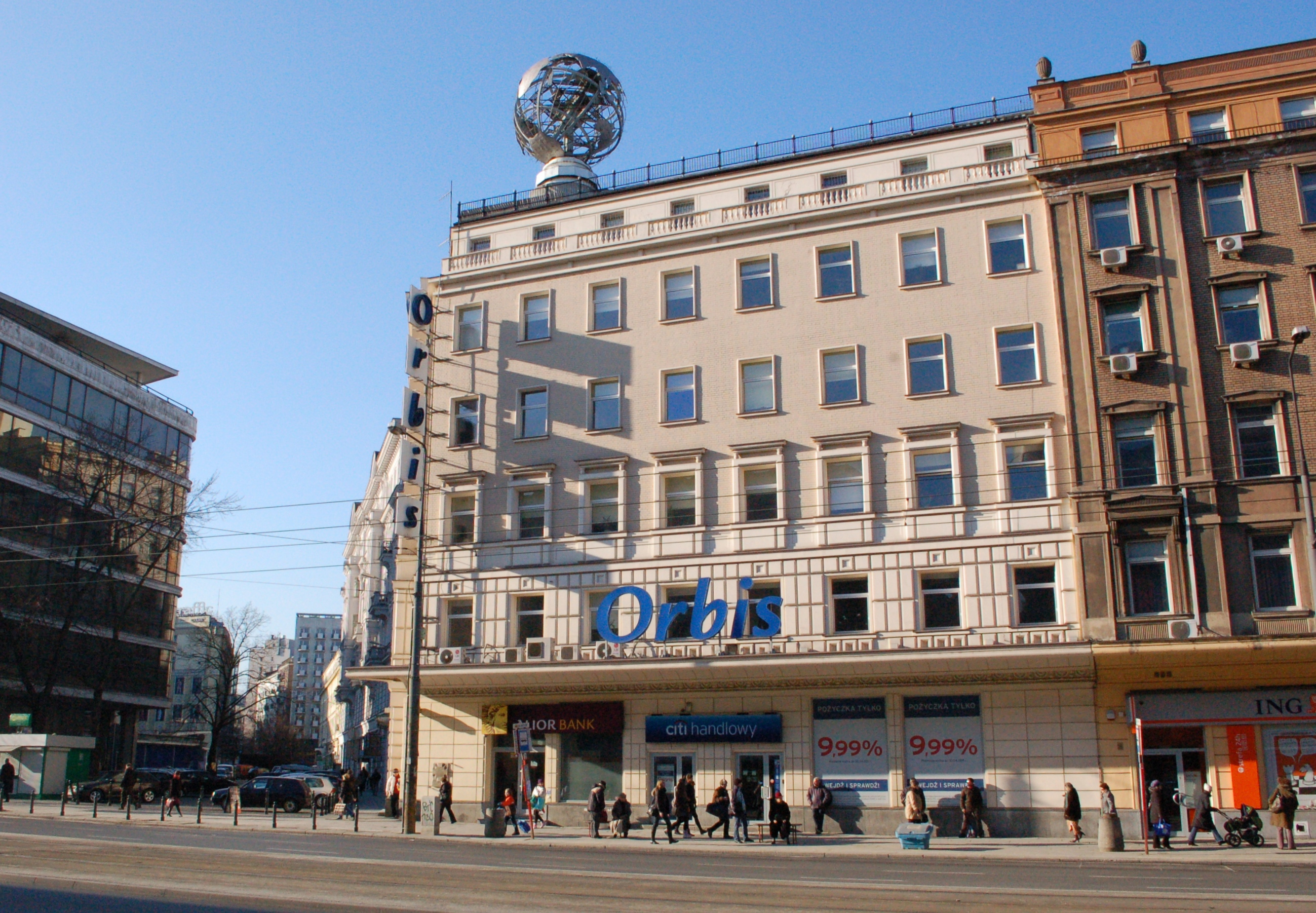
- Orbis headquarters in Warsaw with the symbolic globe at the top
- Industry: Tourism
- Founded: 1920; 106 years ago
- Headquarters: Warsaw, Poland
- Website: www.orbis.pl

Orbis is the oldest travel agency in Poland, founded in 1920 in Lwów (now: Lviv, Ukraine). Currently, it is the largest hotel group in Poland and Central Europe, and parent company of Orbis S.A. Capital Group, which has nine subsidiaries. Its name comes from a Latin language word Orbis, which means world.

== History ==
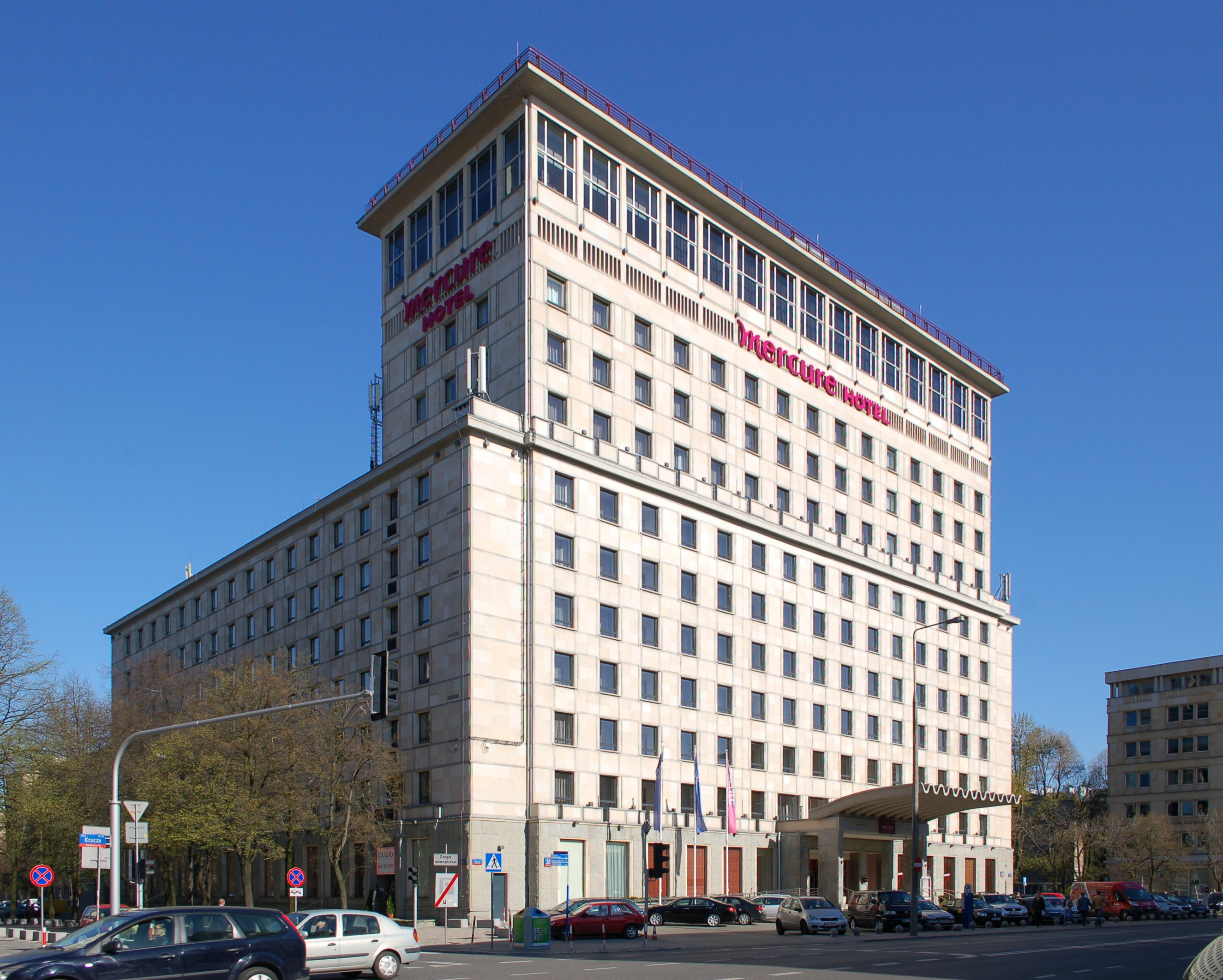
The Grand Hotel in Warsaw, built after the war and operated by Orbis, now Accor

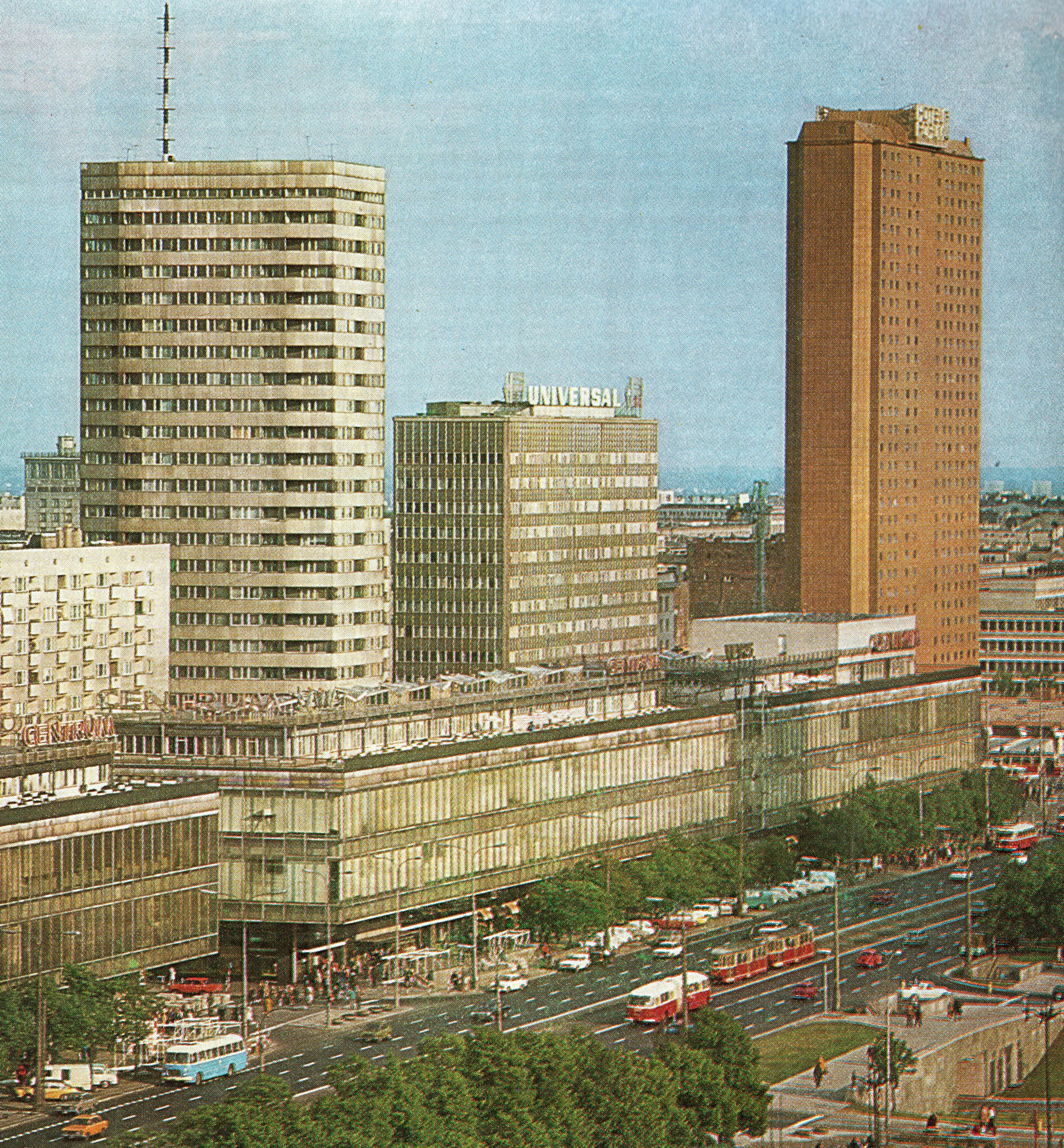
Hotel Forum in Warsaw (on the right), built in 1974 and operated by Orbis, now Accor

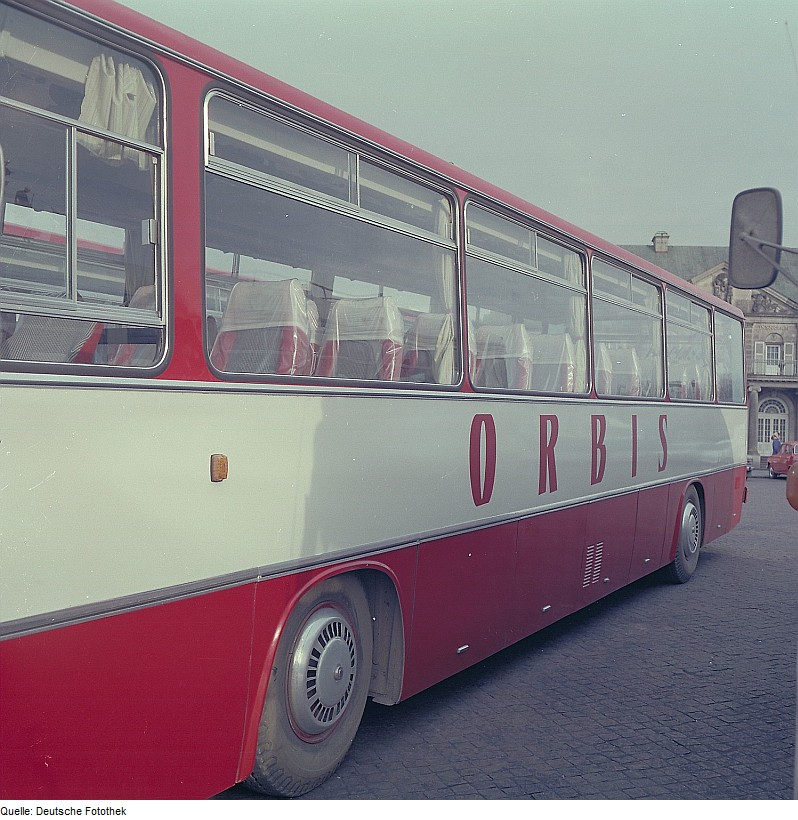
Orbis bus in 1972

Polish Travel Office was opened in 1920 in Lwow, and among its founders are bankers Ernest Adam, Maksymilian Liptay and Józef Radoszewski, as well as politician Wladyslaw Keslowicz, Count Aleksander Skarbek, and lawyer Ozjasz Wasser. Their target was to create a travel office with international standards of service, which would provide services for the citizens of the newly created Second Polish Republic. Orbis quickly developed, and by the year 1925 it had as many as 28 offices. In 1928 it was granted the status of a national travel agency, and in 1933, after its shares had been purchased by PKO Bank Polski, main office was moved to Warsaw. Orbis continued to prosper, by 1939 it had 136 offices in Poland and 19 abroad. It employed app. 500 travel agents, and had four hotels with 360 rooms.

The office ceased its operations during World War II, during which most of its property was looted or destroyed. After the war, the only foreign offices still operating were those in Brussels, New York City, Tel Aviv, and London. Orbis was reopened on December 13, 1944, in Lublin. In Communist Poland it was a state-owned enterprise, and in the late 1940s, it was mostly involved in inter-city bus services as well as mass meetings.

From the 1950s, Orbis took control over a network of pensions, with 5,000 beds. Furthermore, Orbis serviced sleeping and restaurant train cars. In 1951, nine top Polish hotels joined the agency. They were regarded as high-standard hotels, and enjoyed monopoly on both foreign and Polonia visitors.

After the Polish thaw of 1956, Orbis returned to the international market. It organized foreign visits for Polish tourists, mostly to Eastern Bloc countries. Among the most popular locations, were Bulgarian resorts on the Black Sea coast, Lake Balaton in Hungary, and the Yugoslavian coast on the Adriatic Sea. Furthermore, Orbis offered cruises on the TSS Stefan Batory and rented Soviet ships. In 1979, some 1,5 million people were served by Orbis.

In the 1960s and the 1970s, as many as 34 new hotels were built by Orbis. Among them were two properties in Warsaw managed by the American Inter-Continental Hotels chain, the Hotel Forum (built in 1972 - 74; now Novotel Warszawa Centrum), and the Hotel Victoria Inter-Continental (built in 1974 - 76; now Sofitel Victoria Warszawa). In 1980, the company had 555 buses and 373 other vehicles, and it owned 60% of all hotel beds in Poland. The hotels were occupied with half the visitors being foreign, who paid with hard currency. In 1990, Orbis managed 53 hotels, and in 1991, the enterprise was changed into the so-called sole-shareholder company of the State Treasury. In July 1993, Orbis was divided into two companies, Orbis Travel and Orbis Transport, and on November 15, 1997, Orbis SA shares appeared at Warsaw Stock Exchange. By 1999, shares of State Treasury fell below the level of 50%.

In August 2000, French hotel group Accor bought a 20% stake in Orbis. In 2008, they increased their stake to over 50%. In 2019, by which point Accor owned an 85.5% stake in Orbis, the hotel management and services company Accor sold its entire interest in the company to its sister company, AccorInvest, which controls the company's real estate assets.

Together with Orbis Transport and Hekon-Hotele Ekonomiczne, Orbis Group makes up the largest tourist and hotel agency of both Poland and East-Central Europe. It operates 139 hotels with more than 22,200 rooms. Hotels of Orbis Group are operated under such names as Sofitel, Pullman, MGallery, Novotel, Mercure and 3 types of Ibis.

In Poland, Orbis Group operates 3 Sofitel hotels, 2 MGallery hotels, 13 Novotel hotels, 22 Mercure hotels, 37 Ibis hotels (3 types).

== See also ==
- Tourism in Poland
