= Spektrum Tower =

Skyscraper in Warsaw, Poland

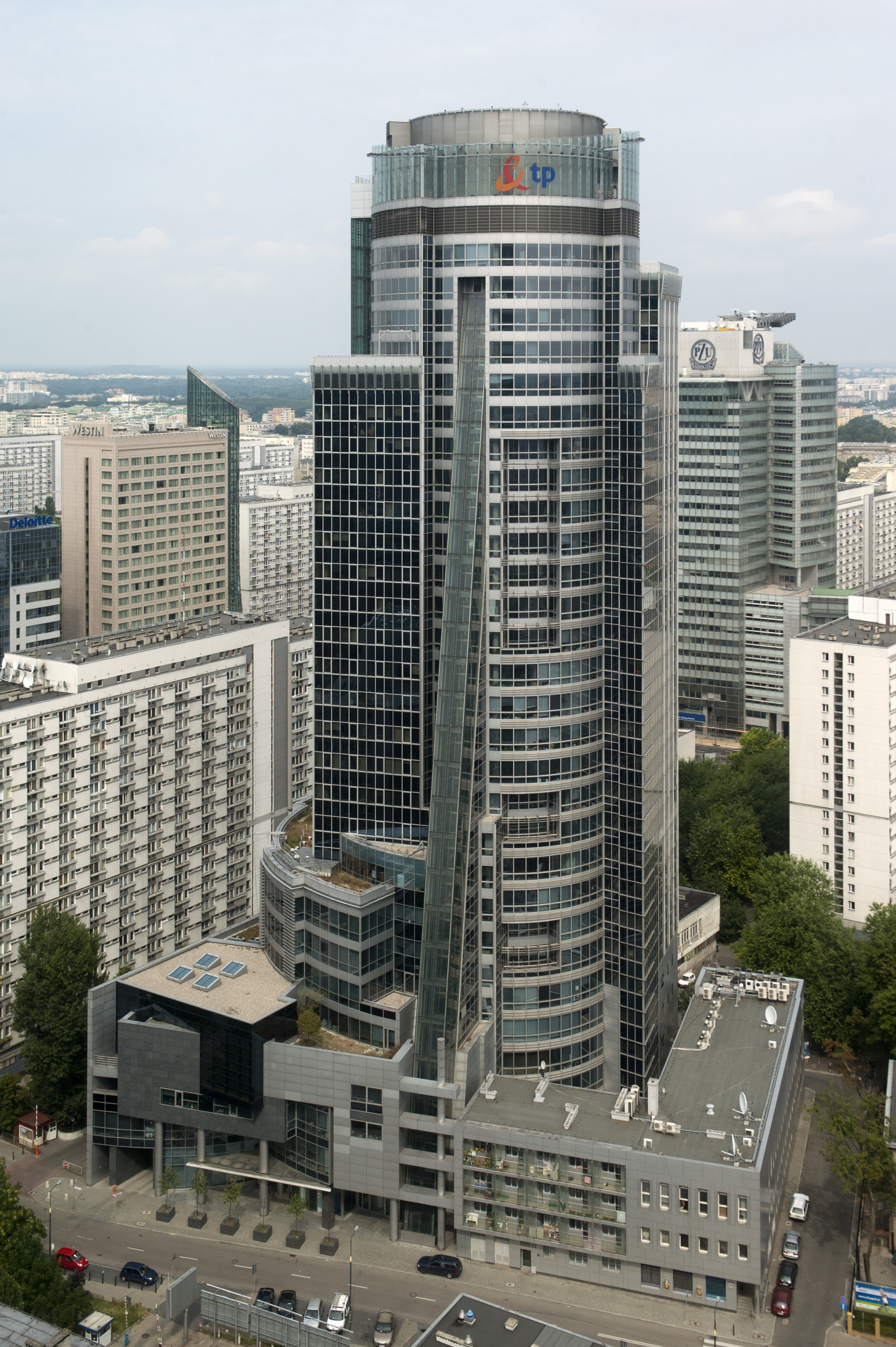
- Spektrum Tower

- Location within Poland
- Former names: TP S.A. Tower

General information
- Location: Twarda 18, Warsaw, Poland
- Coordinates: 52.2344°N 20.9991°E
- Completed: December 2003
- Cost: over PLN 200 million
- Client: Telekomunikacja Polska
- Owner: Europa Capital
- Landlord: Colliers International

Height
- Height: 122 m (400 ft)

Technical details
- Floor count: 30+5
- Floor area: 28000 sqm

Design and construction
- Architects: Apar-Projekt / Arca A&C / TMJ Tomasz Ziętała

Website
- spektrumtower.com

The Spektrum Tower (formerly TP S.A. Tower) is a highrise office tower in Warsaw, the capital of Poland. It is located at 14/16 Twarda Street in the Warszawa-Śródmieście central business district of the city and used to house the headquarters of its investor, the telecom operator Telekomunikacja Polska S.A. (TP S.A.), with some space being leased to other companies.

The building of the tower was initially contracted to PIA Piasecki S.A. on 1 August 1997, originally due to be completed 30 June 2002. In 2002, however, the contractor was found unable to complete the structure due to strained financial standing, and the investor turned to PORR Polska S.A. (who has completed a number of other office buildings and towers in Warsaw) to finish the construction. The Tower was finally completed in December 2003. The Tower was built using the "top-down" technology, with both the over- and underground parts of the structure being constructed simultaneously. During the excavation for the foundation of the Tower, a 580 kg artillery shell from World War II was discovered 8 metres below ground level.

The Tower was designed by architects from Apar-Projekt and Arca A&C bureaus, and consists of a composition of cylinders and cuboids. The structural design was the responsibility of TMJ Tomasz Ziętała. The Tower has 30 overground and 5 underground floors, extending 16.5 metres below ground level and rising to 128 metres above ground. The building comprises almost 50,000 m^{2} of space, over 41,000 of which is usable.

Unique features of the building include the helipad on the roof and the external elevator shaft, sloped 14°, which connects the street level with one of the higher office floors with an elevator cabin travelling at 2.5 m/s. Apart from it, there are seven other straight-up elevator shafts in the building core. The Tower is a modern intelligent building, fitted with building automation systems.

In July 2008 it was sold to Danish investment fund Baltic Property Trust Optima which sold it in 2012 to a London-based Europa Capital LLP fund

== See also ==
- List of tallest buildings in Poland
