= Q22 (building) =

Skyscraper in Warsaw, Poland

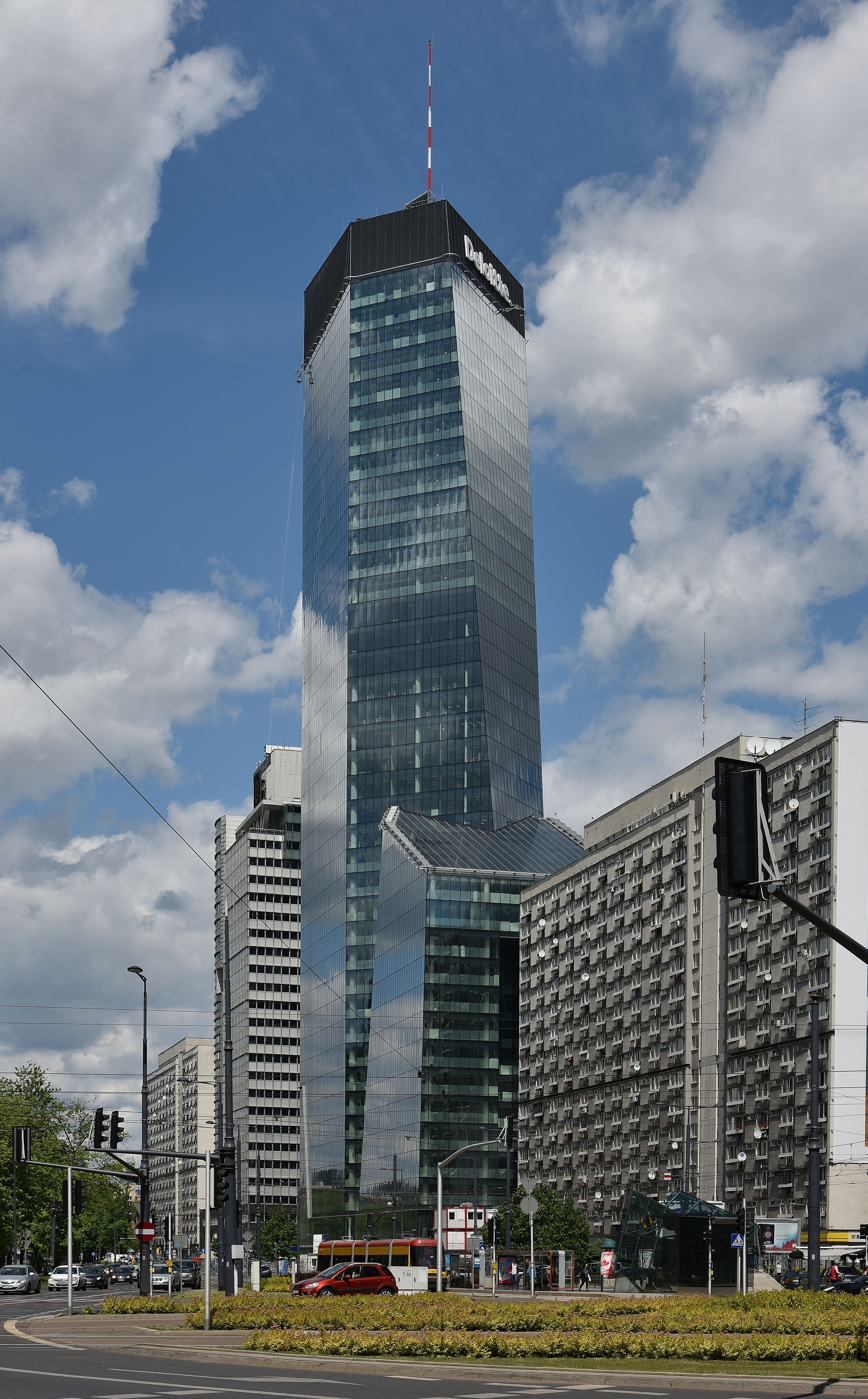
- Construction site in June 2016
- Interactive map of the Q22 area

General information
- Status: Completed
- Type: Office
- Architectural style: Neomodern
- Location: Warsaw, Poland, Jana Pawła II 22
- Coordinates: 52°14′08″N 20°59′53″E
- Construction started: June 2013
- Completed: July 2016
- Cost: 500,000,000 PLN
- Owner: Invesco Real Estate

Height
- Antenna spire: 195 m (640 ft)
- Roof: 159 m (522 ft)

Technical details
- Floor count: 42+5
- Floor area: 91,164 m^{2} (981,280 sq ft)

Design and construction
- Architects: APA Kuryłowicz & Associates, Buro Happold Polska
- Developer: Echo Investment

Other information
- Parking: 348 cars

Website
- q22.com.pl

Q22 is a neomodern office skyscraper in Warsaw, Poland. The project was developed by the Polish real estate developer Echo Investment and designed by APA Kuryłowicz & Associates with collaboration of Buro Happold Polska. The building is 159 metres (522 ft) high and has 50,000 m^{2} (540,000 sq ft) rentable office space. It replaces the Mercure Fryderyk Chopin hotel that occupied this site between 1991 and 2012.

Construction started in June 2013 and cleared the ground in October 2014. The building was opened in October 2016.

Deloitte chose this building in late 2014 as its Polish headquarters.

In 2023, Q22 became the first office building in the European Union to enable tenants and employees to access their corporate space with an employee badge using their Apple Wallet.

In May 2023, Q22 was awarded a SmartScore certification for its technological improvements.

== See also ==
- List of tallest buildings in Poland
