= Orbiting Binary Black Hole Investigation Satellite =

Planned X-ray space telescope

Orbiting Binary Black Hole Investigation Satellite (ORBIS)
- Mission type: Astrophysics
- Operator: Tokyo Metropolitan University
- Website: www.comp.sd.tmu.ac.jp/ssl/orbis/Top.html
- Mission duration: 1.5 years (planned)

Spacecraft properties
- Spacecraft type: microsatellite
- Launch mass: 46 kg
- Dimensions: 46 ×46 ×44 cm
- Power: 78 W (solar panels)

Start of mission
- Launch date: ?

Orbital parameters
- Regime: Low Earth orbit
- Periapsis altitude: 550 km
- Apoapsis altitude: 550 km
- Inclination: 3°
- Period: 96 min
- Epoch: planned

Main X-ray astronomy
- Focal length: 20 cm (7.9 in)
- Wavelengths: X-ray

Transponders
- Band: S band

Orbiting Binary Black Hole Investigation Satellite (ORBIS) is a small space telescope still in development by Japan that will study binary black holes in the X-ray region.

The ORBIS concept won the first prize at the 18th Satellite Design Contest in 2010, and of 2015 it was on preliminary design and undergoing thermal simulations by the Tokyo Metropolitan University with support from Japan Aerospace Exploration Agency (JAXA) and the Institute of Space and Astronautical Science (ISAS).

The spacecraft will have a mass of about 46 kg and it features a propulsion system using 60 wt% hydrogen peroxide. Launch was aimed for 2020.

== Scientific objectives ==
Binary black holes (BBHs) are believed to be formed during the merger and growth of galaxies. Although several binary black hole candidates have been identified, they have yet to be verified by long-term observations. In order to ascertain that an object is a BBH, periodical luminosity change in X-ray wavelength must be detected. However, continuous observation of BBHs by large X-ray telescopes is difficult as such spacecraft are used by many groups and have numerous observation targets. Since microsatellites have comparatively low-cost, flexibility, and can fly more often than large spacecraft, they can conduct unique studies where risks are associated. As ORBIS is dedicated to study BBHs, it can conduct continuous observation of such bodies. The scientific goals of the microsatellite is to uncover the growth process of black holes and galaxies, and to and contribute to gravitational-wave astronomy.

Some simulations have concluded that after crossing a certain distance, the energy dissipation of two approaching black holes ceases, result in them not getting closer any further. However, the merger of black holes is expected to occur during the collision of galaxies. This unsolved problem is known as the final parsec problem. By finding and studying black holes less than 1 pc apart, ORBIS aims to resolve this issue.

Computer simulation of a binary black hole system
