= Forest (skyscraper) =

Skyscraper office building in Warsaw, Poland

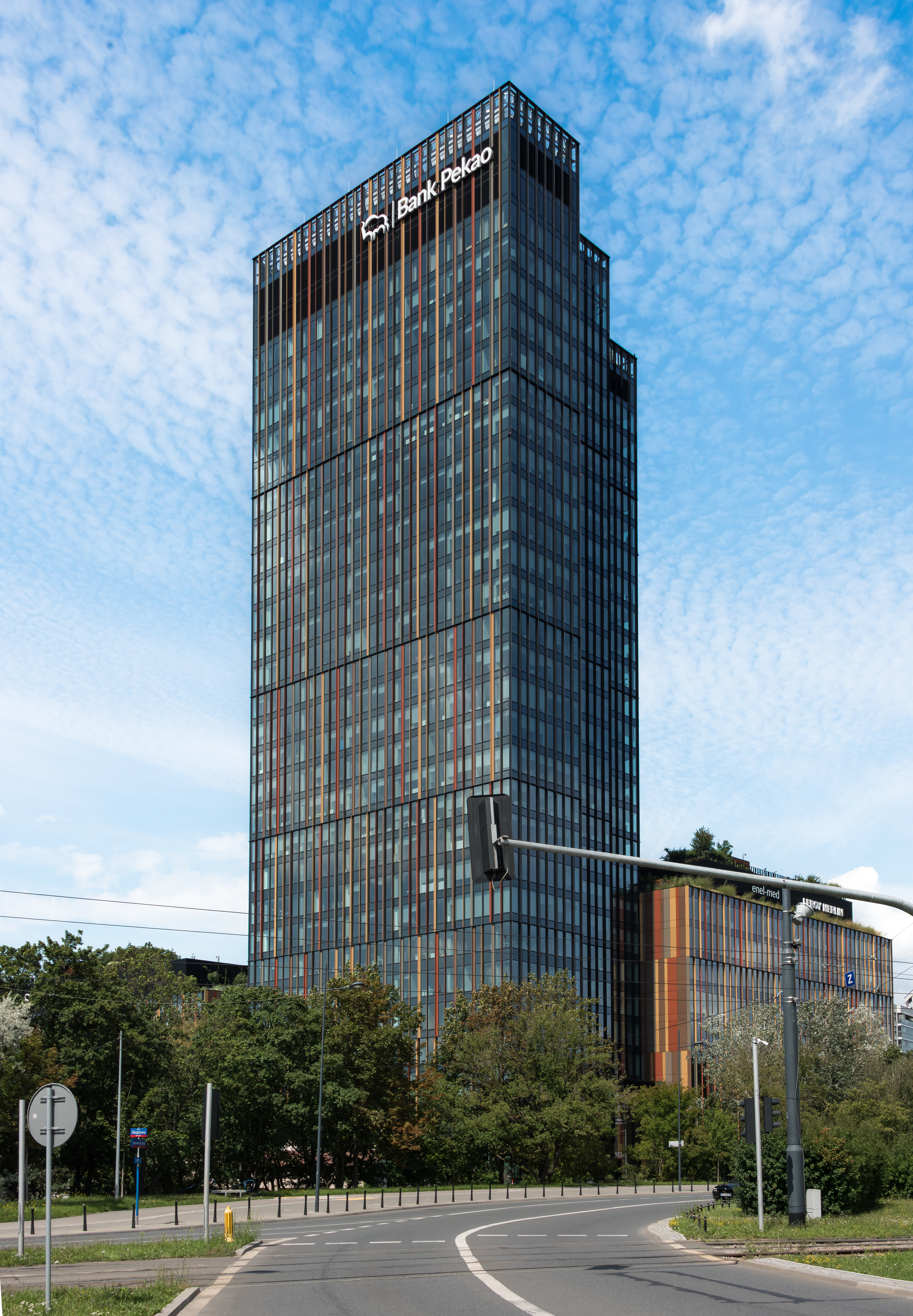
- The building in 2026.
- Interactive map of the Forest area

General information
- Type: Office skyscraper
- Location: Wola, Warsaw, Poland, 14 Burakowska Street
- Coordinates: 52°15′14.39″N 20°58′56.50″E
- Construction started: June 2019
- Completed: 28 March 2022
- Cost: 162 million euros
- Owner: HB Reavis

Height
- Architectural: 120 m
- Tip: 120 m
- Roof: 120 m

Technical details
- Floor count: 29
- Floor area: 78,990 m²

Design and construction
- Architecture firm: HRA Architekci
- Developer: HB Reavis

The Forest is a complex of office buildings, including a 120-metre-tall skycsraper, in Warsaw, Poland. It is located at 14 Burakowska Street in the neighbourhood of Powązki, within the district of Wola. It was opened in 2022.

== History ==
The building complex was an investment of Slovakia-based company HB Reavis, costing 162 million euros. It was designed by architects firm HRA Architekci, and constructed between June 2019 and 28 March 2022. It received the certifications BREEAM and WELL Core & Shell, confirming sustainability of its design. It was also given the Mayor of Warsaw Architecture Award for the best commercial building in the city of 2022. In 2023, it became headquarters to the Bank Pekao.

== Characteristics ==
The campus includes a 120-metre-tall skyscraper Forest with 29 storeys, surrounded by several 6- and 8-storey-tall buildings. In total they offer a 78,990 m² floor area, of which 71,000 m² is for office spaces, and 5,000 m² for stores and services. Around them is a two-hectare site with a lawn, a small forested area with 200 trees, and an artificial pond.
