= Novotel Warszawa Centrum =

Skyscraper hotel in Warsaw, Poland

Coordinates: 52.2294°N 21.0136°E

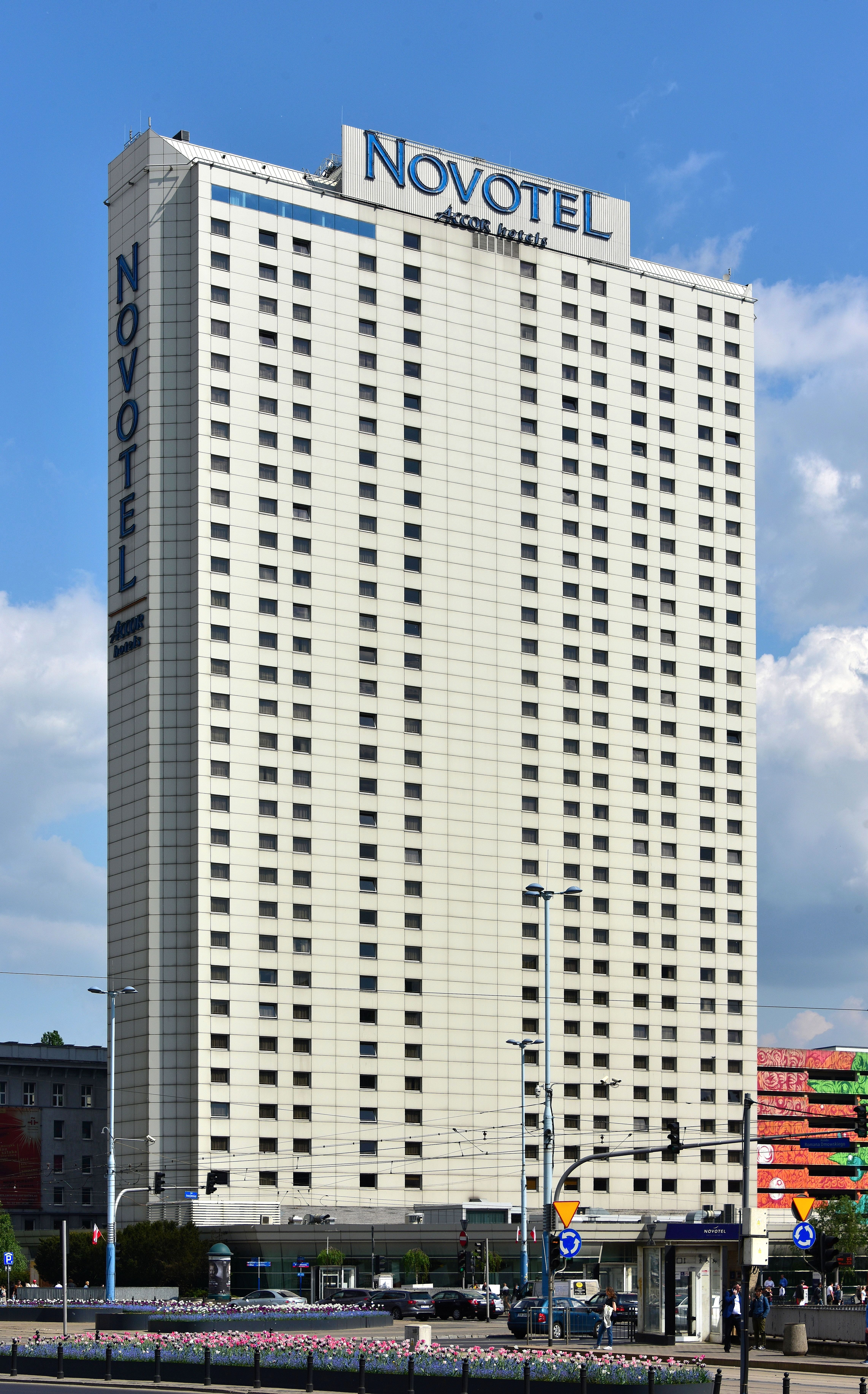
- Interactive map of the Novotel Warszawa Centrum area
- Former names: Hotel Forum

General information
- Location: Warsaw, Poland, ul. Marszałkowska 94/98
- Construction started: 1972
- Completed: 1974

Height
- Height: 111m

Technical details
- Floor count: 33

Novotel Warszawa Centrum is a 33-story, 111-meter skyscraper hotel in Warsaw, Poland.

== History ==
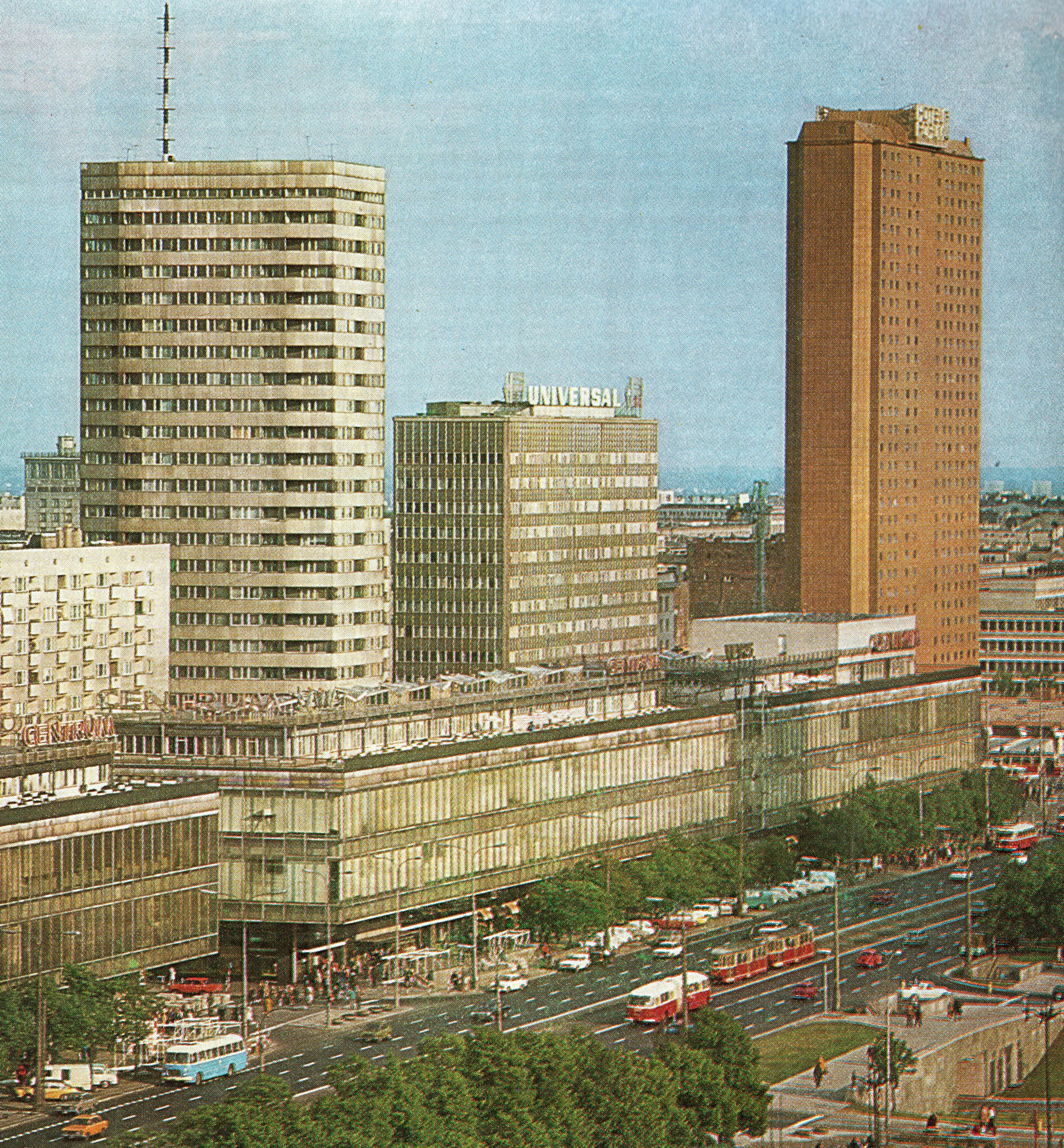
Hotel Orbis Forum, 1975

The Hotel Orbis Forum was built from 1972 to 1974, during Poland's communist era, by the state-owned travel monopoly Orbis. The hotel was designed to accommodate foreign visitors, and was managed by the budget Forum Hotels division of Pan Am's InterContinental Hotels chain. The hotel was designed by Swedish architect Sten Samuelson and erected by Swedish construction company Skånska Cementgjuteriet. It was the second tallest building in Poland after the Stalinist Palace of Culture and Science. The hotel opened on January 25, 1974. The building's flat, rectangular shape, with rows of small windows and a brown facade, earned it the nickname giant chocolate bar.

In 2000, the French Accor group bought a 20% stake in Orbis. The hotel was transferred to Accor's Novotel division in 2002 and renamed Novotel Warszawa Centrum. Between 2004 and 2005, the building underwent extensive modernization, with its brown facade repainted gray.

== See also ==
- List of tallest buildings in Poland
