= Złota 44 =

Skyscraper in Warsaw, Poland

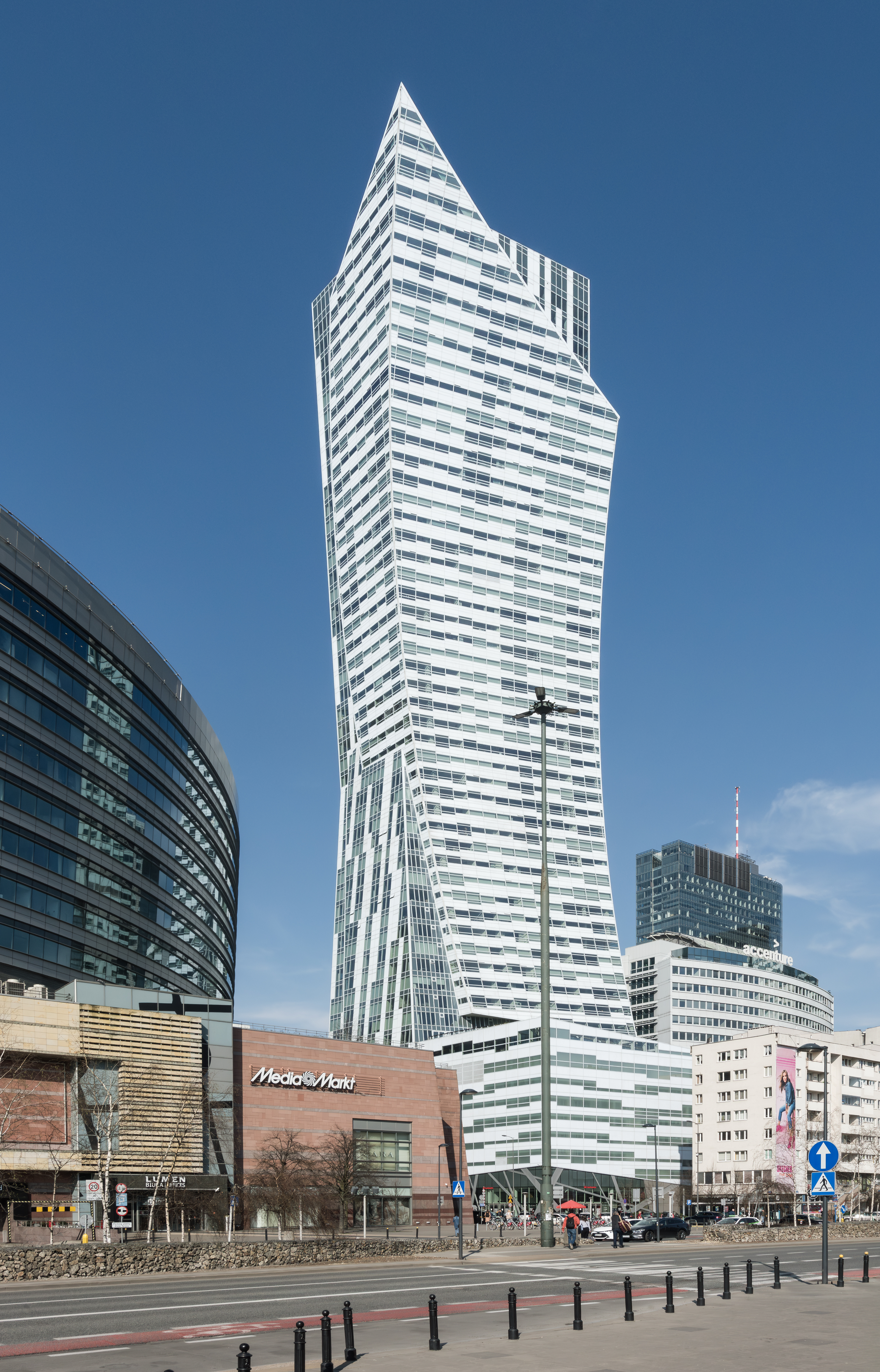
- View from Emilia Plater Street
- Interactive map of the Złota 44 area

General information
- Status: Completed
- Type: Residential
- Architectural style: Deconstructivism
- Location: Śródmieście, Warsaw, Poland, Złota 44
- Coordinates: 52°13′52″N 21°00′09″E
- Construction started: 2007
- Completed: 2016

Height
- Height: 192 m (630 ft)

Technical details
- Floor count: 52
- Floor area: 79,000 m^{2} (850,000 sq ft)

Design and construction
- Architect: Daniel Libeskind
- Developer: Amstar – BBI Development

Other information
- Number of suites: 266

Website
- zlota44.com

Złota 44 is a residential skyscraper (192 meters high, 52 stories) in central Warsaw, Poland. It was designed by Polish-American architect Daniel Libeskind, in association with Polish architects Artchitecture. It was developed by US real estate investment manager Amstar and Warsaw developer BBI Development, which bought the topped-out but unfinished building from its initial developer, ORCO. The building is sometimes referred to as Żagiel (meaning "sail" in Polish) although the skyscraper's architect drew inspiration for Złota 44 from the shape of an eagle's wing symbolizing changing Warsaw, Poland and freedom.

== Design ==
The building's name comes from its address on Złota ("Golden") Street. Złota 44 is located next to Varso Tower, the tallest building in the European Union (310 m), the Palace of Culture and Science, the second tallest building in Poland (237 m), and the Złote Tarasy shopping center. At 192 meters, Złota 44 is one of the tallest residential buildings in Poland and the European Union. The luxury 52-story skyscraper contains 287 apartments. All of these are equipped with the home management system (HMS), facilitating control of the air conditioning, roller blinds, heating, illumination, and allowing online restaurant orders and other services. All residents receive a security card, which only allows them to reach the floor their apartment is located on.

Residents have access to a wine cellar which accommodates up to 10,000 bottles and includes a tasting room. In addition to a 25-meter swimming pool (the largest private pool in Poland), the recreational floor has a hot tub, massage rooms, a Finnish sauna, a steam room and outdoor terrace. The floor also features a private movie theater with a golf simulator, children's playroom and conference rooms. A dedicated concierge is at the disposal of residents.

== Apartments ==
The apartments are located between the 9th and 52nd floors. Fully finished apartments were offered in nine interior design variants and four sizes: one-bedroom units (from 62 to 70 square meters), medium-sized units (90 to 120 square meters), larger apartments (140 to 250 square meters) and penthouses (which may exceed 1000 square meters, possibly encompassing the entire floor).

On 16 April 2015, the sale of apartments officially resumed. Depending on location, size, layout and finishing standard, the price per square meter ranged from 24,000 to 40,000 PLN.

== History ==
Due to financial problems experienced by the developer, as well as invalidation of the construction permit and disputes with the inhabitants of the surrounding buildings, Złota 44's construction was put on hold in 2009, but resumed in January 2011. On 3 February 2012, the building was topped out.

In December 2013, ORCO terminated its contract with general construction contractor Inso. By the end of the year, ORCO was calling the investment a "major financial failure for the group in the fall of 2013". It announced a €121 million (approximately 500 million PLN) write-down of the value of the building, and went on to announce its intention to sell it as quickly as possible. One of the banks financing the skyscraper's construction terminated its contract and wanted its 250 million PLN loan refunded. ORCO also disclosed that the high apartment prices (up to 65,000 PLN per square meter, at the time the highest in Poland) were artificially inflated to generate media coverage.

On 28 August 2014, ORCO's sale of Złota 44 was finalized; the skyscraper was acquired by American real estate investment company Amstar and Polish property developer BBI Development for €50 million (approximately 215 million PLN), a fraction of the estimated €163 million (700 million PLN) construction cost.

=== Apartment 504 ===
In January 2024, IT entrepreneur Rafał Zaorski announced he would resell Apartment 504, which he bought in 2022 for PLN 22.9 million making it "the most expensive single-story apartment sold in Poland". The interested parties included Elon Musk, who wanted to open an office there. However, the apartment could only serve residential purposes and running an office there was not possible. Zaorski came up with a new idea that would see up to 20,000 "keys" to the apartment sold for the equivalent of PLN 5,000 a piece describing it as the "largest real estate experiment in the world" and an "interesting social experiment". In return, buyers would be given access to the flat and its assorted amenities, as well as an official entry in the land and mortgage registry. The scheme would net the entrepreneur 100 million złoty if it was successful. The plan was eventually blocked by the Złota 44 housing community. In October 2024, the apartment was sold to an anonymous buyer for an undisclosed sum of money. In December 2024, it was revealed that the buyer was a billionaire from Turkey.

== Gallery ==
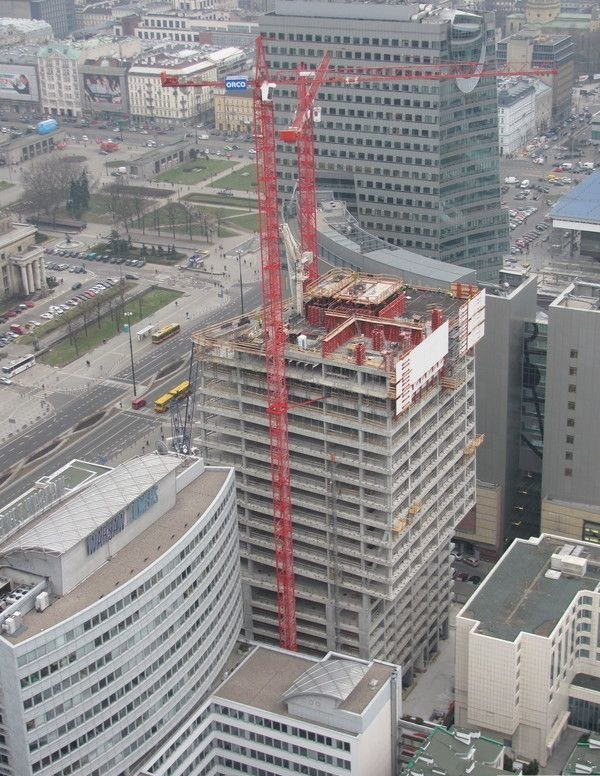
April 2011

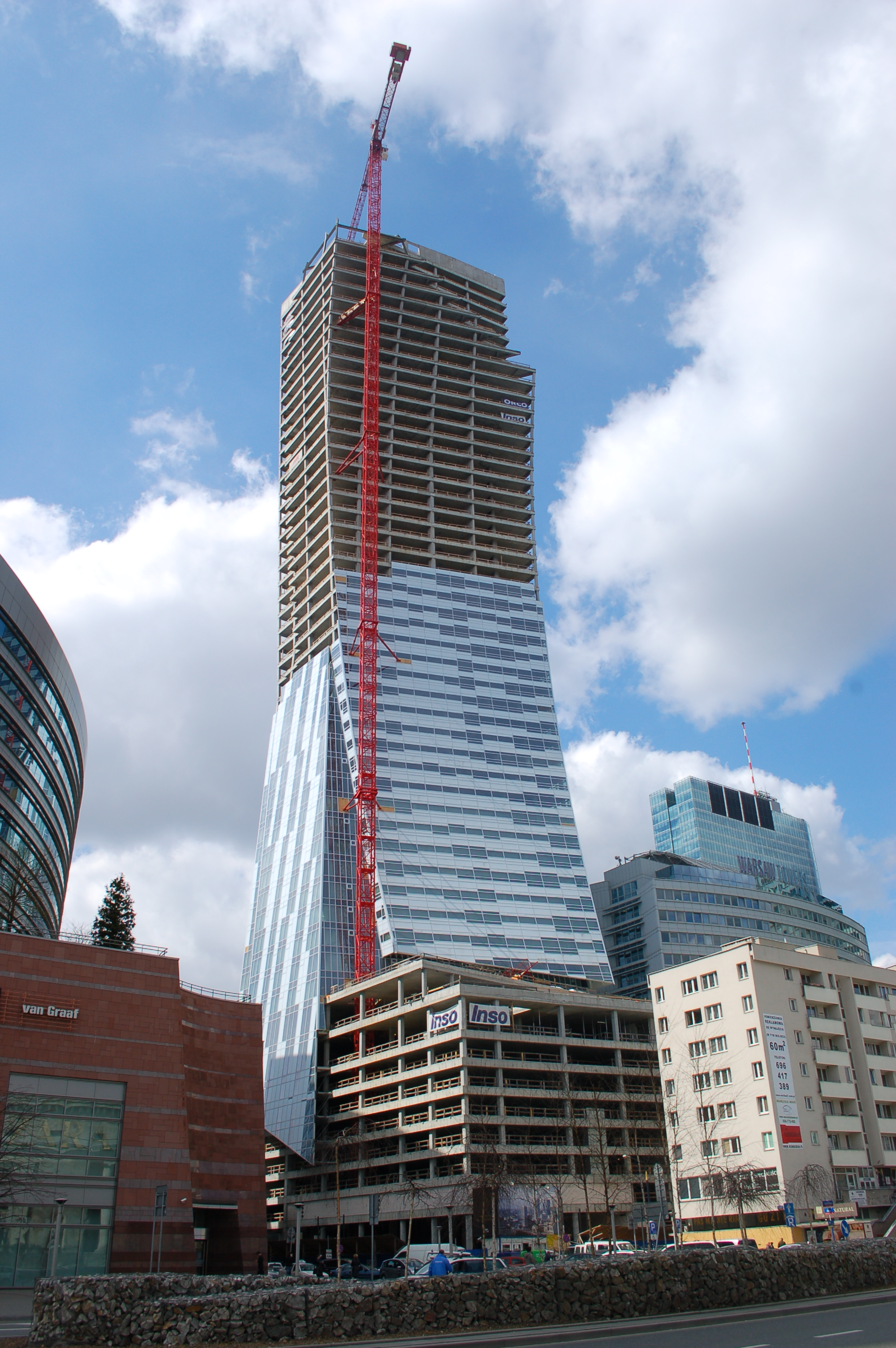
April 2012

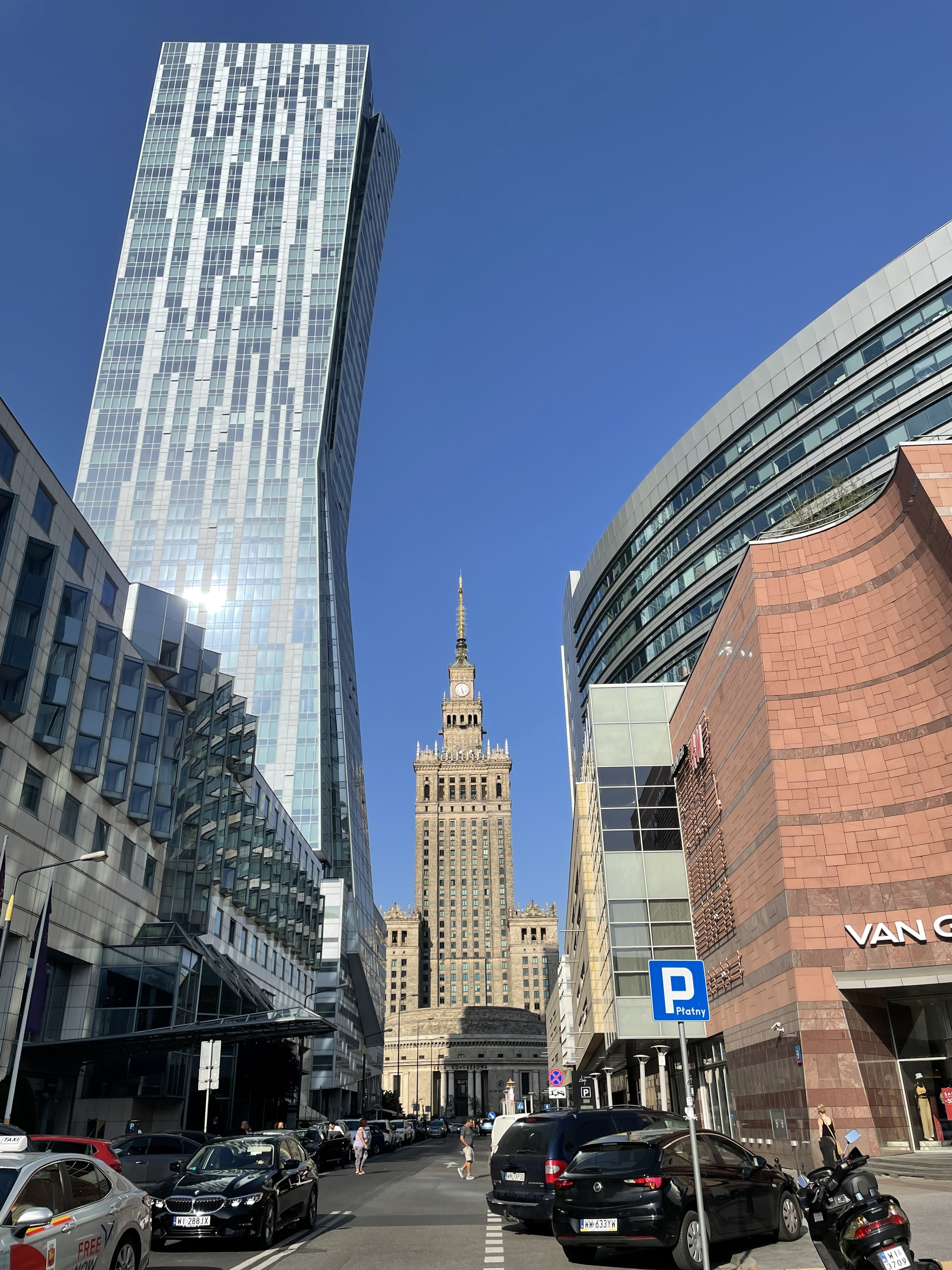
View from the ground

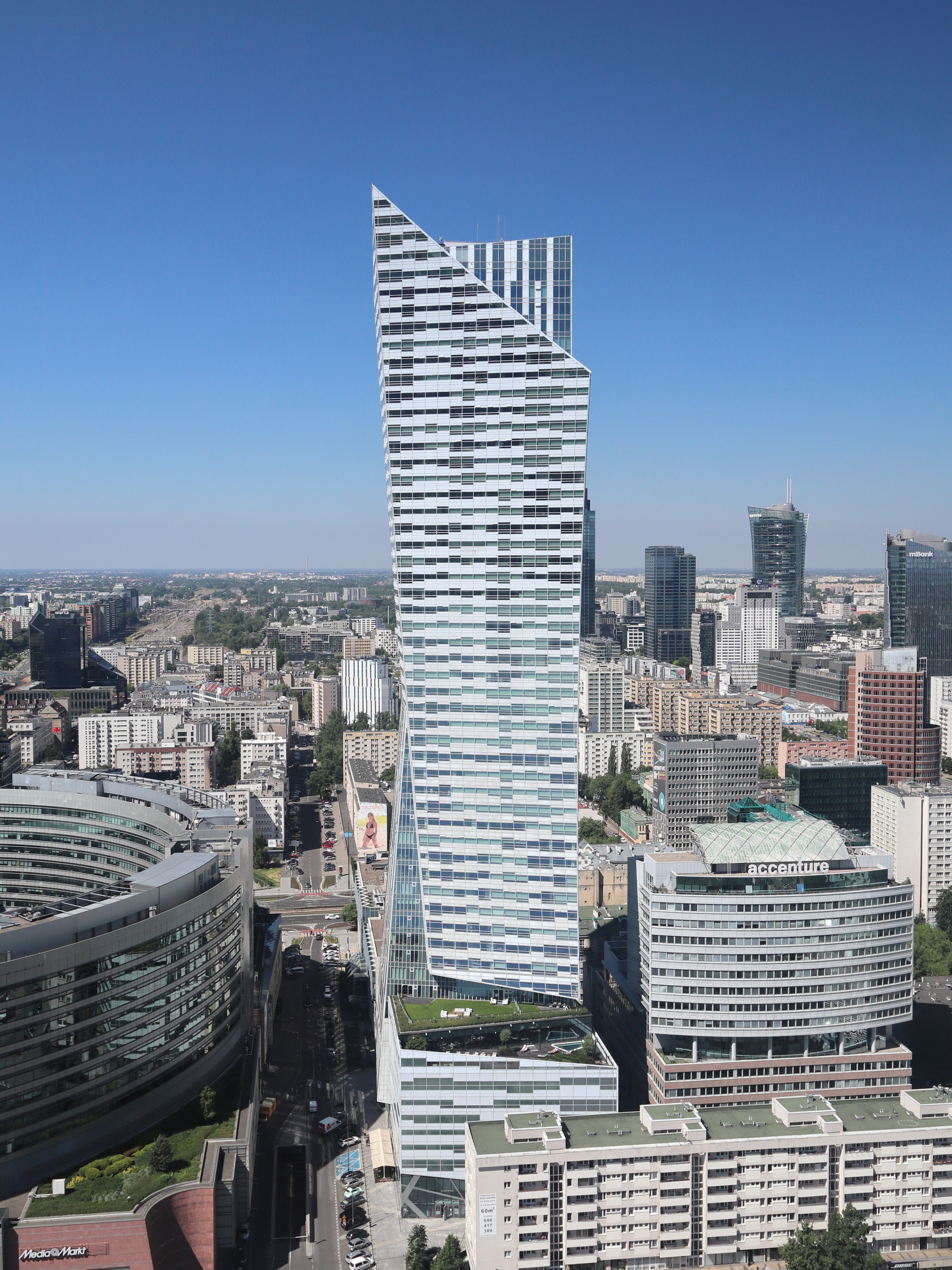
View from the Palace of Culture and Science

== See also ==
- List of tallest buildings in Poland
- List of tallest buildings in Warsaw
- List of tallest buildings in Europe
