= Warsaw Financial Center =

Tall building in Warsaw Poland

Coordinates: 52.2333°N 21.0017°E

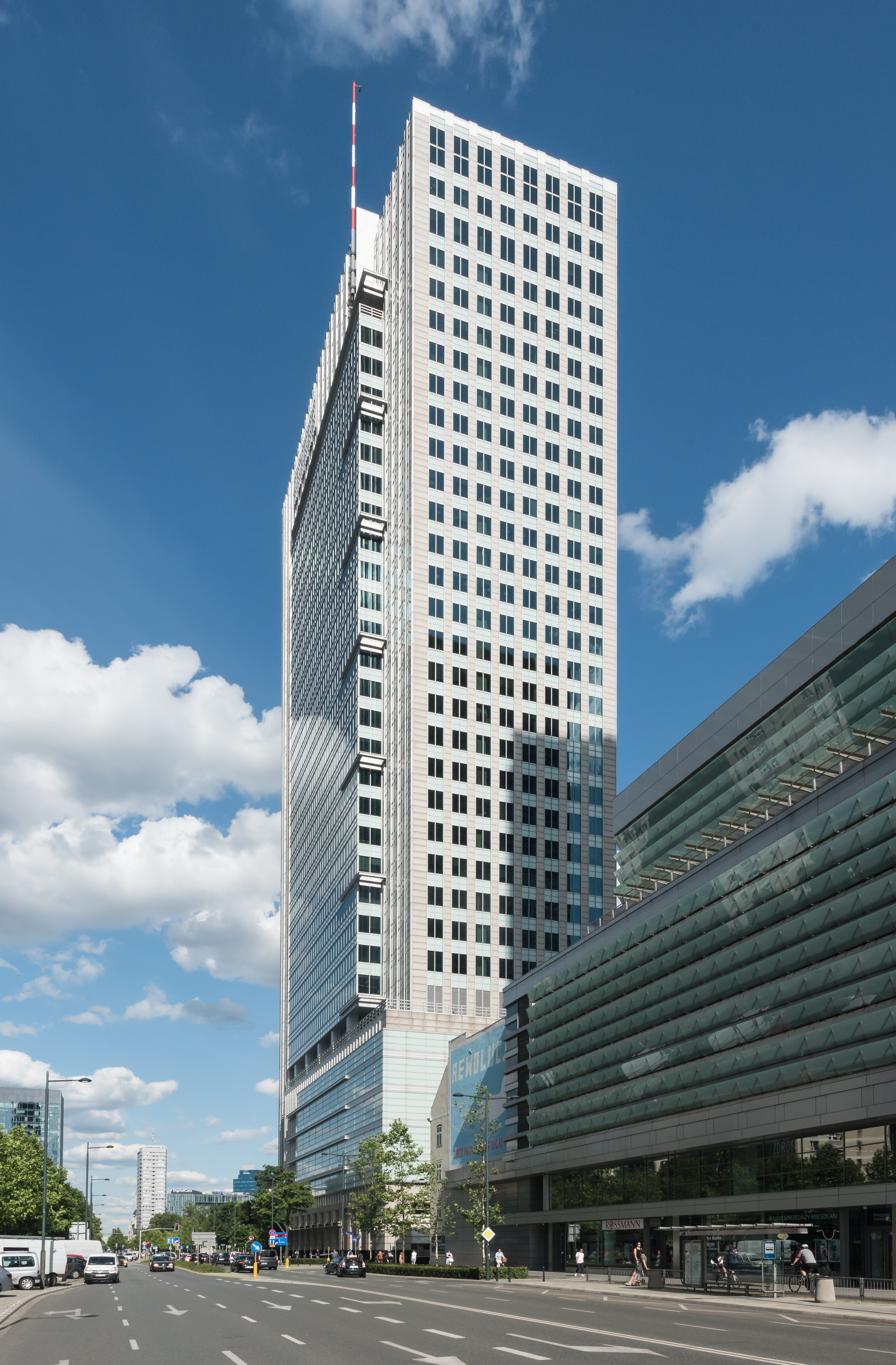
Warsaw Financial Center

Warsaw Financial Center is a skyscraper in Warsaw with a height of 143.9 metres (472 ft) topped with an antenna mast which is nearly 20 metres (66 ft).

== Description ==
The building was constructed to comply with all applicable building codes of the United States, including an emergency generator that provides power for all Life Safety Systems including fire alarm systems, HVAC fire support systems, the building's fire pump, elevators and emergency egress lighting, and its own water tanks (with a capacity of about 600,000 litres (160,000 US gal)) for the production of safe drinking water. Warsaw Financial Center was designed by renowned U.S. architecture firms, A. Epstein & Sons International and Kohn Pedersen Fox Associates, in cooperation with Polish architects, who were inspired by the 333 Wacker Drive building in Chicago.

The building has a six floor parking lot for 350 cars. The ground floor houses a Bank Pekao branch and a Starbucks coffee shop. There are floors dedicated to office space that are air-conditioned and equipped with satellite connection and internet. The building incorporates 16 elevators and is fully handicapped-accessible.

The total leasable space in the Warsaw Financial Center amounts to 50,000 square metres. Each floor offers 1,900 m² A+ class office space, 2.75 m tall.

The Warsaw Financial Center was designed by the American skyscraper design studio of A. Epstein & Sons International and Kohn Pedersen Fox Associates, in cooperation with Polish architects. The main contractor for the tower was PORR International AG, who have also built the Warsaw Sheraton and the Stock Exchange building.

Construction lasted from 1997 to 1998.

As of the end of 2012, Warsaw Financial Center is owned by CPI Poland.

== Notable tenants ==
- Google Poland Sp. z o.o.
- G2A PL Sp. z o.o.
- Taipei Representative Office in Poland
- Taiwan External Trade Development Council (Polish branch)

== See also ==
- List of tallest buildings in Poland
