= Władysław Tryliński =

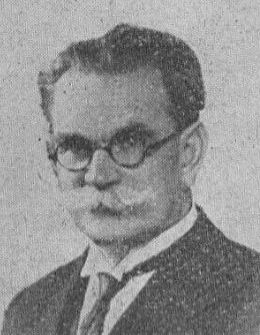
- Tryliński, c. 1930s
- Born: 20 June 1878; Telšiai, Russian Empire
- Died: 6 February 1956 (aged 77); Warsaw, Poland
- Burial place: Powązki Cemetery, Warsaw
- Education: Tsar Alexander I Institute of Transportation Engineers
- Occupations: Transportation engineer; inventor
- Notable work: Invention of trylinka and reinforced concrete railway sleeper; design of the Maurzyce Bridge
- Spouse: Jadvyga Beata Trylińska (née Pieczkowska)
- Children: Władysław Tryliński (mechanical engineer); Beata Trylińska
- Awards: Order of Polonia Restituta (Officer's Cross, 1923) Cross of Merit (Gold, 1939)

Signature
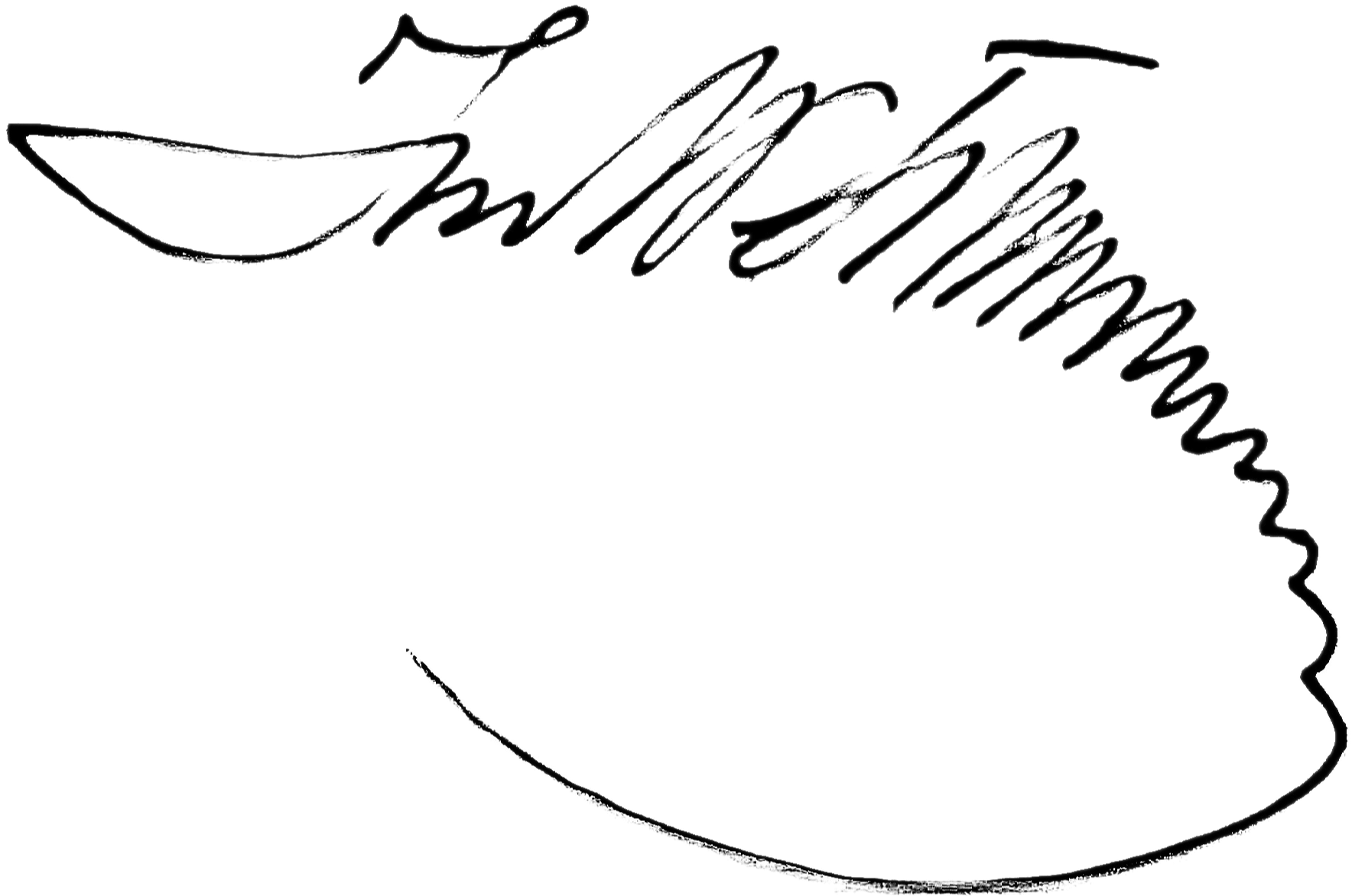

Władysław Tryliński (20 June 1878 – 6 February 1956) was a Polish transportation engineer and inventor. He is best known for the creation of trylinka, the hexagonal concrete block widely used for pavements and embankments in interwar Poland, and the engineering design of the Maurzyce Bridge, the world's first entirely welded road bridge—developed in collaboration with construction engineer Stefan Bryła.

In recognition of his contributions, Tryliński was awarded the Officer's Cross of the Order of Polonia Restituta, Poland's second-highest civilian state award, in 1923, and the Gold Cross of Merit in 1939.

== Early life and education ==
Tryliński was born in Telšiai, then part of the Russian Empire's Kovno Governorate (in present-day Lithuania) to Antoni Tryliński, a military officer from a Pułtusk family, and Agnieszka (née Zawadzka).

After graduating from the Praga Gymnasium in Warsaw in 1896, he studied for a year at the physics and mathematics department of Saint Petersburg University, and in 1902 graduated from the Tsar Alexander I Institute of Transportation Engineers (present-day St. Petersburg State Transport University) in Saint Petersburg, Russia.

== Career ==
After the graduation, Tryliński worked in Yekaterinburg in the design team of the Black Sea Railway. In 1904, he began to work in the Vilnius District of Communication Roads, directing constructions of about 200 road bridges and replacements of wooden bridges and culverts with those made of more durable materials—mostly reinforced concrete.

During the First World War, he directed road works for the army in Chișinău and Pskov with the rank of general from 1915 to 1917. In 1918, he was the head of the technical division of General Józef Dowbor-Muśnicki's I Eastern Corps in Babruysk. After Poland regained its independence in the early 1920s, he became the director of Public Works at the District Directorate of Public Works of the Warsaw Province, and after reorganisation, the head of the communications and construction department at the Warsaw Provincial Office. For his professional and scientific achievements, he was awarded the Officer's Cross of the Order of Polonia Restituta (Polish: Order Odrodzenia Polski, lit. 'Order of Restored Poland'), Poland's second-highest civilian state award, on 31 December 1923.

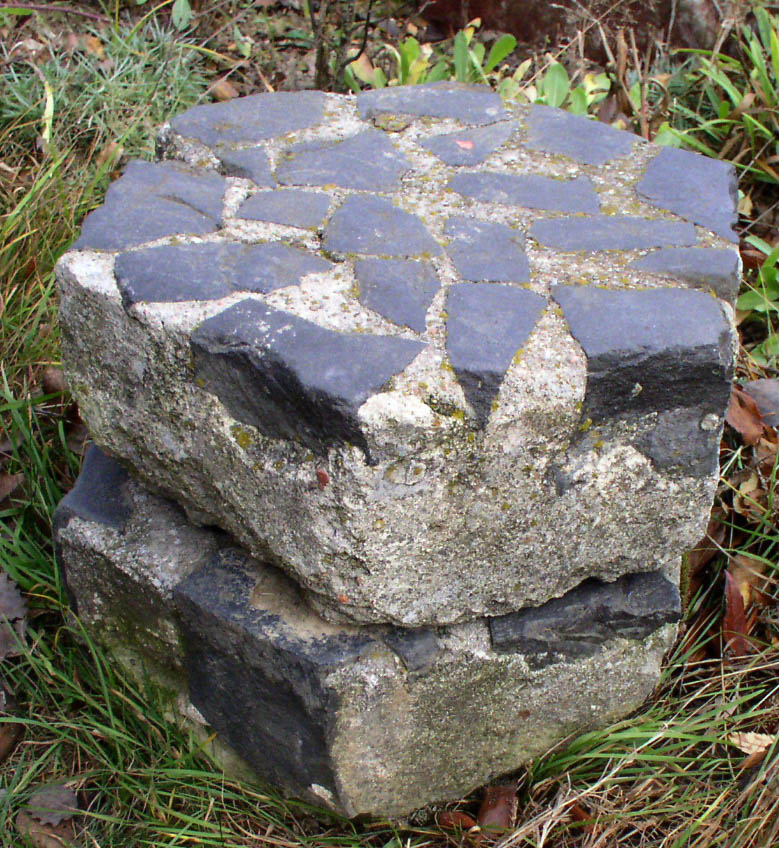
Individual units of trylinka

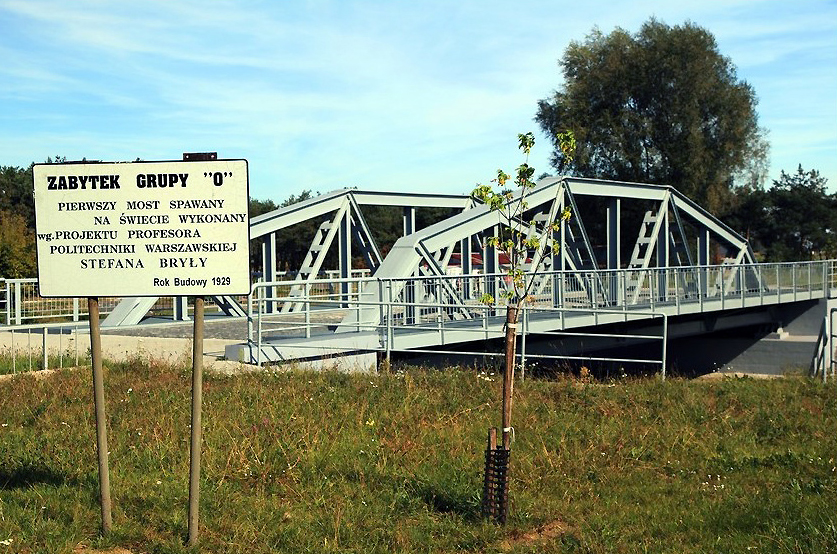
Maurzyce Bridge in 2009

In 1929, together with construction engineer Stefan Bryła, Tryliński gained wide recognition for the engineering design of the Maurzyce Bridge, the world's first entirely welded road bridge, built across the Słudwia River in Maurzyce near Łowicz, Poland. On 24 April 1933, Tryliński received a patent from the Patent Office of the Republic of Poland for "driveways and sidewalks made of hexagonal concrete slabs (Polish: jezdnię drogową i chodniki z płyt betonowych sześciokątnych)". The paving block was named trylinka (pl. trylinki) after him. It was mass-produced and used on an extensive scale in the construction of roads in interwar Poland, owing to its durability, low cost and ease of manufacture—eventually becoming a synonym for the sidewalks paved with them.

From 1925 to 1936, he was president of the Union of Road Engineers. He was awarded the Gold Cross of Merit in 1939 for his service to the state. After the Second World War ended, he began to work at the Ministry of Transportation; his work included evaluating projects for the construction of the East–West Route of Warsaw as well as the reconstruction of the city's railroad junction. From 1951 until his death in 1956, he worked at the Ministry of Road and Air Transport. He received a patent for reinforced concrete railway sleeper on 12 February 1953.

Tryliński died in Warsaw at age 77 and was buried at Powązki Cemetery in Wola district of the city.
