= Trylinka =

Road surface built with hexagonal tiles

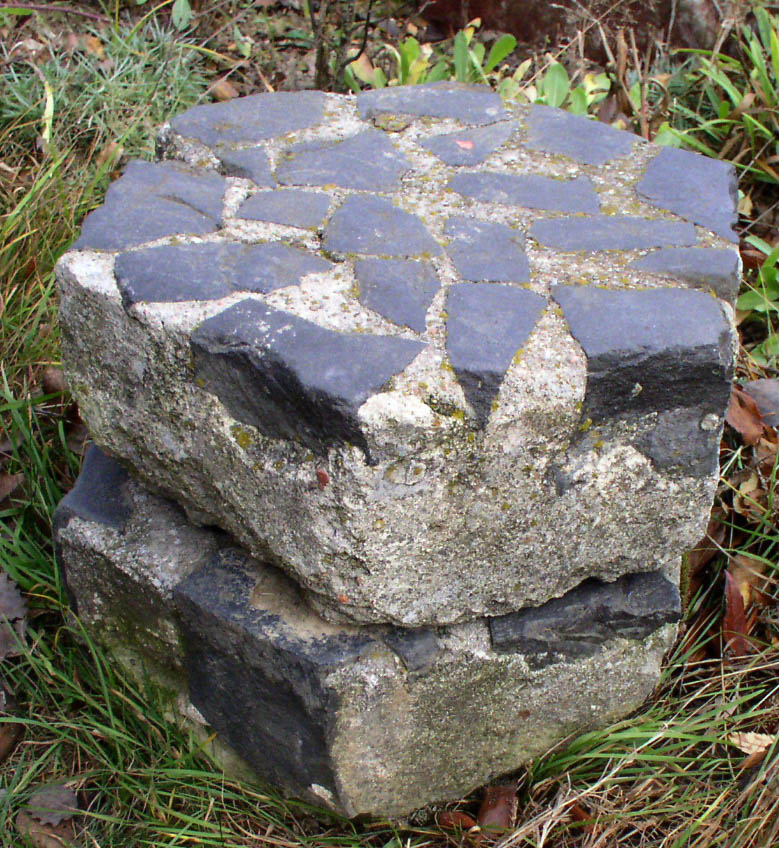
Individual units of trylinka

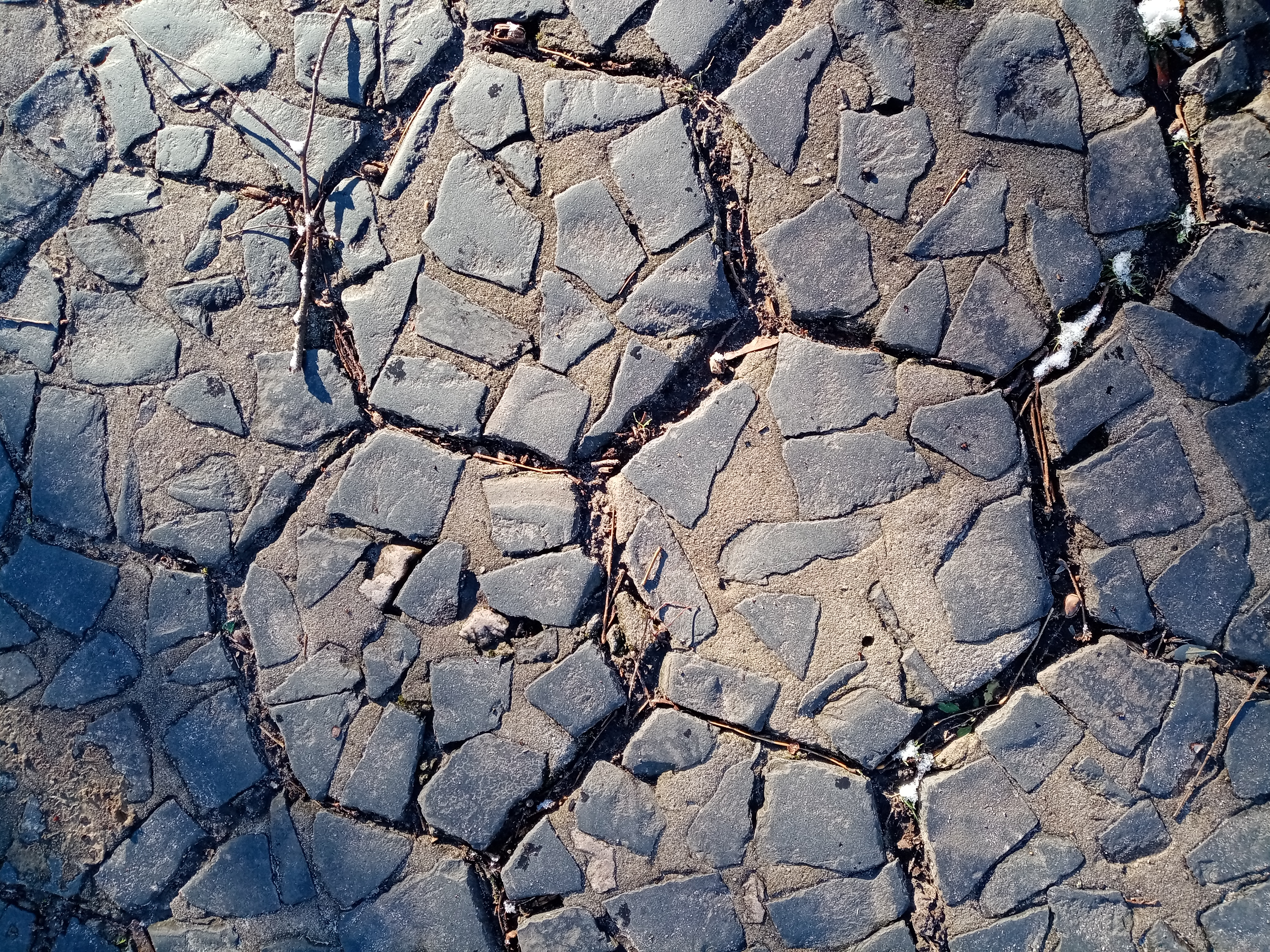
Trylinki in the hexagonal tiling

Trylinka (Polish: [trɨˈliŋka]; pl. trylinki), also known as shashka Trylins'koho (Ukrainian: шашка Трилінського, lit. 'Tryliński's paving block'), is a concrete block, typically shaped as a regular hexagon or occasionally a tetragon, with stone fragments embedded in its upper layer. The types of stone used for these embedments, such as basalt and porphyry, vary depending on local availability. Cost-effective and durable, trylinki were widely implemented in Polish road construction during the interwar period. Between 1933 and 1938, these pavers were installed across an estimated 1 million square metres (11 × 10^{6} sq ft) of roadway. Some of these paved surfaces remain extant in what are now Belarus and Ukraine.

Trylinka is named after its inventor, Władysław Tryliński, a transportation engineer credited with the engineering design of the Maurzyce Bridge, a project he shared with construction engineer Stefan Bryła. Whilst overseeing the production of aggregates and paving slabs at the Miękinia porphyry quarry, Tryliński observed that the manufacturing process generated large amounts of fragmented stone waste, leading to his idea of recycling these fragments as embedments in trylinki.

== Descriptions ==
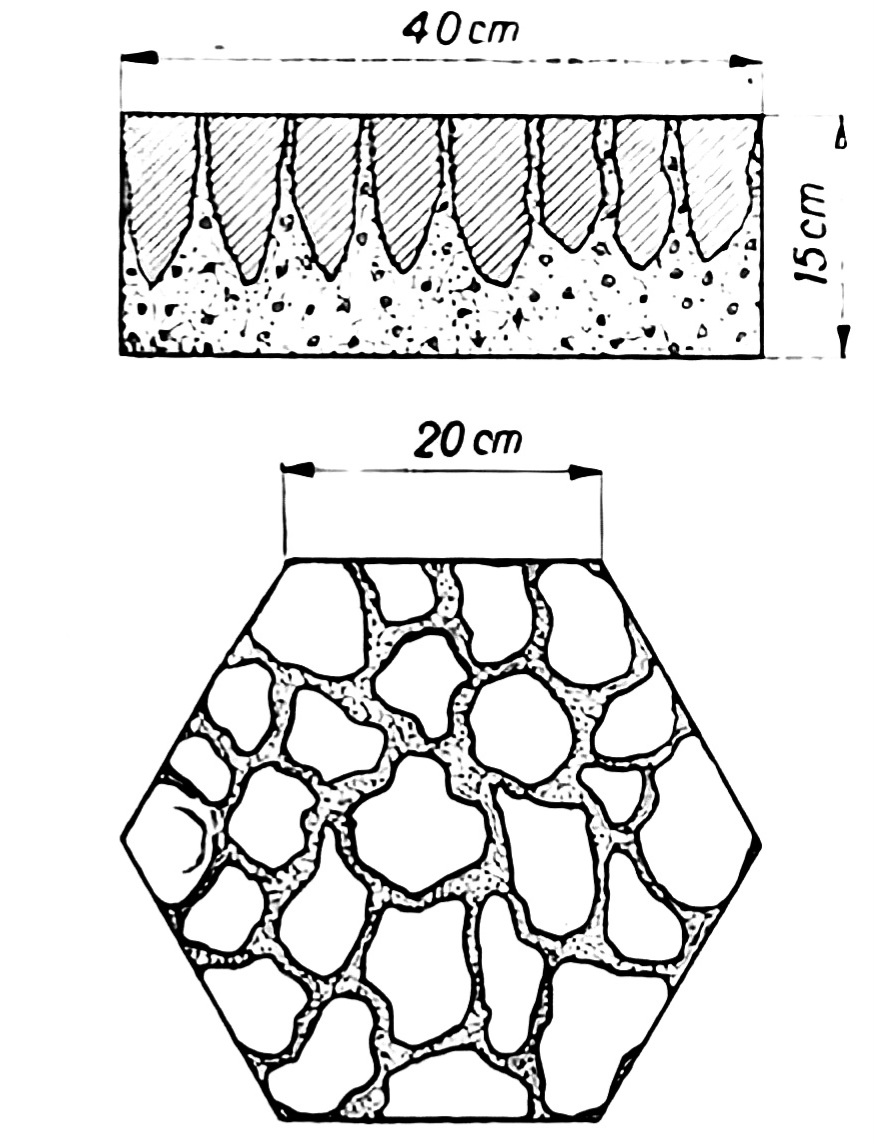
Part of the trylinka design in Tryliński's patent application; 40 cm x 15 cm is approximately 16 in x 6 in. 20 cm is about 8 in.

Władysław Tryliński filed a patent application for "driveways and sidewalks made of hexagonal concrete slabs (Polish: jezdnię drogową i chodniki z płyt betonowych sześciokątnych)" in 1932 and obtained the patent from the Patent Office of the Republic of Poland in 1933. Trylinka was designed to be 15 to 20 centimetres (6 to 8 in) thick and each of the hexagon's six sides 20 centimetres (8 in) long. Sometimes reinforced with iron wire, a trylinka typically weighs 35 to 37 kilograms (77 to 82 lb). The six sides of each hexagonal blocks were to be coated with resin and the blocks were laid tightly together on a sand-and-gravel bed in the hexagonal tiling—the gaps between the blocks being filled with asphalt.

Tryliński's patent described a manufacturing process combining concrete mortar with stone fragments to form the paving blocks. He favoured the hexagonal shape over tetragonal designs, noting that the former eliminated the long straight joints between blocks that typically constituted the roadway's weakest points.

== Uses ==
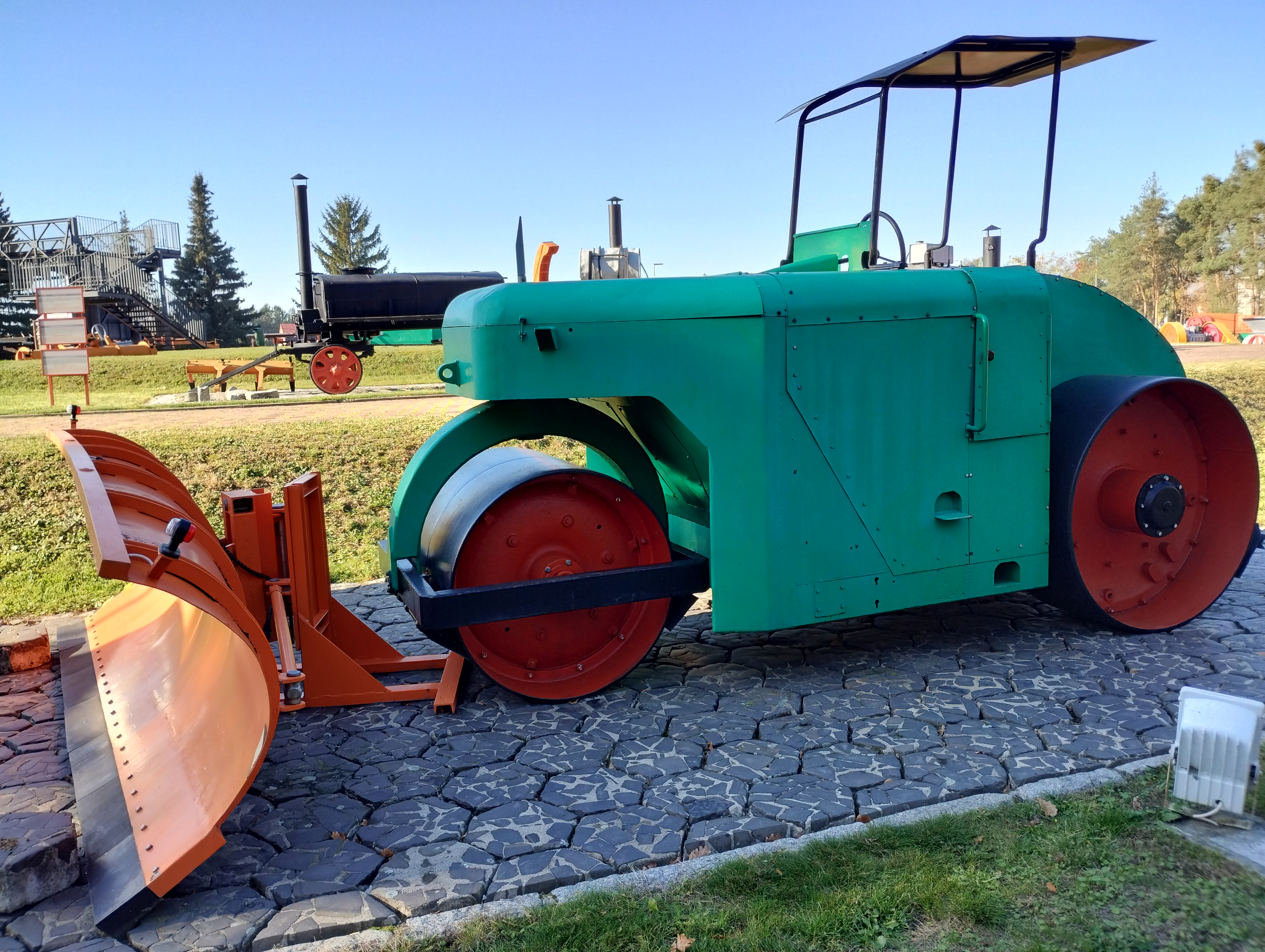
Pavement made of trylinka at the Road Engineering Museum in Szczucin, Poland

Trylinka was extensively used in the construction of roads in interwar Poland during the 1930s, due to its low cost, durability, and ease of manufacturing—as a variety of stones could be used depending on their local availability, its production was inexpensive and relatively simple. Unskilled labourers could be hired for the process because the manufacture and laying of the blocks did not require complicated tools or heavy equipments. So long as the work was organised properly, it was possible to pave 1 kilometre (0.62 mi) of road in six days. Another advantage was that trylinki pavements could be built without taking the road out of service; the pavement was laid on one side of the road, leaving the other open for traffic. Between 1933 and 1938, approximately 10 million pieces of trylinka were produced, and an estimated 1 million square metres (11×10^{6} sq ft) of surface area was covered with them.

In Volhynia, black basalt fragments from Janowa Dolina (present-day Bazaltove, Ukraine) and Berestovets were used. In Pinsk, a city in present-day Belarus, trylinka covered the central town square in 1938. Janowa Dolina's black basalt was used to make trylinka in the city. In Kraków, the second-largest city in Poland, purple porphyry from Krzeszowice, a town in the Lesser Poland Voivodeship, was used to produce trylinka; the pavement of the Nowy Kleparz market square at the exit of Długa Street is one of the extant examples.
