= Venčeslav Poniž =

Polish engineer (1900–1967)

Venčeslav Poniž (Polish: Wenczesław Poniż; 25 September 1900 – 20 November 1967) was a Polish engineer. He is best known as the author of welded steel and reinforced concrete projects of inter-war and post-war Poland. Among the best-known of his designs are such landmarks as the Maurzyce Bridge, the Prudential Tower and the Fabryka Samochodów Osobowych car factory.

== Life ==
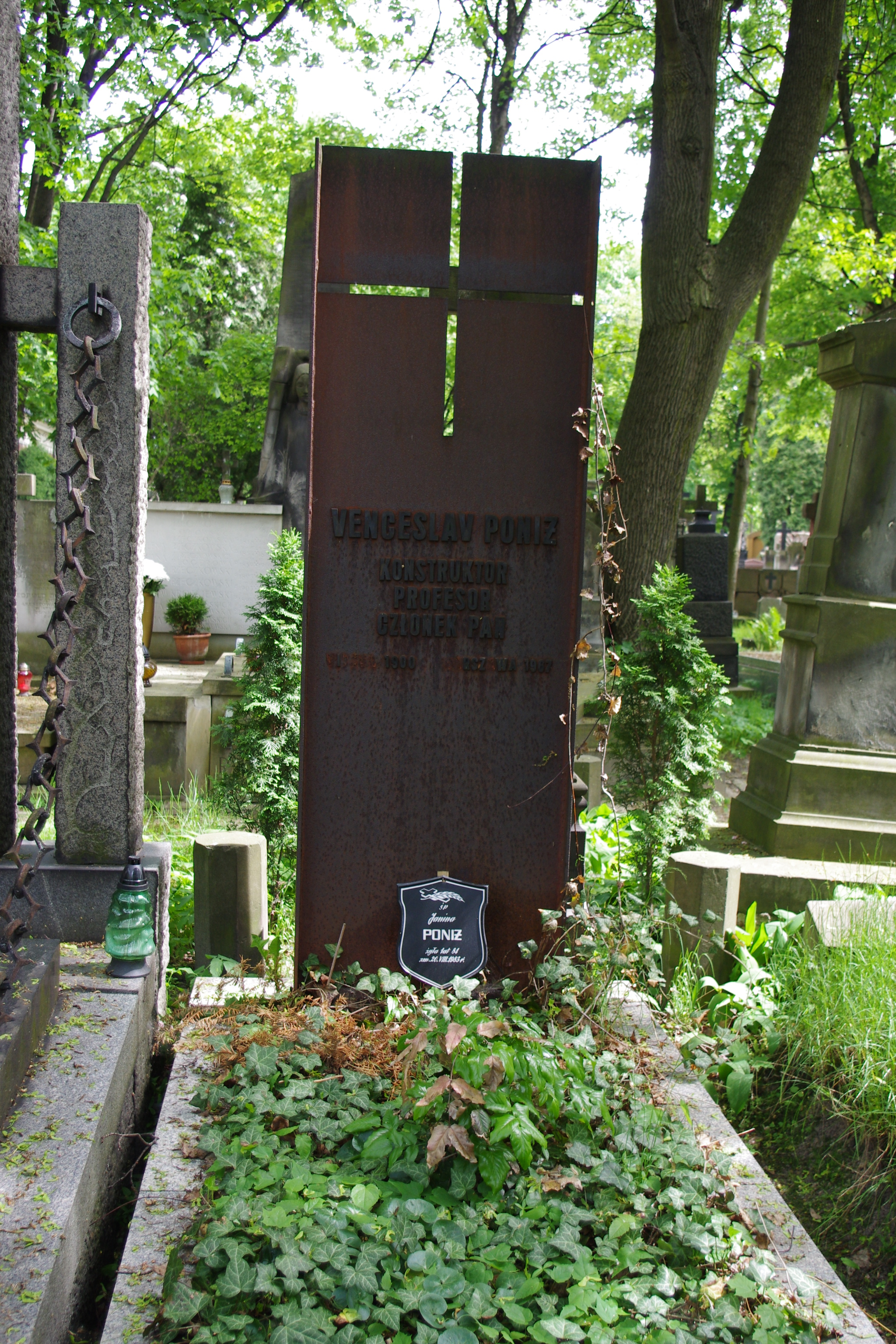
Grave of Venčeslav Poniž and his wife Janina at Warsaw's Powązki Cemetery

Poniž was born 25 September 1900 in Vipava near Trieste, then in Austria-Hungary. Soon after World War I he started his studies at the Vienna University of Technology, which he continued at the Charles University in Prague and then the Lwów University of Technology in Poland. He graduated in 1926 and soon afterwards teamed up with Stefan Bryła, with whom he designed the Maurzyce Bridge, the first all-welded road bridge in the world. The team also designed the construction of the Prudential skyscraper in Warsaw, as well as the functionalist Postal Train Station.

In 1934 his doctoral thesis was accepted and soon afterwards Poniž, until then formally a citizen of a non-existent state of Austria-Hungary, became naturalised, received his Polish passport and officially Polonised his name to Wenczesław Poniż. In 1935 he moved to Warsaw, where he became a professor at the Faculty of Architecture of the Warsaw University of Technology. During World War II, he continued his teaching in the underground universities.

After the war, in 1946 he became a full professor at the Warsaw University of Technology, and in 1960 became a full member of the Polish Academy of Sciences. Among his best-known post-war works are the reconstruction of the Mirów Halls and the Grand Theatre of Warsaw, as well as the projects of Warsaw's Eastern Wall, Warsaw Steel Mill and the Fabryka Samochodów Osobowych car factory. He died 20 November 1967 and was buried at Powązki Cemetery.
