= Drapacz Chmur =

High-rise building in Katowice, Poland

Coordinates: 50°15′15″N 19°00′49″E

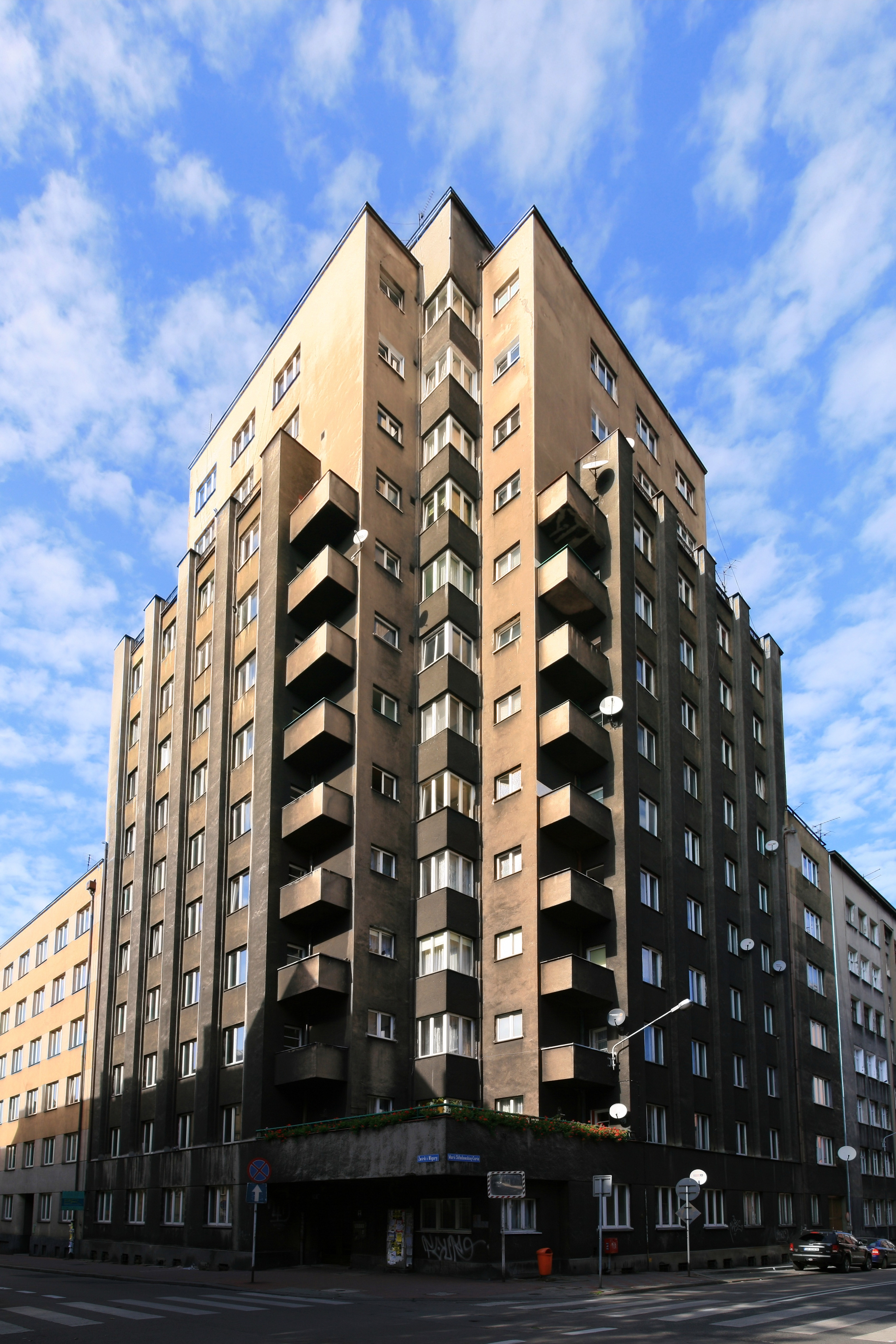
Drapacz Chmur, 2006

Drapacz Chmur (English: Skyscraper) is a historical building in Katowice, Silesia, Poland. It was the second skyscraper built in post-World War I Poland. Finished in 1934 after five years of construction, it made pioneering Polish use of steel frame construction. Today, Drapacz Chmur is considered the most spectacular and beautiful example of functionalism in Poland.

The building has seventeen stories, fourteen above the ground, and contained one of the first garbage chutes in Poland. It is 60 m tall and until 1955, it was the second highest building in the country (after Prudential, Warsaw). It was designed by architect Tadeusz Kozłowski and structural engineer Stefan Bryła to house Polish Revenue Office employees. The flats are spacious and luxurious. Gustaw Holoubek and Kazimierz Kutz were among the building's notable residents after World War II.

Drapacz Chmur is located at 15 Żwirki i Wigury Street.

== See also ==
- List of tallest buildings in Katowice
