= Prudential House =

Coordinates: 52°14′8″N 21°0′46″E

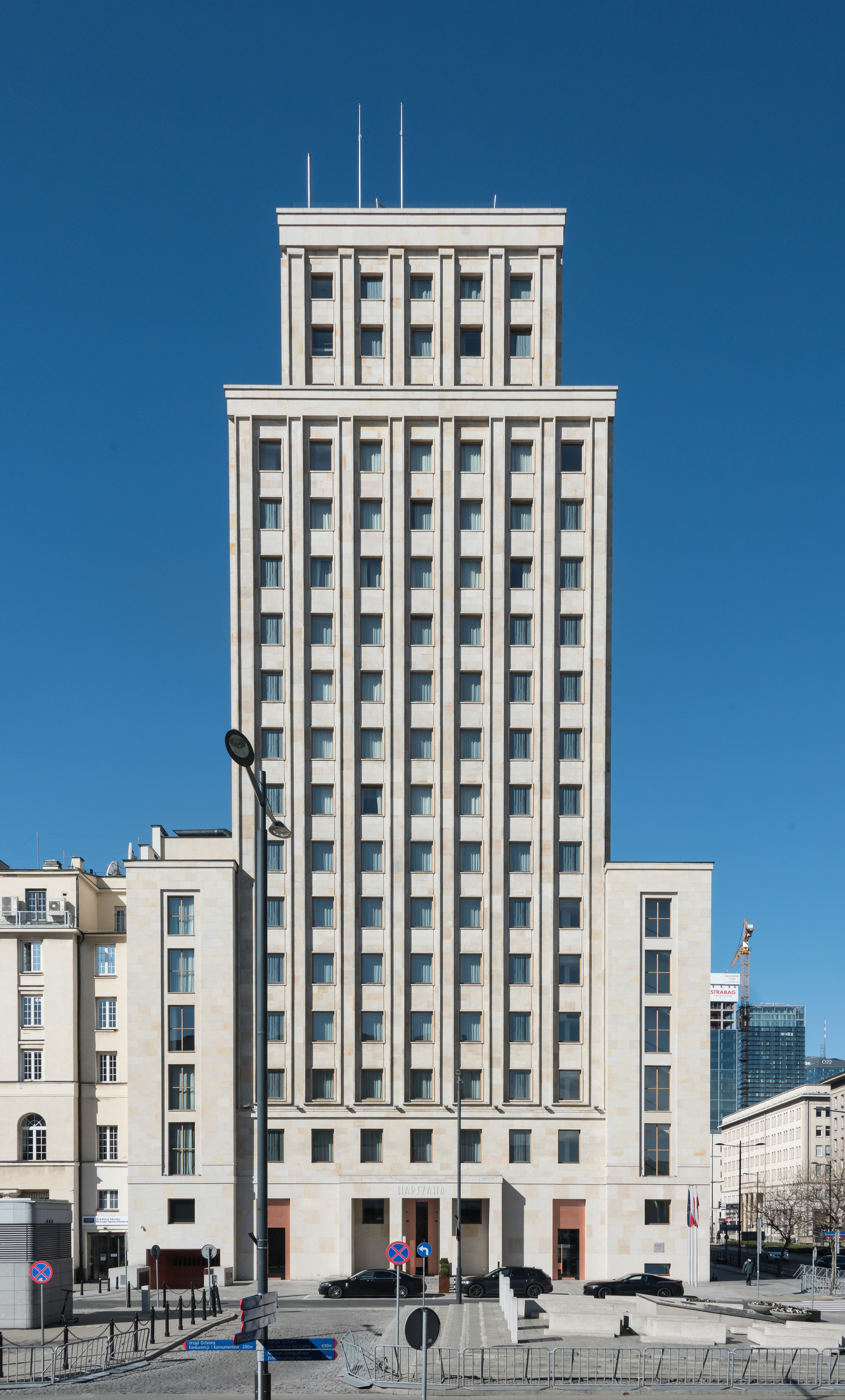
- The Prudential as seen from Warsaw Insurgents Square, 2021
- Interactive map of the Prudential House area
- Alternative names: Prudential; Hotel Warszawa

General information
- Type: Hotel
- Architectural style: Art Deco
- Location: Warsaw, Poland
- Construction started: 1931
- Completed: 1933

Height
- Height: 66 metres (217 ft)

Technical details
- Floor count: 17

Design and construction
- Architects: Marcin Weinfeld, Stefan Bryła, Wenczesław Poniż
- Developer: Prudential plc

The Prudential House, officially known now as the Hotel Warszawa, is a historic skyscraper hotel in Warsaw, Poland, located on Warsaw Insurgents Square along Świętokrzyska Street. Built between 1931 and 1933 in the Art Deco style, it served as a base for the British Prudential Insurance Company. It was the tallest building in interwar Poland.

== History ==
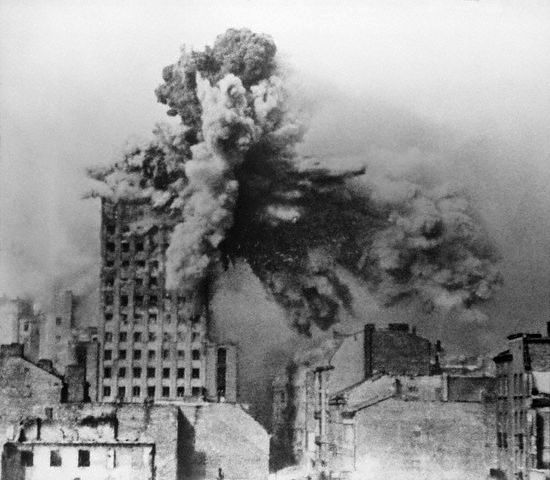
World War II: 28 August 1944, an iconic photo by Sylwester Braun which captured the moment when the building was hit by a 2-ton mortar artillery shell during the Warsaw Uprising.

At the time of its construction, the 18-story, 66 m Prudential House was the fourth-tallest skyscraper in Europe, after Ullsteinhaus, Telefónica Building and Boerentoren (the tallest). Built using a steel framework, it was the tallest building in Warsaw until the Palace of Culture and Science was completed in 1955. Designed by Marcin Weinfeld, the Prudential House included office space on the lower stories and luxury apartments further up. The steel framework, which was innovative at the time, was designed by Stefan Bryła and Wenczesław Poniż. Construction started in 1931 and used over 2 million bricks, 2 thousand tonnes of concrete, and 1,500 tonnes of steel.

In 1936, a 27-meter antenna was constructed on the roof by professor Janusz Groszkowski, who started the first television broadcasts in Europe from the facility. The Prudential House soon became a symbol of modern Warsaw and was featured in numerous contemporary films and advertisements.

The structure was heavily damaged during World War II, particularly during the Warsaw Uprising, when it was hit by approximately 1,000 artillery shells, including a 2-tonne Karl-Gerät mortar shell, leaving only the steel framework standing. The artillery damage bent the tower sideways, but it survived the war and was featured on numerous anti-war posters.

The tower was repaired after the war and turned into a hotel, and its design style was adapted from early modernism to socialist realism. The building's original architect, Marcin Weinfeld, adapted the building to its new role as a hotel. The Hotel Warszawa opened in 1954 and included 375 rooms, a large restaurant, a café, and a nightclub.

In 2002, the Hotel Warszawa closed and the building was sold. In 2010, it was purchased by the Likus Group, which began a slow and controversial refurbishment. The façade was returned to its pre-war art deco form, while the socialist-realist interior was completely gutted and rebuilt in a contemporary style.

In November 2018, the 142-room Hotel Warszawa reopened as a five-star hotel.

== Gallery ==
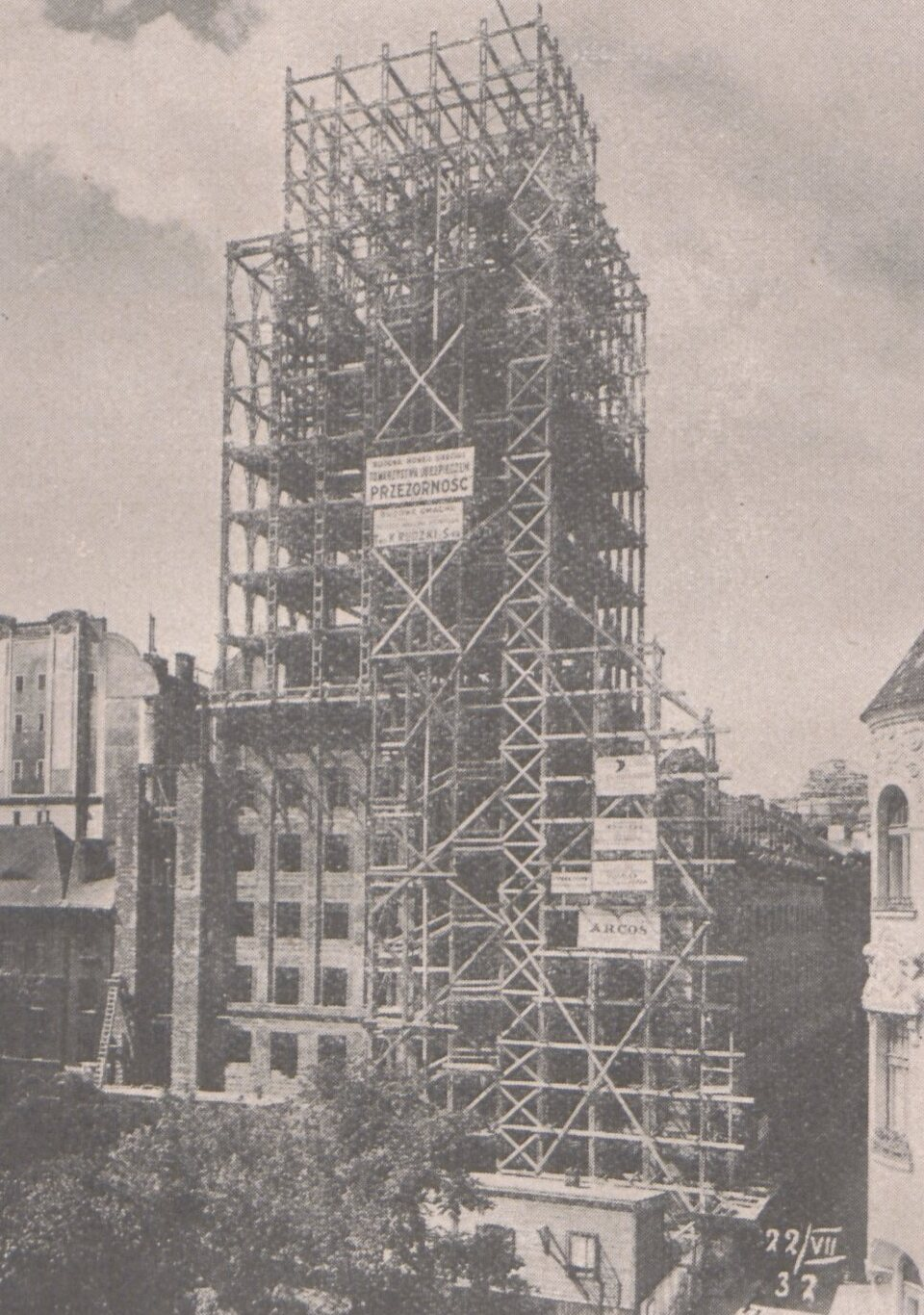
Steel skeleton of the tower

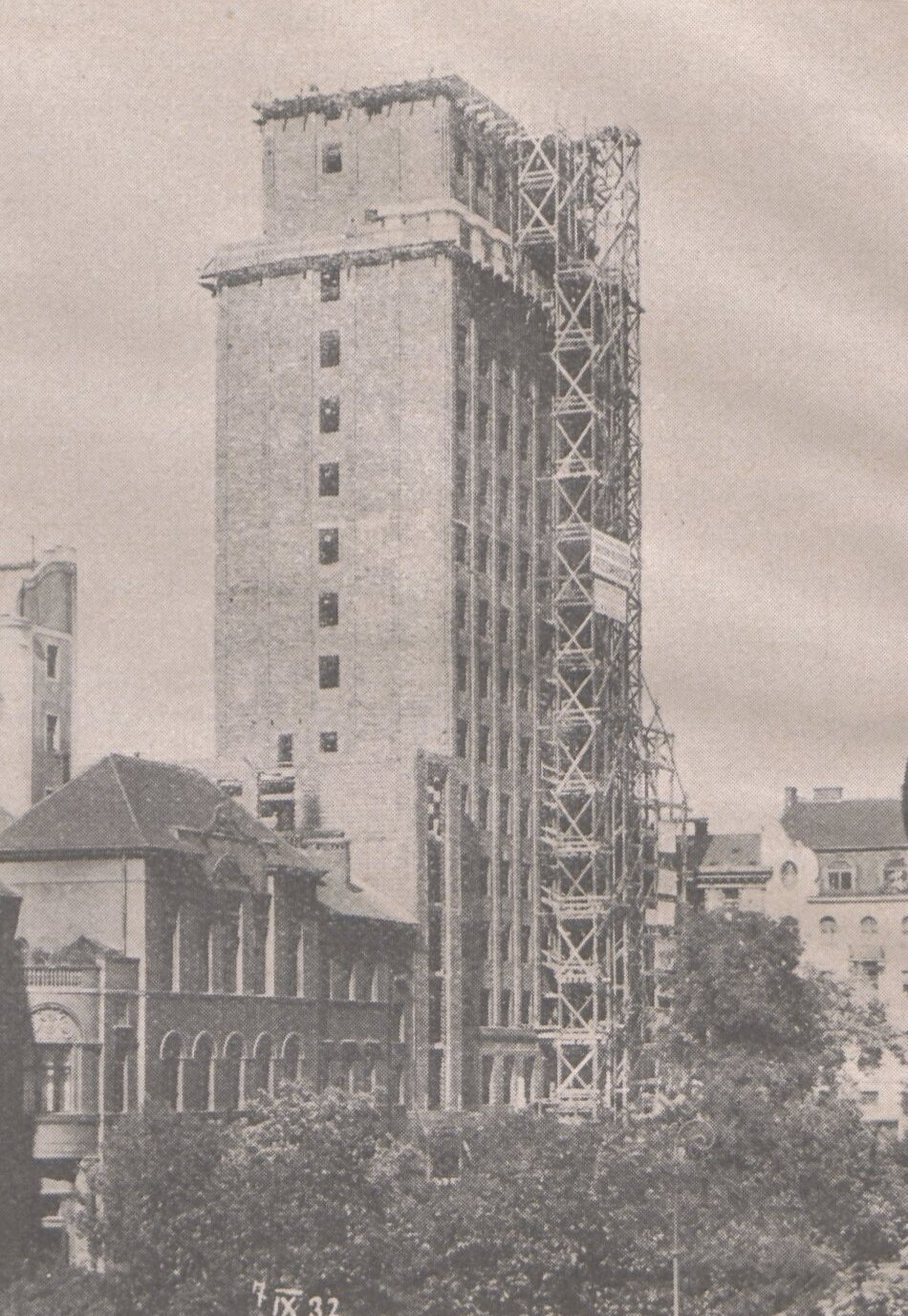
The building in a shell state

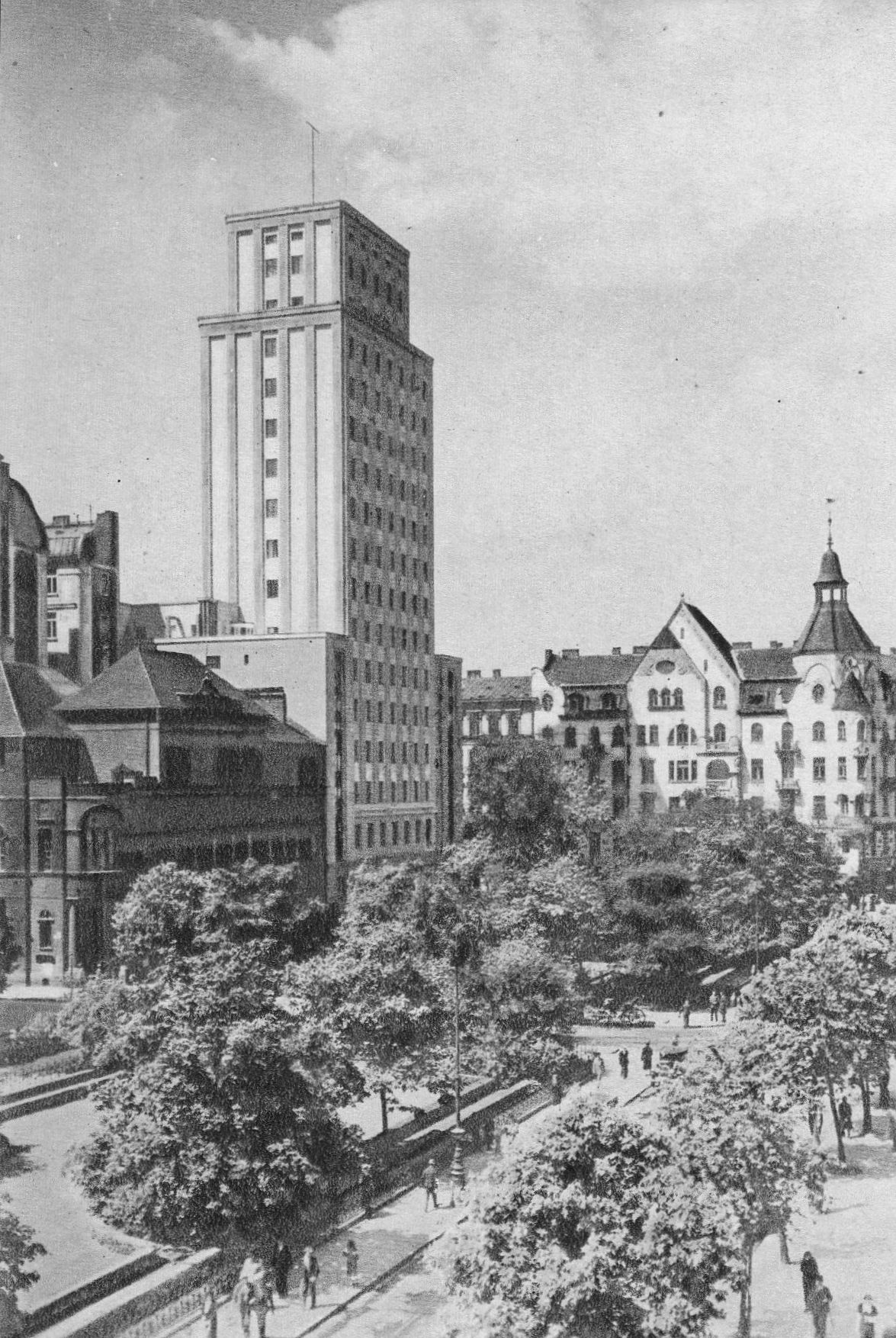
Prudential House, before 1939

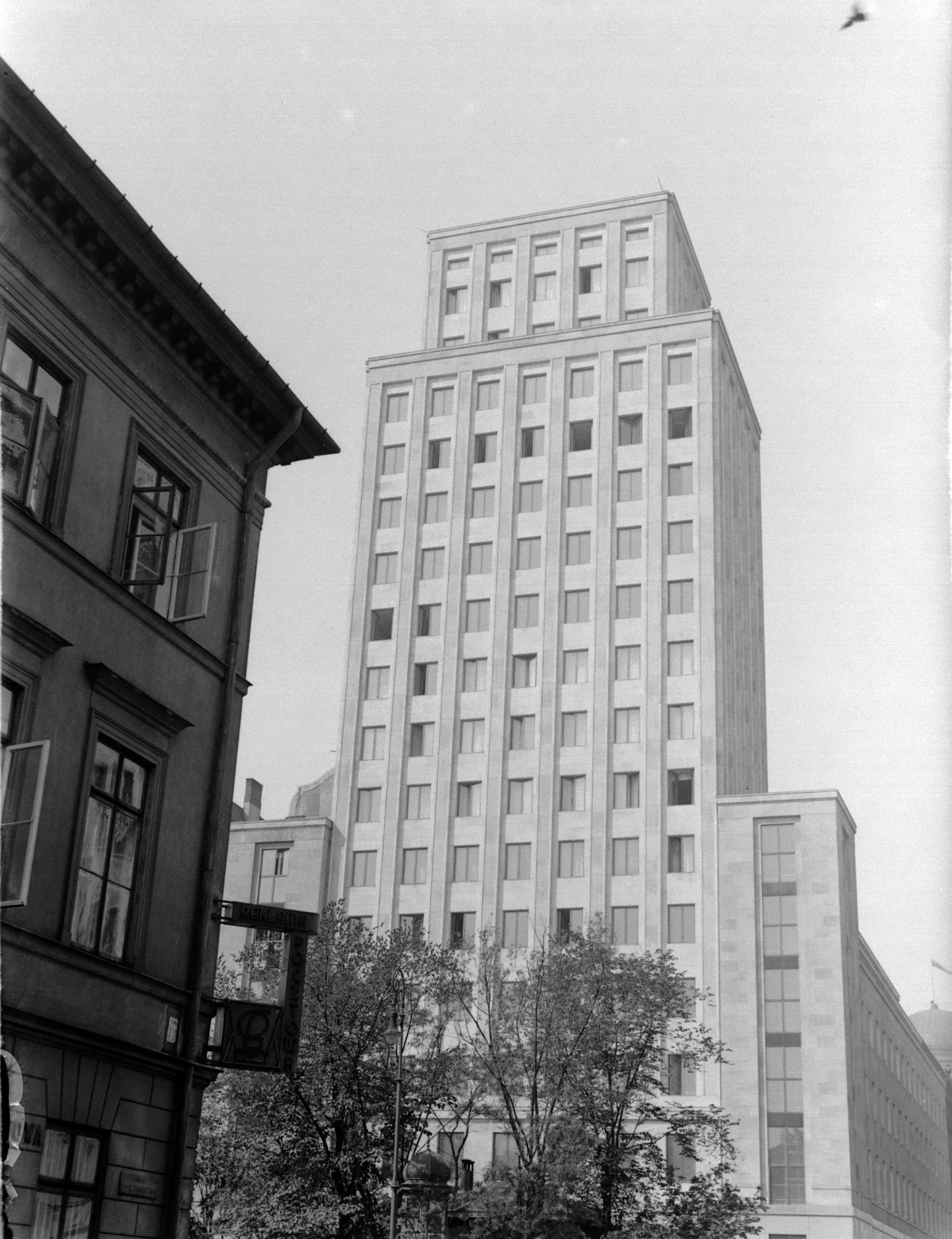
Prudential House, 1934

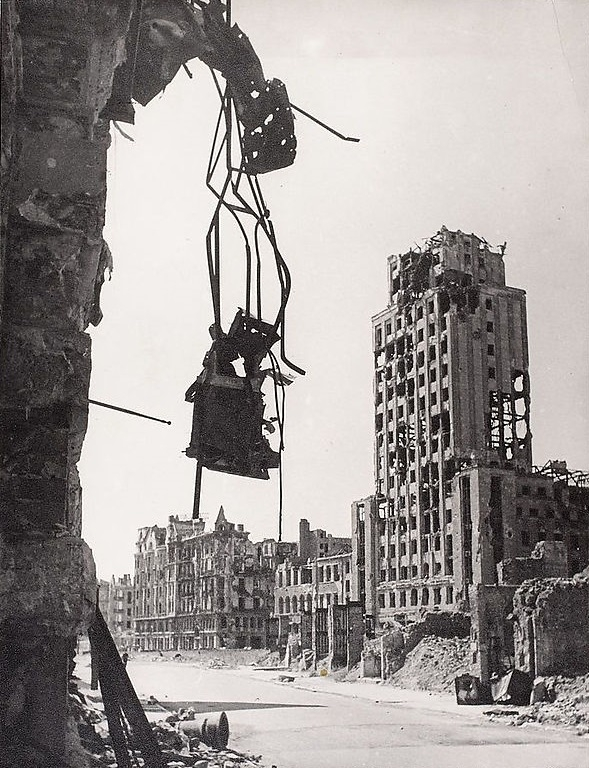
Heavily damaged skyscraper after the war

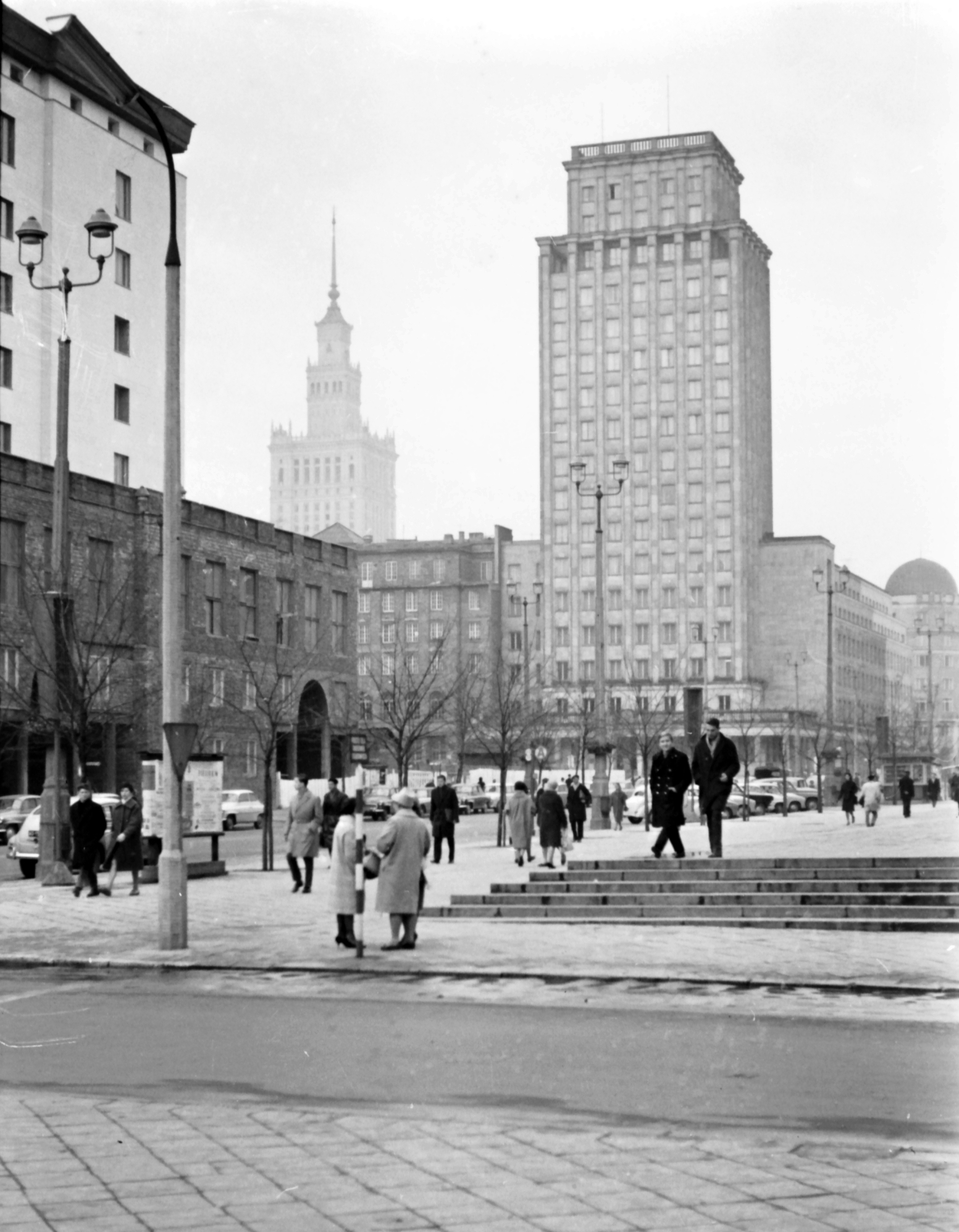
Hotel Warszawa, 1963

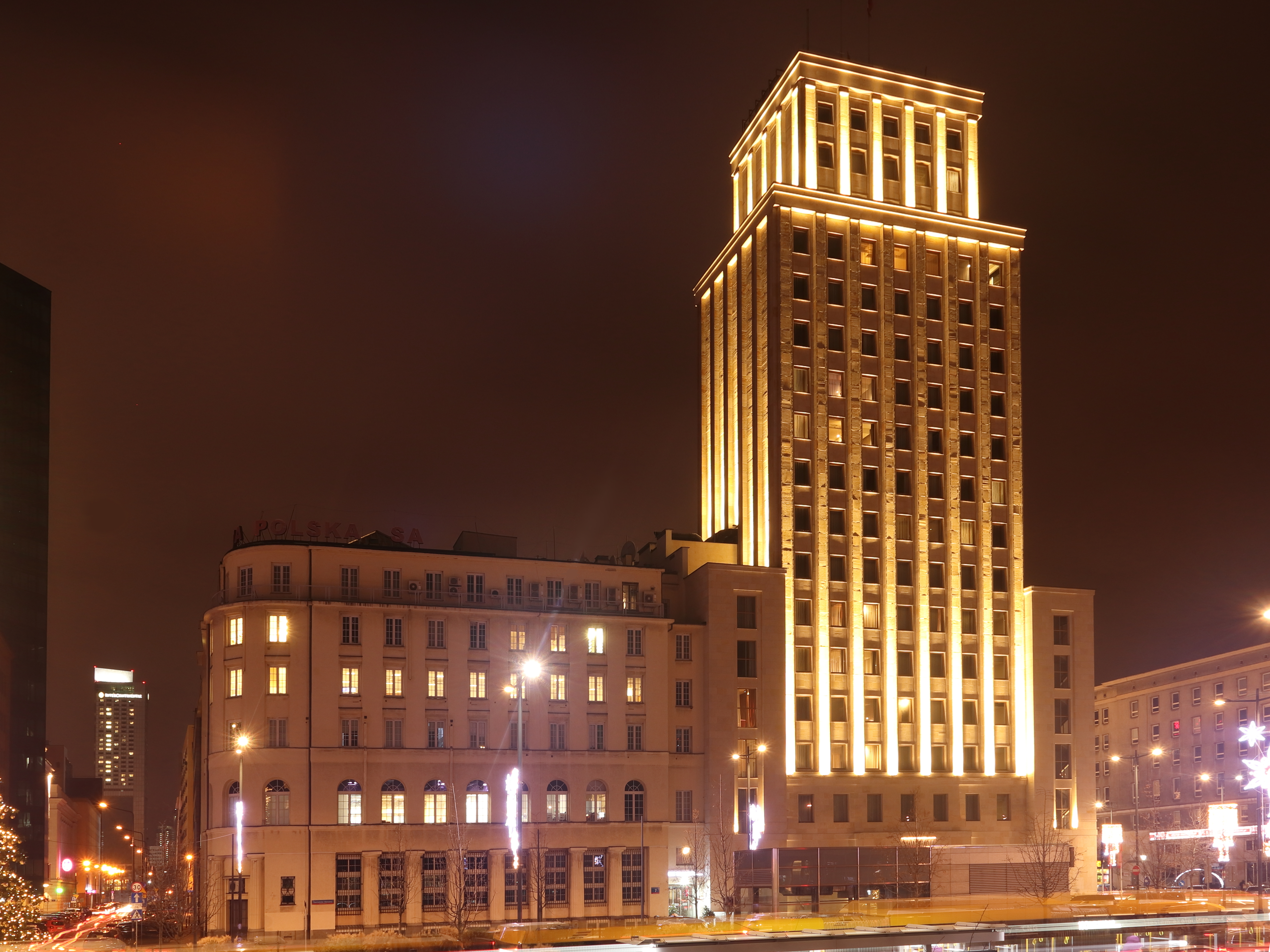
Hotel Warszawa, 2019

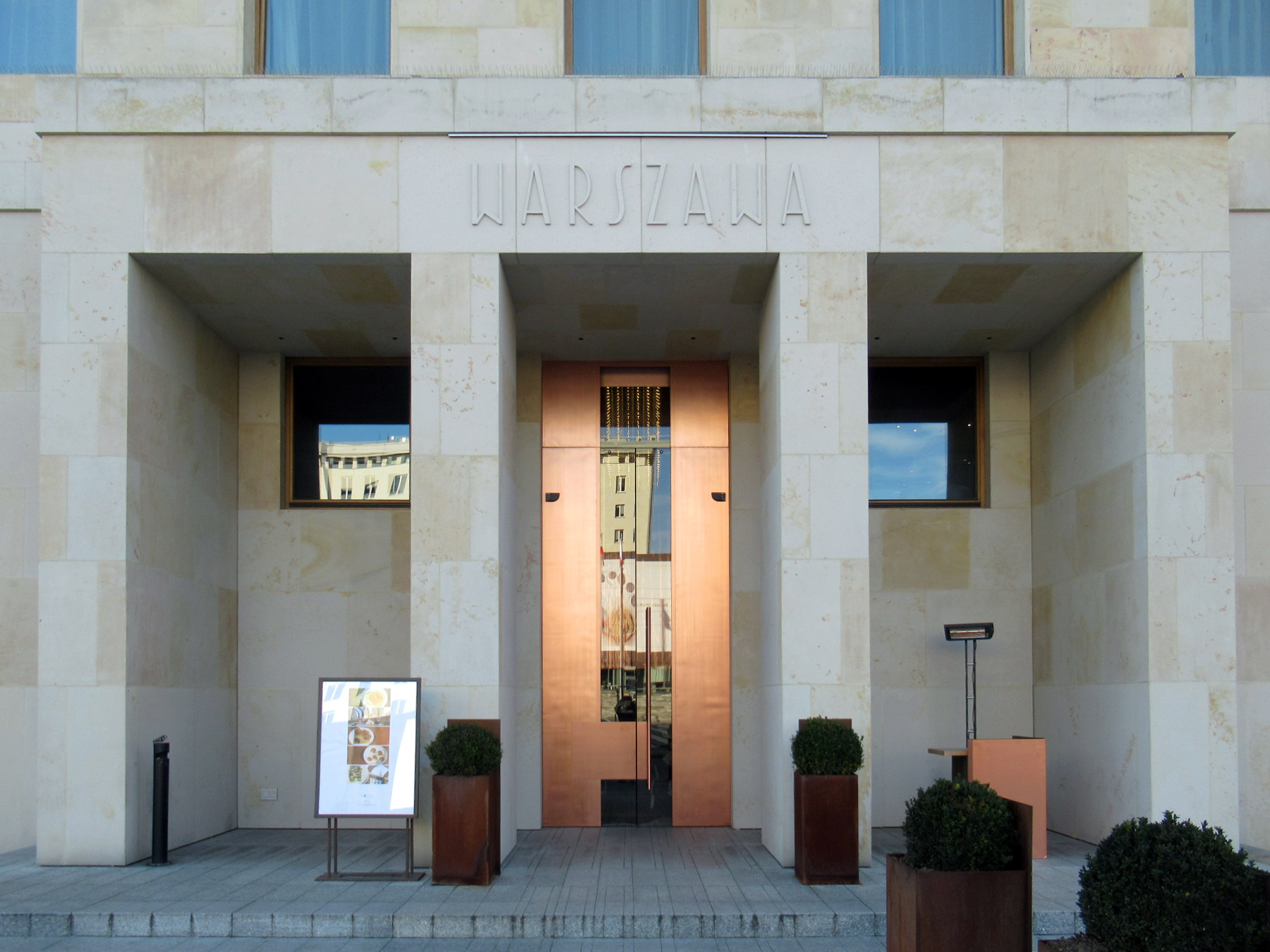
Entrance

== See also ==
- PAST
- Architecture of Warsaw
- List of tallest buildings in Poland
