= Stefan Bryła =

Polish civil engineer (1886–1943)

Stefan Władysław Bryła
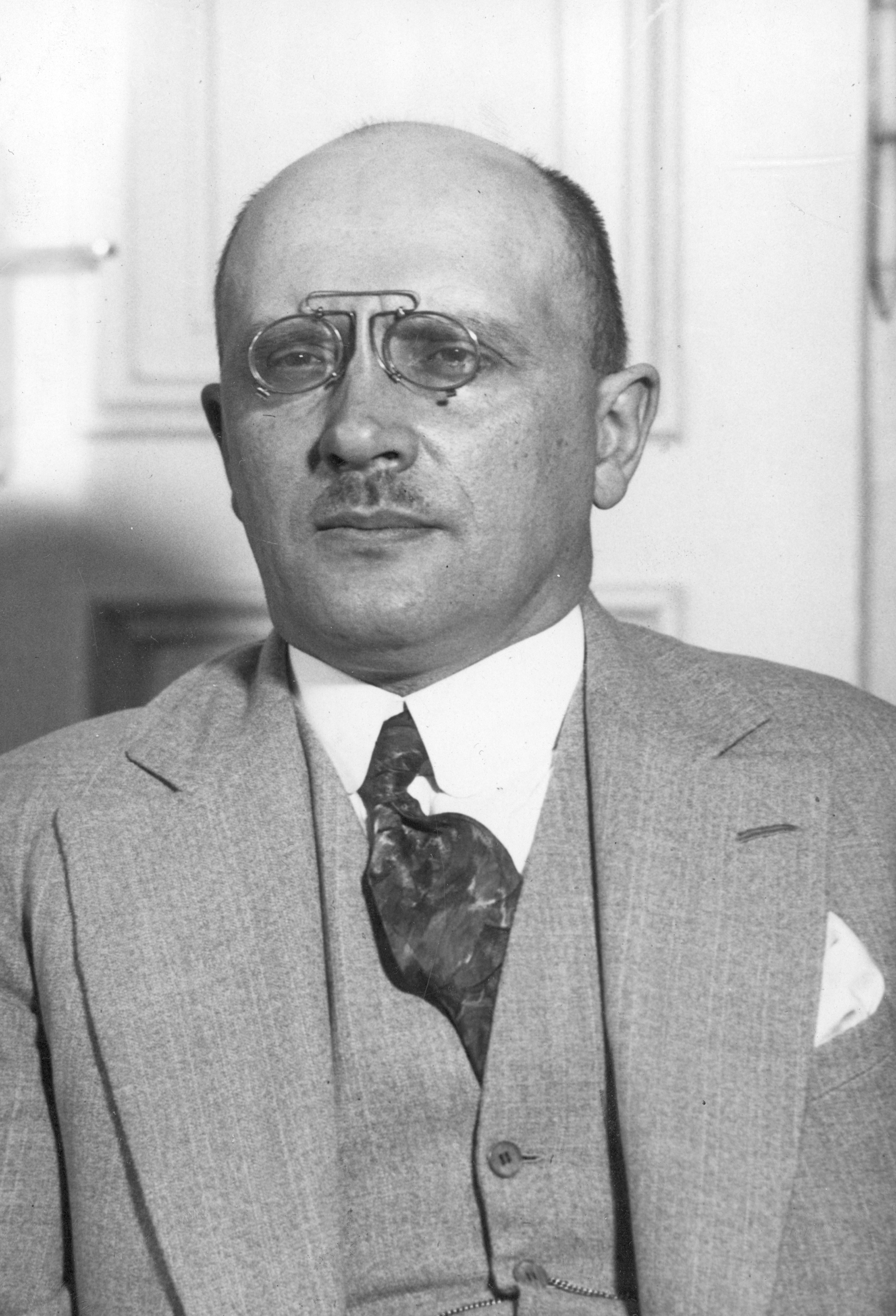
- Born: 17 August 1886; Kraków, Kingdom of Galicia and Lodomeria, Austria-Hungary
- Died: 9 December 1943 (aged 57); Warsaw, Poland
- Citizenship: Polish
- Education: Lwów Polytechnic
- Known for: the first welded bridge in the world
- Spouse: Maria Tustanowska
- Relatives: Stanisław Bryła (brother)
- Scientific career
- Fields: Construction engineering
- Workplaces: Lwów Polytechnic; Warsaw University of Technology
- Thesis: A Contribution to the Generalization of Planar Concepts in Structural Statics (1909)

Stefan Władysław Bryła (Polish pronunciation: [ˈstɛfan vwaˈdɨswav ˈbrɨwa]; born 17 August 1886 in Kraków – died 3 December 1943 in Warsaw, Poland) was a Polish construction engineer and welding pioneer. He was a professor at the Lwów Polytechnic and the Warsaw University of Technology and is known for designing and building the first welded road bridge in the world.

In 1943, during World War II, Bryła was arrested by German Nazis and executed as part of the Aktion AB aimed at eliminating the intellectuals and leaders of the Second Polish Republic.

== Life and career ==
=== Early life and education ===
Bryła was born on 17 August 1886 in Kraków, then part of the Kingdom of Galicia and Lodomeria within Austria-Hungary, to Polish parents. His father, Paweł, was a Polish language teacher who later served as headmaster of a gymnasium in Stanisławów (now Ivano-Frankivsk, Ukraine). His mother was Eligia (née Chrzanowska), a journalist and social activist.

He completed his secondary education in Stanisławów. Bryła subsequently studied at the Faculty of Engineering of the Lwów Polytechnic graduating in 1908. His professors included Kazimierz Bartel and Maksymilian Thullie. Bryła's knowledge and commitment set him apart from his peers, as evidenced by the fact that he served as a university assistant since 1907, while still a student. He earned his doctorate at the university in 1909 based on his thesis Przyczynek do uogólnienia pojęć płaszczyznowych statyki budowli (A Contribution to the Generalization of Planar Concepts in Structural Statics). In 1910, he obtained his habilitation.

From 1910 until 1912, Bryła continued his education abroad thanks to the support received from the Kraków-based Academy of Learning. He studied at Konigliche Technische Hochschule zu Berlin (currently Technische Universität Berlin), École nationale des ponts et chaussées and the University of London. In the following years, he visited the United States, Canada, Iceland, Japan, China, Korea, and Siberia.

=== World War I and military service ===
In 1914, he married Maria (née Tustanowska), a pianist and graduate of the Lwów Conservatory. They embarked on a honeymoon trip to the Middle East and the Caucasus; however, they were unable to return due to the outbreak of the World War I. They were interned in Tbilisi and later moved to Kyiv, where Bryła worked as an engineer for the Moscow–Kyiv–Voronezh Railway Society, designing, among other projects, the reinforced concrete bridge in Darnytsia and the steel bridge over the Dnieper.

In 1915–1917, he lectured at the Polish University College in Kyiv and was active within the Polish community in the city, serving as president of the Association of Engineers and Technicians in Russia. In 1918, Bryła participated in the fighting for Lwów during the Polish–Ukrainian War and in 1919–1920 he fought in the Polish–Bolshevik War, including in the defense of Warsaw.

=== Professional career ===
In 1919, Bryła joined the Ministry of Public Works in Warsaw, serving as head of the Bridge Department. In 1921, he assumed the chair of the Second Department of Bridge Construction at the Lwów Polytechnic, becoming a full professor. From 1934, he lectured at the Warsaw Polytechnic (currently the Warsaw University of Technology) serving as dean of the Faculty of Architecture in 1938–1939.

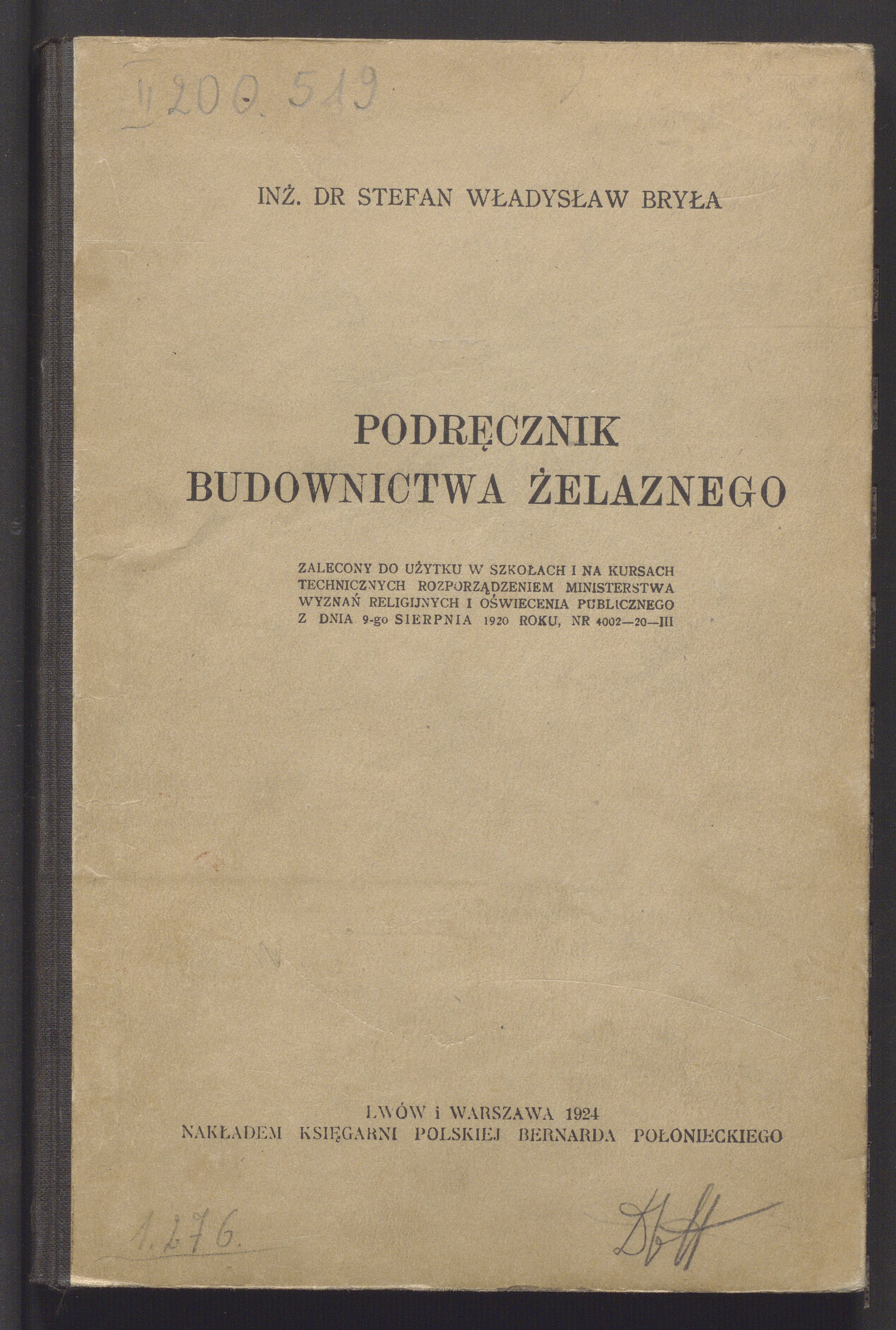
A Handbook of Iron Construction by Bryła, 1924

Bryła was the author of basic methods of welding steel structures. In 1927, he designed the Maurzyce Bridge, the first welded road bridge in the world. It was erected across the Słudwia River in Maurzyce near Łowicz, Poland in 1929, with the steel elements having been prefabricated by the Polish engineering company K. Rudzki i S-ka. By eliminating rivets, the entire structure was more than 20 percent lighter, which resulted in substantial savings in materials and reduced the overall cost of erecting the bridge. This was a revolutionary innovation, which changed the way that buildings are constructed in the world to this day. The success of the Maurzyce Bridge also demonstrated that welded steel was safe and capable of bearing the loads of passing vehicles.

The bridge was still in use in 1977 at which point plans were undertaken to replace it with a wider structure. Consequently, the bridge was reinstalled as a historical monument at a site slightly upstream. In 1928, he prepared, for the Ministry of Public Works, the world’s first regulations governing the welding of steel structures in construction.

A notable example of Bryła's work is the Dom bez Kantów building (House Without Edges) in Warsaw. The use of a massive reinforced concrete frame made it possible to create the characteristic smooth façades without protruding corners. In this project, structural and architectural logic were fully unified, expressed in simple geometry, high rigidity, and a complete integration of functional requirements. The building is regarded as one of the most recognizable examples of Warsaw’s institutional modernism.

Bryła also designed high-rise buildings: Drapacz Chmur in Katowice and the Prudential House in Warsaw (the tallest building in interwar Poland) in 1932. The strength of Prudential's structure was confirmed in 1944 during the Warsaw Uprising, when the building was hit by 120 artillery shells yet survived the bombardment. Bryła also took part in the construction of the 250-meter tall Woolworth Building in New York, the tallest building in the world at the time. During his stay in North America, he gained further experience by observing and participating in the construction of the Quebec Bridge across St. Lawrence River, co-designed by his compatriot Ralph Modjeski. Bryła was a member of the Technical Sciences Academy and a co‑founder of the Polish Association of Construction Engineers (Polish: Polski Związek Inżynierów Budowlanych).

A monograph published by the Polish Academy of Sciences, which includes a list of Bryła's works, contains 265 entries. He was the initiator, editor-in-chief and the author of seven chapters of the four-volume Podręcznik inżynierski (Engineering Handbook), published between 1927–32, which is regarded as the first Polish encyclopaedia specifically devoted to construction.

=== Political activity ===
In 1923–1926, Bryła served as head of the Lwów branch of the Polish Christian Democratic Party (PSChD), a Polish right wing Christian democracy political party whose main leader was Wojciech Korfanty. He was also elected a member of parliament to the Sejm in the I, II and III terms (1926–1935) from the Lwów constituency. He was an advocate of reaching an agreement with the Sanation political movement. As a parliamentarian, he supported efforts to develop infrastructure and technical education in the country stating that "engineering is a moral obligation towards the nation". In 1934, Bryła split the PSChD, establishing the pro‑Piłsudski Christian‑Social Union (Polish: Zjednoczenie Chrześcijańsko-Społeczne).

=== World War II and death ===
During World War II, Bryła taught at the Secret Universities, starting in winter 1940, serving as a Dean of the Faculty of Architecture of the Warsaw Polytechnic. Working for the Polish Underground State, he prepared a ten‑year plan for Poland’s postwar reconstruction and drafted a Kedyw manual titled How to Destroy Steel Bridges. His secret teaching activities led to his arrest by the Germans on 16 November 1943, together with his family. After a brief incarceration in the Pawiak prison, he was subsequently executed during the Action AB by the Germans in Warsaw on 3 December 1943 at 13 Puławska Street. His symbolic commemorative grave is located at the Powązki Cemetery in Warsaw.

In 1939, Bryła's younger brother, Stanisław, who served as president of the court in Lublin, was also killed by Germans.

== Remembrance ==
In 1964, the Polish Association of Construction Engineers and Technicians established the Stefan Bryła Award, granted annually as a one‑time distinction for outstanding scientific, research, or technical achievements in the field of structural engineering.

In 1994, the Faculty of Architecture Council of the Warsaw University of Technology bestowed the name of Professor Stefan Bryła on one of the rooms in the Architecture Building at 55 Koszykowa Street.

In 1995, the American Welding Society presented a Historic Welded Structure Award for the Maurzyce Bridge designed by Bryła to Poland.

In 2011, a commemorative plaque in honour of Bryła was officially unveiled at the Jagiellonian Library main building on the 125th anniversary of his birth. Streets and schools bearing the name of Stefan Bryła include places located in Warsaw, Pruszków, and Białystok.

== Major projects ==
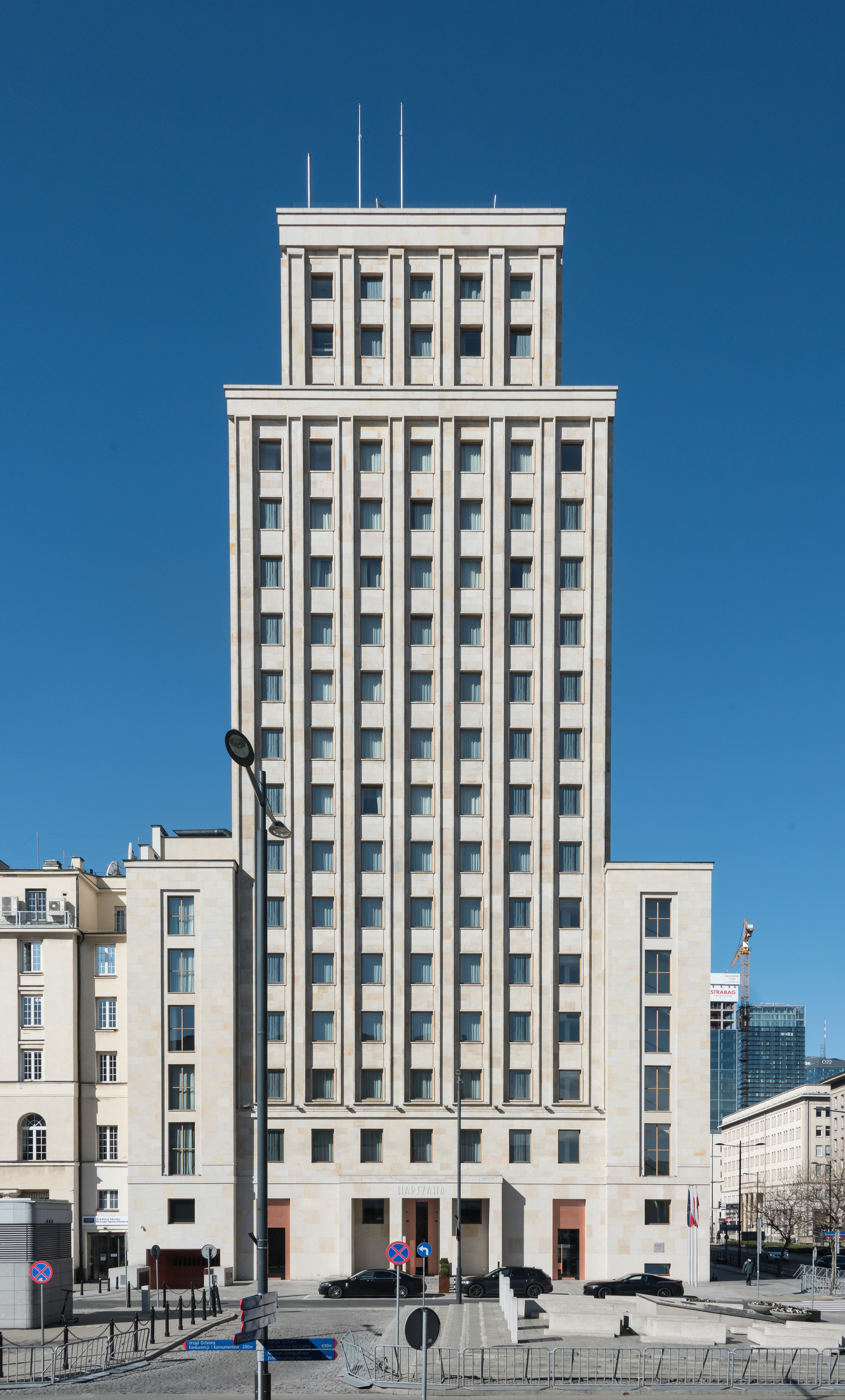
Prudential, Warsaw

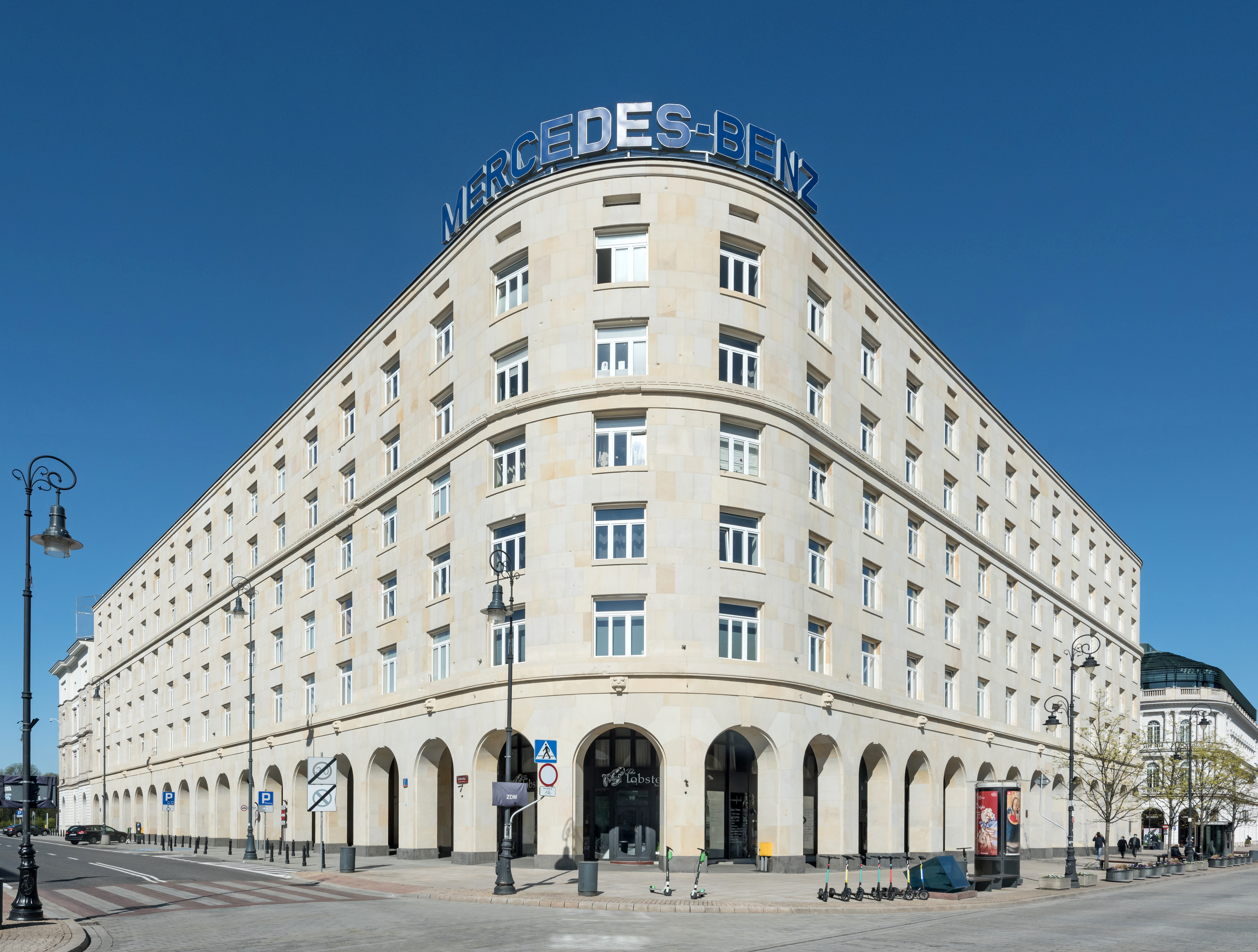
Dom Bez Kantów ("House Without Edges"), Warsaw

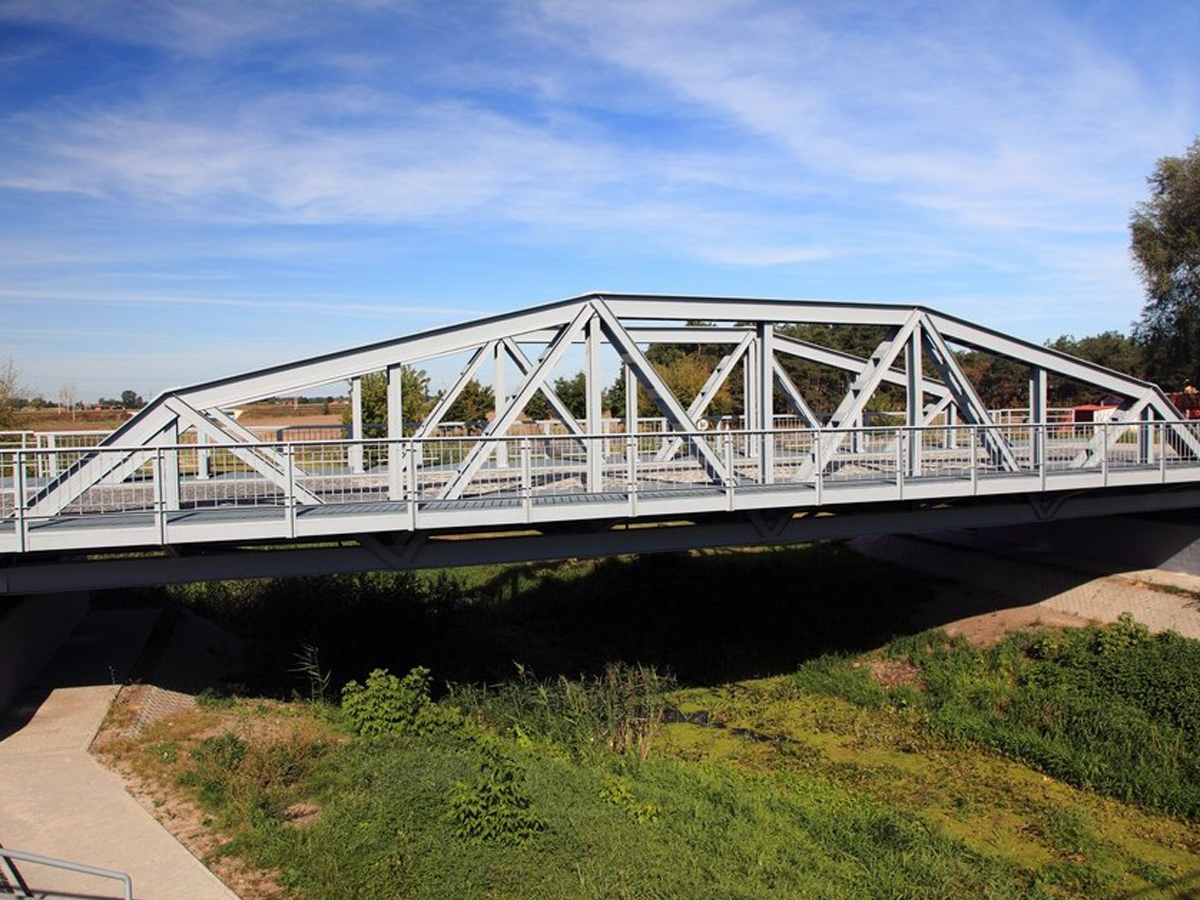
Maurzyce Bridge

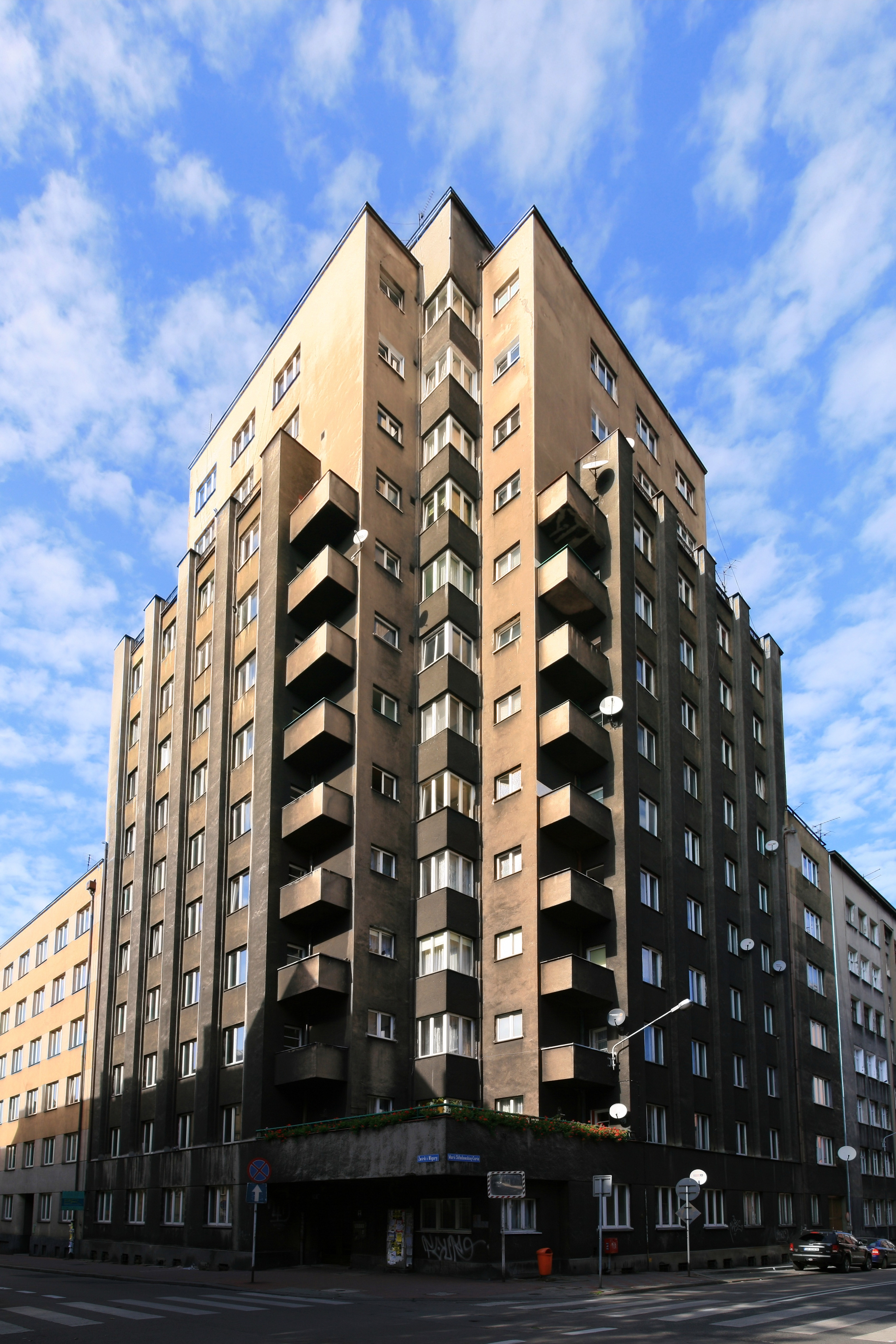
Drapacz Chmur, Katowice

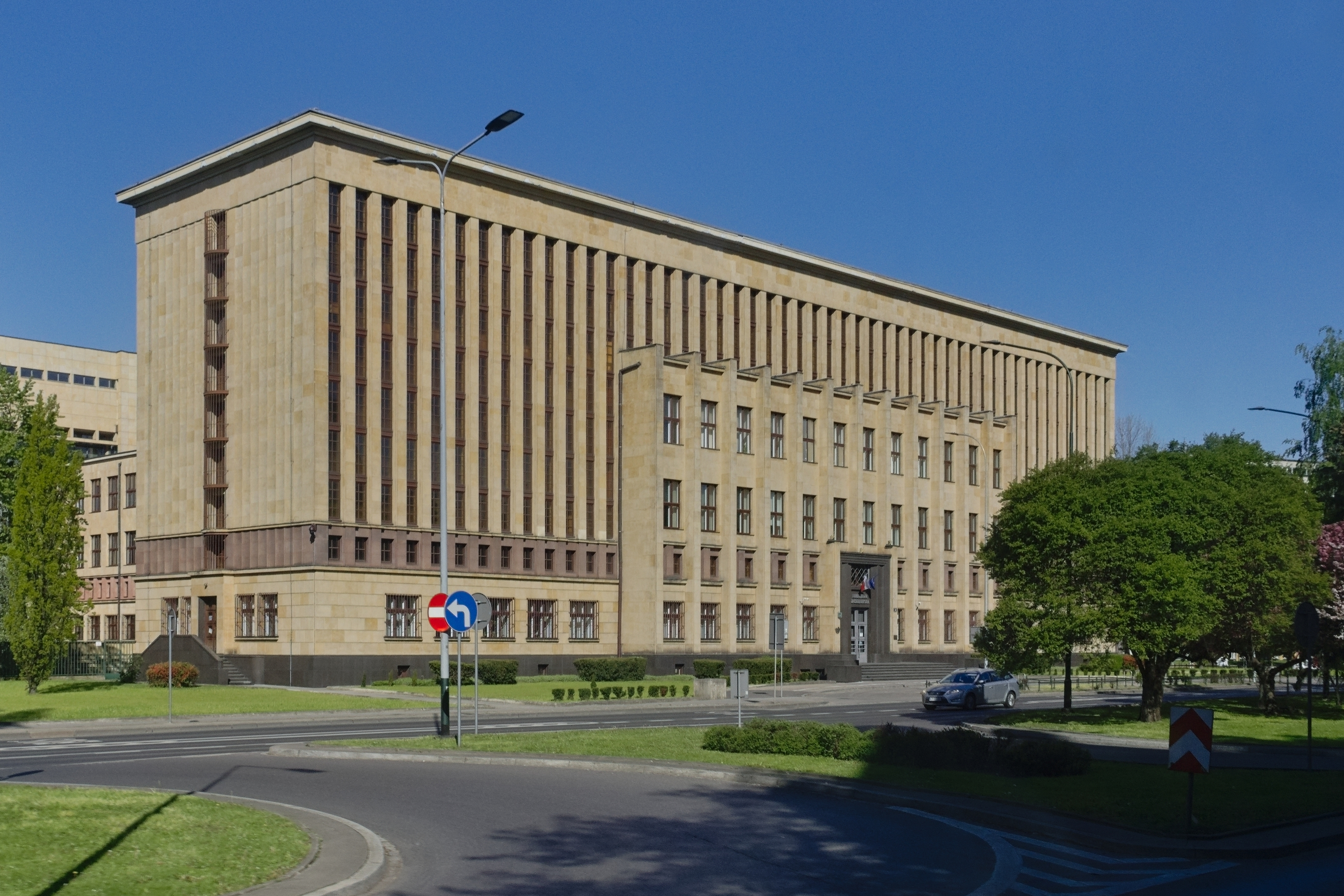
Jagiellonian Library, Kraków

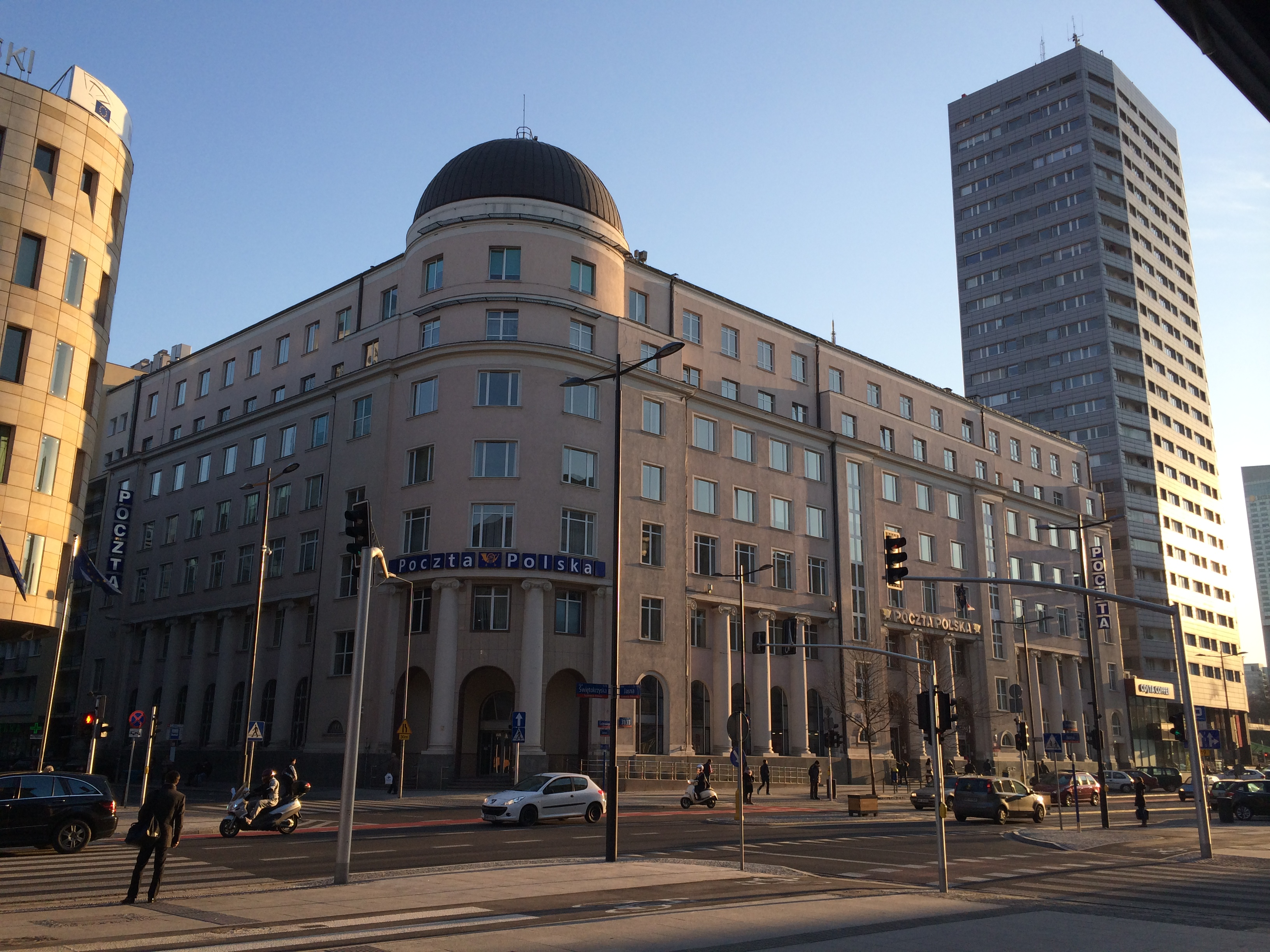
PKO Building, Warsaw

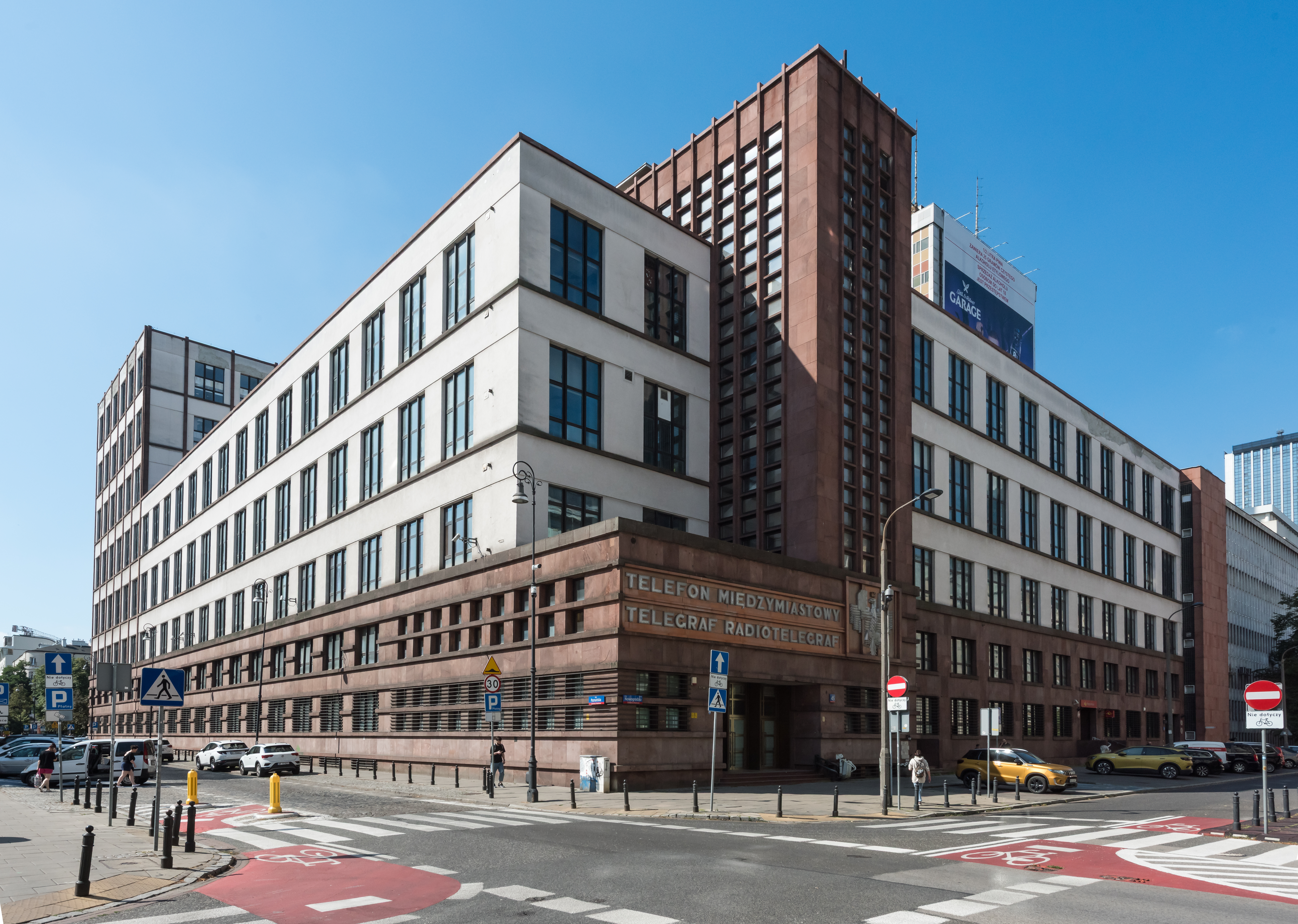
Telecommunication Office Building, Warsaw

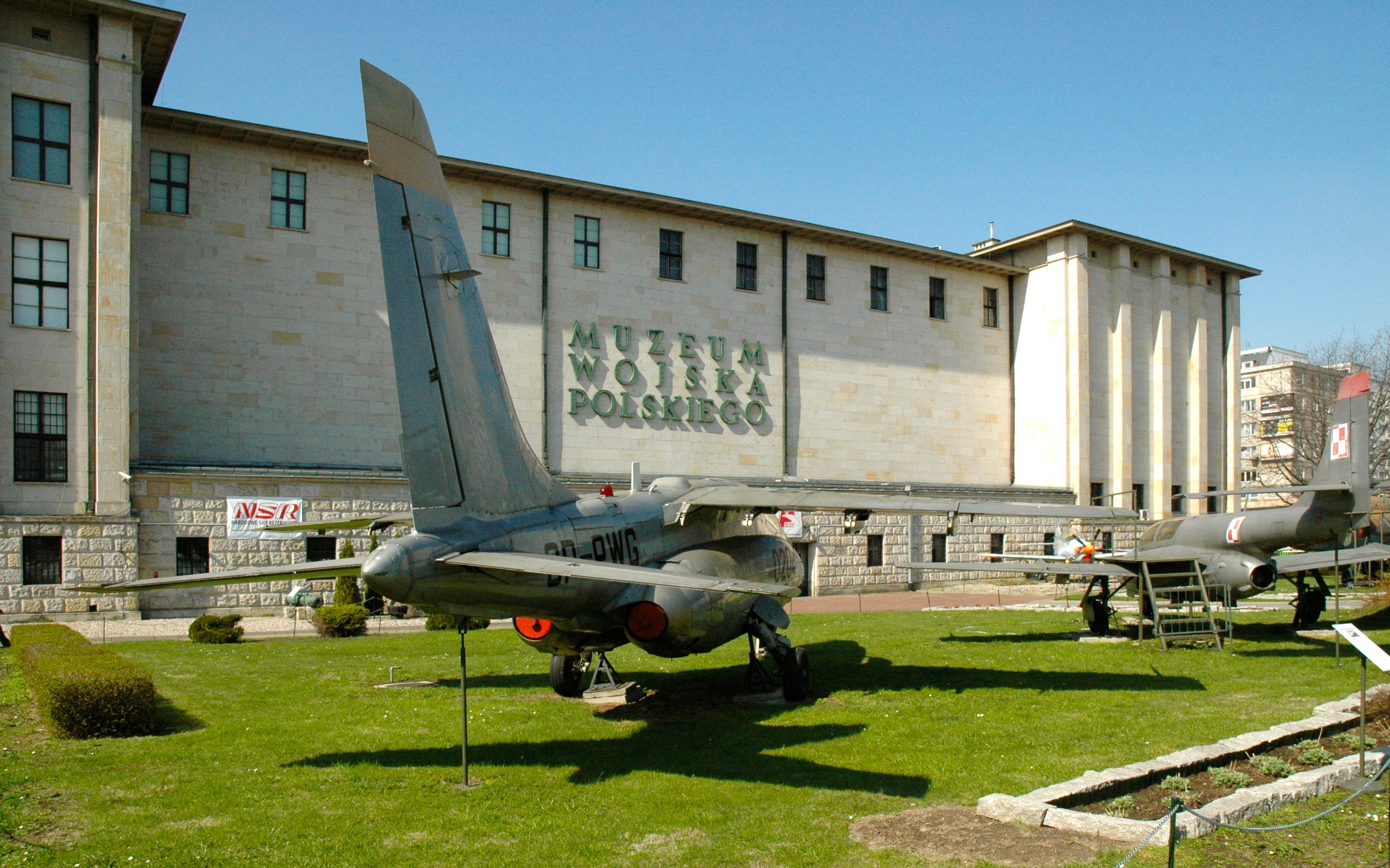
Warsaw Military Museum (former main building at Jerusalem Avenue), Warsaw

== See also ==
- List of Polish engineers
- Stanisław Olszewski
- Władysław Tryliński
- Timeline of Polish science and technology
