= Słudwia (river) =

River in Poland

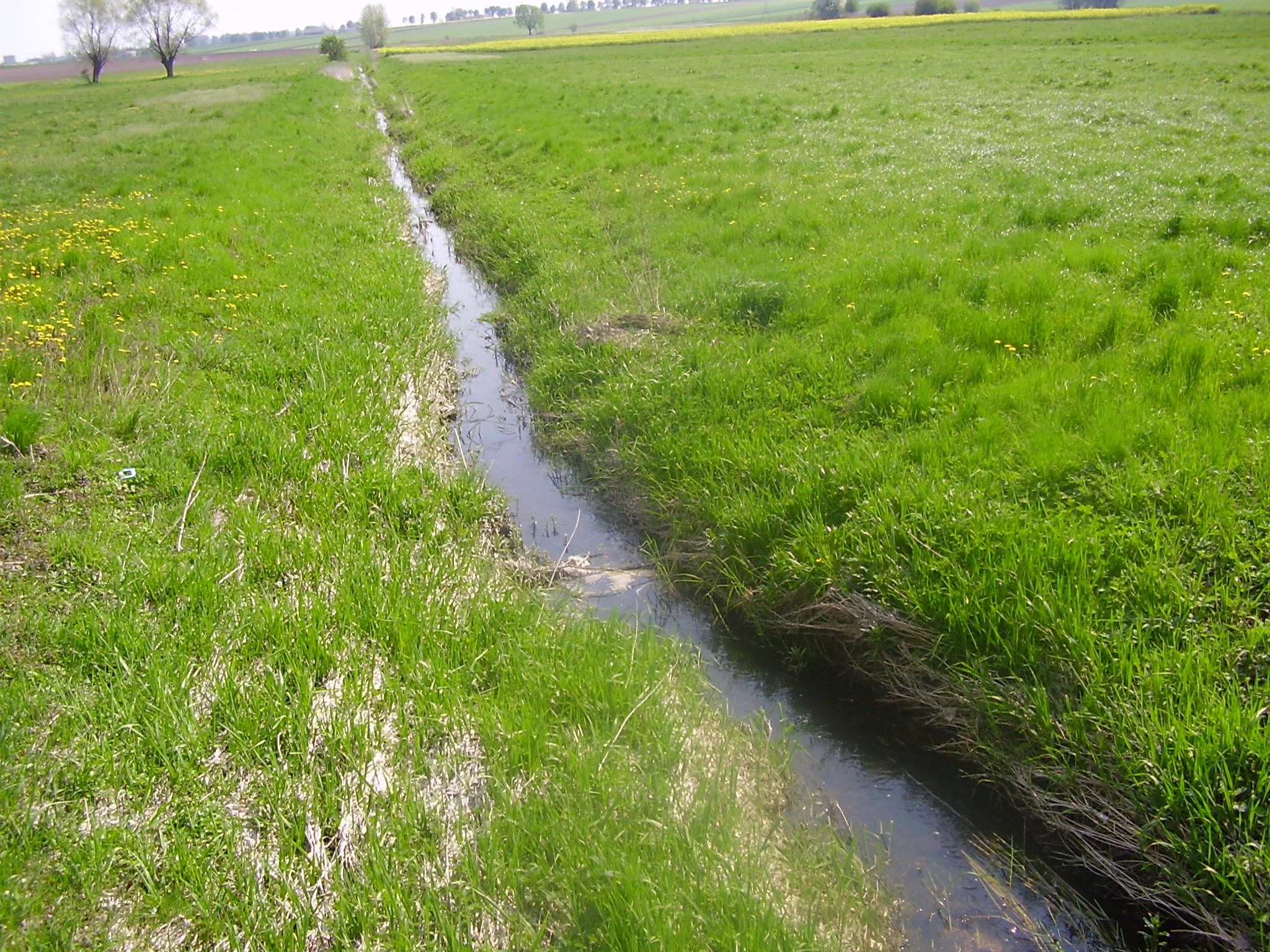
- Headwaters of the river Słudwia

Location
- Country: Poland

Physical characteristics
- Mouth
  - location: Bzura
  - coordinates: 52°07′36″N 19°54′03″E

Basin features
- Progression: Bzura→ Vistula→ Baltic Sea

Słudwia is a river in Central Poland. Its source is located near the village of Długołęka. The river flows for 46.1 kilometres (28.6 mi) through the Kutno Plains, before joining the Bzura near the town of Łowicz. Its drainage basin area is 649 square kilometres (251 mi^{2}). The river is best known for the 1928 Maurzyce Bridge built across it, the first welded road bridge in the world, designed by Stefan Bryła.
