= Maurzyce Bridge =

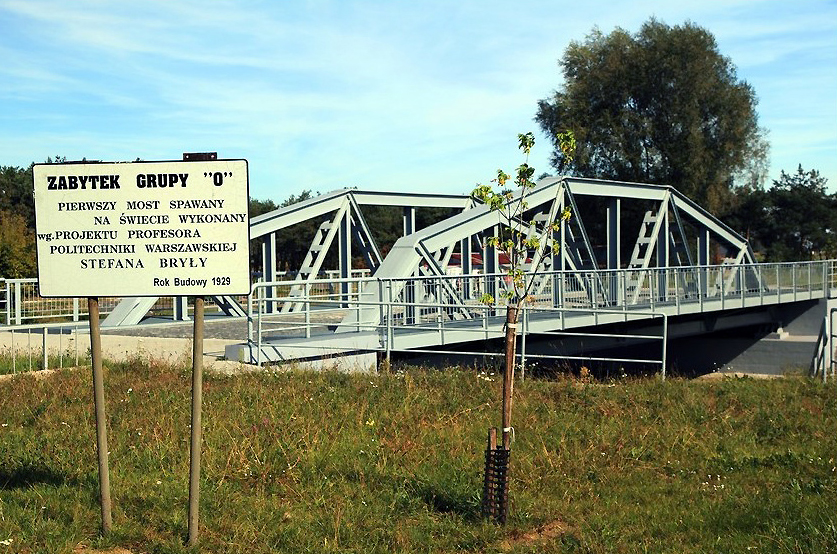
- The Maurzyce Bridge is among the most prized objects of cultural heritage in Poland
- Coordinates: 52°08′22″N 19°52′14″E
- Carries: originally 2 lanes of vehicles and pedestrians, currently pedestrian-only
- Crosses: Słudwia River
- Locale: Maurzyce near Łowicz, Poland

Characteristics
- Design: truss bridge
- Material: 370–420 MPa steel
- Total length: 27 metres (89 ft)
- Width: 6.76 metres (22.2 ft)
- Height: 4.3 metres (14 ft)

History
- Architect: Stefan Bryła
- Designer: Stefan Bryła
- Engineering design by: Stefan Bryła, Wenczesław Poniż, Władysław Tryliński
- Constructed by: K. Rudzki i S-ka
- Construction start: 1927
- Construction end: December 1928
- Inaugurated: August 1929
- Closed: 1977

Location
- Interactive map of Maurzyce Bridge

The Maurzyce Bridge (Polish: Most w Maurzycach) is a bridge over the Słudwia River (tributary of Bzura) in Central Poland. It is known as the first entirely welded road bridge and the second welded bridge of any category in the world. The bridge is located close to the village of Maurzyce near Łowicz in Łódź Voivodeship.

== History ==
=== Design ===
The bridge was designed in 1927 by Stefan Bryła, one of the pioneers of welding in civil engineering. Bryła, a professor at the Lwów University of Technology, conducted extensive theoretical studies on possible usage of welded steel joints in construction, as well as various aspects of oxy-fuel welding and electric arc welding. Both procedures have been known at least since late 19th century, but their application was mostly limited to house and shipbuilding. However, since the tests proved welded joints could be strong enough to sustain large forces, in mid-1920s Bryła decided to design a welded bridge. He used his earlier design of a riveted bridge, which Bryła and Wenczesław Poniż converted to use the new construction method. However, the cross-beams and some elements of the chords were re-designed from scratch. Although designed first, the bridge was the second such bridge constructed; a similar yet shorter welded railway bridge was designed and build a few months earlier in Turtle Creek, Pennsylvania by Westinghouse Electric and Manufacturing and holds the record for the first welded bridge of any type in the world.

The then-new technique of arc welding allowed considerable weight savings: its overall weight is 56 metric tons, while a riveted version would have weighed over 70 tons. Apart from construction method, the construction itself is an ordinary truss bridge with two main truss beams, a straight bottom chord and a parabolic top chord. In addition to two lanes for road traffic, the bridge also includes two side-walks for pedestrians.

=== Construction ===
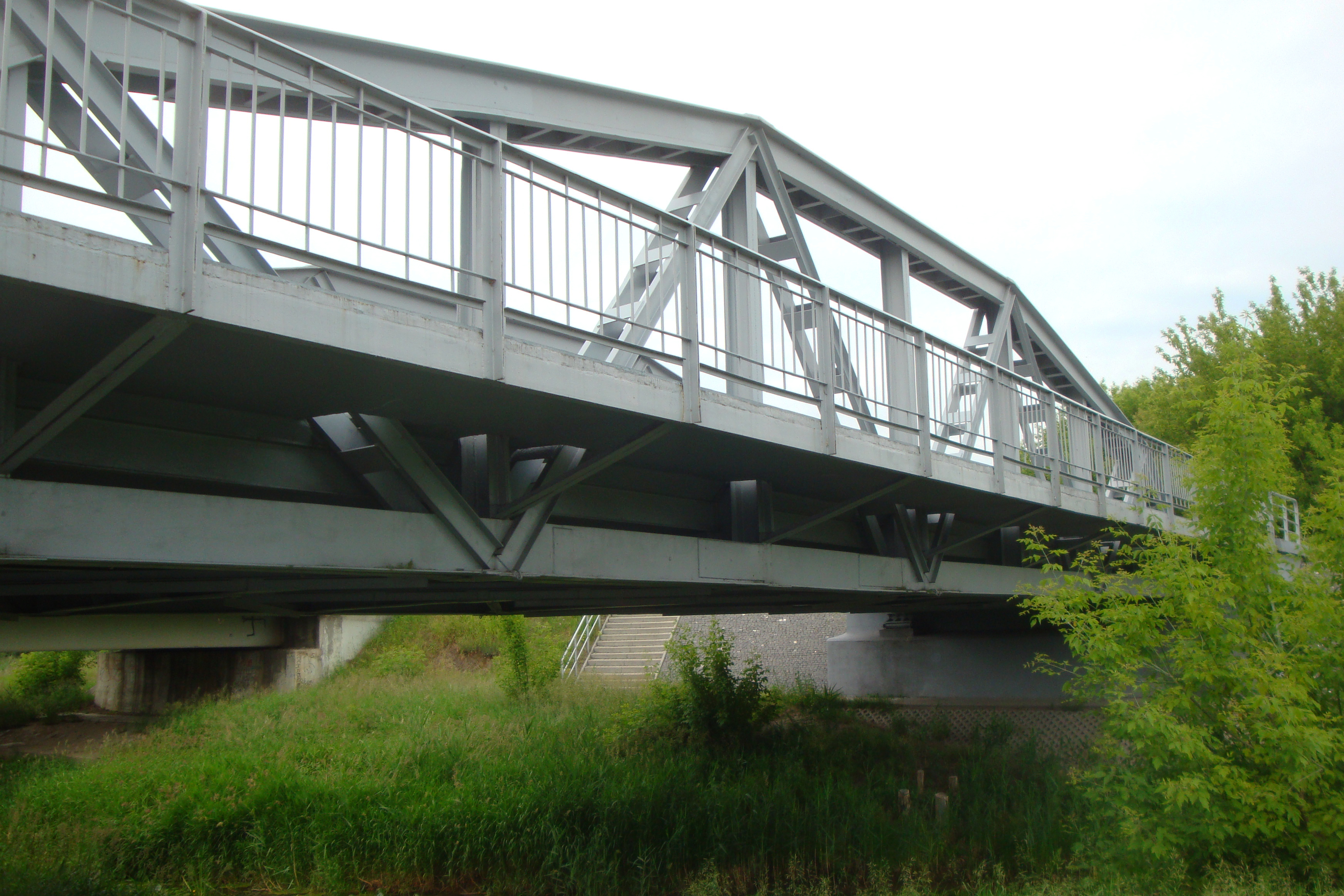
Ground level view

As the task of building such a structure was considered extremely risky, the K. Rudzki i S-ka Company was chosen as the main contractor, fabricator and builder. The company with its seat in Warsaw and a large factory in Mińsk Mazowiecki was among the most experienced bridge building companies in Central and Eastern Europe at the time. Established in 1853, in late 19th and early 20th century the company was the only firm in the entire Russian Empire to construct difficult bridges in remote locations. Almost 20% of all bridges constructed in Russia in that period were built by Konstanty Rudzki and his engineers. Altogether in the first two decades of 20th century the company built 5,000 metres of steel road bridges and 24,000 metres of various rail bridges for 37 different railway companies, in addition to providing them with a net of over 2 million metres of water pipelines. Among the steel bridges constructed by K. Rudzki were Warsaw's Poniatowski Bridge, but also most of Trans-Siberian Railway's river crossings, including the 1916 Khabarovsk Bridge (at over 2,500 metres of length for decades the longest bridge in Euro-Asia). The company also built bridges for the Saint Petersburg–Warsaw Railway, Amur Railway, Ussuri Railway and Chinese Eastern Railway, among others. Yet, even with such experience, the construction of the bridge across Słudwia near Łowicz proved to be a difficult task.

The elements were manufactured by the K. Rudzki i S-ka factory in Mińsk Mazowiecki and then welded into place on the spot. It was completed in December 1928 and opened to normal road traffic in August of the following year. Despite welding being much more expensive than time-consuming riveting, the overall bridge cost was much lower, in large part due to 17% less steel needed to build it and shorter construction time.

=== Later history ===
Revolutionary at the time, the completion of the Maurzyce Bridge sparked a new era in bridge construction worldwide. The construction was described in European and American engineering press, and engineers from around the world visited the new bridge in large numbers. Consequently, Poland was the first country in the world to regulate the construction of welded bridges.

Until the late 1970s the bridge was used by National road 2, the Polish section of the European route E8. However, as it proved too narrow, in 1977 it was moved some 20 metres to the north, closed to traffic, and a new replacement was built in its place.

The bridge was inscribed on the list of objects of cultural heritage in Poland on 22 November 1968 by the Monument Documentation Authority (predecessor to the National Heritage Board), and initially (until that category was abolished in 1973) it was listed among the "Grade Zero monuments" (Polish: zabytek klasy 0), that is the most prized historical monuments of international significance. Later it was re-classified as an "unmovable historical monument".

The bridge was refurbished in 2009. At the cost of 800,000 zł the steel construction was cleaned of rust and repainted silver, and the road surface was replaced with a granite sett. In 2011 a memorial plaque to professor Bryła was unveiled in front of it.

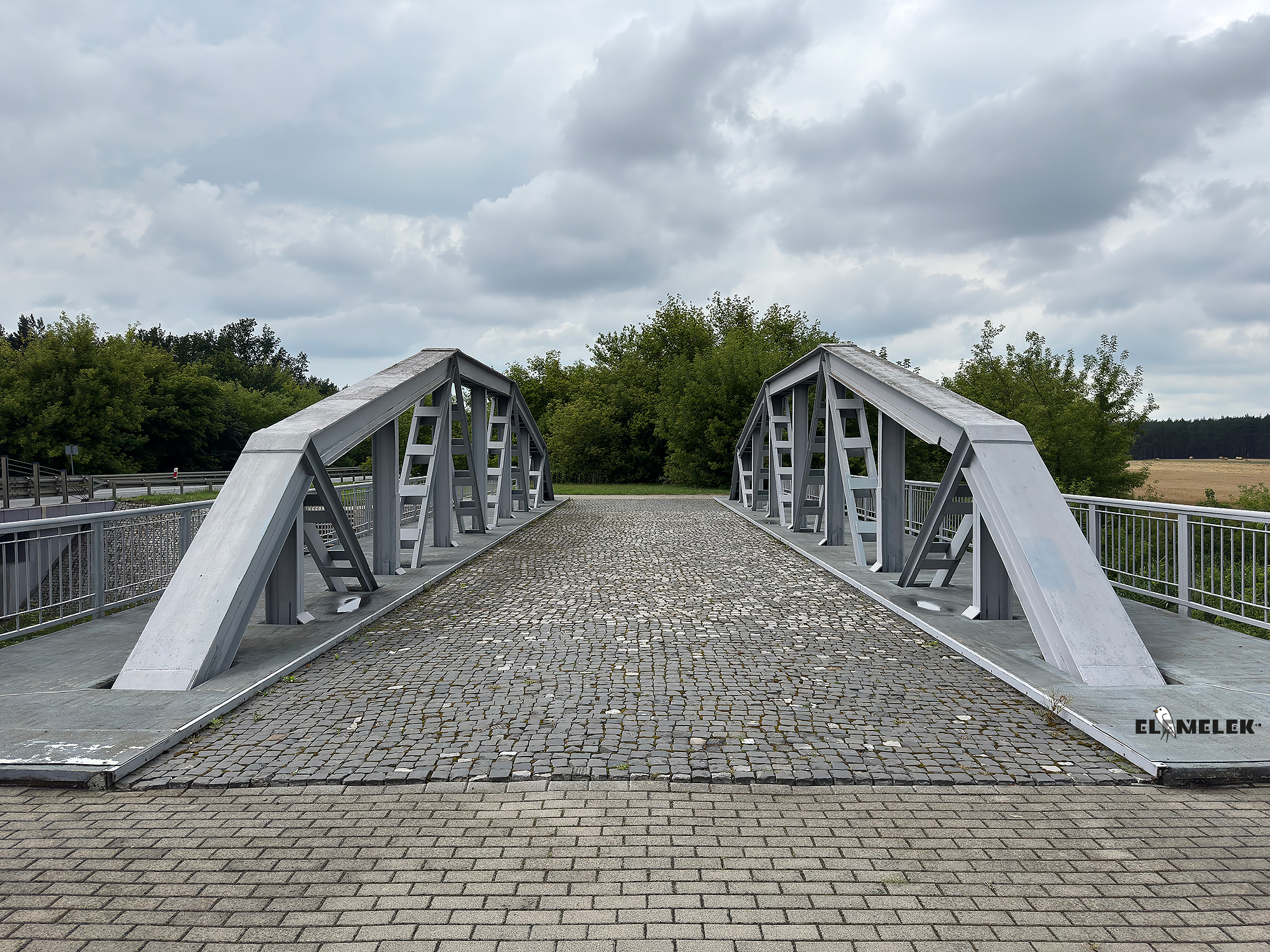
Front view

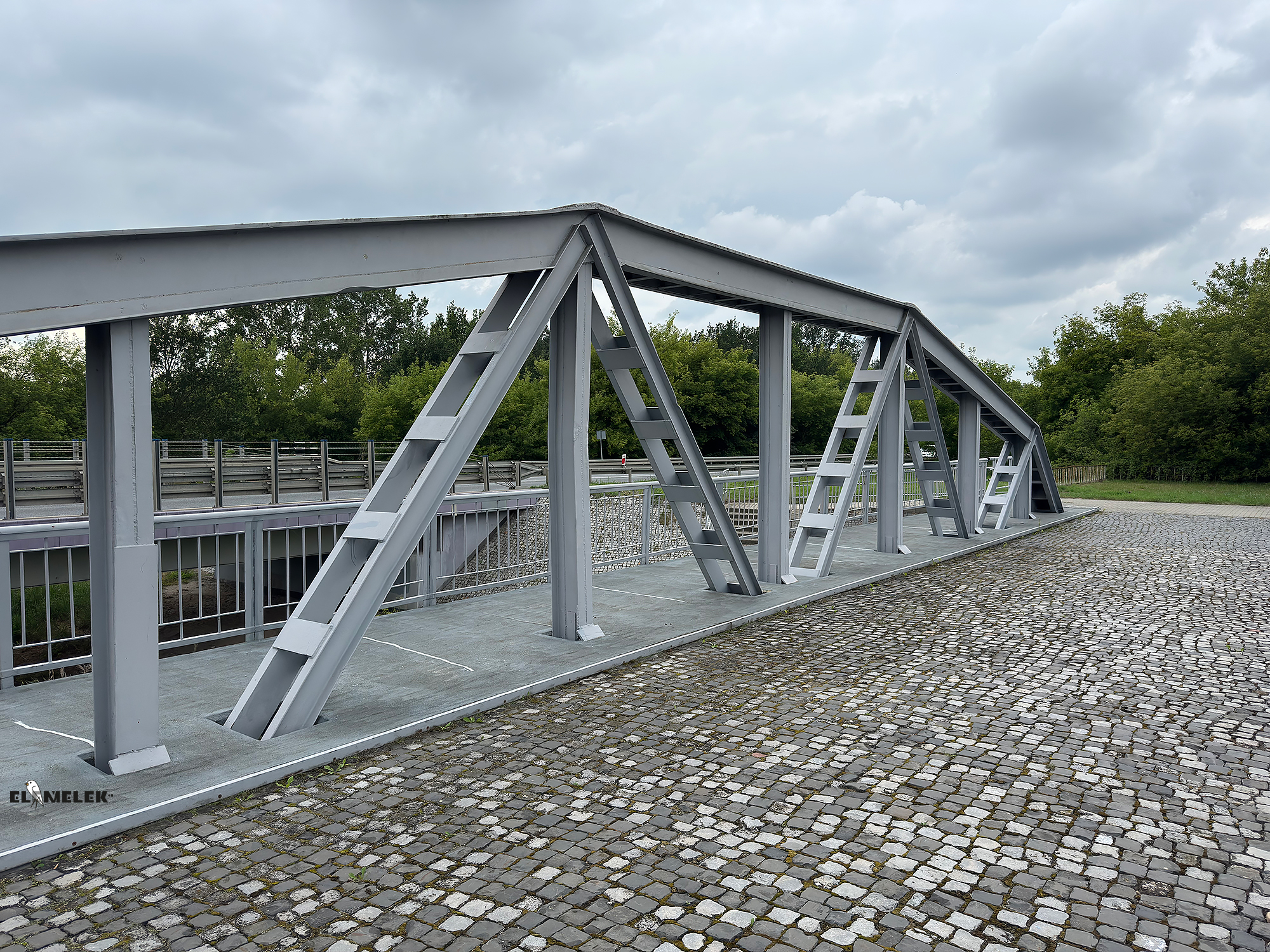
Side view

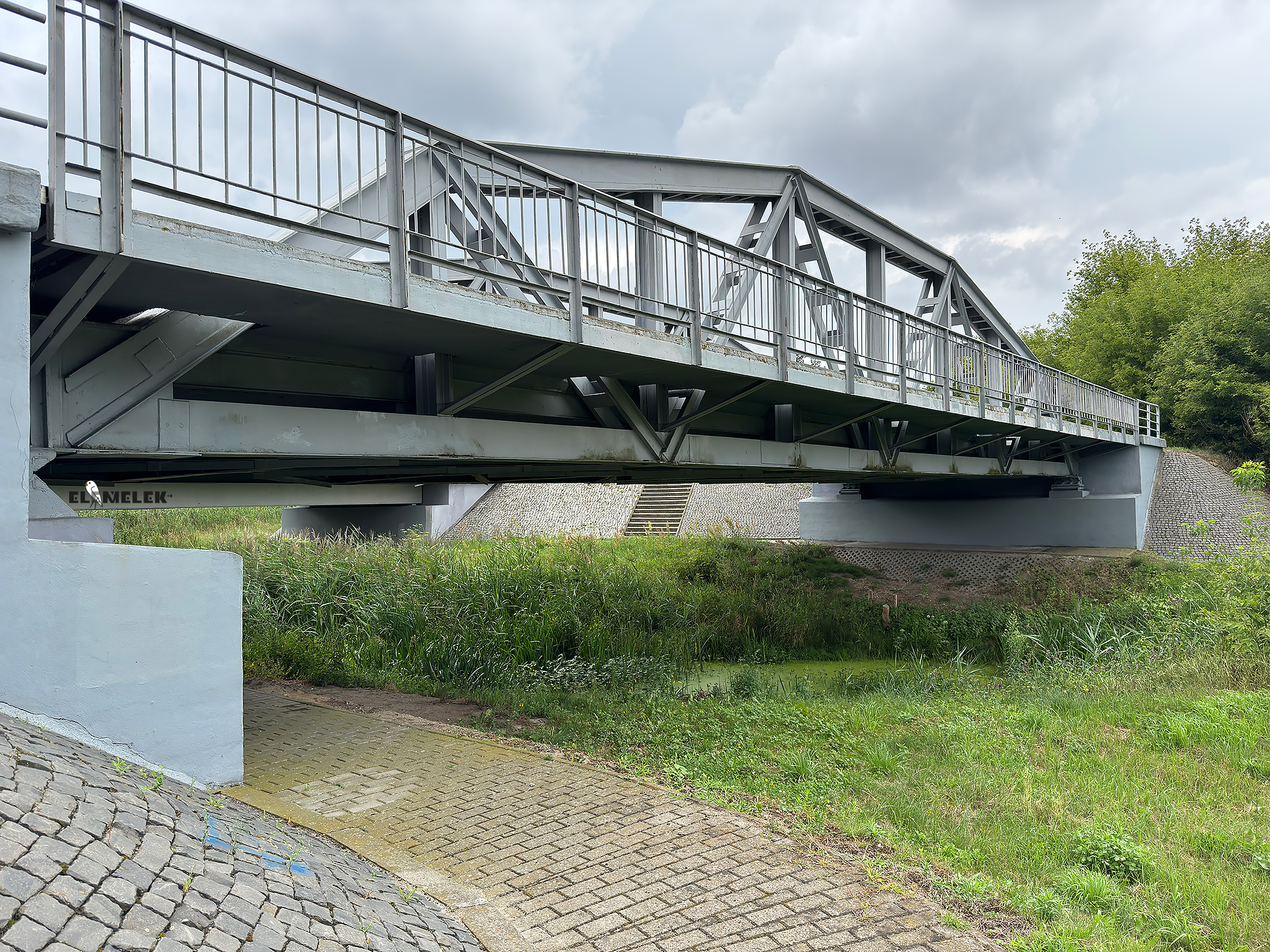
View from below

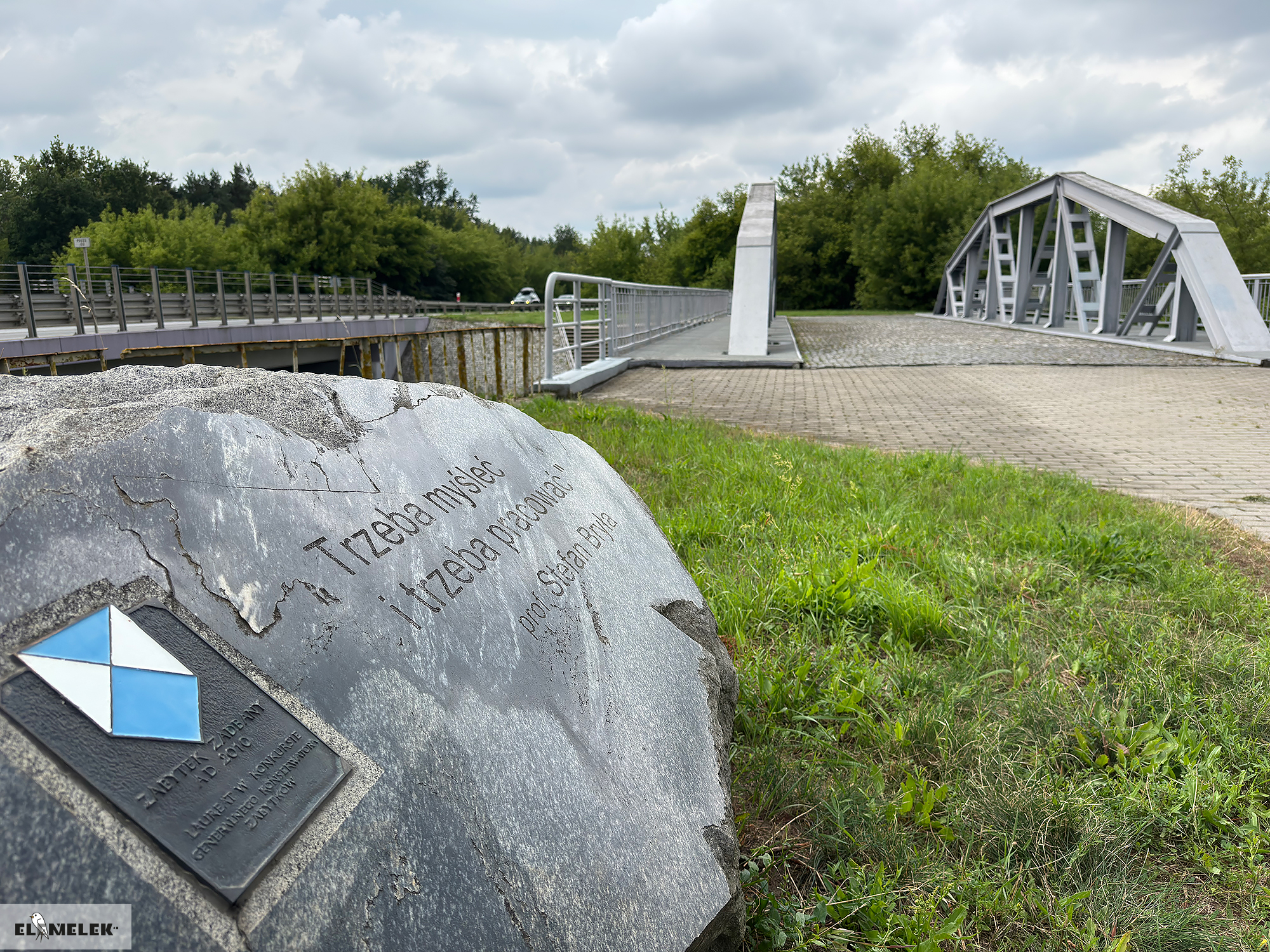
Memorial stone
