= Maurzyce =

- Village
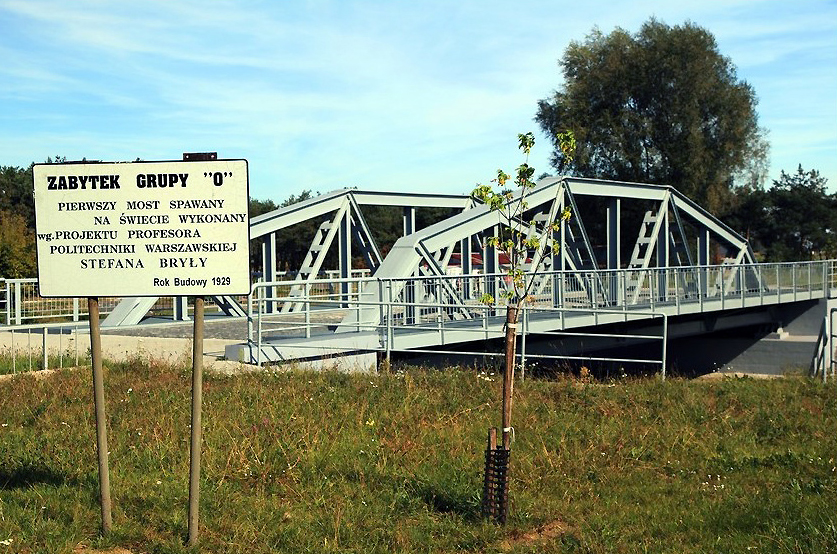
- Maurzyce Bridge

- Location within Poland
- Coordinates: 52°8′5″N 19°51′12″E
- Country: Poland
- Voivodeship: Łódź
- County: Łowicz
- Gmina: Zduny

Population
  - Total: 214

Maurzyce [mauˈʐɨt͡sɛ] is a village in the administrative district of Gmina Zduny, within Łowicz County, Łódź Voivodeship, in central Poland.

The village is the location of the eponymous Maurzyce Bridge, the first welded road bridge in the world.
