= Warsaw Insurgents Square =

Square in Warsaw, Poland

Coordinates: 52°14′9″N 21°00′47″E

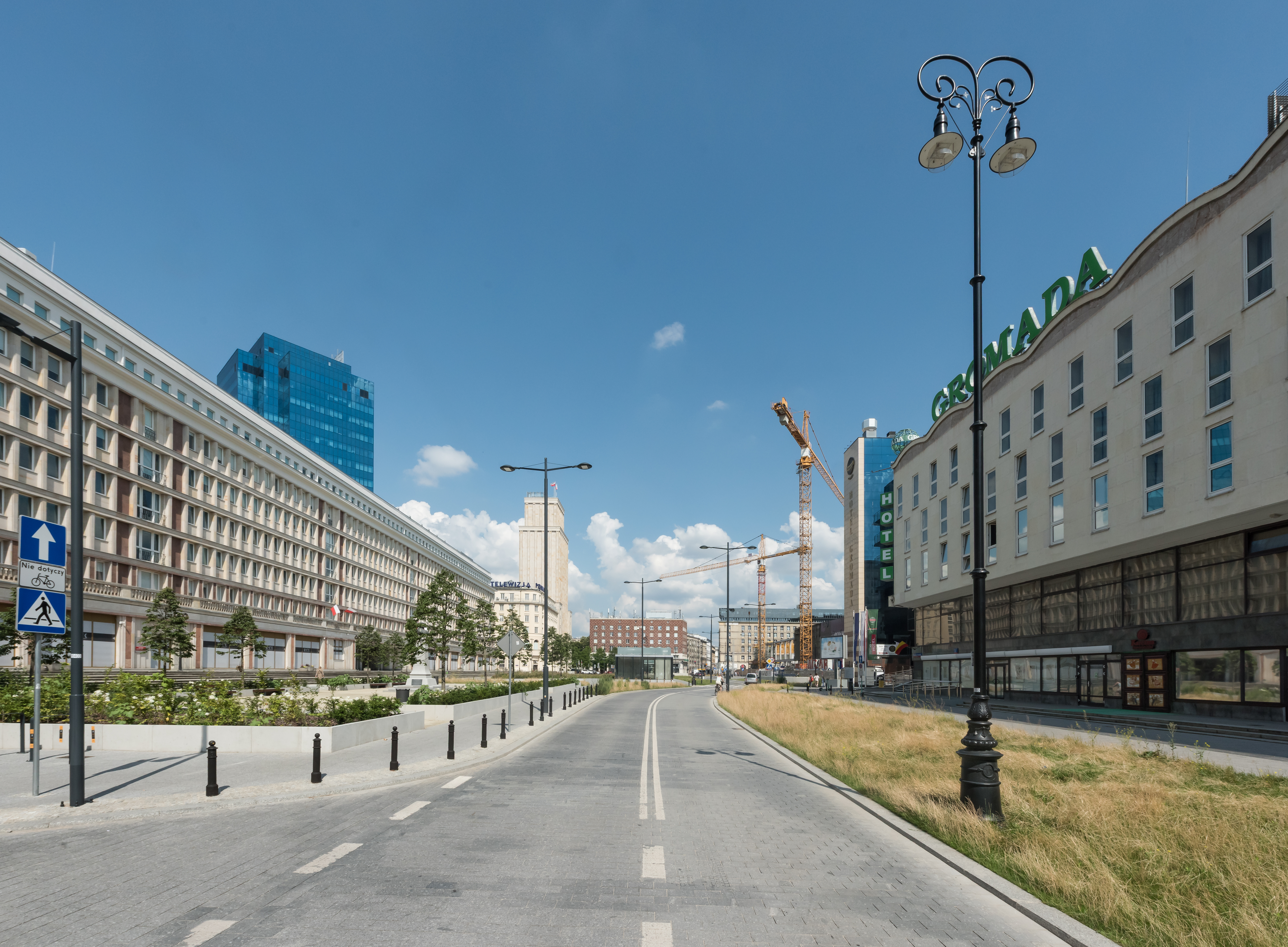
Warsaw Insurgents Square; view to the north

Warsaw Insurgents Square (Polish: Plac Powstańców Warszawy), still popularly known by its former name Napoleon Square (Plac Napoleona), is a square in the Śródmieście district of Warsaw.

Located at the junction of ulica Świętokrzyska (Holy Cross Street) and ulica Szpitalna (Hospital Street) and near Nowy Świat (New World Street), it is one of Warsaw's central squares. Historically, the area was called Plac Warecki during the times of the Polish–Lithuanian Commonwealth and then Plac Napoleona under the Second Polish Republic. Most of the Square's buildings were destroyed in the 1944 Warsaw Uprising, and the Square is now notable for only two landmarks: the seat of the Polish National Bank (which Varsovians irreverently call "trumna" — "the coffin"), and the former Prudential building, which was the second skyscraper to be built in Warsaw and the tallest until the 1950s.

== History ==
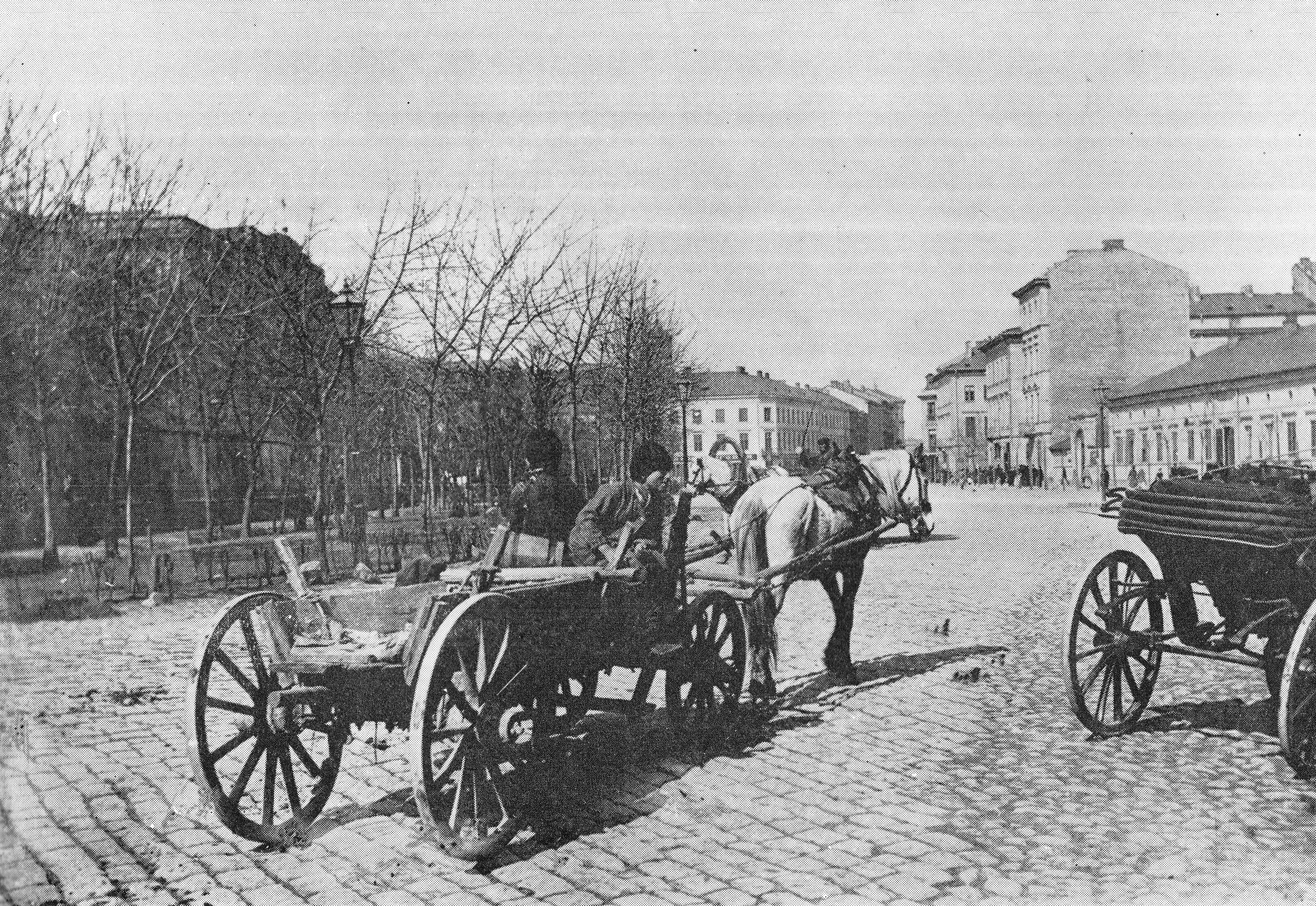
Warecki Square around 1892

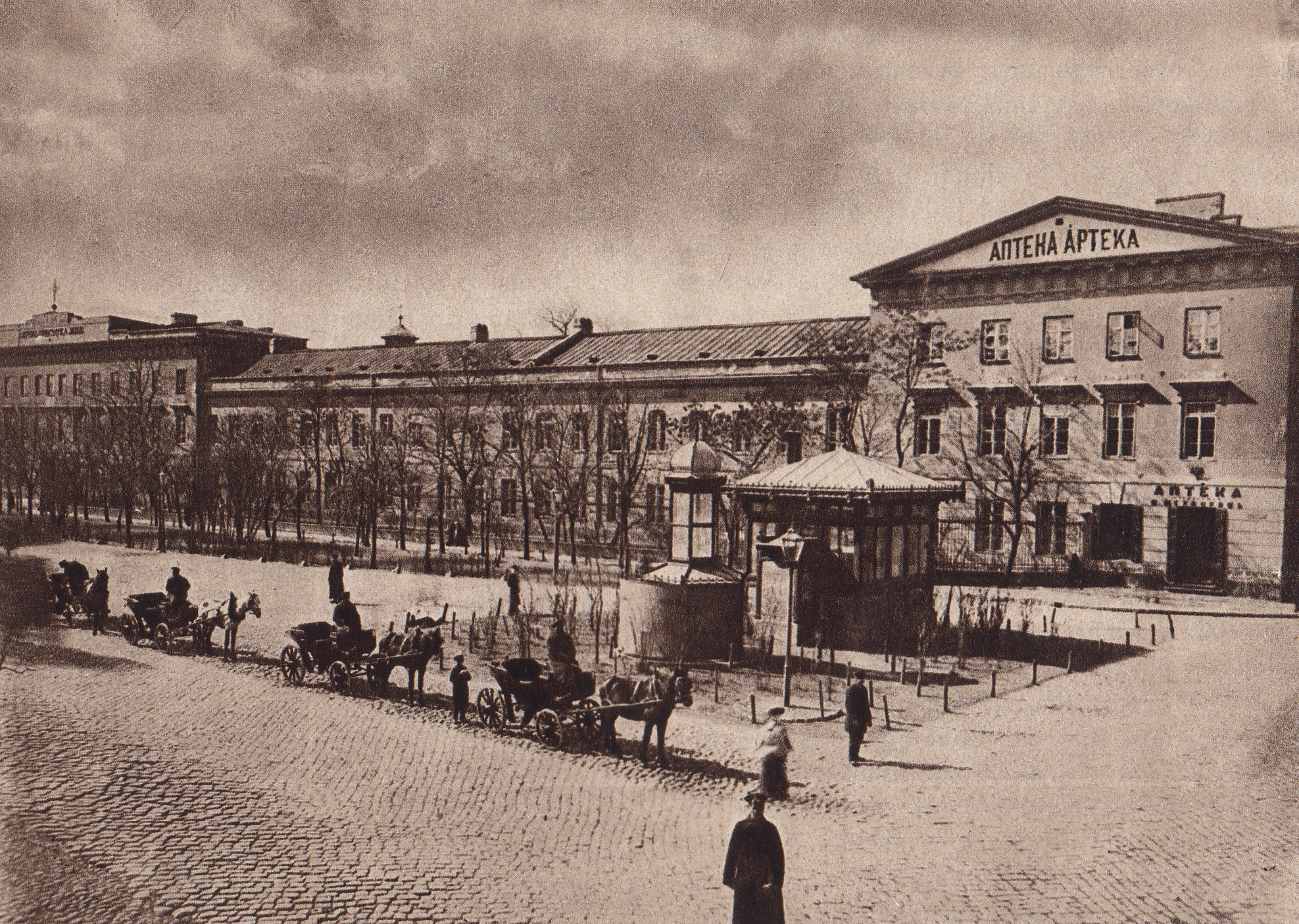
The Infant Jesus Hospital Complex at Warecki Square, ca. 1900

The rectangular square was laid out between 1823 and 1826 on the site of existing gardens located between Szpitalna, Mazowiecka, Świętokrzyska, and Warecka Streets, as well as the present-day (opened in 1902) Nowosienna (now Sienkiewicza) and Moniuszki Streets. In 1839, it was given the name plac Dzieciątka Jezus (Infant Jesus Square), derived from the Hospital of the Infant Jesus, which had stood there since 1758. The monumental main hospital building, measuring 220 meters in length, occupied the area between Świętokrzyska Street and the present-day Boduena Street, and a cemetery was also established next to the hospital.

In 1828, a two-story tenement house belonging to Karol Fryderyk Minter was completed by the square. Adjacent to it was a factory producing metal household and artistic goods. Around 1865, the factory was relocated to Smolna Street, and the Postal Directorate moved into the former Minter house. On the neighboring plot, where the hospital's former funeral house and hearse depot had stood, a postal station began operating around 1862, complete with large stables, workshops, and housing for postilions.

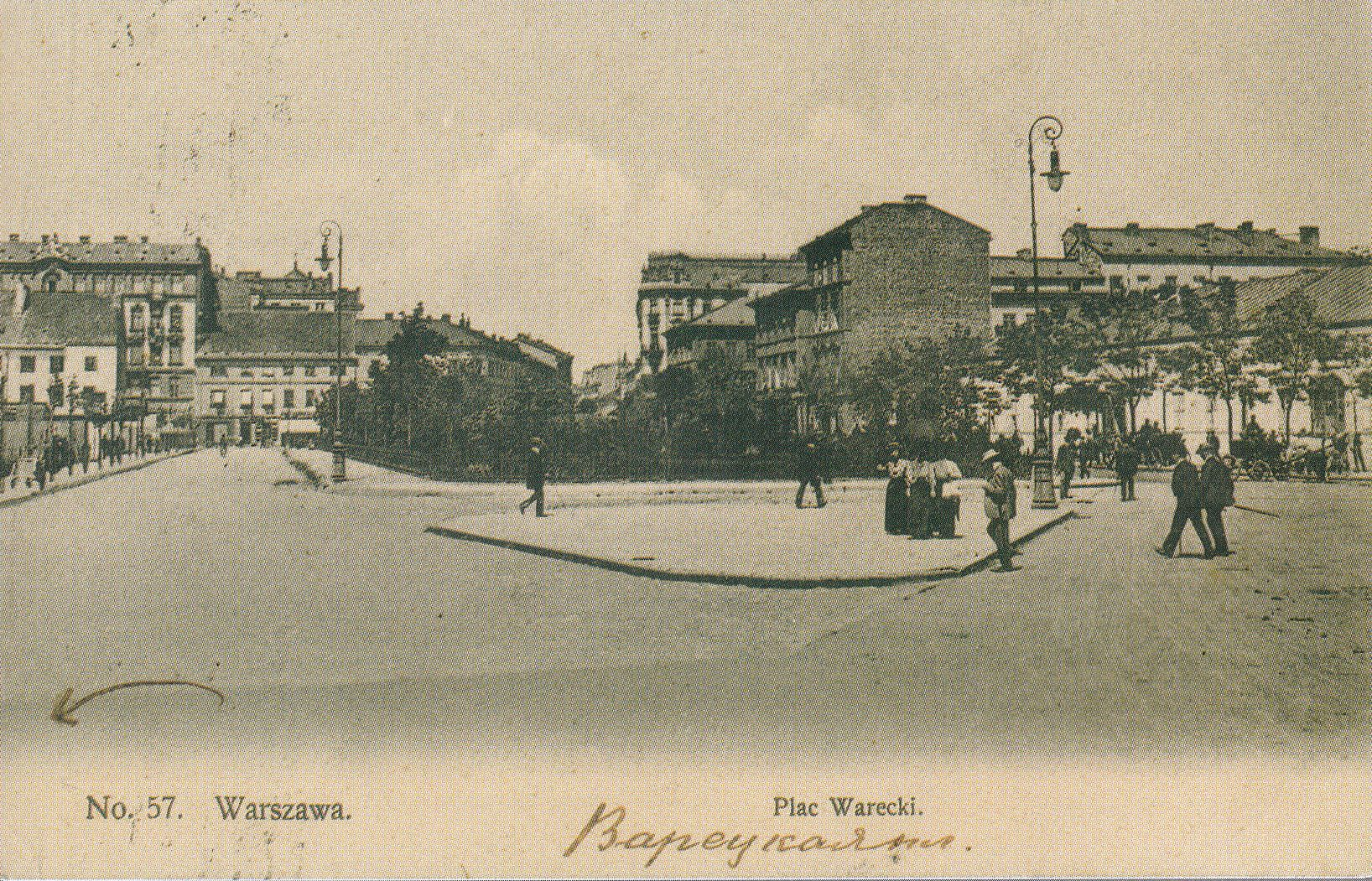
Square around 1908

Around 1870, the square was renamed Warecki Square, as it was located on land owned by Józef Pułaski, the starosta of Warka. In 1901, the Hospital of the Infant Jesus was relocated to a new complex built between 1897 and 1901 on the grounds of the former Świętokrzyski Manor, near Nowogrodzka Street. The post-hospital area was divided into plots, and rental tenement houses began to be erected there. The square was paved and landscaped, and a new garden was established. Between 1912 and 1916, the postal station was replaced with the monumental General Post Office building. During the interwar period, the building also housed the Ministry of Posts and Telegraphs (address: 16 Warecka Street).

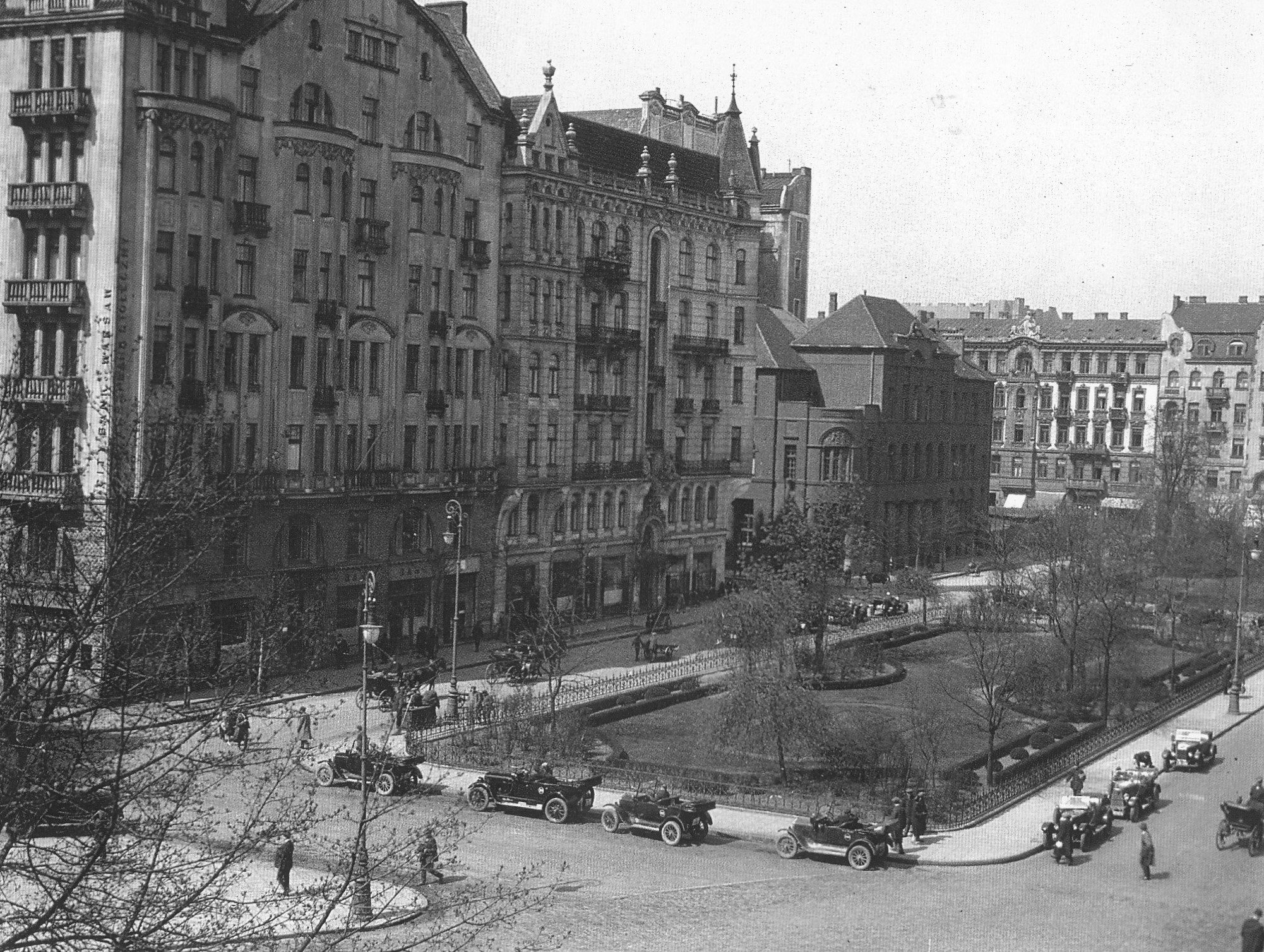
Napoleon Square around 1928 - 1931

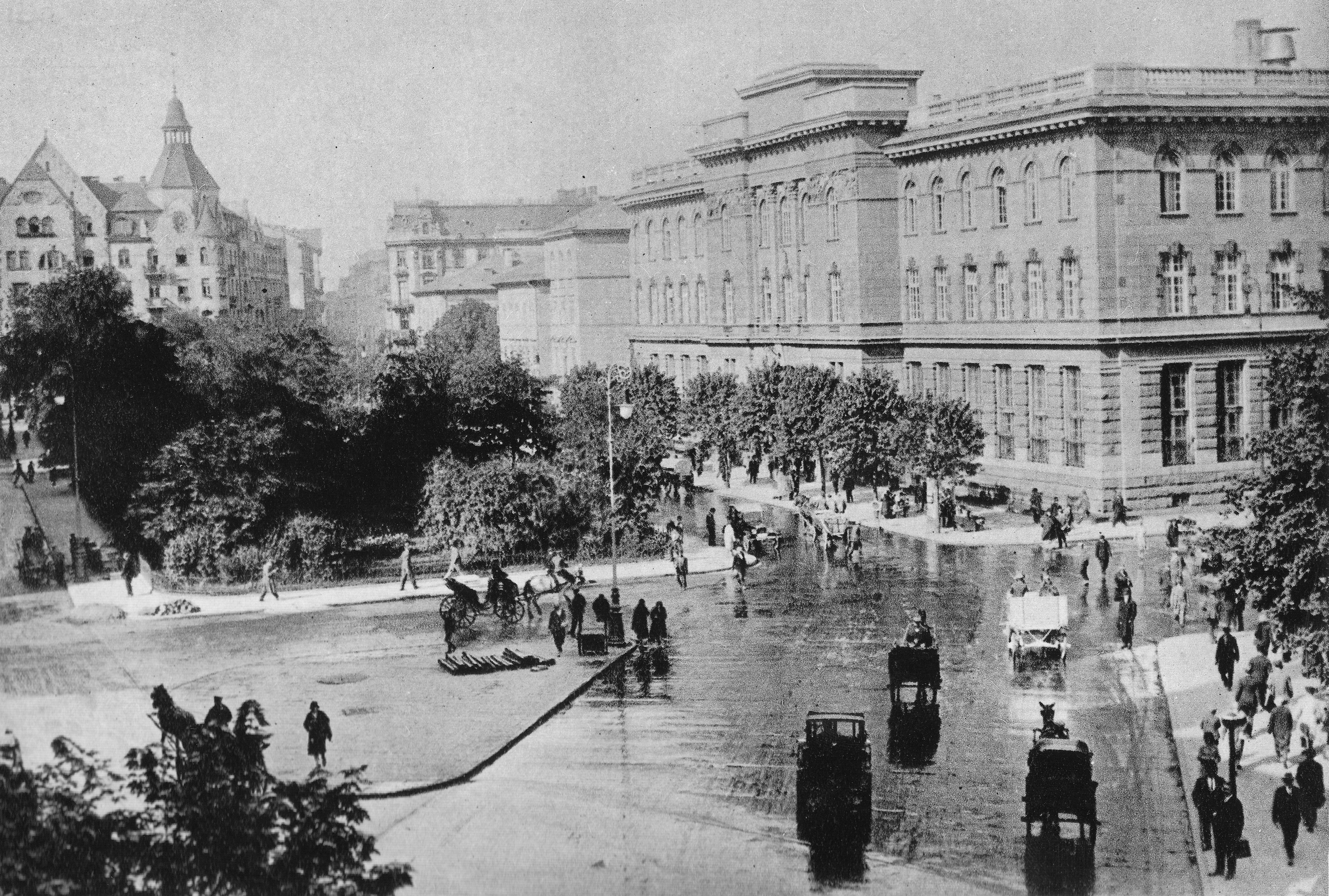
The square in the interwar period, on the right the Main Post Office building

The square was initially intended as the original site for the monument to Frédéric Chopin. In 1921, on the 100th anniversary of Napoleon Bonaparte's death, it was renamed Napoleon Square (plac Napoleona), and a monument to Bonaparte was erected there (later dismantled). The monument was reinstalled in 2011.

Between 1931 and 1933, the Prudential Insurance Company skyscraper—a 16-story, 66-meter-tall building, Poland's first high-rise—was constructed on the square.

The square's buildings suffered heavy damage during the siege of Warsaw in September 1939. A temporary cemetery was created there; the graves were removed by order of the German occupation authorities in November 1939. In May 1940, the Germans renamed the square Postplatz.

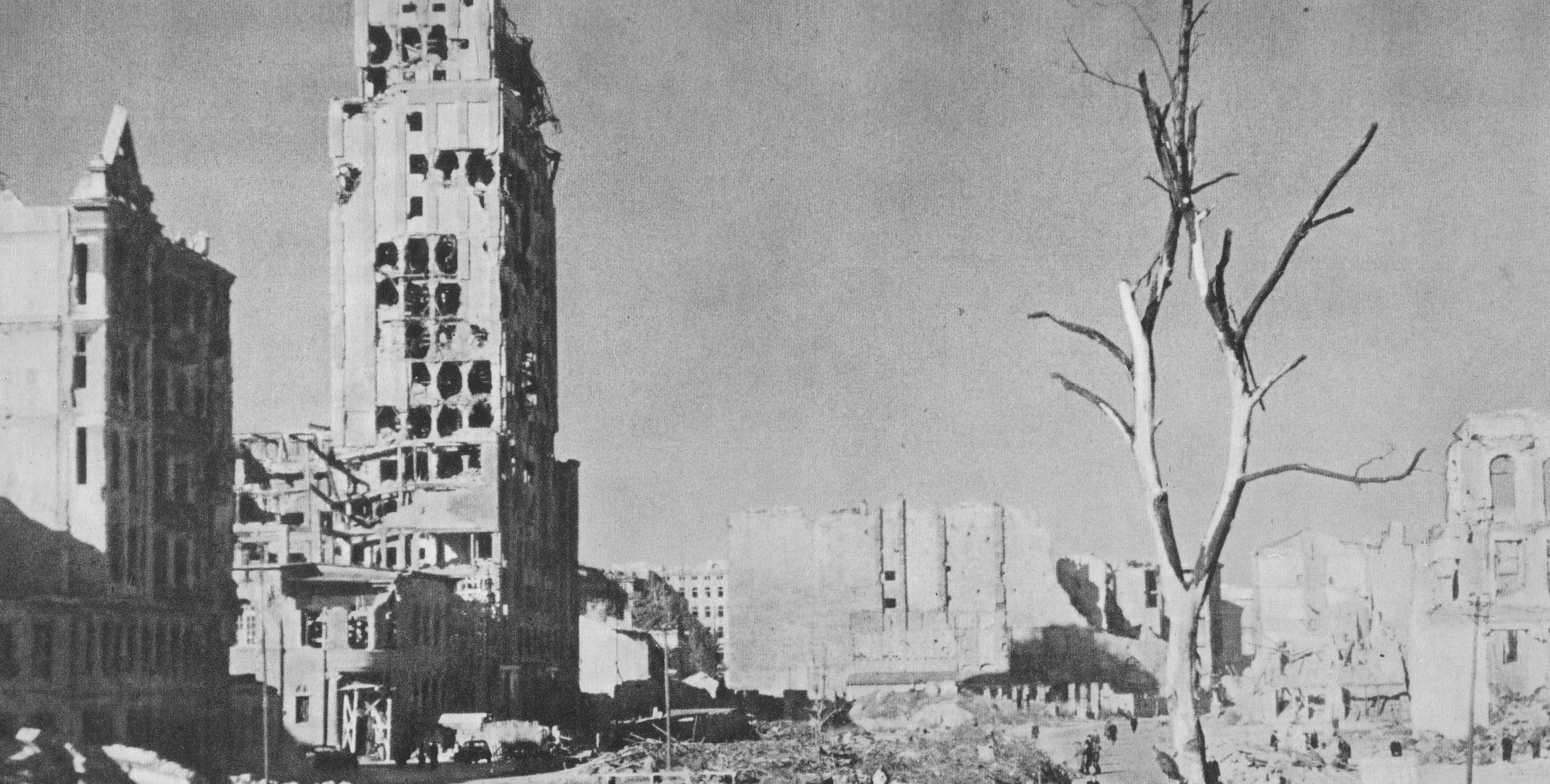
The square in 1945

During the Warsaw Uprising of 1944, fighting at the square began around 4:00 p.m., an hour before “W Hour.” The Prudential building was seized by insurgents and held until the end of the uprising. From its windows, they fired on the General Post Office, occupied by the Germans, which was captured on August 2. As the tallest building in Warsaw, the Prudential was heavily damaged by bombing and artillery fire—on August 28, it was hit by a 2-ton, 600-mm shell from a Karl-Gerät self-propelled mortar.

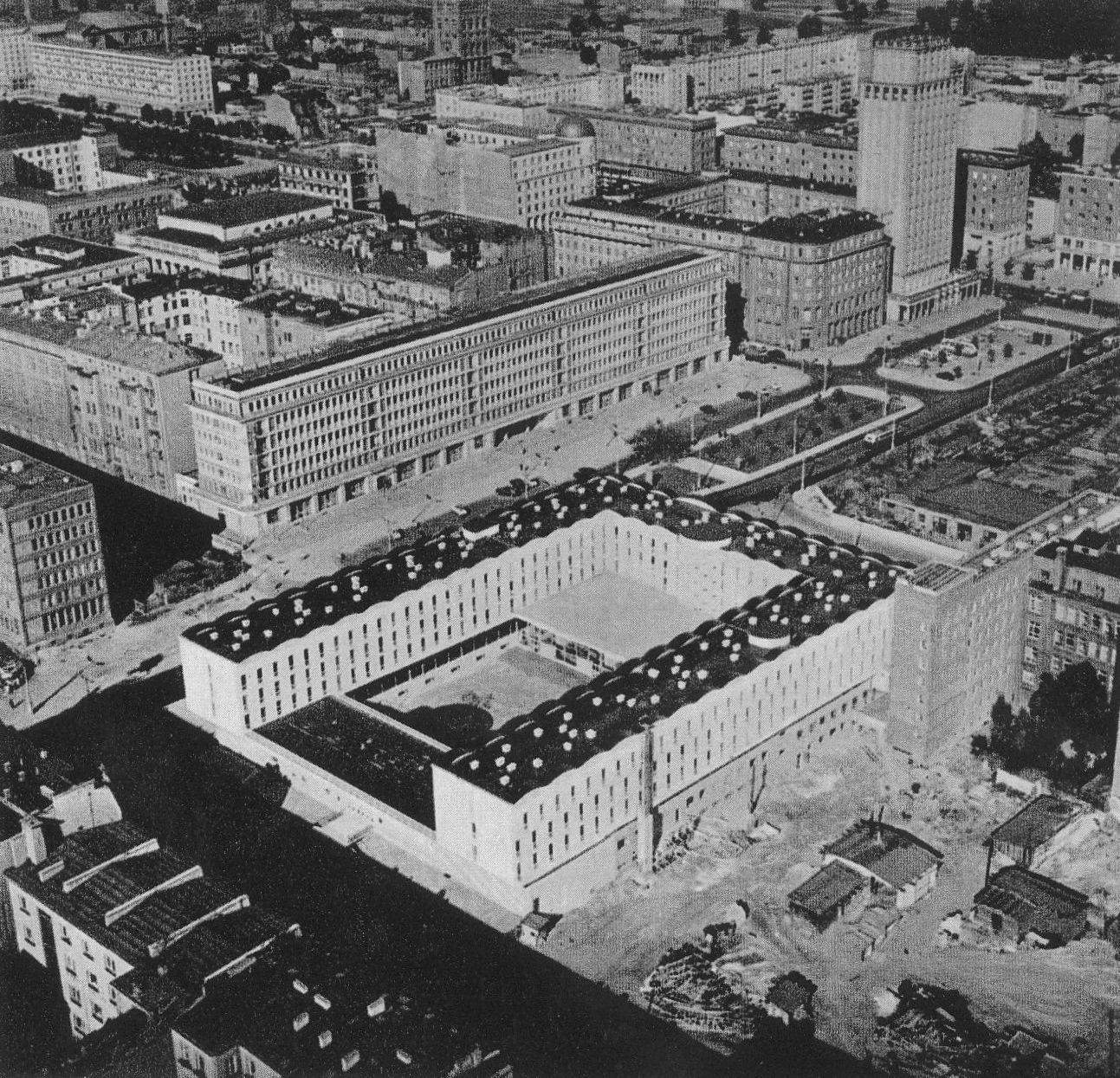
The square in the 1960s, with the Peasant's House in the foreground

After 1945, only the Prudential building was rebuilt in its pre-war form; it later became the Hotel Warszawa (operating intermittently between 2002 and 2018). A trolleybus line was routed through the square. In the 1950s, on the site of the destroyed General Post Office, construction began on the National Bank of Poland complex. By a resolution of the Warsaw National Council on September 27, 1957, the square was renamed Warsaw Uprising Square.

In 1979, a memorial plaque was unveiled in the square, commemorating the battles of the “Kiliński” Battalion during the Warsaw Uprising.

In 2012, a ventilation shaft for the M2 metro line, running under Świętokrzyska Street, was constructed beneath the square. During excavation, a 600-mm Karl-Gerät shell, identical to the one that had struck the Prudential in 1944, was discovered.

In 2014, to mark the 70th anniversary of the Warsaw Uprising, the square's surface was renovated. Another modernization followed in 2017, which included removing large colorful planters installed in 2014 and planting 25 silver linden trees.

In 2022, construction began on a four-level underground parking garage beneath the square, offering 420 parking spaces. The garage was opened in March 2025.
