= Intraco =

Intraco I
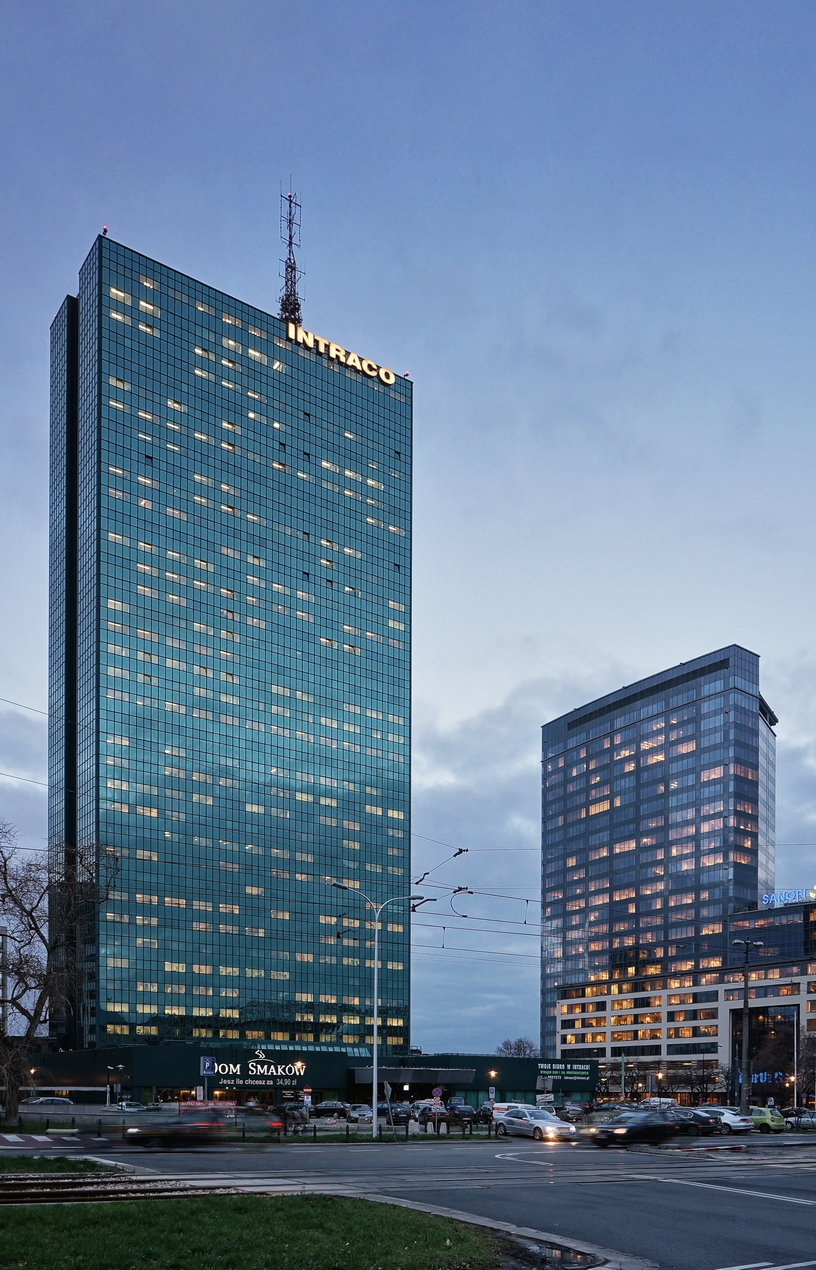
- Intraco I (left) and North Gate
- Interactive map of the Intraco I area

General information
- Status: Completed
- Type: High-Rise
- Location: Ulica Stawki 2, Warsaw, Poland
- Coordinates: 52°15′16″N 20°59′48″E
- Completed: 1975
- Owner: Polski Holding Nieruchomości

Height
- Height: 138 m (453 ft)
- Antenna spire: 31 m (102 ft)
- Roof: 107 m (351 ft)

Technical details
- Floor count: 39
- Floor area: 32,000 m^{2} (344,445 sq ft)

Design and construction
- Architect: BPA AB

Other information
- Parking: 200 cars

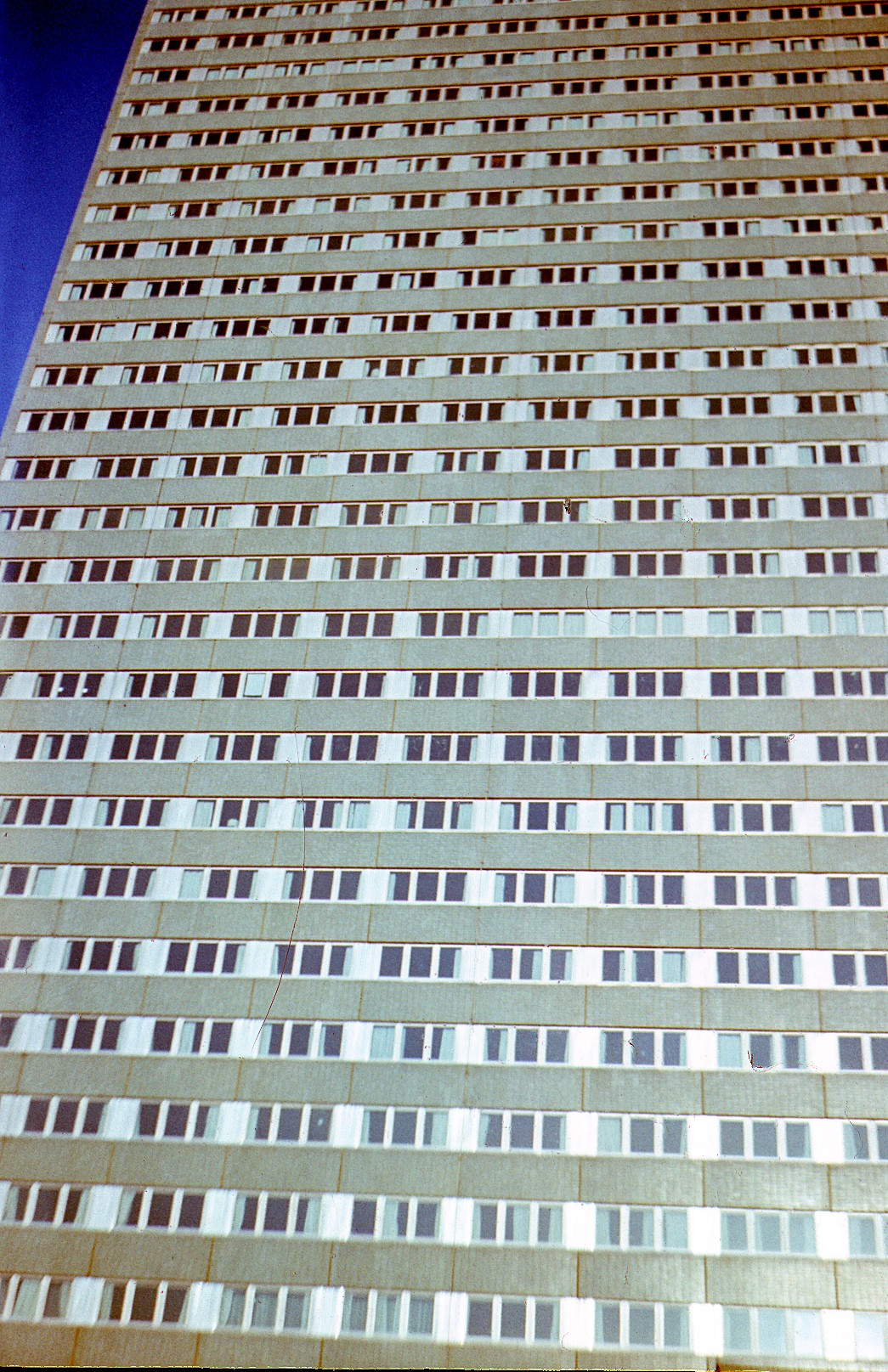
Original elevation of the building, 1970s

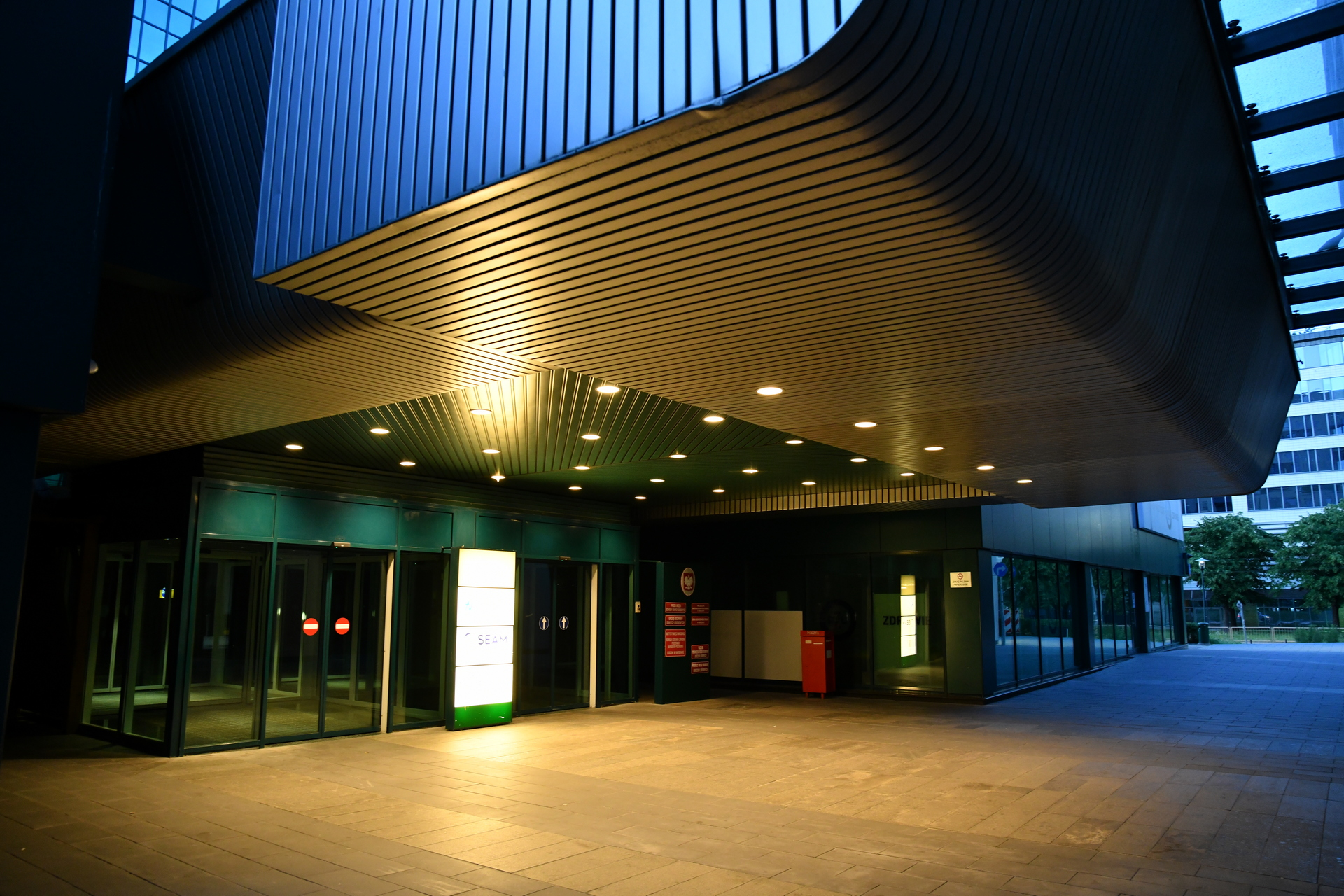
Intraco I building canopy entrance

Intraco I is a skyscraper in Warsaw, by Swedish company Byggnadsproduktion AB. The skyscraper is located at Stawki street, at the border of two districts Śródmieście and Żoliborz, close to the Dworzec Gdański metro and train station. The total height of the building, including its antenna is 138 metres. The building has 39 stories with a total area of 31500 square metres.

The elevation of the building was completely refurbished in 1998 and it has changed the colour of the curtain wall from grey-blue (which was originally coated with ceramic tiles) to light green/cyan.

Intraco I is a typical high-rise office building. The building also has an underground car park for 200 cars. Offices in the building occupy all floors. Inside the building there are also two restaurants, many conference rooms, a bar and kiosk, other miscellaneous stores, and a spa and sauna.

In June 2025, Polski Holding Nieruchomości, due to the lack of possibilities to modernize the building, announced its intention to demolish Intraco and build a new skyscraper in its place. The new tower is to refer stylistically to the original, with a similar height.

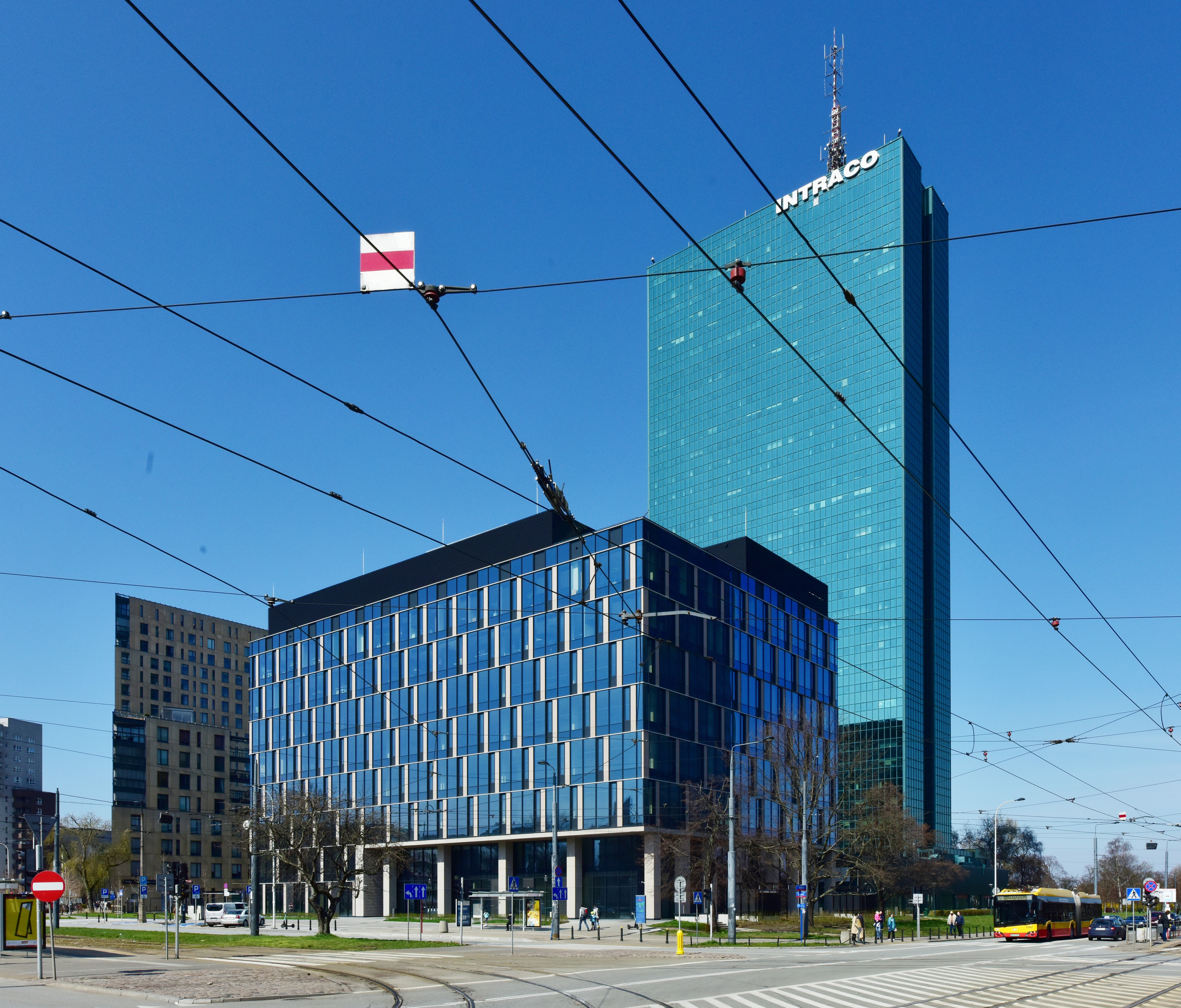
Intraco and Intraco Prime (2023)

== See also ==
- List of tallest buildings in Warsaw
- North gate
- Dworzec Gdański metro station
- Warszawa Gdańska station
