= Skysawa =

Skyscraper in Warsaw, Poland

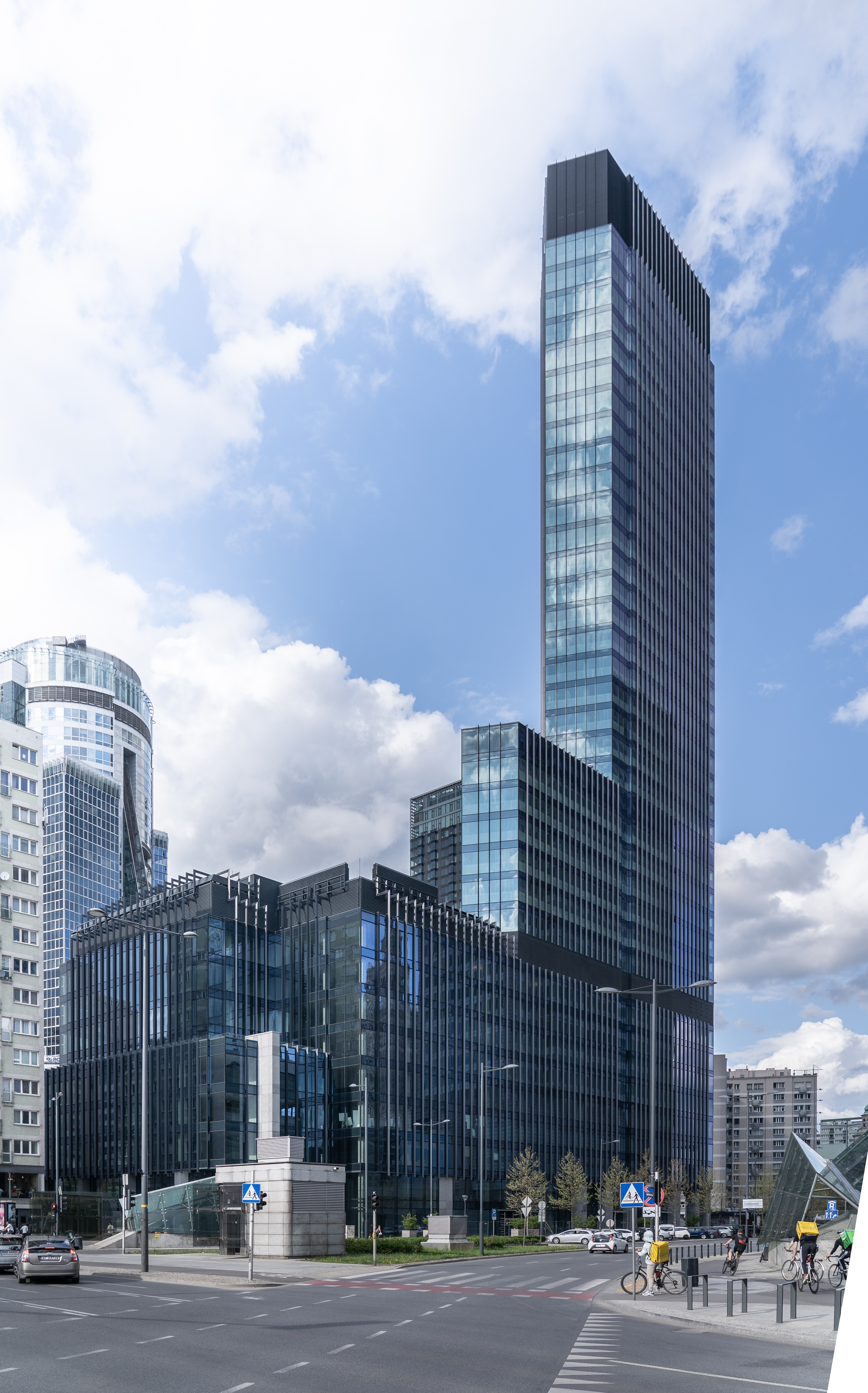
- Skysawa (2022)
- Interactive map of the Skysawa area

General information
- Status: Completed
- Type: Office
- Location: Warsaw, Poland, 36 Świętokrzyska Street
- Coordinates: 52°14′2″N 20°59′58″E
- Construction started: June 2019
- Completed: Building A - Q3 2021 Building B - Q3 2022
- Owner: Polski Holding Nieruchomości S.A.

Height
- Height: 155 m

Technical details
- Floor count: 40
- Floor area: 40,000 m2

Design and construction
- Architecture firm: Polsko Belgijska Pracownia Architektury

Website
- http://skysawa.pl/en/

Skysawa is a pair of buildings in the center of Warsaw, Poland. The buildings are at 36 Świętokrzyska Street on a lot previously occupied by a 1960s 10-storey office building.

Its overall approximate floor area will be 40,000 sqm. Building A will have from 4 to 9 stories and its total floor area will be approximately 11,500 sqm. At 40 stories, the taller Building B will stand 155-metre tall, with approximately 28,000 sqm of floor area. The ground floor and level -1 of the set will feature retail space of 3,000 sqm with shops, restaurants or service points.

== Facilities ==
Under each building there will be a 3-storey underground parking lot offering approximately 140 parking spaces in total, charging stations for electric vehicles and approximately 200 parking spots for bicycles. SKYSAWA will be one of the first buildings in Warsaw to be connected directly to the metro. The adjacent Rondo ONZ metro station will be accessible through an underground passage.

== Name ==
The name SKYSAWA combines the words sky and Sawa (the name of a legendary Polish character). The first part refers to the shape of the 155-metre tall tower. The second part of the name draws on the legend of mermaid Sawa and fisherman Wars, who started a small settlement at the bank of the Vistula river called Warszawa (Warsaw).

== Architecture ==
SKYSAWA was designed by Projekt Polsko-Belgijska Pracownia Architektury. The external structure of the building will consist mostly of transparent surfaces with matte concrete elements and aluminum razors. The structural elements visible from the street perspective will be made of structural concrete. Each of the two buildings will feature terraces located on a variety of levels.

== Certification ==
The buildings will undergo BREEAM (Building Research Establishment Environmental Assessment Method) certification aiming for the highest, OUTSTANDING rating. Building A of the SKYSAWA complex has already been awarded the BREEAM Interim certificate with the OUTSTANDING rating. BREEAM is an established method of assessment used worldwide for rating and certifying the sustainability of buildings at the design and construction stage, as well as during use. BREEAM assesses how environmentally-friendly and comfortable the building is for its users. A BREEAM Outstanding certificate indicates the highest possible rating and is awarded only to buildings in which the requirements of sustainable construction and solutions have been met at an above-standard level.

== Construction ==
Construction of SKYSAWA began at the end of June, 2019, with dismantling, construction and earthworks carried out during stage one. Building A is due to be ready in the third quarter of 2021, and building B in the third quarter of 2022.

The general contractor of the investment is a consortium of three companies: PORR S.A., TKT Engineering and ELIN.

== Nominations and awards ==
SKYSAWA A was nominated for the BREEAM Award 2020 in the Commercial Projects – Design Stage Award category.

== See also ==
- List of tallest buildings in Poland
- Architecture of Poland
