= Warsaw Insurgents Monument =

Monument in Warsaw, Poland

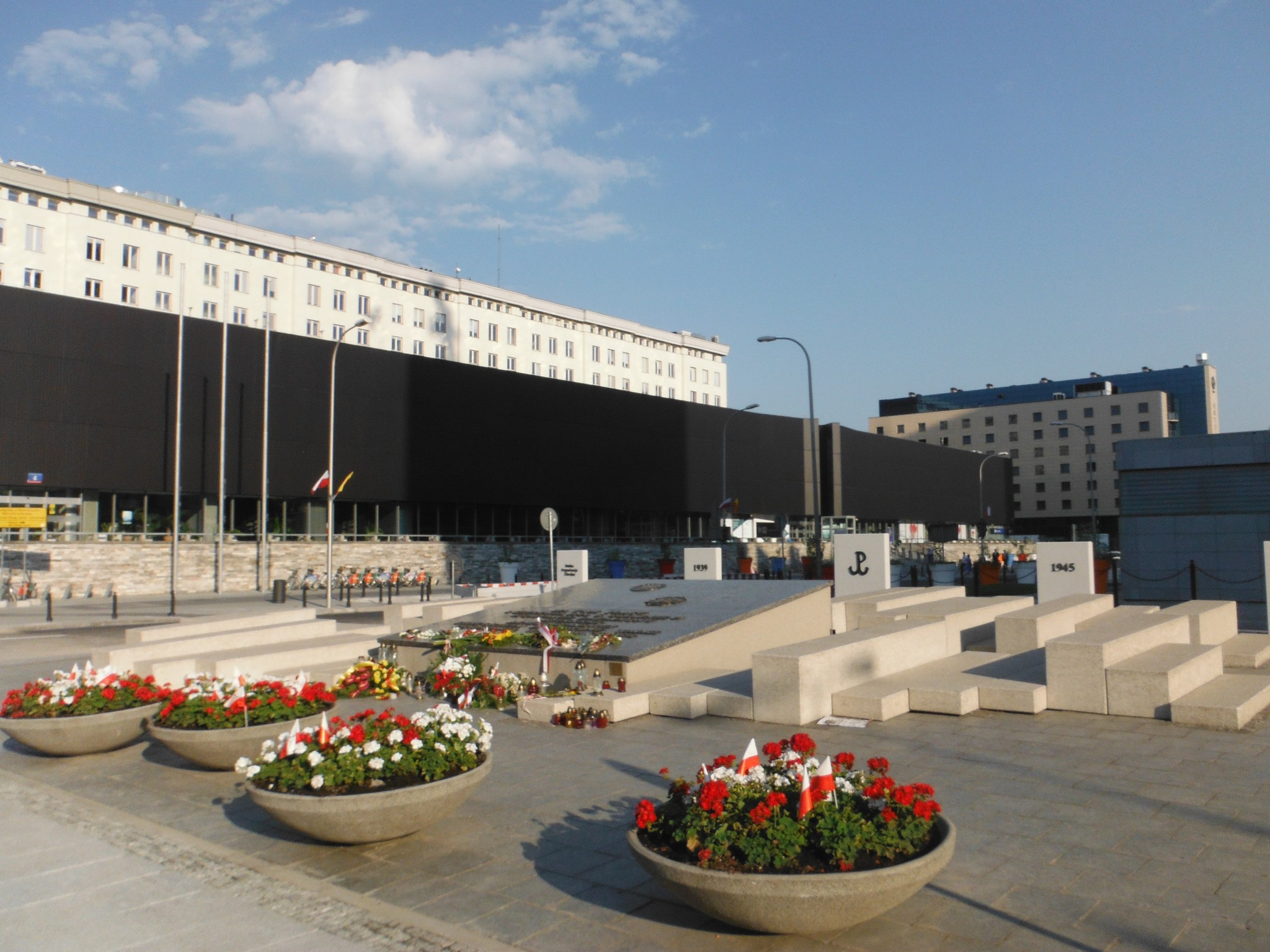
- The monument in 2014.
- Interactive map of Warsaw Insurgents Monument
- Location: Warsaw Insurgents Square, Downtown, Warsaw, Poland
- Coordinates: 52°14′09.2″N 21°00′47.1″E
- Designer: Andrzej Domański
- Type: Sculpture
- Opening date: 1 August 1979
- Dedicated to: Kiliński Battalion

The Warsaw Insurgents Monument (Polish: Pomnik Powstańców Warszawy) is a sculpture in Warsaw, Poland, located at the Warsaw Insurgents Square, in the Downtown district. It commemorates the insurgents of the Kiliński Battalion of the Warsaw Uprising fought in 1944 during the Second World War. The sculpture has a form of a commemorative plaque mounted to the ground surrounded by 63 cuboids of varying lengths and sizes, symbolising the number of days the uprising lasted. It was designed by Andrzej Domański, and unveiled on 1 August 1979.

== History ==
The monument was designed by Andrzej Domański, and unveiled on 1 August 1979, on the 35th anniversary of the beginning of the Warsaw Uprising.

== Characteristics ==
The monument is placed at the Warsaw Insurgents Square in front of Świętokrzyska Street. It commemorates the insurgents of the Kiliński Battalion of the Home Army, which begun the fighting in the area of the square on 1 August 1944. The sculpture has a form of a plaque mounted on the ground, and surrounded by 63 cuboids of varying lengths and sizes, symbolising the number of days the uprising lasted. It features a Polish inscription, as transcribed below.

Polish inscription	English translation
Na tym placu 1 sierpnia 1944 r. o godzinie 17 Kompanie Batalionu „Kiliński" Armii Krajowej rozpoczęły heroiczne walki Powstania Warszawskiego	At this square on 1 August 1944, at 5 pm, companies of Kiliński Battalion have begun heroic fight of the Warsaw Uprising

Since 2018, next to the monument is placed an interactive bench, which plays songs popular among insurgents of the Warsaw Uprising.

== Gallery ==
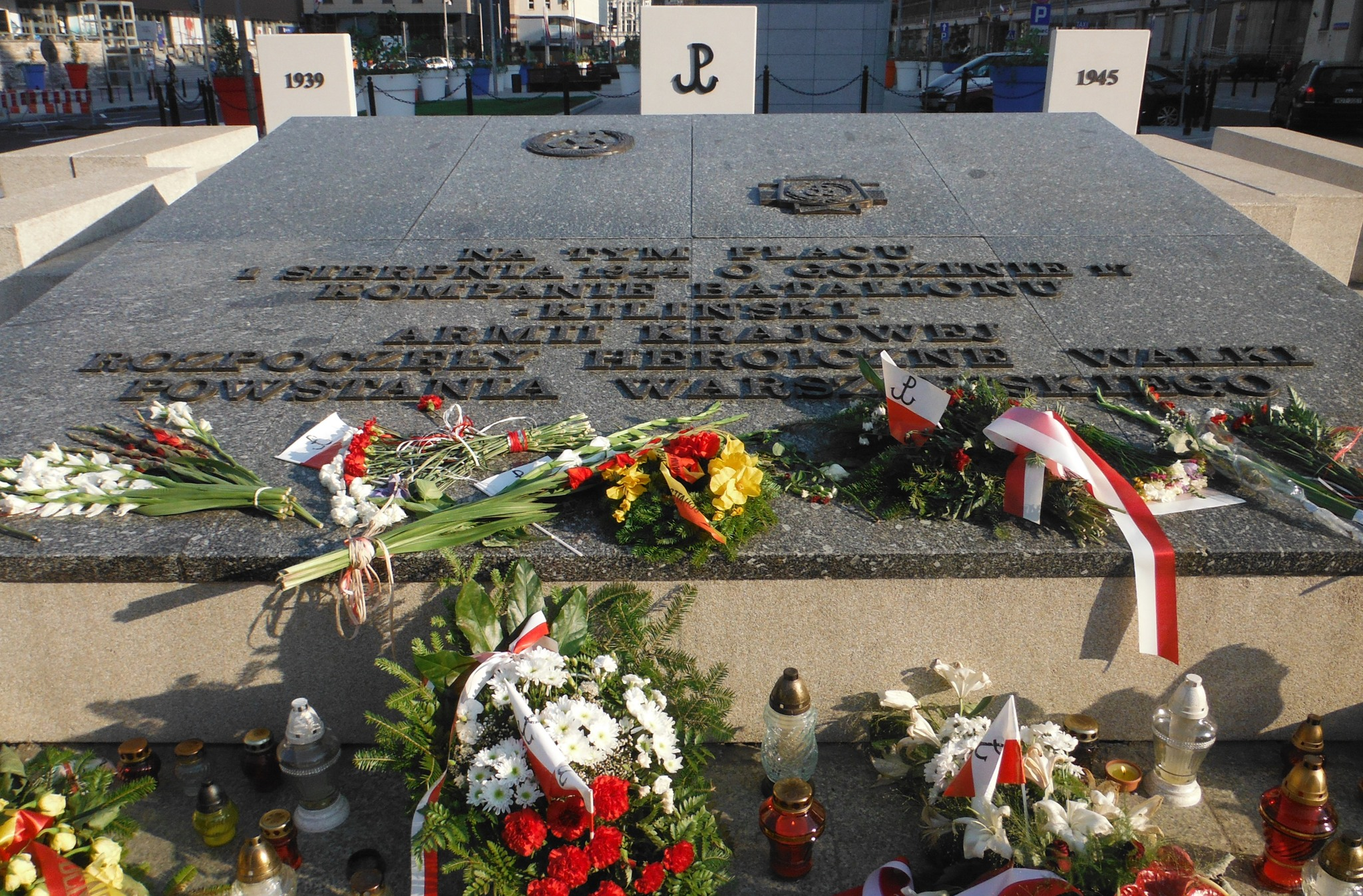
The commemorative plaque of the monument.

== See also ==
- Warsaw Uprising Monument
- The Little Insurrectionist
- Monument to the Women of the Warsaw Uprising
- Warsaw Rising Museum
