= Igrek (building) =

Multifamily residencial building in Warsaw, Poland

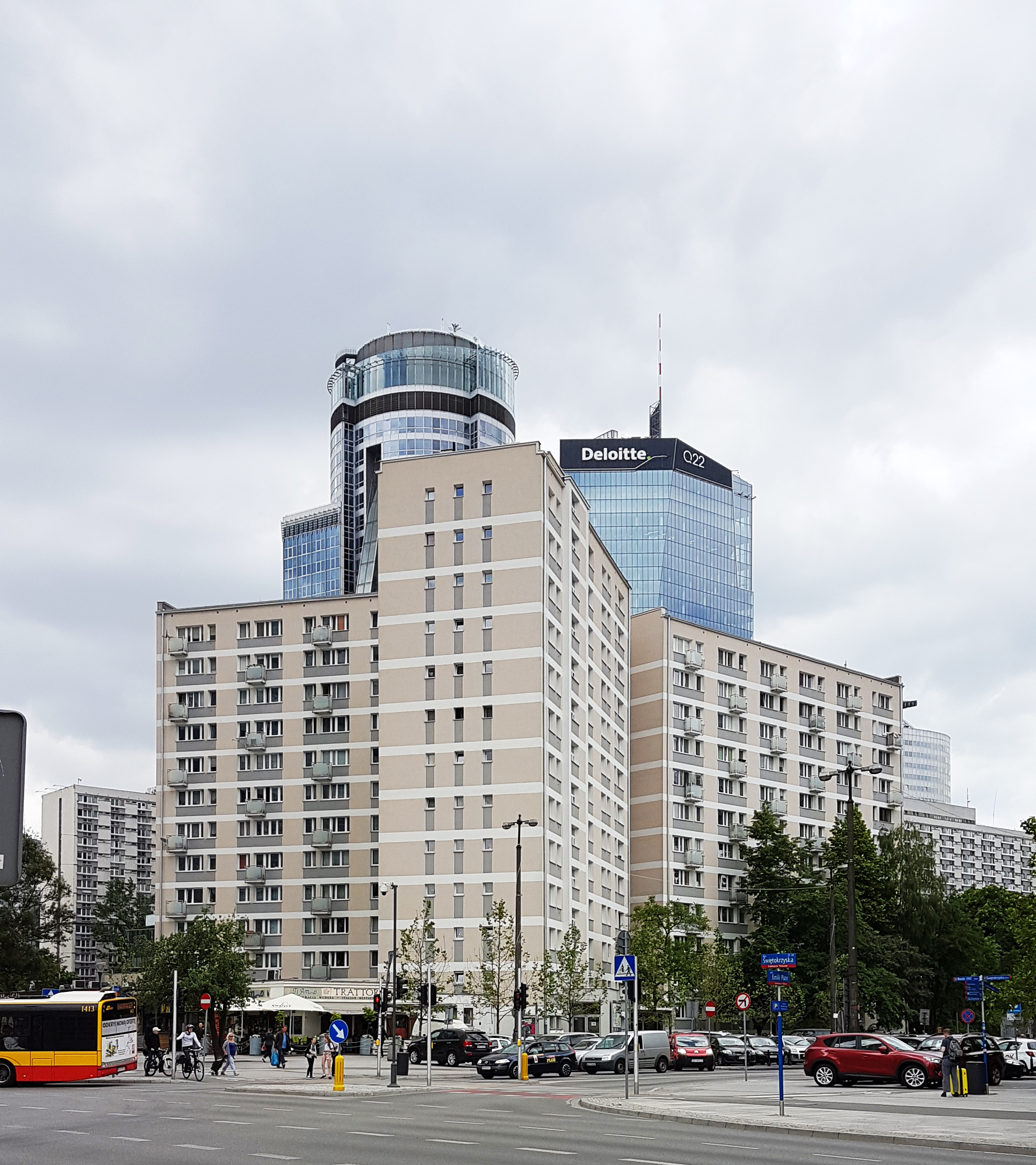
- Igrek in 2017
- Interactive map of the Igrek area

General information
- Location: Warsaw, Poland, 55 Plater Street
- Coordinates: 52°14′04″N 21°00′04″E
- Completed: 1964

Technical details
- Floor count: 13

Igrek (Polish: [ˈi.ɡrɛk]; lit. 'Wye'), also known as Wiatrak (Polish: [vja.trak]; lit. 'Windmill'), is a residential building in Warsaw, Poland, located in the district of Downtown, at 55 Plater Street. It was built in 1964, and was the first residential building of its size to be built in Warsaw, as well as considered the biggest residential building in the city throughout 1960s.

== Name ==
While the building does not have an official name, it is popularly nicknamed as Igrek or Wiatrak. Igrek in Polish translates to the name of the letter Y (wye), while Wiatrak means the windmill. Both nicknames refer to the shape of the building as view from above, which is reminiscent to the letter Y.

== History ==
The building at 55 Plater Street in, Warsaw, popularly known as Igrek (The Y, The Wye) or Wiatrak (The Windmill), was constructed in 1964. It was designed in the shape of the letter Y, inspired by the UNESCO Headquarters building in Paris, France. It is a multifamily residential building that can house around 920 people. It was the first multifamily residential building of its size to be built in Warsaw, and in the 1960s, was considered the biggest residential building in the city.

It was part of the neighbourhood of Mariańska, built between 1961 and 1967, between Jana Pawła II Avenue, Plater Street, Świętokrzyska Street, and Twarda Street, and designed by Hanna Lewicka and Wojciech Piotrowski.
