= North Gate (Warsaw) =

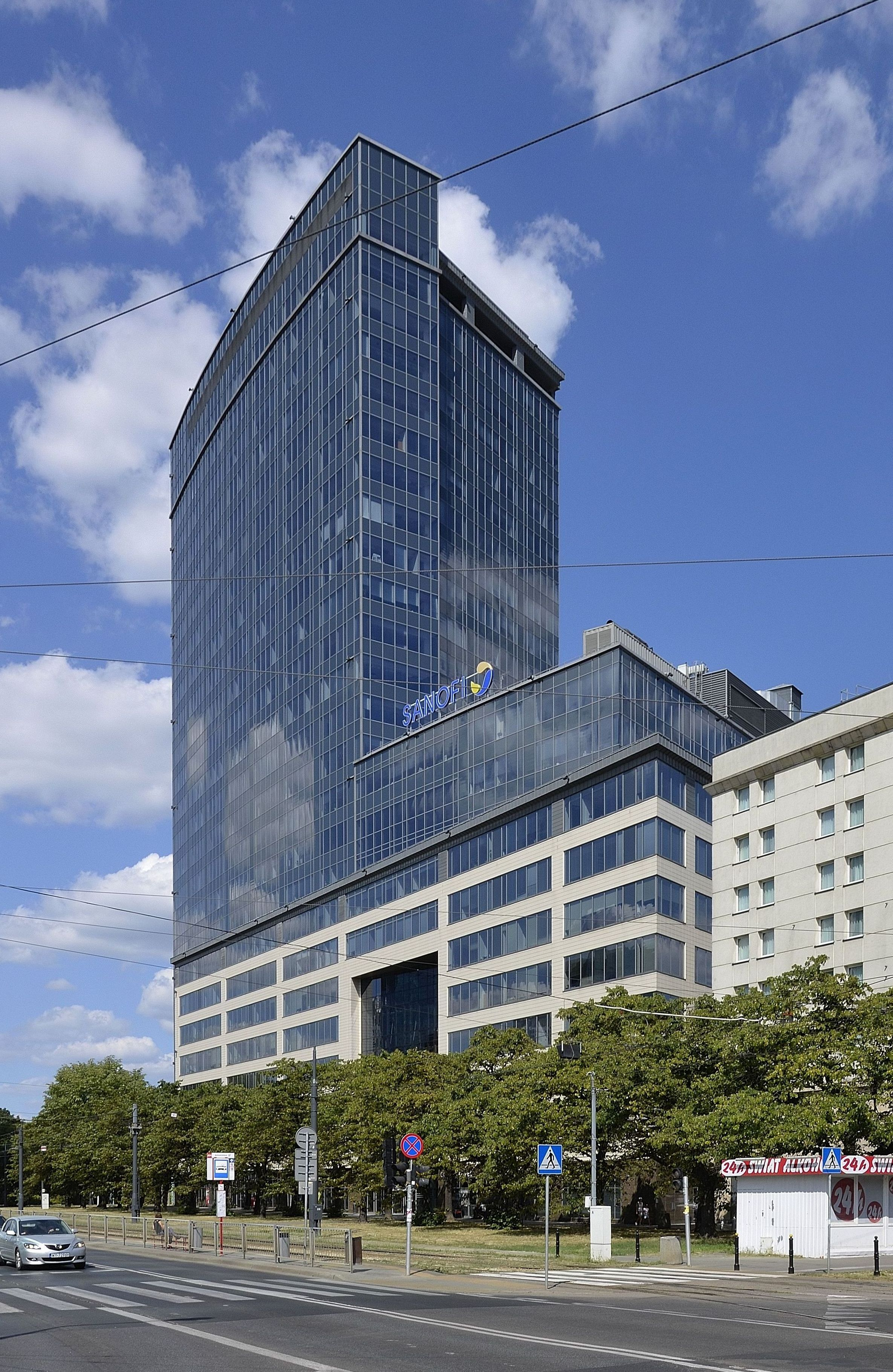
- Interactive map of the North Gate area
- Former names: Centrum Belvedere

General information
- Location: Warsaw, Poland, ul. Bonifraterska 17
- Coordinates: 52°15′16″N 20°59′54.16″E
- Construction started: May 2006
- Completed: 2008

Height
- Height: 94 metres (308 ft)

Technical details
- Floor count: 26
- Floor area: 28,146 square metres (302,960 sq ft)

Website
- north-gate.pl

North Gate (formerly Centrum Belvedere) is a high-rise office building in Warsaw, Poland.

== Description ==
The building is located between Intraco I skyscraper and the Polonia Warszawa football club stadium. In total, the building has approximately 28,146 m^{2} of office space. The building has 310 parking spaces.

The ground floor of the building is designed for trade and services, and the rest of the floors are occupied by offices. Floors 11 to 24 are a part of the tower itself.
