= Emperor Napoleon I Memorial =

Monument in Warsaw, Poland

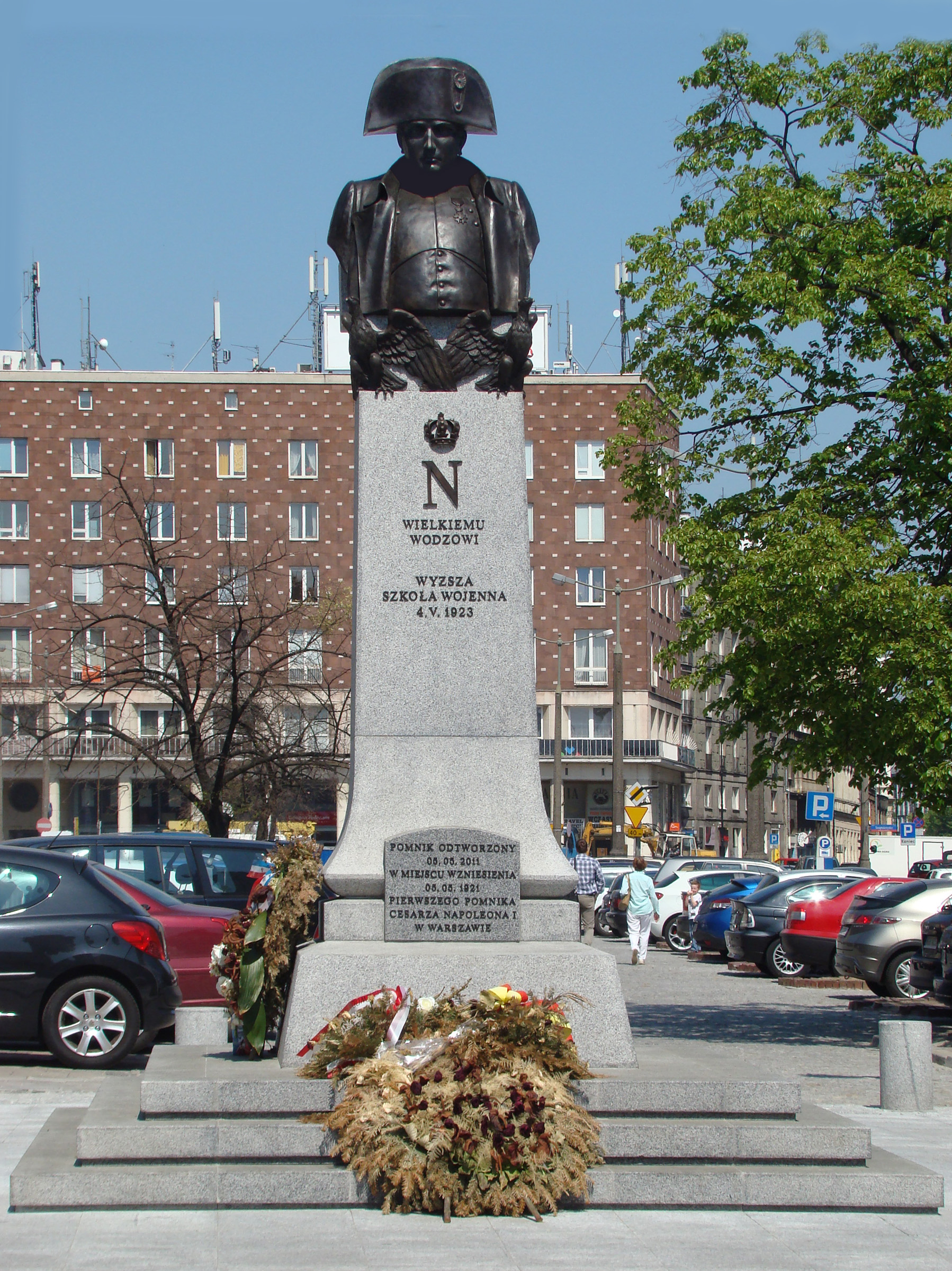
- The monument in 2011.
- Interactive map of Emperor Napoleon I Memorial
- Location: Warsaw Insurgents Square, Downtown, Warsaw, Poland
- Coordinates: 52°14′04″N 21°00′49″E
- Designer: Michał Kamieński
- Type: Bust
- Material: Bronze
- Completion date: 3 May 1923 (original); 5 May 2011 (replica)

The Emperor Napoleon I Memorial (Polish: Pomnik Cesarza Napoleona I) is a sculpture in Warsaw, Poland, placed at the Warsaw Insurgents Square, within the North Downtown neighbourhood. Its dedicated to Napoleon Bonaparte, an 18th-century general and statesman who rose to prominence during the French Revolution and led a series of military campaigns across Europe during the French Revolutionary and Napoleonic Wars from 1796 to 1815, leader of the French First Republic, and later the First French Empire. It depicts him in form of a bronze bust placed on a tall plinth. The original sculpture, designed by Jan Antoni Biernacki, was first unveiled in 1921, before being taken down a few months later, and replaced with another, made by Michał Kamieński, in 1923. It was again removed after the Second World War, with its copy unveiled on 5 May 2011.

== History ==
The original monument, designed by Jan Antoni Biernacki, was unveiled on 5 May 1921, on the 100th anniversary of Napoleon Bonaparte's death. It was placed at the Warsaw Insurgents Square, then renamed for the occasion the Napoleon Square. It was removed after a few months, and became lost.

The second sculpture, designed by Michał Kamieński, was unveiled on 3 May 1923, at the campus of the Military University at 79 Koszykowa Street. It was removed from the display after the Second World War, and placed in the courtyard of the Polish Army Museum at 3 Jerusalem Avenue.

Its replica was unveiled again at the Warsaw Insurgents Square on 5 May 2011, in the 190th anniversary of Bonaparte's death. A cavalry regiment of the French Army participated in the opening ceremony.

Due to the construction of an underground car park, the sculpture was temporarily removed in February 2022, and placed back at a nearby location.

== Design ==
The monument consist of a bronze bust of Napoleon Bonaparte wearing a military uniform and a bicorne. It was placed, together with two statues of eagles below it, on a tall pedestal. In total, the structure has 4.5 meters. The plinth features an inscription, which consists of a large letter N, with a French imperial crown above it, a text below, which reads: "Wielkiemu wodzowi; Wyższa Szkoła Wojenna; 4.V.1923", and translated to "To the great leader; the Military University; 4 May 1929". At the bottom is placed a plaque, with the following inscription: "Pomnik odtworzony 05.05.2011 w miejscu wzniesienia 0.5.05.1921 pierwszego pomnika Cesarza Napoleona I w Warszawie". It translates to "The monument was restored on 5 May 2011, in place of the first monument to Emperor Napoleon I, erected on 5 May 1921".

== Gallery ==
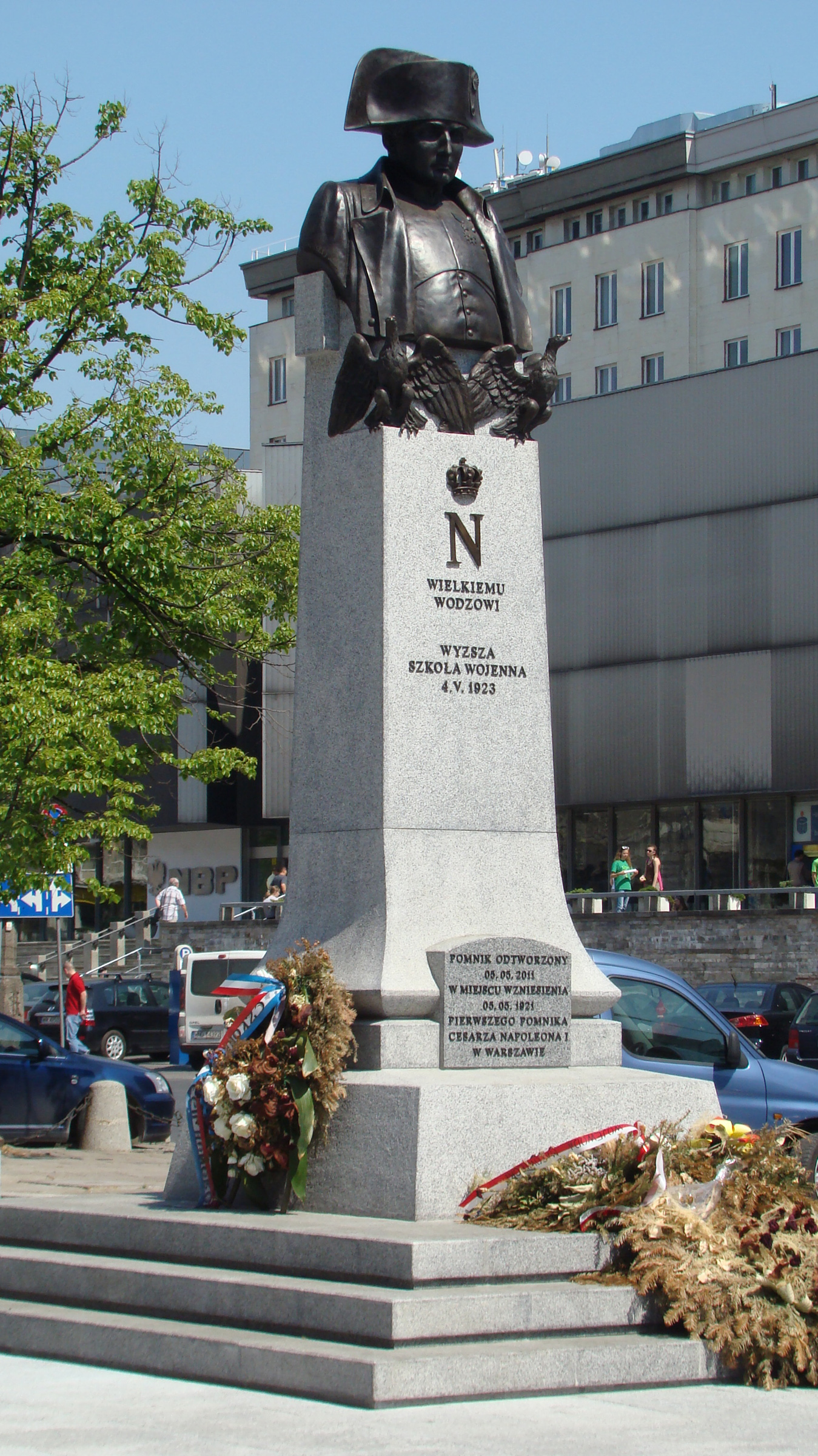
The monument.

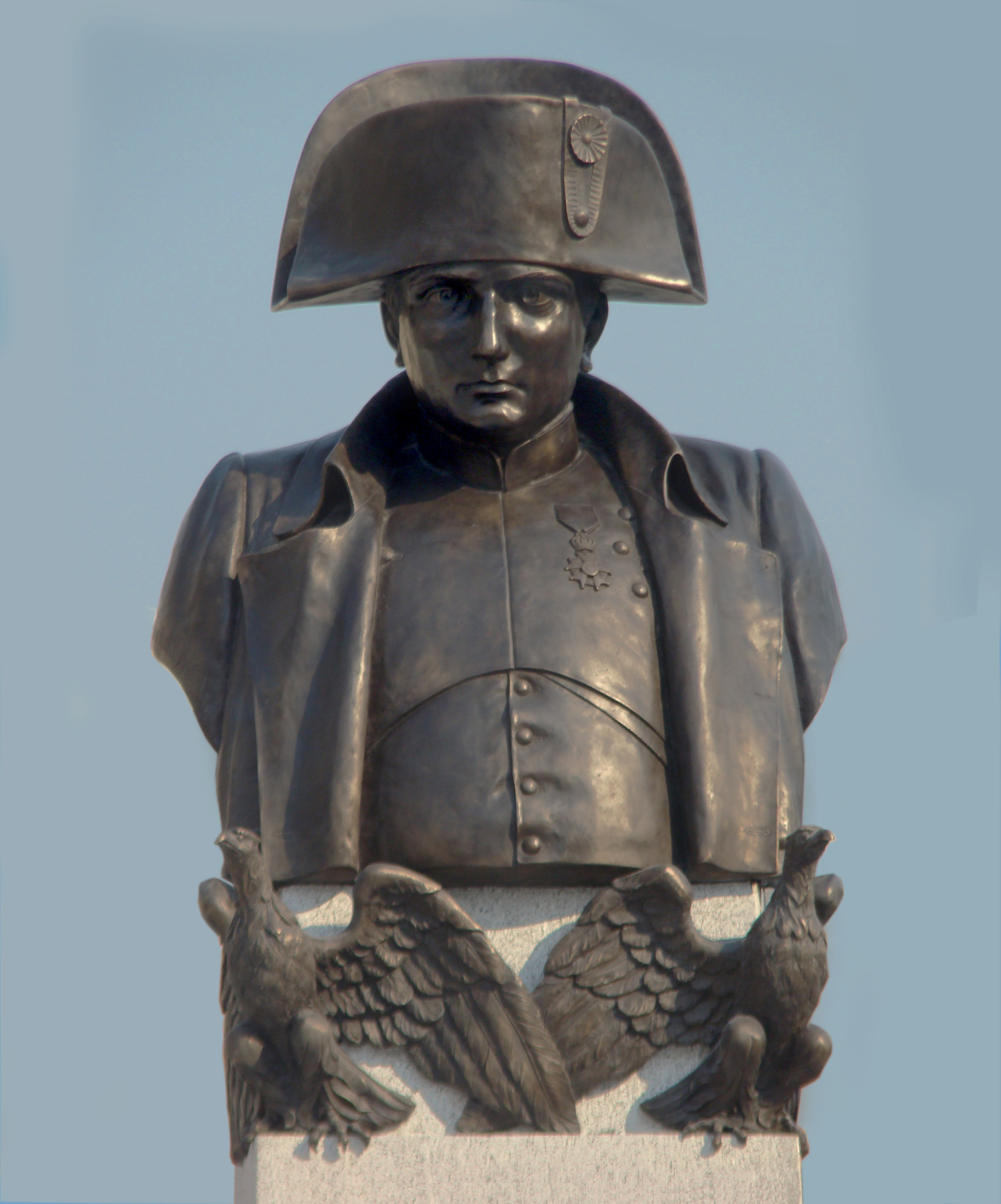
The bust of Napoleon Bonaparte.

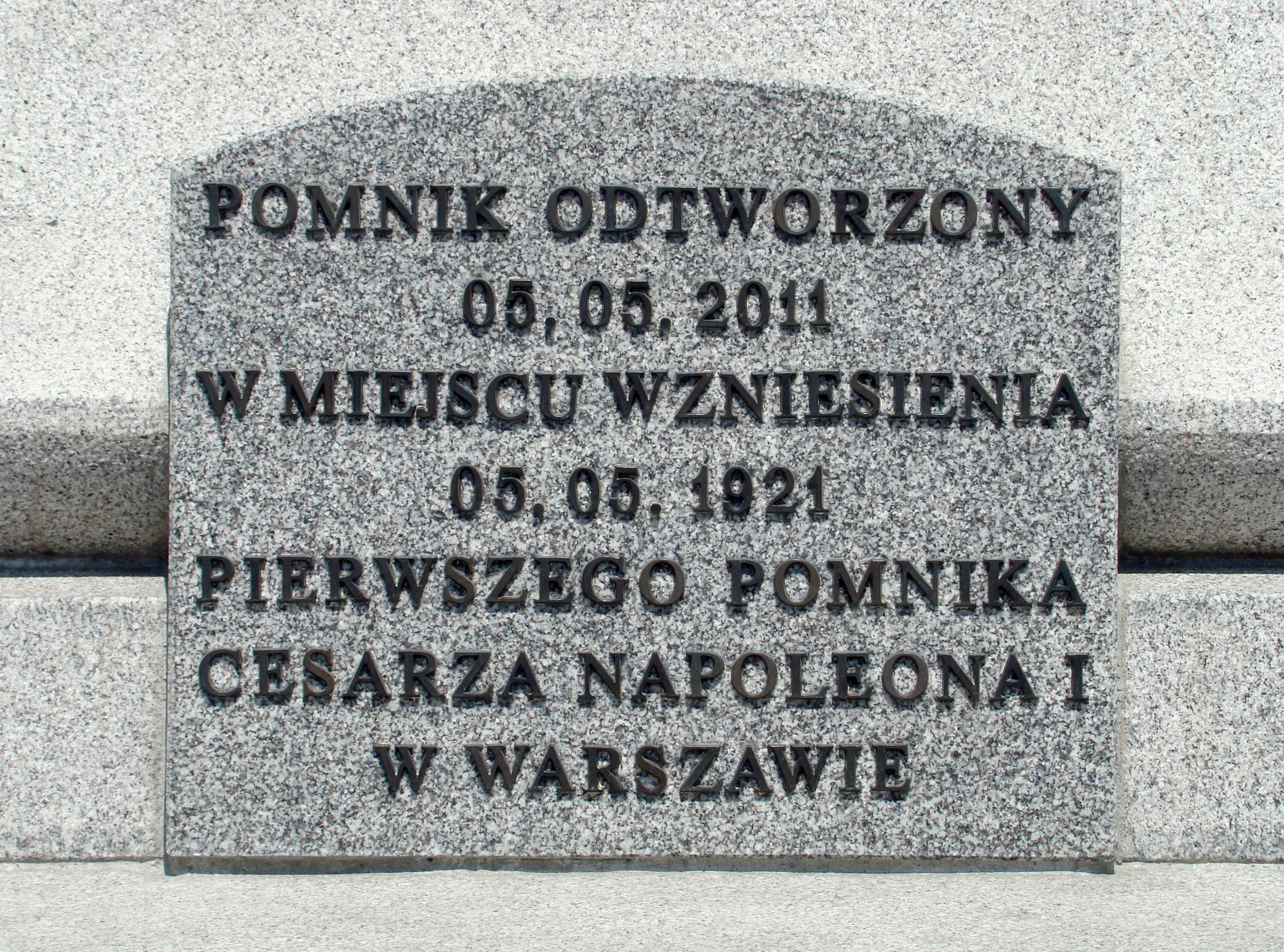
The plaque at the base of the monument.
