= Polski Holding Nieruchomości =

Polish real estate company

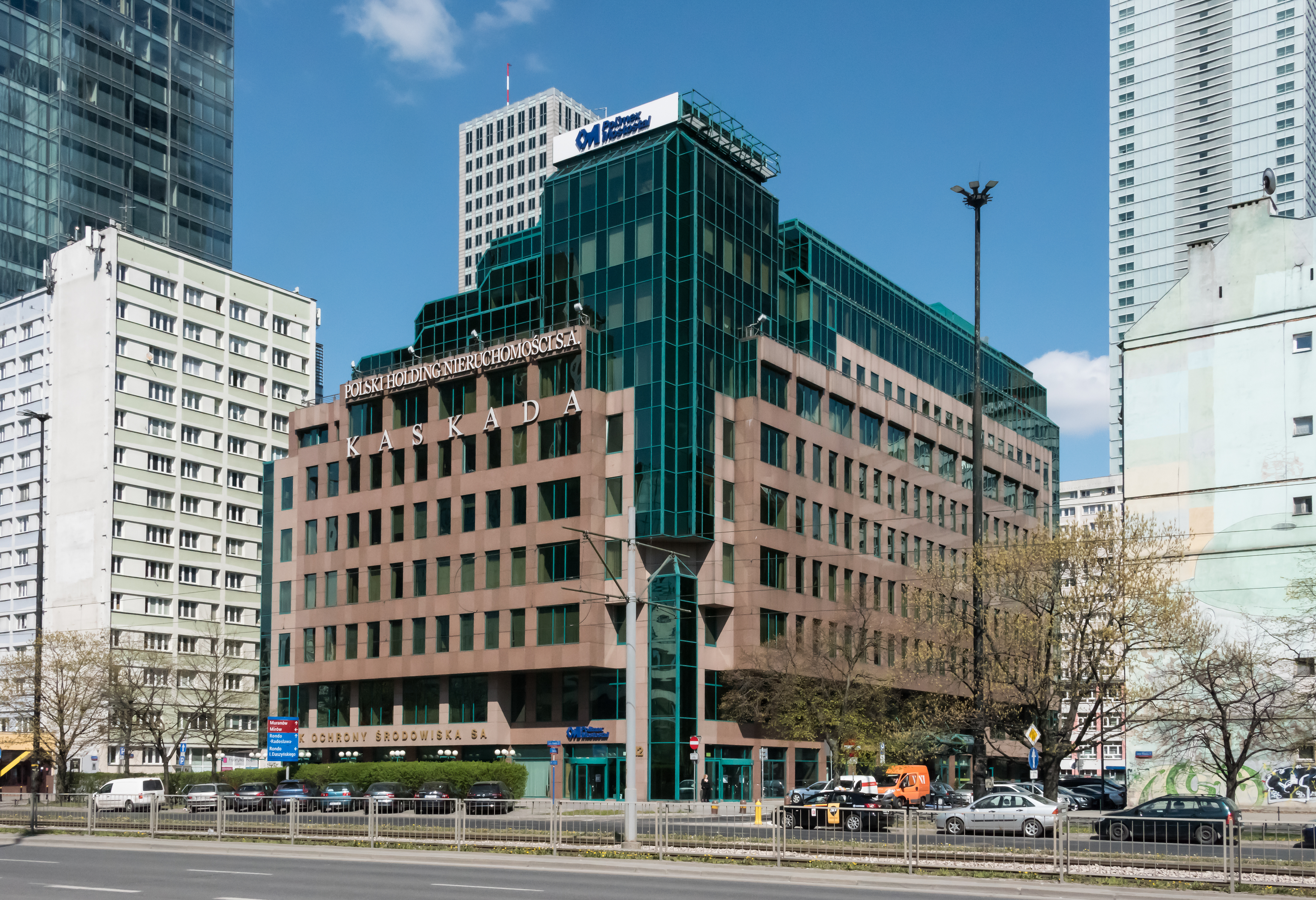
- Kaskada office building at 12 Jana Pawła II Avenue in Warsaw, company headquarters
- Company type: Joint-stock company
- Founded: March 25, 2011
- Headquarters: Warsaw, Poland
- Key people: Marcin Mazurek (President); Izabela Felczak-Poturnicka (Chairman of the supervisory board)

Polski Holding Nieruchomości is a Polish real estate company headquartered in Warsaw. As a company with a holding structure, it controls dozens of subsidiaries. Since February 2013, PHN has been listed on the Warsaw Stock Exchange.

== Activities ==
PHN Group is engaged in real estate development and investment activities, as well as the leasing, trading and management of owned properties. The company also provides consulting services to third parties. PHN's operations are concentrated in Warsaw and the largest regional cities, including Poznań, the Tri-City, Łódź and Wrocław. The company develops projects in the office, retail, logistics, residential and hotel sectors.

=== Largest completed investments ===
- Construction of Foksal City in Warsaw (2014)
- Acquisition of Andersia Business Centre office building in Poznań (2015)
- Construction of Domaniewska Office Hub in Warsaw (2015)
- Acquisition of Alchemia II building in Gdańsk (2016)
- Construction of a commercial building in Białołęka, Warsaw (2019)
- Construction of Marina Yacht Park marina in Gdynia (2019)
- Acquisition of Wilanów Office Park office complex in Warsaw (2019)
- Construction of Hillwood & PHN Pruszków logistics park (2019)
- Construction of a logistics park in Świebodzin (2019)
- Intraco Prime (2021)
- SKYSAWA (2022)

== Capital group and shareholding ==
Polski Holding Nieruchomości S.A. is a holding company that manages the entities it controls. The Group conducts operations through special purpose vehicles, including property and service companies, which, among other things, carry out residential and commercial development projects. PHN's largest shareholder is the Treasury, whose shareholding is 71.9 percent (2023). In addition, shares are held by individual and institutional investors, including pension funds Aviva Santander OFE 9.1 percent and Nationale-Nederlanden OFE 5.64 percent, among others.

== Presidents ==
- Wojciech Papierak (2011–2013)
- Artur Lebiedziński (2013–2015)
- Maciej Jankiewicz (2016–2018)
- Marcin Mazurek (since 2018)
