= Świętokrzyska Street, Warsaw =

Street in Warsaw

Coordinates: 52°14′07″N 21°00′34″E

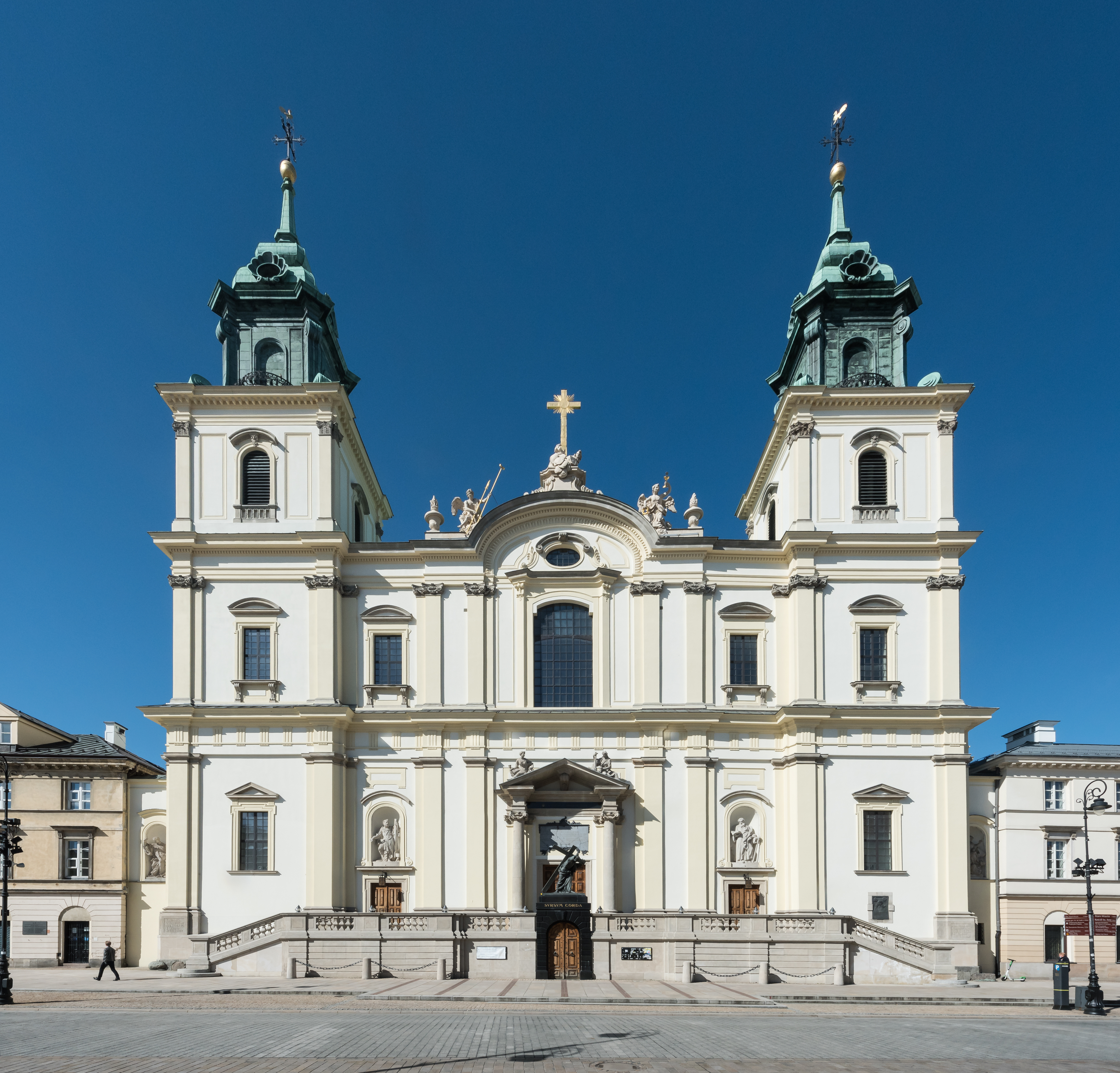
Holy Cross Church (on Krakowskie Przedmieście), for which ulica Świętokrzyska is named

Ulica Świętokrzyska (Holy Cross Street) in Warsaw's city centre is one of the Polish city's principal thoroughfares. It links the city's centre with Wola borough.

The street is named for Holy Cross Church, which stands on Krakowskie Przedmieście. Named after the street are a Warsaw Metro station and the Świętokrzyski Bridge.

The street was closed to traffic and trams from 2011 to March 2015 due to the construction of Warsaw's second Metro line (which runs underneath the length of the street).

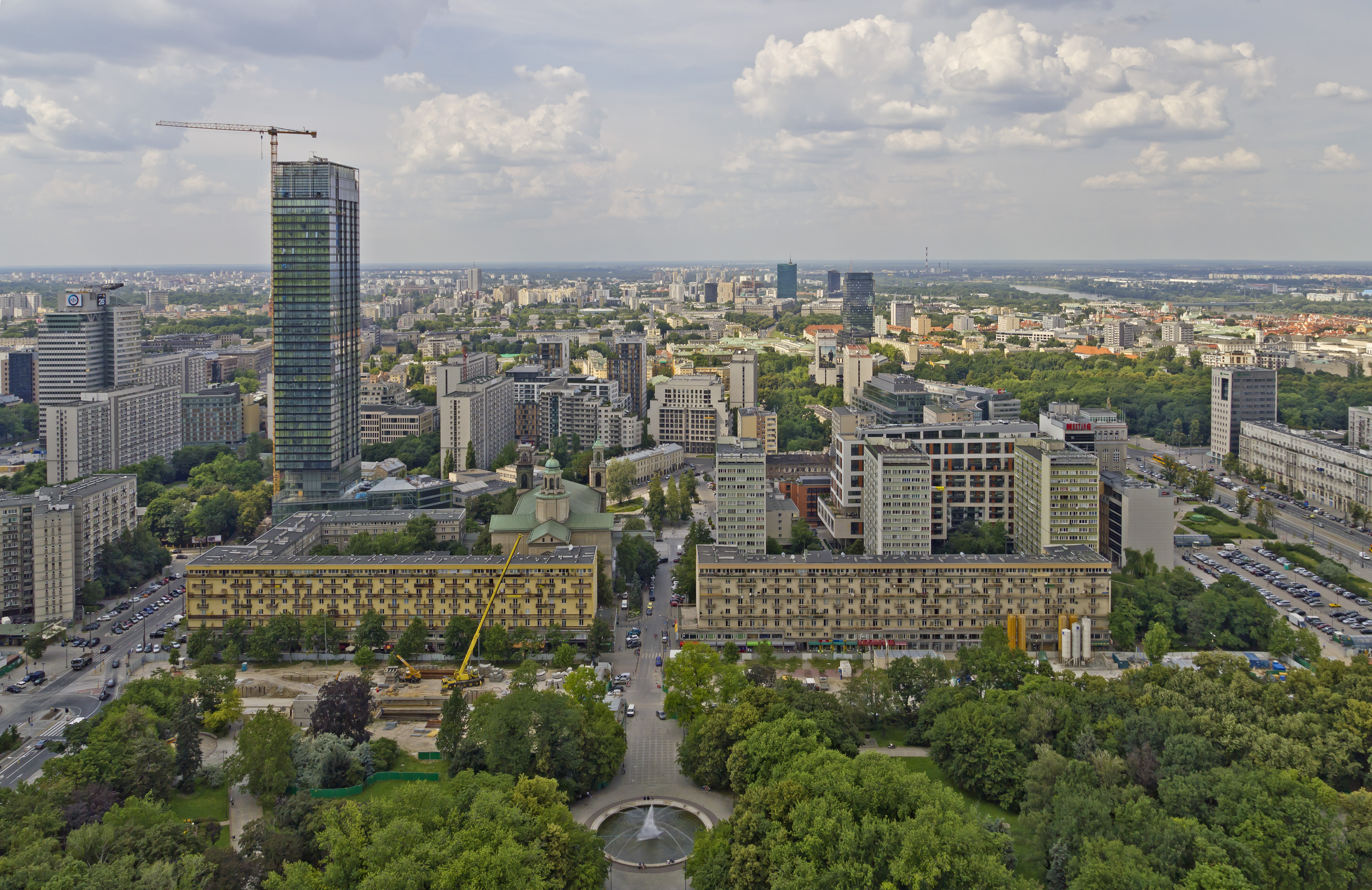
Świętokrzyska Street, viewed from Palace of Culture and Science
