= List of tallest buildings in Poland =

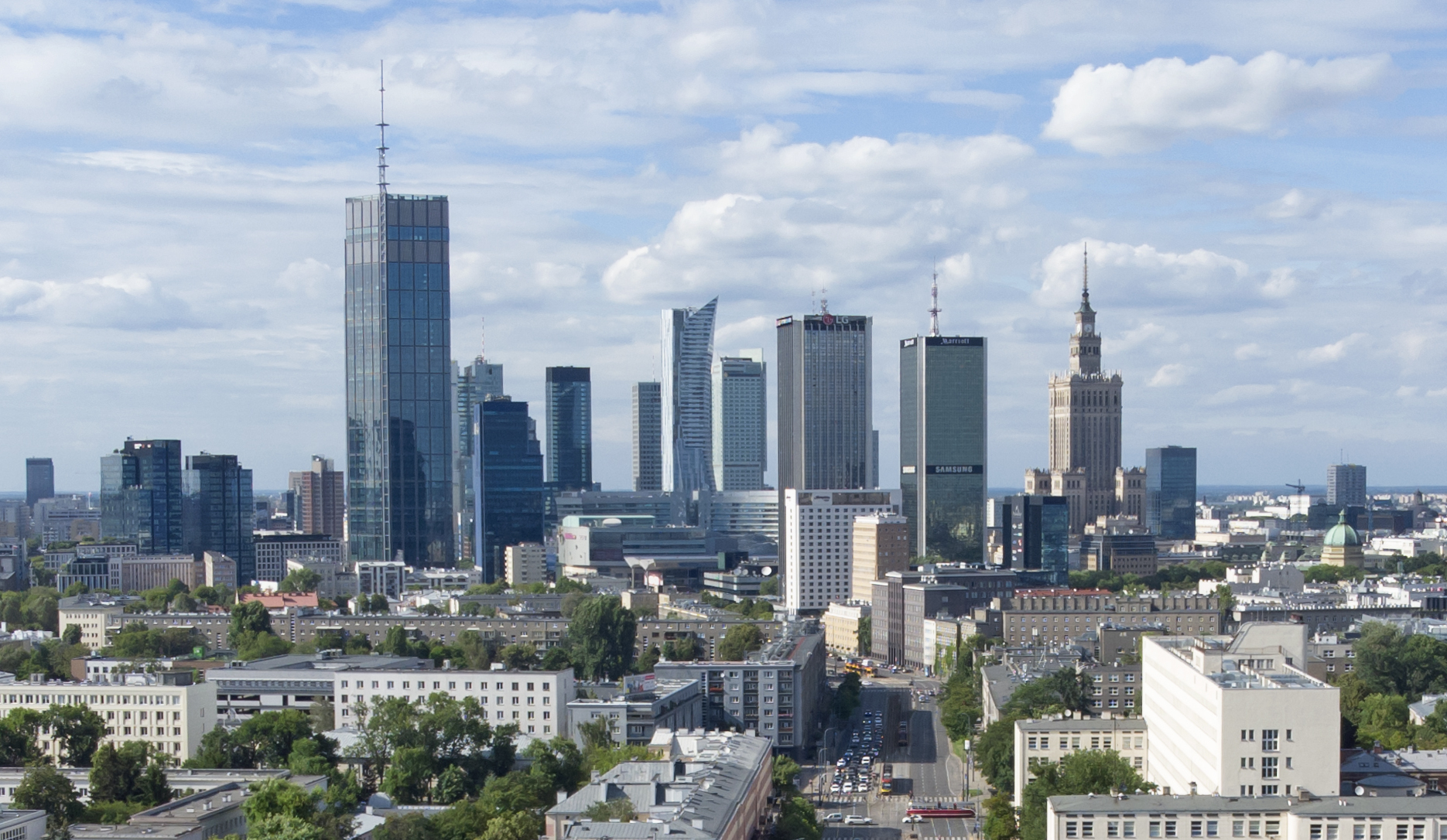
Skyline of Śródmieście, Warsaw

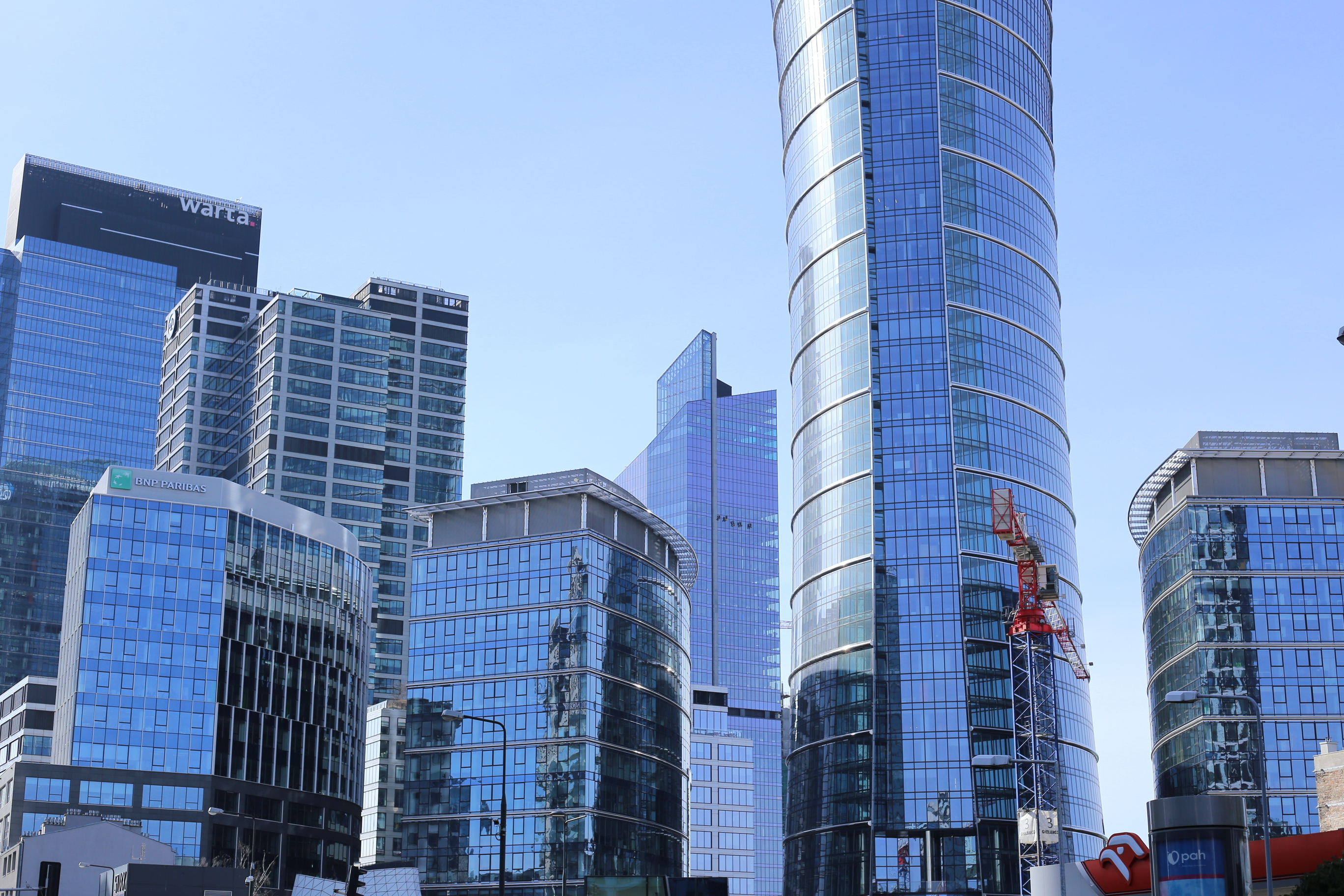
Skyline of Wola, Warsaw

Poland has 46 high-rise buildings that stand at least 100 metres (330 ft) tall, being one of 17 countries in the world to have a supertall skyscraper (building that rises at least 300 m (984 ft)).

The country's first high-rises started to be constructed in Warsaw, Katowice, Wrocław, Łódź and Kraków in the first half of the 20th century. The PAST Building was the first such building in Poland. Built in 1908, it was at that time the tallest residential building in Europe at 51.5 metres (169 ft), as well as one of the earliest reinforced concrete structures of this type in the continent. Other early high-rises include the Drapacz Chmur, in Katowice, and the Prudential, in Warsaw, which was in its completion in 1933 the tenth tallest building in Europe at 66 metres (217 ft).

At the beginning of the post-war period, the 237-metre (778 ft) tall Palace of Culture and Science was built in the centre of Warsaw at the behest of Soviet leader Joseph Stalin. At the time of its completion in 1955, it was the eighth tallest building in the world and the second tallest in Europe, retaining these positions until 1961 and 1990, respectively.

Poland saw a major increase in the number of high-rise buildings following its political transformation of 1989 and throughout the 21st century. Most of the country's tallest skyscrapers are located in the Śródmieście and Wola districts of Warsaw. In Śródmieście, a cluster of skyscrapers is arranged around the centrally located Palace of Culture and Science. Since the 1970s the district's urban planning has been designed in a way that counterpoints the skyline domination by the Palace.

The tallest building in Poland is currently the 310-metre (1,017 ft) tall Varso Tower, in Warsaw, which is also the tallest building in the European Union and the sixth tallest building in Europe.

== Tallest buildings ==
This list ranks buildings in Poland that stand at least 100 metres (330 ft) tall.

Was the tallest building in Poland upon completion

Rank	Name	Image	City	Height	Floors	Year	Notes
1	Varso Tower		Warsaw	310 m (1,017 ft)	53	2022	The tallest building in the European Union and the sixth tallest building in Europe.
2	Palace of Culture and Science		Warsaw	237 m (778 ft) (Note: Height according to the official website of the Palace which claims that the additional 6-metre spire-antenna addition is an integral part of the spire.)	42	1955	
3	Olszynki Park		Rzeszów	220.67 m (724 ft)	42	2024	Tallest residential building in Poland
4	Warsaw Spire		Warsaw	220 m (722 ft)	49	2016	
5	Sky Tower		Wrocław	212 m (696 ft)	51	2012	The tallest building in Wrocław.
6	Warsaw Unit		Warsaw	202 m (663 ft)	46	2021	
7	Skyliner		Warsaw	195 m (640 ft)	45	2020	The Skyliner is Karimpol's biggest project.
8	Złota 44		Warsaw	192 m (630 ft)	54	2012	Designed by Daniel Liebeskind.
9	Warsaw Trade Tower		Warsaw	187.2 m (614 ft)	43	1999	It has one of Europe's fastest elevators, travelling at a speed of 7 metres (23 ft) per second.
10	The Bridge		Warsaw	174 m (571 ft)	41	2025	
11	InterContinental Warsaw		Warsaw	163.5 m (536 ft)	45	2004	The building houses the third tallest hotel in Europe (after Hotel Ukraina and Gran Hotel Bali).
12	Cosmopolitan Twarda 2/4		Warsaw	160 m (525 ft)	44	2013	
13	Rondo 1		Warsaw	159.2 m (522 ft)	41	2006	
14	Olivia Star		Gdańsk	156 m (512 ft)	35	2018	The tallest building in Gdańsk and Tricity.
15=	Q22		Warsaw	155 m (509 ft)	42	2016	The letter "Q" in the building's name alludes to the structure of quartz crystal, which inspired its architectural design.
15=	Skysawa		Warsaw	155 m (509 ft)	40	2022	
17	Warsaw Financial Center		Warsaw	143.9 m (472 ft)	34	1998	
18=	Centrum LIM		Warsaw	140 m (459 ft)	43	1989	
18=	Mennica Legacy Tower		Warsaw	140 m (459 ft)	34	2020	
18=	Generation Park		Warsaw	140 m (459 ft)	34	2020	
21	Chałubińskiego 8		Warsaw	139 m (456 ft)	42	1979	Formerly known as Intraco II and Oxford Tower.
22	KTW II		Katowice	133 m (436 ft)	31	2022	The tallest building in Katowice.
23=	The Warsaw Hub 1		Warsaw	130 m (427 ft)	31	2020	
23=	The Warsaw Hub 2		Warsaw	130 m (427 ft)	31	2020	
25	Spektrum Tower		Warsaw	128 m (420 ft)	30	2001	Unique features of the building include a helipad on the roof and an external elevator shaft, which connects the street level with one of the higher office floors.
26	Sea Towers		Gdynia	127.4 m (418 ft)	36	2009	The tallest building in Gdynia.
27=	Altus		Katowice	125 m (410 ft)	30	2002	
27=	Hanza Tower		Szczecin	125 m (410 ft)	29	2020	The tallest building in Szczecin.
29	Forest		Warsaw	120 m (394 ft)	29	2021	
30	Central Tower		Warsaw	115 m (377 ft)	26	1993	
31=	Atlas Tower		Warsaw	112 m (367 ft)	28	1999	Formerly known as Millennium Plaza.
31=	Łucka City		Warsaw	112 m (367 ft)	30	2004	
33	Novotel Warszawa Centrum		Warsaw	110 m (361 ft)	33	1979	
34	Intraco I		Warsaw	107 m (351 ft)	39	1975	Between 1975 and 1978 it was the tallest office building in Warsaw.
35=	Towarowa Tower A		Warsaw	105 m (344 ft)	30	2024	
35=	Towarowa Tower B		Warsaw	105 m (344 ft)	30	2024	
35=	Złote Tarasy		Warsaw	105 m (344 ft)	26	2007	
35=	K1		Kraków	105 m (344 ft)	20	1998	The tallest building in Kraków.
39=	Global Office Park A1		Katowice	104 m (341 ft)	25	2022	
39=	Global Office Park A2		Katowice	104 m (341 ft)	25	2022	
39=	PZU Tower		Warsaw	104 m (341 ft)	20	2000	Headquarters of PZU Group.
42	Ilmet		Warsaw	103 m (338 ft)	22	1997	
43	Unity Tower		Kraków	102.5 m (336 ft)	27	2020	Popularly known as Szkieletor ("Skeletor"), the completion of the building took almost 45 years.
44	Andersia Tower		Poznań	102 m (335 ft)	21	2007	The tallest building in Poznań.
45	Organika Trade		Gdańsk	100.5 m (330 ft)	20	1980	
46	Błękitny Wieżowiec		Warsaw	100 m (328 ft)	28	1991	It stands in the place that was occupied before World War II by Warsaw's largest synagogue, the Great Synagogue.

== Under construction ==
This list ranks buildings under construction in Poland that plan to stand at least 100 metres (330 ft) tall.

Indicates buildings that have been topped out

Name	City	Height	Floors	Planned completion
Skyreach	Warsaw	170 m (558 ft)	48	
AFI Tower	Warsaw	150 m (492 ft)	41	2028
Cavatina Quorum B	Wrocław	140 m (459 ft)	35	
Upper One	Warsaw	131.5 m (431 ft)	34	2026
Skyliner II	Warsaw	130 m (427 ft)	33	2026
Atal Olimpijska B	Katowice	128 m (420 ft)	36	2025
Atal Sky+ A	Katowice	121 m (397 ft)	35	2025
SKYCITY	Gdynia	120 m (393 ft)	35	
AND2	Poznań	116 m (381 ft)	25	2025
Studio A	Warsaw	102 m (335 ft)	26	2025

== Approved ==
This list ranks approved buildings in Poland that plan to stand at least 100 metres (330 ft) tall.

Name	City	Height	Floors	Planned start
Oz-Bud Office Centre A	Wrocław	214.2 m (703 ft)	53	
Roma Tower	Warsaw	170 m (558 ft)	46	2024
Oz-Bud Office Centre B	Wrocław	166.2 m (545 ft)	41	
Port Praski 1	Warsaw	160 m (525 ft)		
Liberty Tower	Warsaw	140 m (459 ft)	41	
Oz-Bud Office Centre D	Wrocław	134.2 m (440 ft)	33	
Oz-Bud Office Centre C	Wrocław	130.2 m (427 ft)	32	
Chopin Tower	Warsaw	130 m (427 ft)		2024–2025
Sobieski Tower	Warsaw	130 m (427 ft)	34	2024–2025
Spark	Warsaw	130 m (427 ft)	30	2027
Towarowa 22 Tower 2	Warsaw	120 m (394 ft)		2024–2025
Port Praski 2	Warsaw	120 m (394 ft)		
Towarowa 22 Tower 3	Warsaw	110 m (361 ft)		2024–2025
Port Praski 3	Warsaw	110 m (361 ft)		
Port Praski 4	Warsaw	100 m (328 ft)	23	

== Timeline of tallest buildings ==
Name	Image	City	Height	Floors	Years as tallest
PAST Building		Warsaw	51.5 m (169 ft)	11	1908–1933
Prudential		Warsaw	66 m (217 ft)	17	1933–1955 (Note: The building's structure was heavily damaged during the Warsaw Uprising of 1944, when it was hit by approximately 1,000 artillery shells, including by a 2-tonne Karl-Gerät mortar shell. The artillery damage left only the steel framework standing and bent the tower sideways, but it survived the war and was rebuilt afterwards, remaining as Poland's tallest building until 1955.)
Palace of Culture and Science		Warsaw	237 m (778 ft)	42	1955–2022
Varso Tower		Warsaw	310 m (1,020 ft)	53	2022–present

== Cities with buildings over 100 metres ==
City	≥300 m	≥250 m	≥200 m	≥150 m	≥100 m
Warsaw	1	1	4	13	33
Katowice					4
Gdańsk				1	2
Kraków					2
Wrocław			1	1	1
Poznań					1
Gdynia					1
Szczecin					1
Rzeszów			1	1	1

=== Cities with buildings over 100 metres under construction ===
City	≥300 m	≥250 m	≥200 m	≥150 m	≥100 m
Warsaw				2	5
Katowice					2
Wrocław					1
Poznań					1

== See also ==
- List of tallest buildings in Warsaw
- List of tallest buildings in Katowice
- List of tallest buildings in Poznań
- List of tallest buildings in Europe
