= Olszynki Park =

New notable complex of buildings in Poland

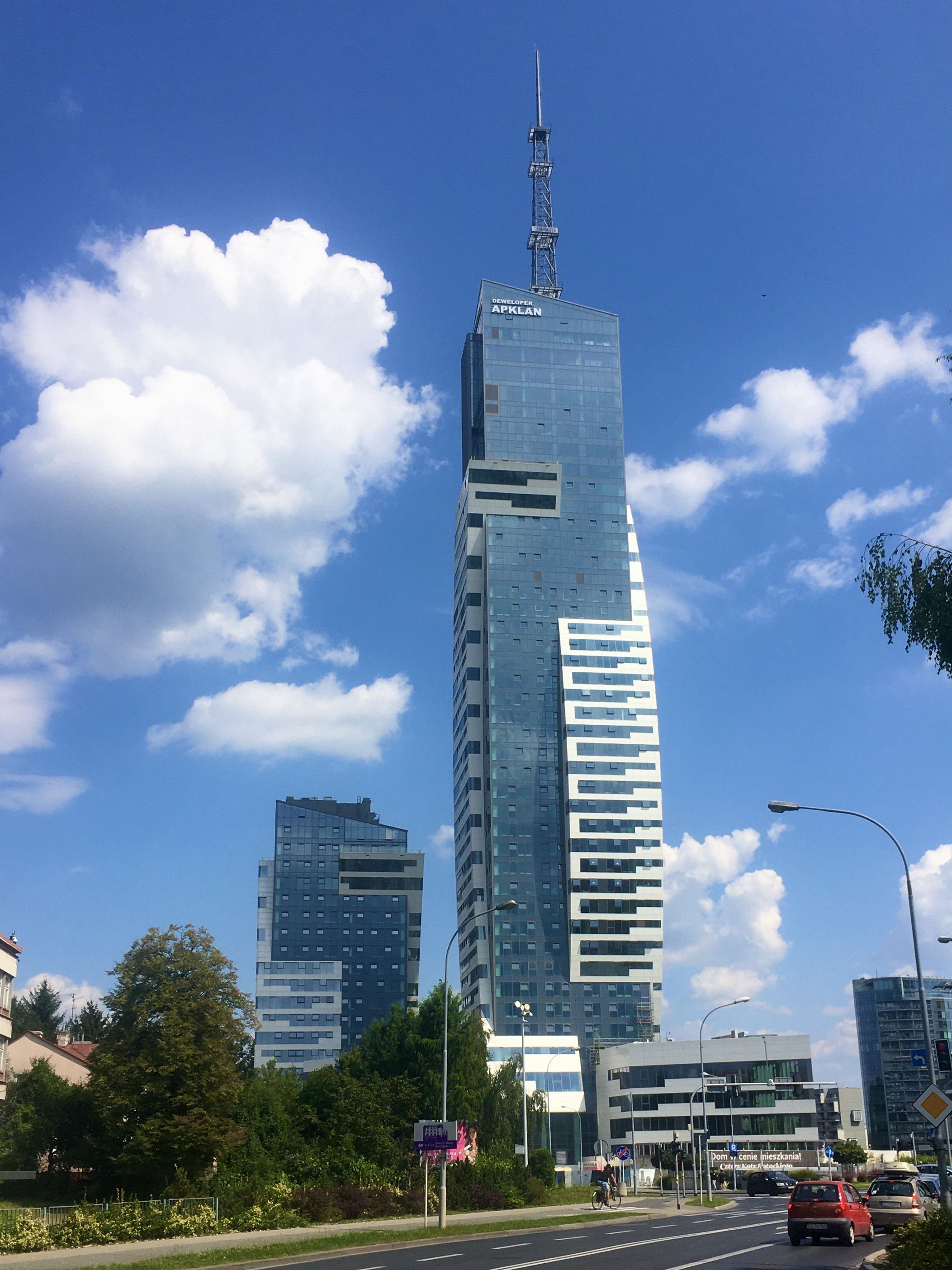
- Olszynki Park in 2024
- Interactive map of the Olszynki Park area

General information
- Status: Topped out
- Type: Mixed-use
- Location: Rzeszów, Poland, 35c Fryderyka Szopena Street
- Coordinates: 50°01′55″N 22°00′18″E
- Construction started: July 2019
- Topped-out: August 2024

Height
- Architectural: 220.67 metres (724.0 ft)
- Tip: 220.67 metres (724.0 ft)
- Roof: 161 metres (528 ft)

Technical details
- Floor count: 41

Design and construction
- Architect: S.T. Architekci
- Developer: Apklan

Website
- https://olszynkipark.pl/

Olszynki Park is a mixed-use complex of buildings located in Rzeszów, Poland. The investment notably includes two tall buildings out of which one can be defined as a skyscraper. Wieżowiec W (English: Skyscraper W) stands at 220.67 metres (724.0 ft) tall and is the third tallest building in Poland. It is also the tallest residential building in the country, surpassing previous record holders for this position.

== Description ==
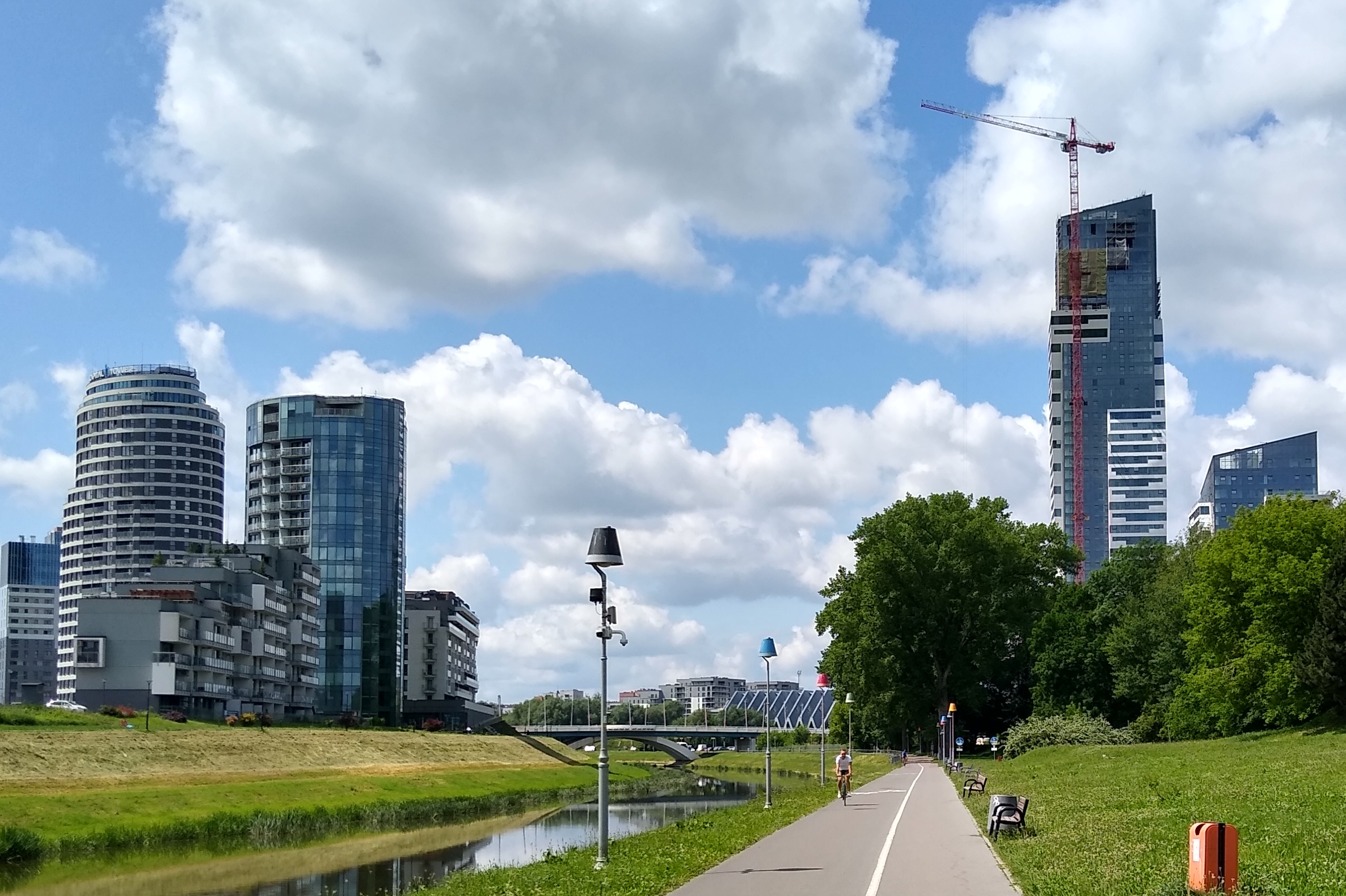
Olszynki Park during construction in proximity to other high-rises

The complex is located in the Śródmieście (English: Downtown) district of Rzeszów in close proximity to the Wisłok river, from across which the two towers of the site share their city skyline with other high-rises. It borders Wojciecha Kilara street from the north-west and Fryderyka Szopena street from the north.

Local architectural studio from Rzeszów, S.T. Architekci, is responsible for the design of the complex, whereas the construction is being conducted by Apklan. The two towers have an asymmetrical appearance thanks to shapes resembling ship sails integrated into the main glass façade structure.

Olszynki Park consists of four main architectural elements: a 220.67 metres (724.0 ft) tall skyscraper Wieżowiec W, 78 metres (256 ft) tall tower Wieżowiec N, and two 30 metres (98 ft) tall commercial and service buildings.

== Construction ==
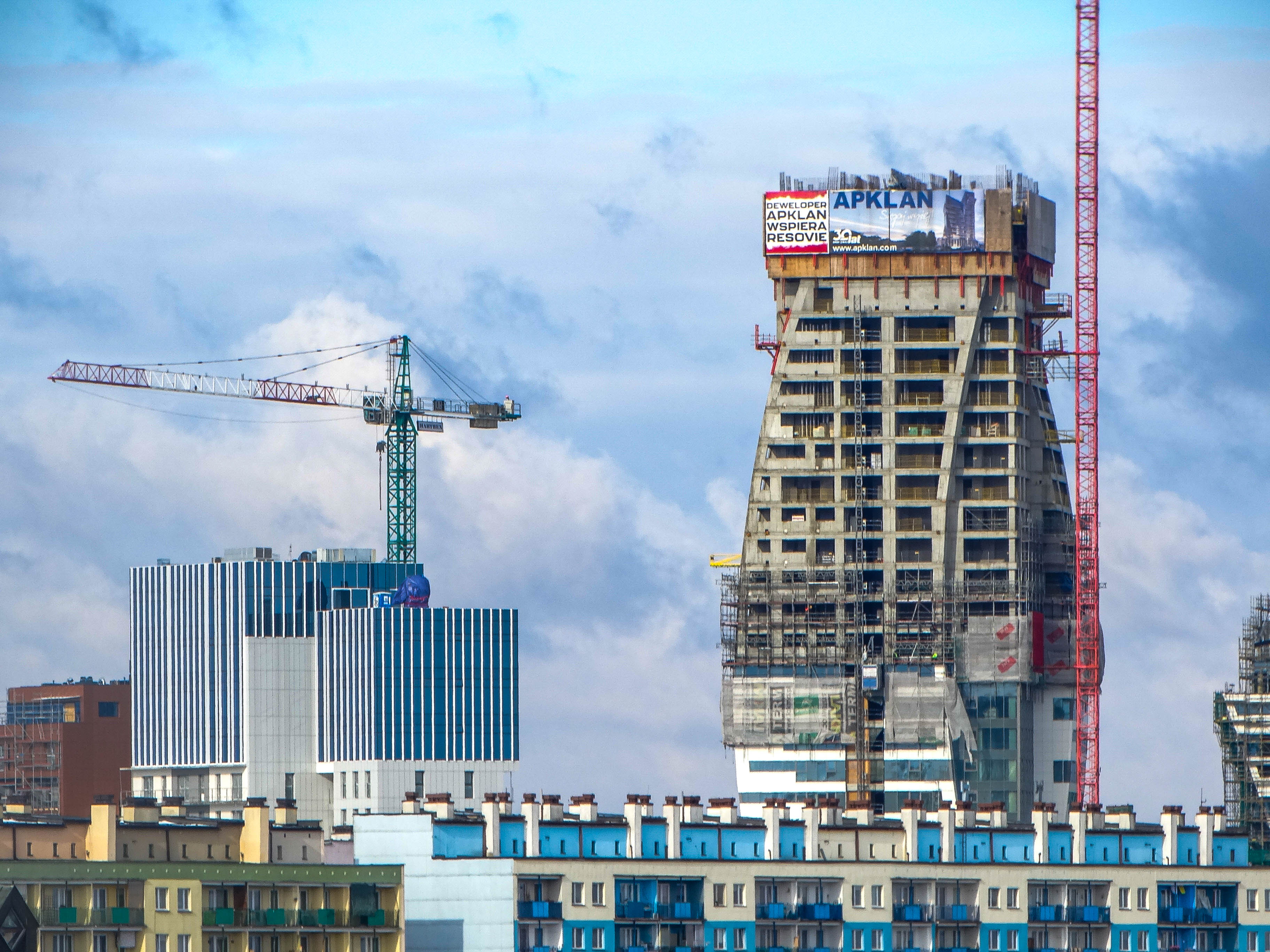
Olszynki Park during construction seen from Plaza shopping center

Construction of Olszynki Park began in July 2019. The tallest building of the site was topped out in August 2024 after finishing a spire installation using a Kaman K-MAX helicopter.

Planned height for the tallest tower of the site was changed multiple times throughout the planning and construction process. Initially, it was supposed to be 120 metres (390 ft) tall. A year later, the developer decided to change its height to 160 metres (520 ft). Eventually, Apklan decided the spire was to be installed on the roof that increased the building's height to 220.67 metres (724.0 ft).

Upon completion, Olszynki Park will become the tallest residential building in the country surpassing Sky Tower in Wrocław standing at 212 metres (696 ft) tall and Złota 44 in Warsaw at 192 metres (630 ft) tall.

== See also ==
- List of tallest buildings in Poland
