= Altus Skyscraper =

Architectural structure

Coordinates: 50°15′41.58″N 19°01′27.04″E

Altus (also known as Uni Centrum or Business Center 2000) is a highrise in Katowice, Silesia, Poland.

The construction started in 2001 and finished in 2003. The building is 125 m high and rises 30 floors above ground. Total floor area is 68,815 m^{2}, and volume is 270,430 m^{3}. The building surrounds a four-story atrium. One wing of the building has 18 stories and the other has 29.

Altus is an intelligent building, controlled centrally through a Building Management System. There are 18 elevators in the building.

The main tenants are a four-star hotel, a casino, a health club, and banks: PKO Bank Polski, Citibank, and Kredyt Bank. There is also a three-level underground parking that can fit 560 cars. Over 1,500 people work in the building.

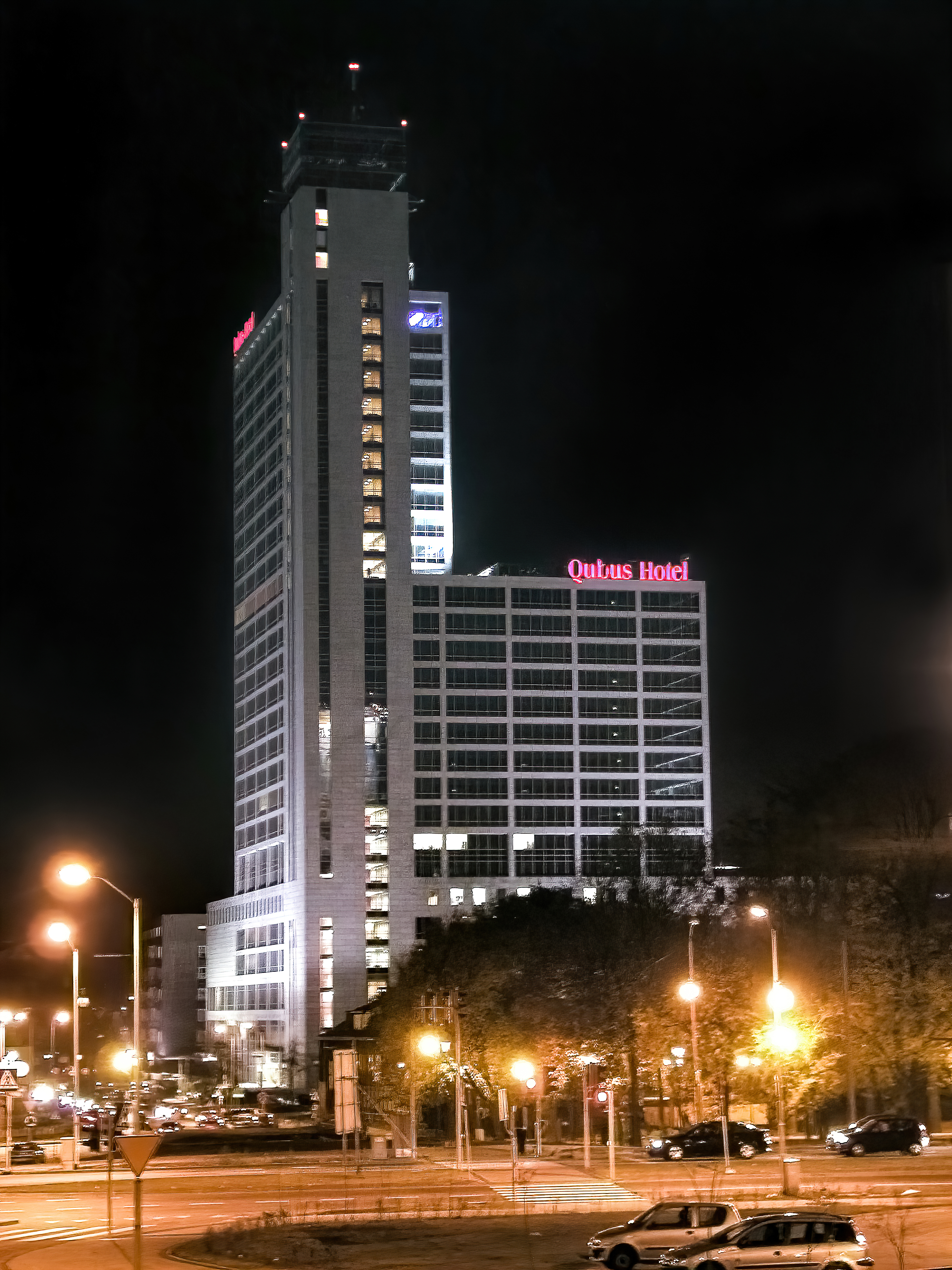
Altus skyscraper at night

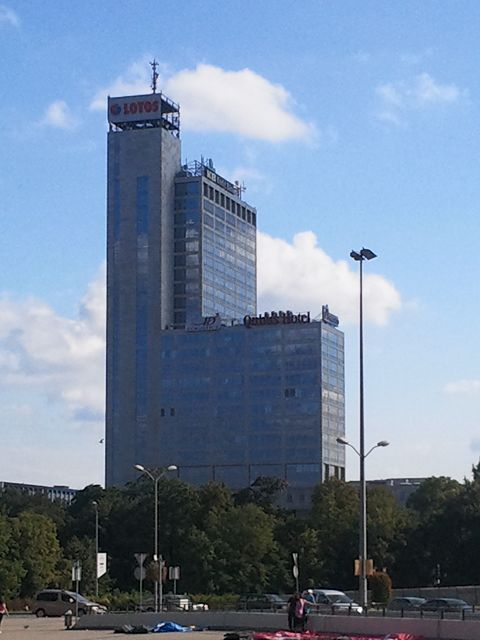
Altus skyscraper, 2011

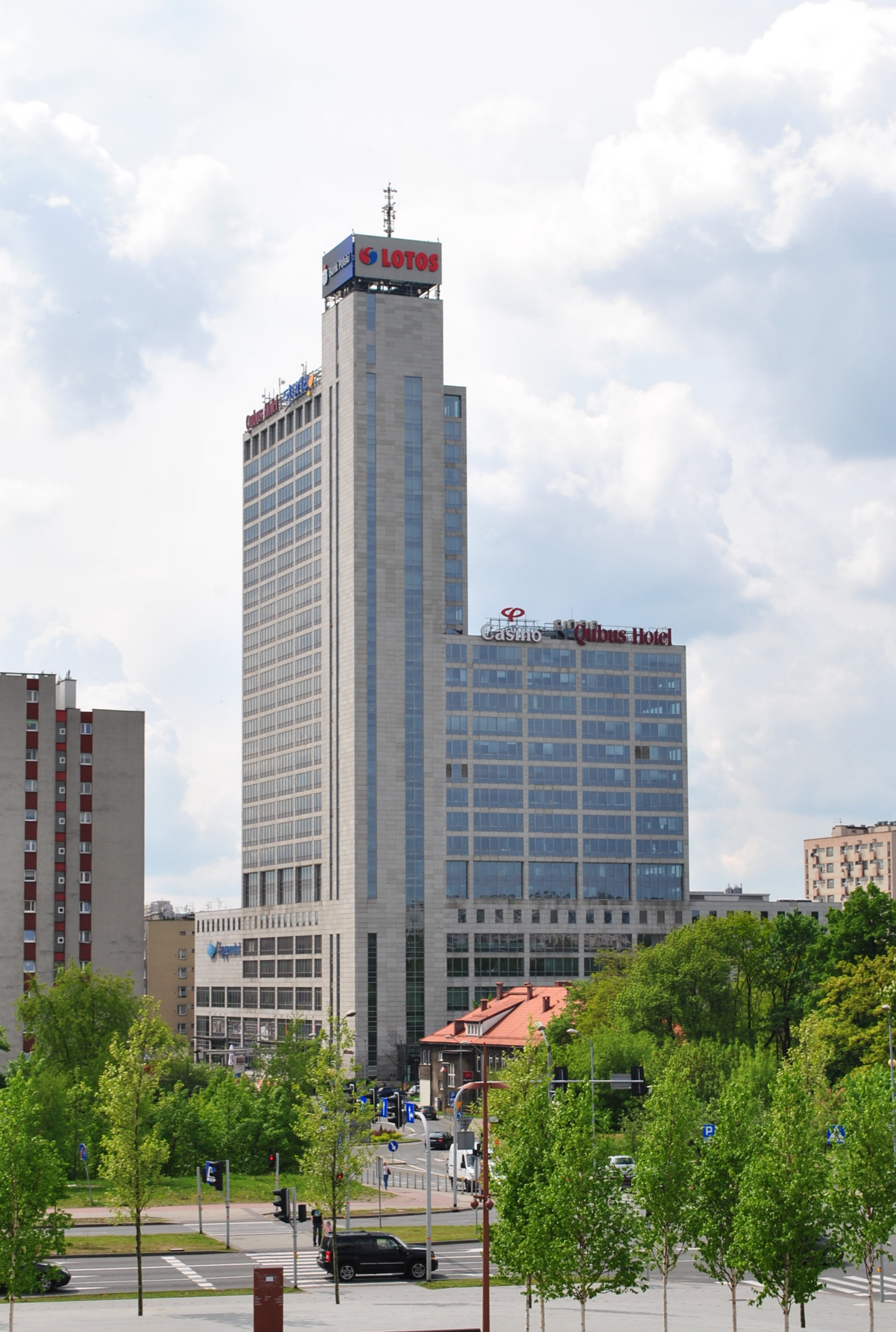
Altus in 2015

== See also ==
- List of tallest buildings in Poland
- List of tallest buildings in Katowice
