= Węglokoks =

Polish coal exporting company

- Type: public company
- Industry: coal
- Founded: 1951
- Headquarters: Stalexport Skyscrapers, Katowice, Poland
- Key people: Katarzyna Ranc-Dobrzańska, CEO
- Revenue: US$1.9 billion (2007)

Węglokoks is a Polish coal exporting company and the largest exporter of hard coal in Europe. The company was founded in 1951 as the Centre for Foreign Trade (Centrala Handlu Zagranicznego Węglokoks) and exports around 5-8 million tonnes of hard coal every year.
