= List of tallest buildings in Katowice =

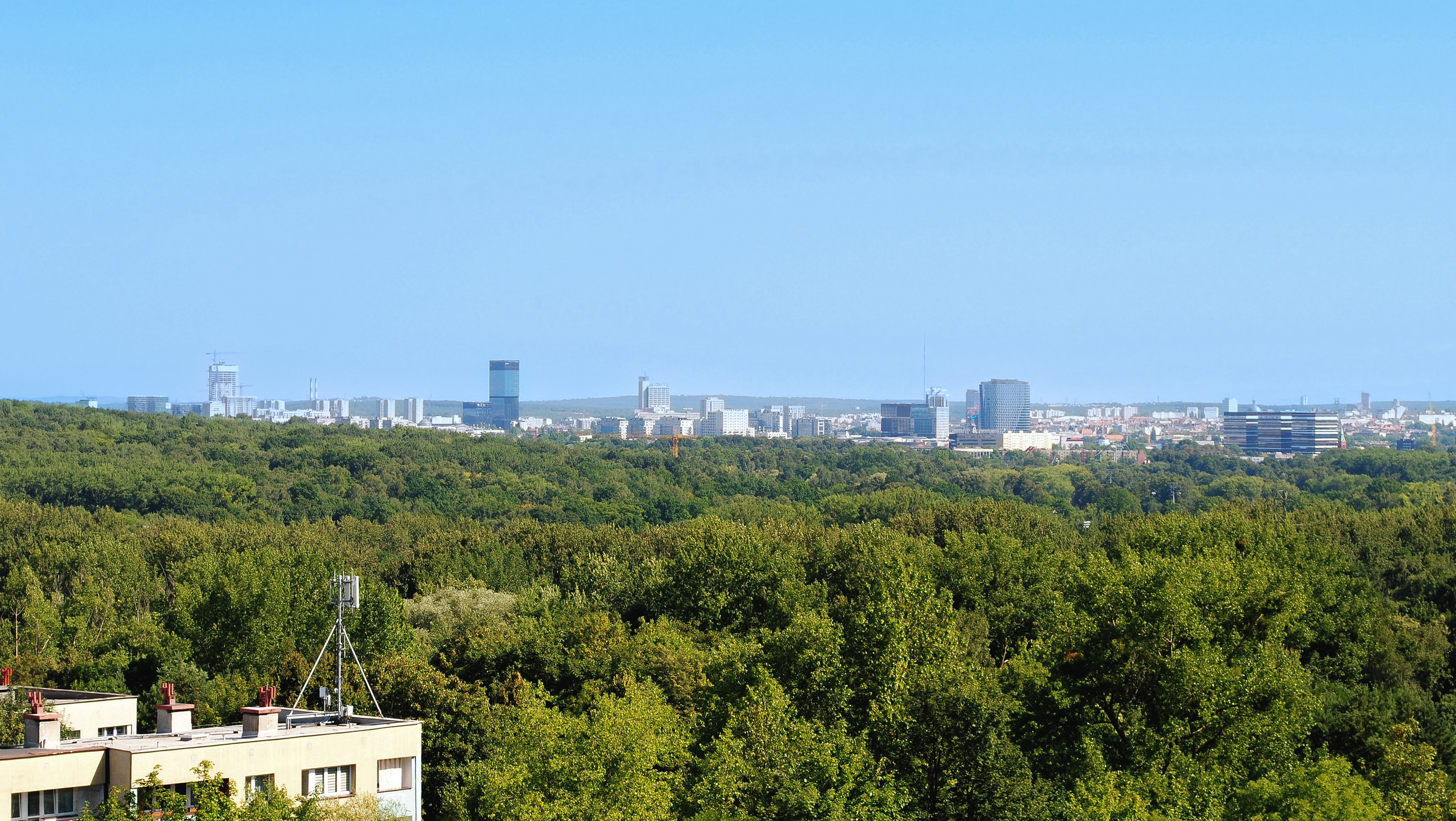
Skyline of Katowice as seen from a Headframe tower in Chorzów in 2023.

Katowice has 4 completed high-rise buildings that stand at least 100 metres (330 ft) tall. This makes the city contain the second most skyscrapers in Poland after Warsaw.

== Tallest buildings ==
This list ranks buildings in Katowice that stand at least 55 metres (180 ft) tall.

Rank	Name	Image	Height	Floors	Year	Location	Notes
1	KTW II		134 m (440 ft)	31	2022	1 Rożdzieńskiego Avenue	Tallest building in Katowice.
2	Altus		125 m (410 ft)	29	2003	13 Uniwersytecka Street	
3	Global Office Park A1		104 m (341 ft)	25	2022	Mickiewicza Street	
3	Global Office Park A2		104 m (341 ft)	25	2022	Mickiewicza Street	
5	Stalexport 1		97 m (318 ft)	22	1981	29 Mickiewicza Street	
6	Stalexport 2		92 m (302 ft)	20	1981	29 Mickiewicza Street	
7	Biurowiec Wojewódzki		90 m (300 ft)	22	1985	31 Wita Stwosza Street	
8	Global Office Park B		89 m (292 ft)	25	2023	Mickiewicza Street	
9	Kukurydza 1		85 m (279 ft)	24	1988	Osiedle Tysiąclecia	
10	Kukurydza 2		82 m (269 ft)	25	1989	Osiedle Tysiąclecia	
10	Kukurydza 3		82 m (269 ft)	25	1992	Osiedle Tysiąclecia	
12	Gwiazda 1		81 m (266 ft)	24	1978	Roździeńskiego Avenue	
12	Gwiazda 2		81 m (266 ft)	24	1978	Roździeńskiego Avenue	
12	Gwiazda 3		81 m (266 ft)	24	1978	Roździeńskiego Avenue	
12	Gwiazda 4		81 m (266 ft)	24	1978	Roździeńskiego Avenue	
12	Gwiazda 5		81 m (266 ft)	24	1978	Roździeńskiego Avenue	
12	Gwiazda 6		81 m (266 ft)	24	1978	Roździeńskiego Avenue	
12	Gwiazda 7		81 m (266 ft)	24	1978	Roździeńskiego Avenue	
19	Haperowiec		80 m (260 ft)	23		33 Sokolska Street	
	DOKP		80 m (260 ft)	17	1974	1 Roździeńskiego Avenue	Demolished in 2015.
20	Wieżowiec RMF FM		68 m (223 ft)	14		Francuska Street	
21	KTW I		66 m (217 ft)	14	2018	1 Rożdzieńskiego Avenue	
21	Face2Face Business Campus		66 m (217 ft)	15	2020	2 & 4 Żelazna Street	
23	Sokolska 30 Tower A		63 m (207 ft)	17	2021	30 Sokolska Street	
23	Sokolska 30 Tower B		63 m (207 ft)	17	2021	30 Sokolska Street	
25	Ślizgowiec		60 m (200 ft)	18	1968	Korfantego Avenue	
25	Górnik I		60 m (200 ft)	17	1965	65 Katowicka Street	
25	Drapacz Chmur		60 m (200 ft)	14	1934	15 Żwirki i Wigury Street	
28	Chorzowska 50		57 m (187 ft)	13	2002	50 Chorzowska Street	
29	Kukurydza 4		56 m (184 ft)	16		Osiedle Tysiąclecia	
29	Kukurydza 5		56 m (184 ft)	16		Osiedle Tysiąclecia	
29	GIG Office Point		56 m (184 ft)	13		Korfantego Avenue	
32	Silesia Business Park A		55 m (180 ft)	12	2018	152 Chorzowska Street	
32	Silesia Business Park B		55 m (180 ft)	12	2018	152 Chorzowska Street	
32	Silesia Business Park C		55 m (180 ft)	12	2018	152 Chorzowska Street	
32	Silesia Business Park D		55 m (180 ft)	12	2018	152 Chorzowska Street	
32	Craft		55 m (180 ft)	14	2023	105 Chorzowska Street	

== Under construction ==
This list ranks buildings under construction in Katowice that plan to stand at least 55 metres (180 ft) tall.

Name	Image	Height	Floors	Construction started	Estimated completion	Location	Notes
Atal Olimpijska B		128 m (420 ft)	36	2022	2026	Olimpijska Street	
Atal Sky+ A		121 m (397 ft)	35	2021	2026	Wojciecha Korfantego Avenue	
Atal Olimpijska A		60 m (200 ft)	18	2022	2026	Olimpijska Street	
Atal Olimpijska C		60 m (200 ft)	18	2022	2026	Olimpijska Street	
Mikato 1		59 m (194 ft)	18	2025	2026	Piotra Skargi Street	

== Proposed ==
This list ranks proposed buildings in Katowice that would stand at least 100 metres (330 ft) tall.

Name	Height	Floors	Year
Centrum Multifunkcyjne	200 m (660 ft)	49	
Black Tower	168 m (551 ft)	46	2027
LC-Corp Tower	106 m (348 ft)	27	
KCB Residential	101 m (331 ft)	27	

== See also ==
- List of tallest buildings in Poland
