= Stalexport Skyscrapers =

Coordinates: 50°15′48.30″N 19°00′48.00″E

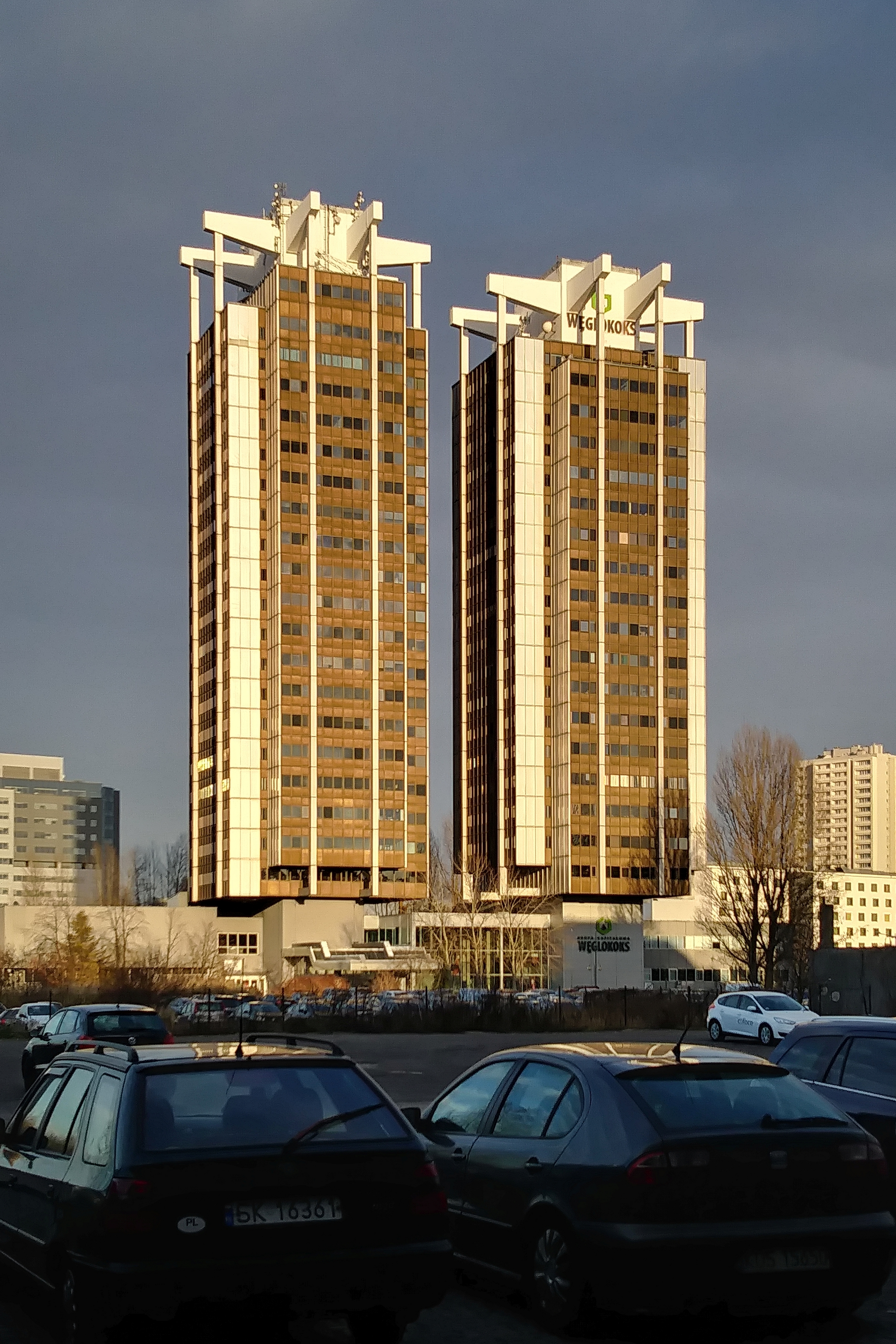
Stalexport Skyscrapers (2018)

The Stalexport skyscrapers are twin skyscrapers (Tower A and Tower B) located in Katowice, Silesia, Poland. The buildings share a three-story base. They were designed by Yugoslavian architect Georg Gruićić in the late 1970s and finished in 1981 and 1982, respectively.

When built, they were the tallest buildings in Poland, outside the capital, Warsaw. They were designed to accommodate 1800 people. The towers were originally constructed to house the headquarters of the Centre for Foreign Trade, and its successor Węglokoks is still headquartered there today.

The total floor area is 27,183 m².

The buildings are primarily used for office space, and are home to a number of international corporations and financial institution and contain over 700 offices. They are also known for their unique, modern design, which features sharp angles and a facade of steel, glass, and granite.

At the time of constitution these buildings were the tallest buildings in Poland outside of Warsaw.

== Technical data ==
- Height: A: 97 m, B: 92 m
- Floors: A: 21, B: 19
- Construction finished: A: 1981, B: 1982

== See also ==
- List of tallest buildings in Katowice
