= KTW (Katowice) =

Office complex in Katowice, Poland

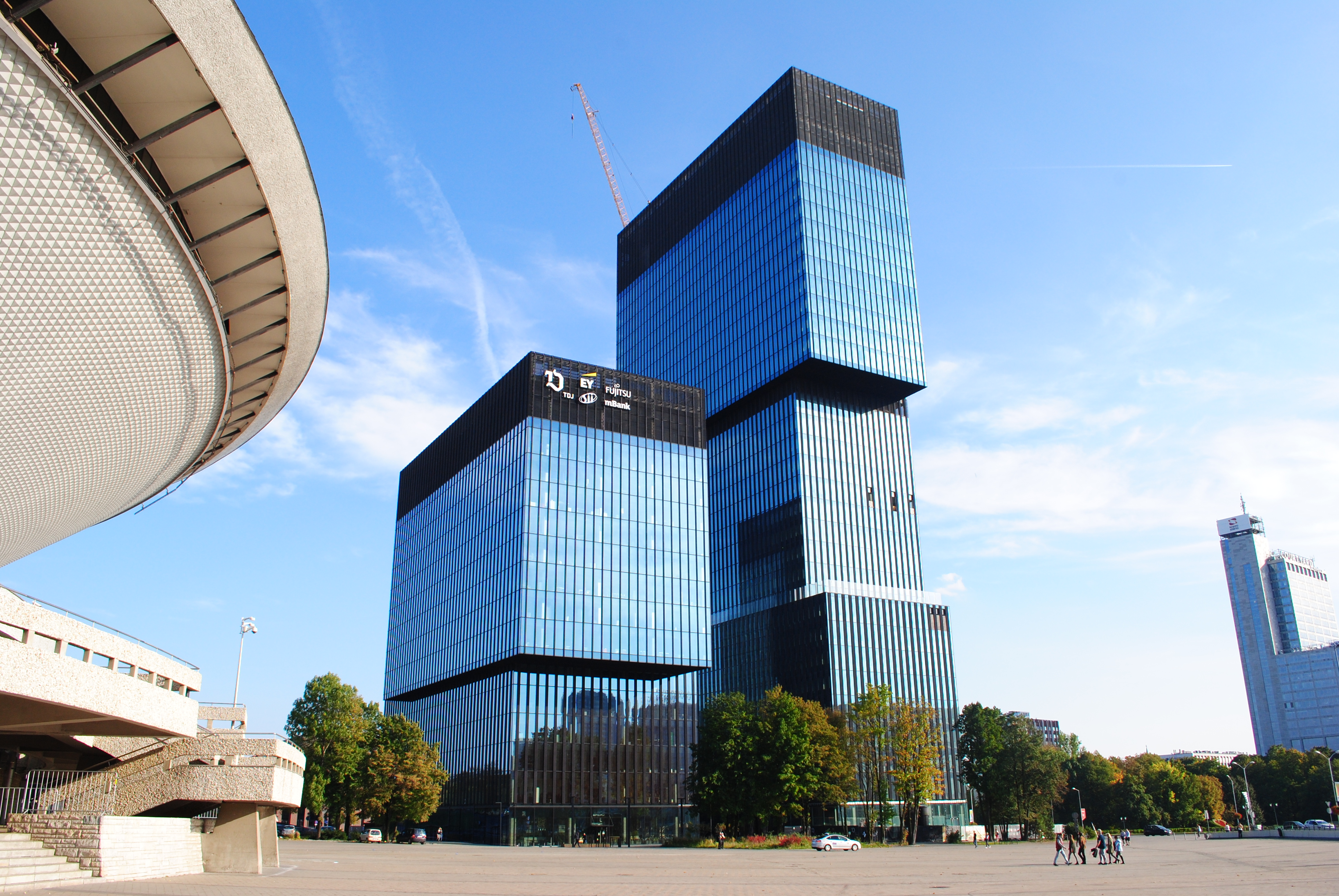
- KTW in October 2021
- Interactive map of the KTW area
- Alternative names: .KTW

General information
- Status: Completed
- Type: Office
- Architectural style: Neomodern
- Location: Katowice, Poland, al. Roździeńskiego 1 40-202
- Coordinates: 50°15′53″N 19°01′33.6″E
- Construction started: KTW I: June 2016; KTW II: November 2019
- Completed: KTW I: March 2018; KTW II: February 2022

Height
- Height: KTW I: 66 m (217 ft); KTW II: 134 m (440 ft)

Technical details
- Floor count: KTW I: 14; KTW II: 31
- Floor area: 58,150 m^{2} (625,900 sq ft) (office); 3,660 m^{2} (39,400 sq ft) (retail)

Design and construction
- Architects: Przemo Łukasik; Łukasz Zagała
- Architecture firm: Medusa Group
- Developer: TDJ Estate

Website
- ktw.com.pl/en/

KTW (also .KTW) is a complex of two high-rise buildings in Katowice, Poland. KTW I, the first building of the project, was completed in 2018 at 66 metres (217 ft). The second tower, KTW II, rises 134 metres (440 ft) and was finished in 2022; it is the tallest building in Katowice and in the Upper Silesia region.

KTW is located at Aleja Roździeńskiego, in the Koszutka district. As part of Katowice's Culture Zone (Strefa Kultury), the complex lies near the Spodek arena, the Polish National Radio Symphony Orchestra and the International Congress Centre. TDJ Estate developed the complex, while Przemo Łukasik and Łukasz Zagała from Medusa Group were in charge of the architectural concept.

== History ==
=== Planning ===
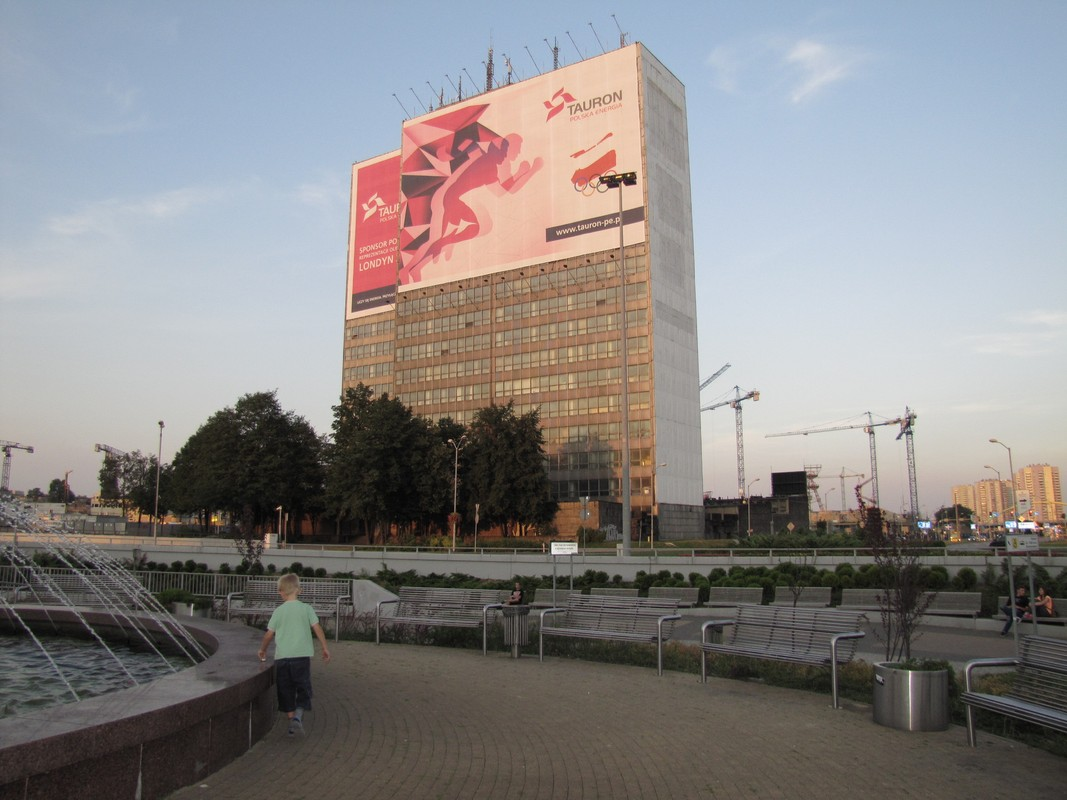
The former DOKP building in August 2012

In the years 1965–1974, an 18-storey high-rise had been built in the place of the present KTW for the use of the State Railways Directorate in Katowice. The building, DOKP (officially Budynek Dyrekcji Kolei Państwowych w Katowicach), was the tallest in Katowice at the time of its commissioning.

In 2010, the Polish State Railways decided to rebuild the existing office building. Together with Hines Poland, they planned a thorough reconstruction and extension of the DOKP and the construction of a second office building with 32 storeys and a height of about 125 metres (410 ft) right next to it. The buildings would be named Rondo Towers and designed by German architect Helmut Jahn.

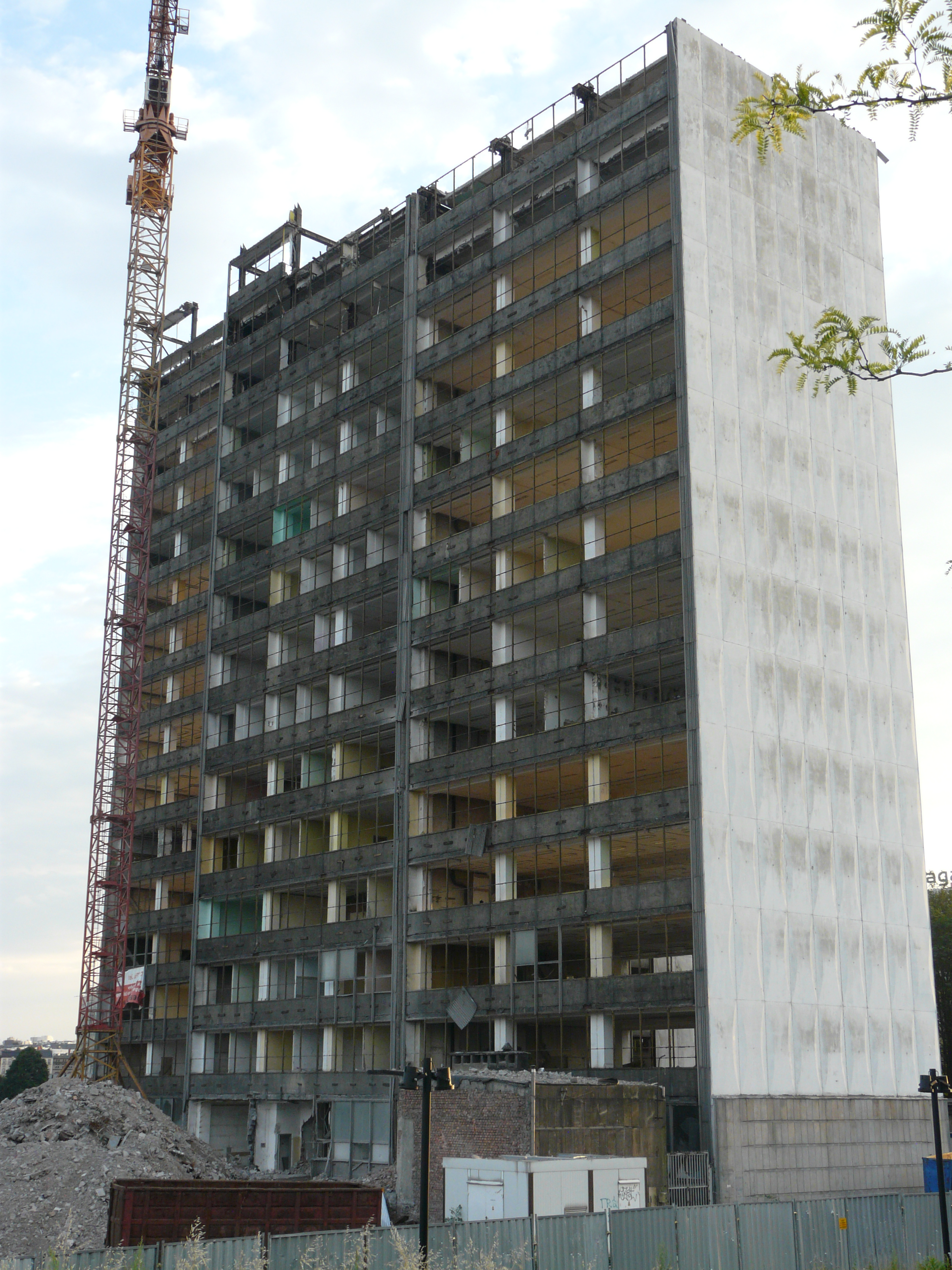
DOKP building under demolition in July 2015

The last tenants of the DOKP moved out in 2011. Eventually, after changes in the scope of the planned investment, the contract with Hines Poland expired. At the end of July 2013, the DOKP building was put up for sale.

On 7 November 2013, the building was sold in a second tender for PLN 29 million. Two companies participated in the tender, and the new owner of the DOKP building was announced as being TDJ Estate. On 13 March 2014, permission was obtained to demolish the building and, on 16 December 2014, preparatory work for the demolition of this part of the high-rise began in the one-story DOKP pavilion. The demolition was finished in June 2015.

In November 2014, information appeared that two skyscrapers with a height of 115 and 50 metres (377 and 164 ft) were to be built in the place of the DOKP, and the architecture firm Medusa Group would be responsible for the project. Renovation of the existing building was also considered at that time. To design the complex, TDJ Estate invited several architectural studios to a closed competition, in which the concept of the Medusa Group was selected for implementation.

=== Construction of KTW I ===
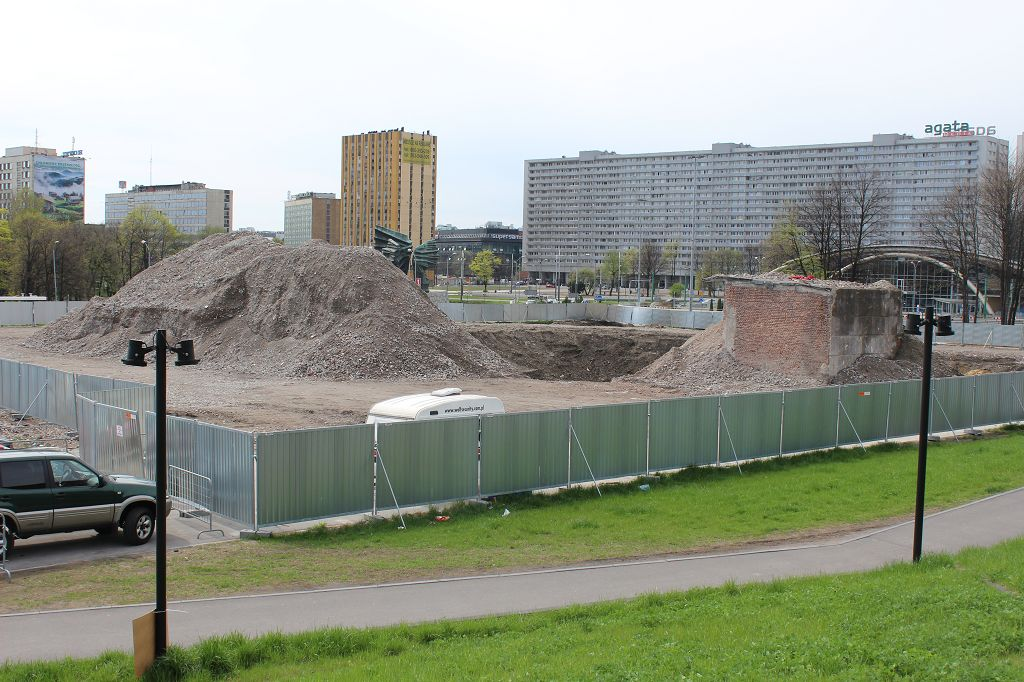
Construction site of KTW after the demolition of the DOKP, April 2016

In October 2015, TDJ Estate announced a tender procedure for the general contractor of the first high-rise. On 31 March 2016, the name and logotype were presented. The name chosen, "KTW", stands for an abbreviation of the city of Katowice. During the VIII European Economic Congress held in Katowice on 19 May 2016, the official presentation of the project took place. In June 2016, the tender for the general contractor of the first stage of KTW was settled, under which Strabag was selected. The contractor took over the construction site in the same month.

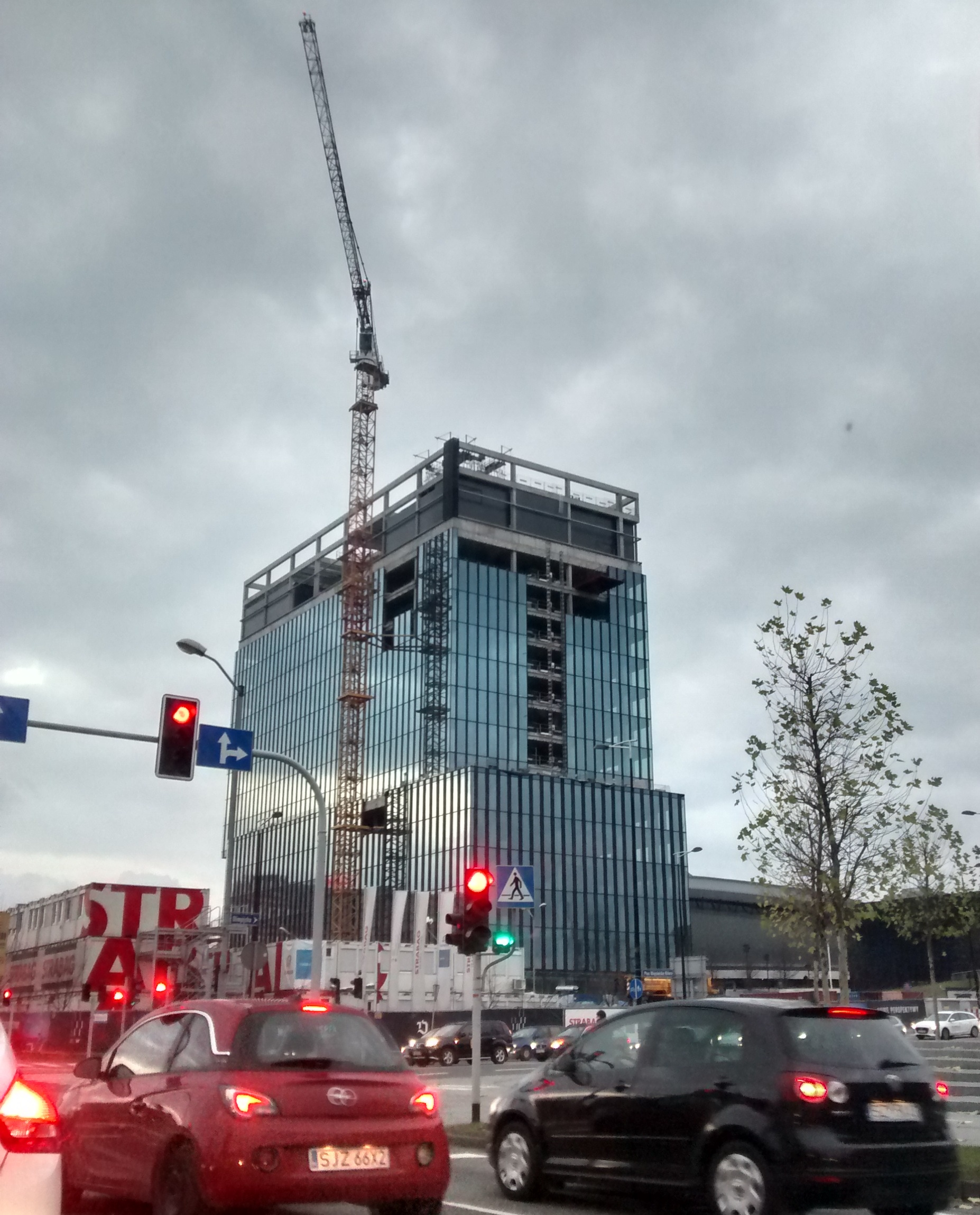
Construction of KTW I in November 2017

On 16 February 2017, the official cornerstone laying ceremony was held. The ceremony was attended by Marcin Krupa, the mayor of Katowice, and Tomasz Domagała, the CEO of TDJ Estate. By then, earthworks, foundation slabs and diaphragm walls had been completed, and advanced work was underway on underground levels. By the end of March, works on the underground floors were completed and four above-ground floors of KTW I had been finished. At that time, the average construction time for one floor was about three weeks.

In May 2017, the assembly of the building's facade began. In September 2017, the KTW I building reached its highest structural point and the topping out ceremony was held on 5 September. In February 2018, Colliers International became the manager of the KTW I building. After the inspection by the state services, on 26 March 2018, the KTW I building received an occupancy permit. By that time, KTW I had been commercialised in 60%, with Ernst & Young as the first tenant and Fujitsu as the largest tenant. The building's inauguration was held in June 2018.

=== Construction of KTW II ===
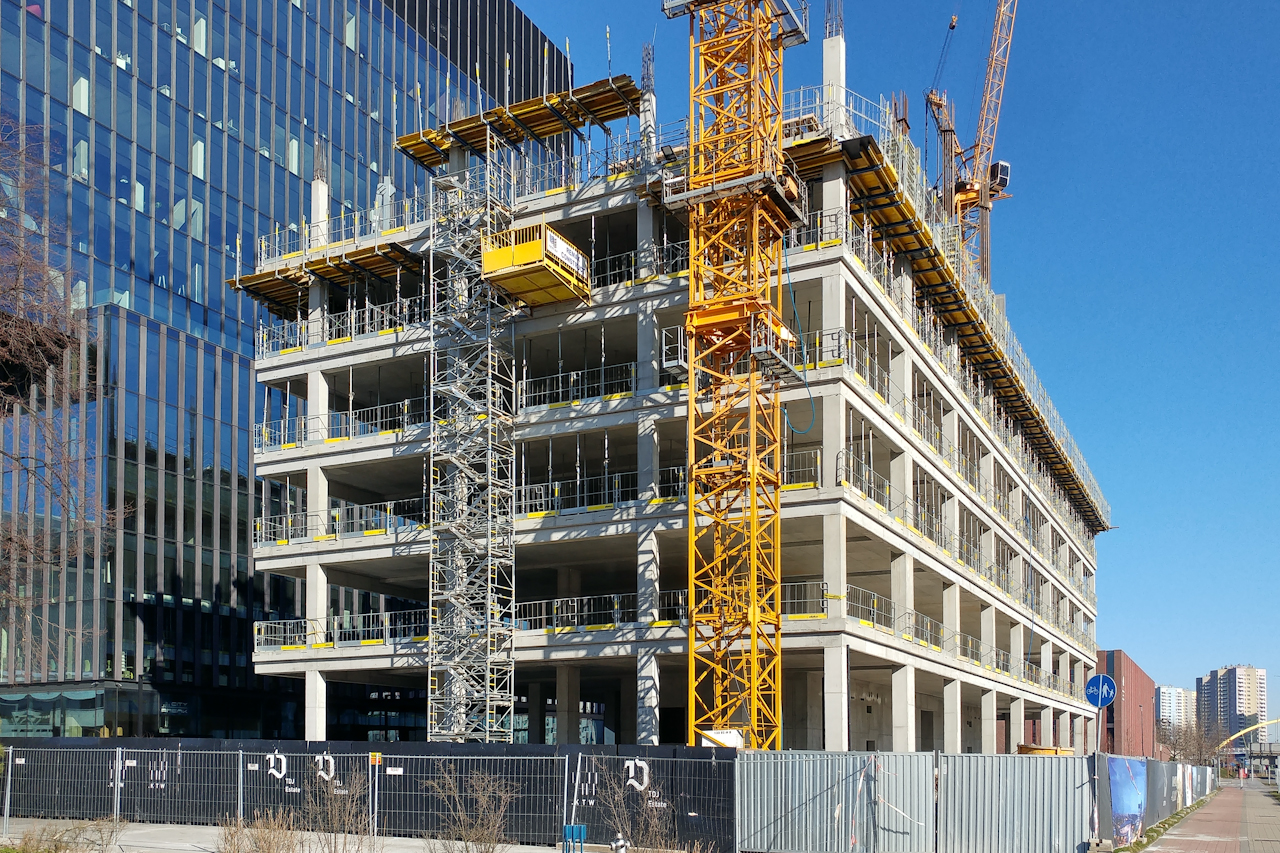
KTW II in its initial stage of construction, March 2020

In April 2019, TDJ Estate selected the company Gleeds to be responsible for the management and supervision of the second stage of the KTW complex. A tender was also announced for the contractor of the skyscraper. This company also took over the function of the investor's supervision inspector. In October 2019, preparatory work was underway on KTW II and by mid-November the construction started.

In July 2020, the structure of the building reached 60 metres (200 ft). In November of the same year, work was underway on the last office floors. Work was also carried out on the assembly of facade panels, which covered two of the three cuboids of the building in their entirety. In December 2020, the structure of the skyscraper was 115 metres (377 ft) and the last usable floor was being built.

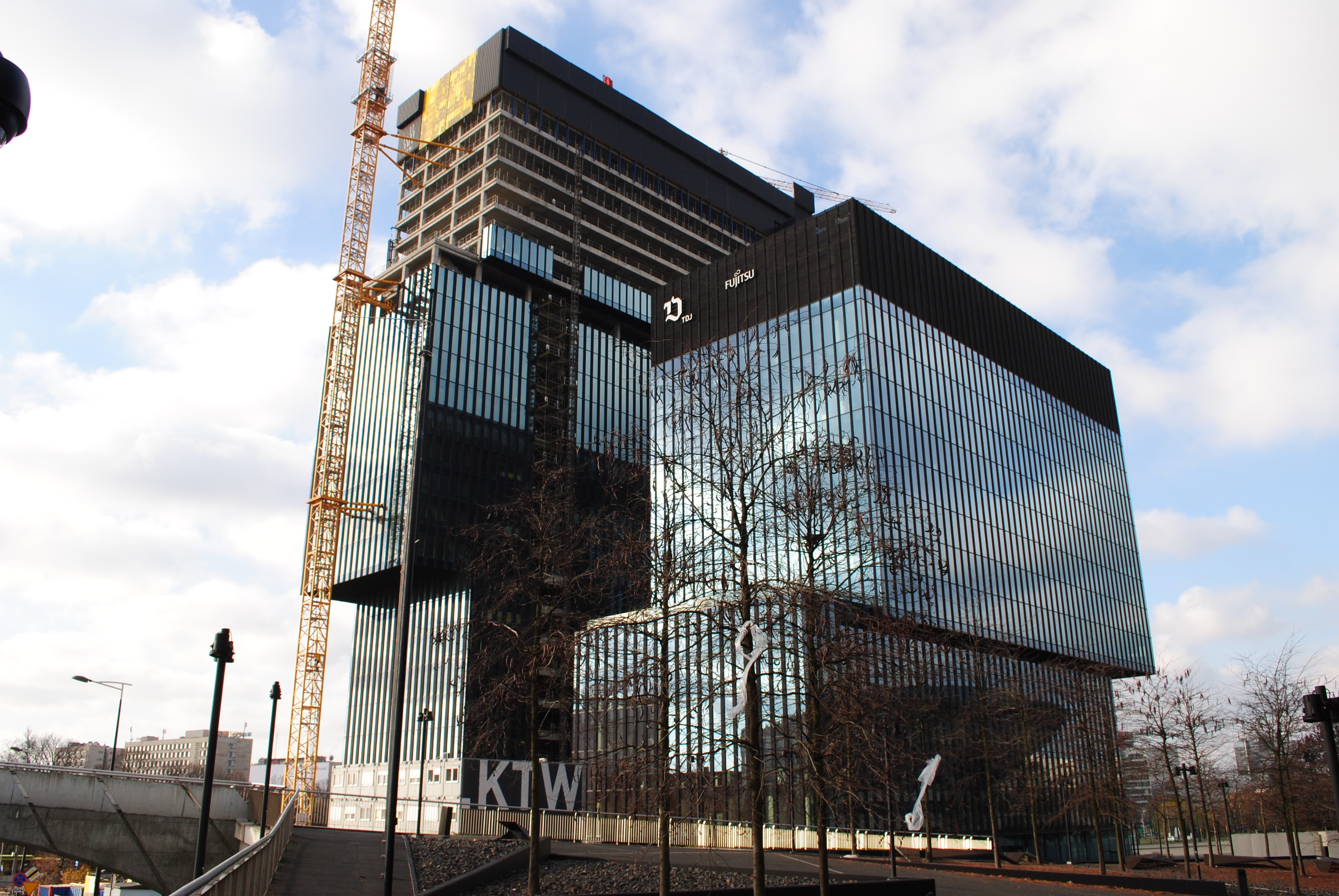
KTW complex in November 2020

At the turn of February and March 2021, the roof of KTW II was topped out, becoming the tallest building in both Katowice and in the Upper Silesia region. At that time, about 300 workers were involved in the construction and the first tenant of KTW II was announced as being the firm PwC. In July 2021, the Swiss company LKQ Europe, belonging to the LKQ Corporation, was also announced as one of the building's tenants.

On 1 August 2021, three people jumped with a parachute from the roof of the KTW II skyscraper after climbing onto the roof using a crane. KTW II was completed in February 2022, with its occupancy permit being obtained on 11 February.

== Architecture ==
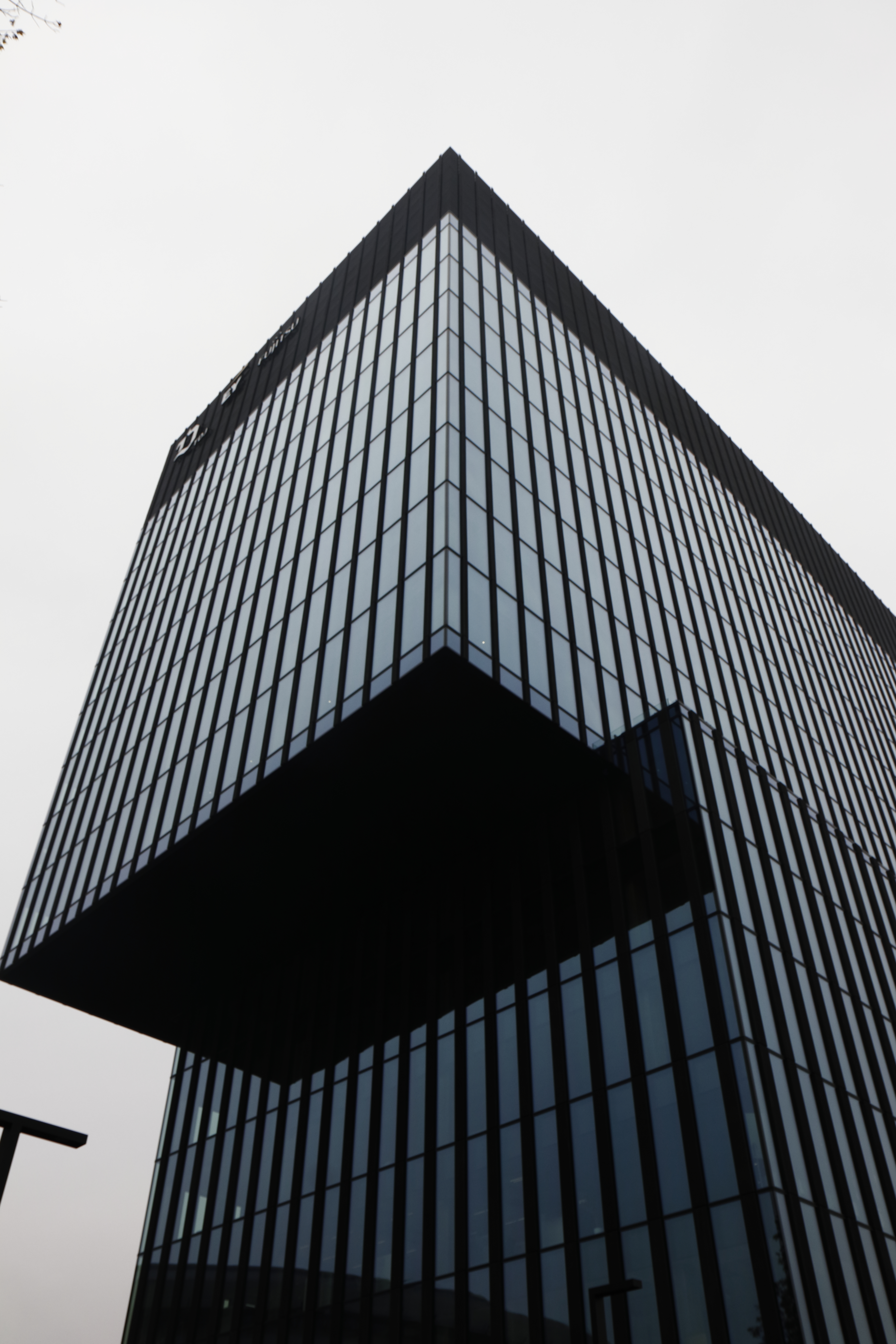
Fragment of KTW I as seen from the southwest

The KTW complex was designed by architects Przemo Łukasik and Łukasz Zagała from the Medusa Group studio. Warsaw-based Studio Profil was responsible for the facade design of the buildings, while the construction was held by the Firma Inżynierska STATYK from Katowice and the installations by CE Group from Gliwice.

The prototype for the architectural concept was the complex De Rotterdam, located in Rotterdam, the Netherlands.

The buildings have the form of cuboids shifted relative to each other; KTW I features two cuboids and KTW II three. In KTW I, the shift was applied between the sixth and seventh floors, at a height of about 24 metres (79 ft). The upper block is 42 metres (138 ft) high, and the last two floors are intended for technical infrastructure. In KTW II, storey overhangs are located between the eighth and ninth and 19th and 20th floors.

The glass facade of the building is covered with panels of selective glass, prefabricated concrete and metal frames. KTW II has a total of 4,400 panels, each weighting approximately 500 kilograms.

The windows of the office buildings are 135 cm (53 in) wide and separated by dark vertical stripes made of precast concrete elements with grooves. The width of the lanes in the KTW I building is 40 cm (16 in) in the lower segment and 20 cm (7.9 in) in the upper one; in KTW II it is 60 and 40 and 20 cm (23.6 and 15.7 and 7.9 in) from the bottom, respectively. The upper technical floors are covered with black expanded metal.

== Facilities ==
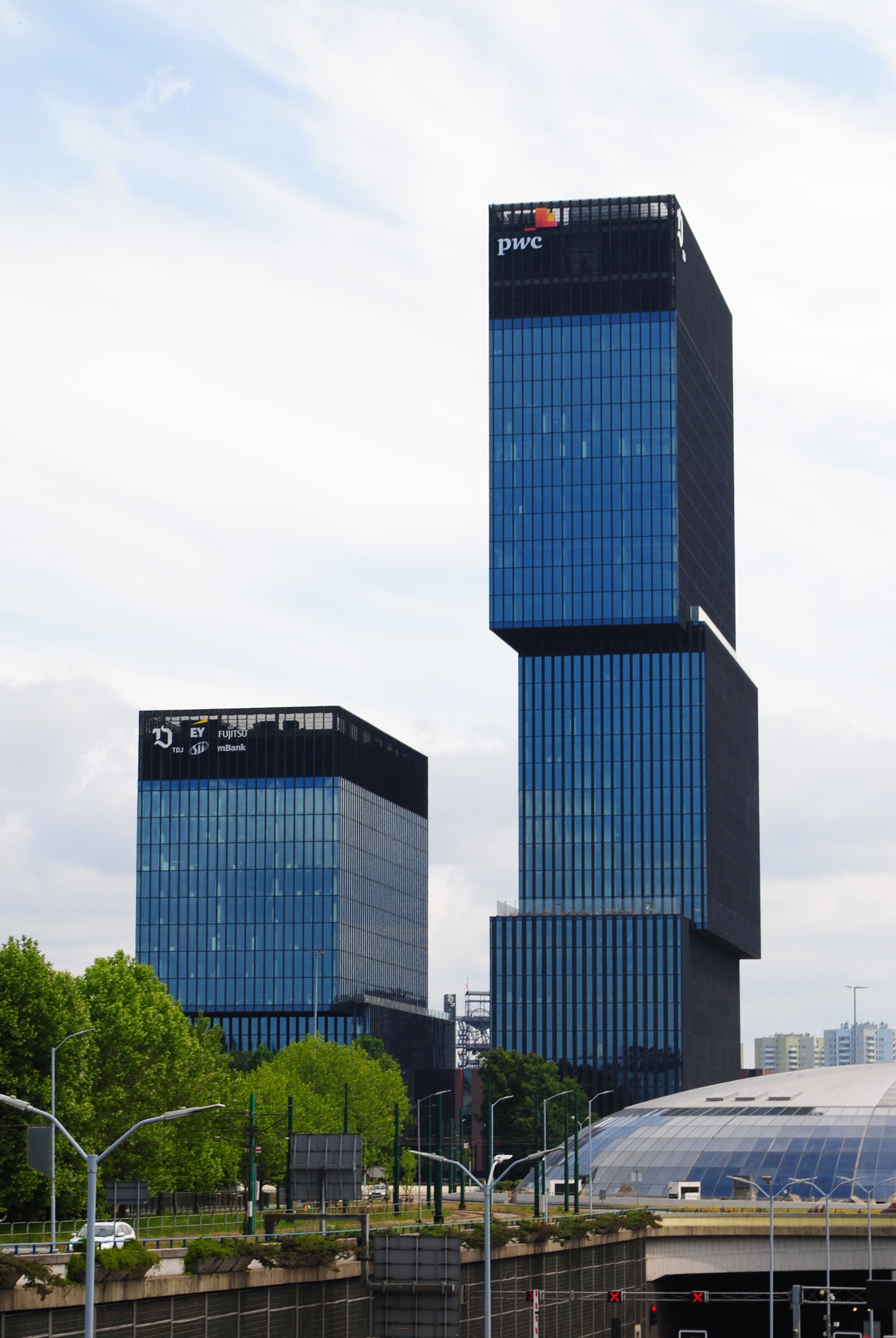
KTW in June 2023

KTW I is 66 metres (217 ft) high; it consists of 14 above-ground and three underground floors, with 18,250 m^{2} (196,400 sq ft) of office space and 1,560 m^{2} (16,800 sq ft) of retail space. KTW II is 134 metres (440 ft) high and consists of 31 above-ground and three underground floors, with an office space of 39,900 m^{2} (429,000 sq ft) and a retail space of 2,100 m^{2} (23,000 sq ft). The average floor area of KTW I is 1,480 m^{2} (15,900 sq ft), while of KTW II is 1,410 m^{2} (15,200 sq ft).

241 parking spaces have been designed for KTW I and 219 for KTW II. There are six and 12 elevators in the buildings, respectively. Elevators in each of the buildings are located in a centrally located shaft. The elevator travel time from level -3 to floor 31 in the KTW II skyscraper is 35 seconds.

The KTW complex includes a reception lobby, a canteen, a cafe, a kiosk and a medical centre.

== Tenants ==
In July 2021, the tenants of the KTW I building were the following companies: Fujitsu, Bank Handlowy, Ernst & Young, mBank, Gastromall Group, Teleperformance Poland and Świat Prasy.

The company PwC moved into the KTW II building at the beginning of 2023, occupying nine floors.

== See also ==
- List of tallest buildings in Katowice
- List of tallest buildings in Poland
- De Rotterdam – complex with similar architecture in Rotterdam, the Netherlands
