= Sea Towers =

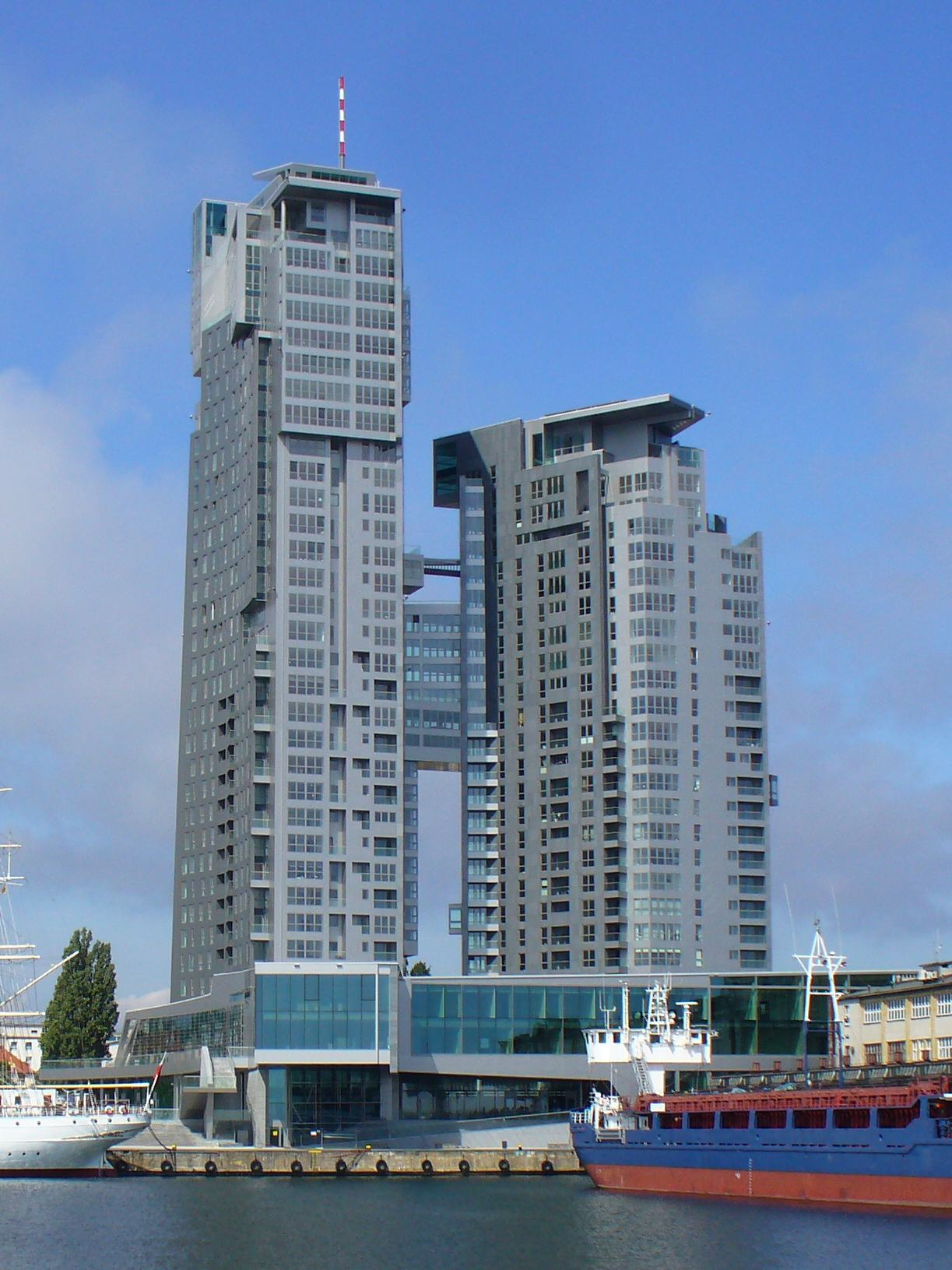
- Sea Towers, Gdynia
- Interactive map of the Sea Towers area

General information
- Status: Completed
- Type: mixed-use
- Location: Gdynia, Poland
- Coordinates: 54°31′18″N 18°32′56″E
- Construction started: 10 May 2006
- Estimated completion: February 2009
- Opening: 28 February 2009

Height
- Antenna spire: 144 m (473 ft)
- Roof: 127 m (417 ft)

Design and construction
- Developer: Invest Komfort SA

The two-tower skyscraper Sea Towers is a mixed-use complex on the Gdynia waterfront, Poland, 50 metres from the main port of Gdynia developed by Invest Komfort SA. Tourist attractions such as the beach, boardwalk and retired Polish WWII naval ship ORP Błyskawica (lightning) are all within walking distance. Construction commenced on 10 May 2006 and was completed on 28 February 2009. At 143.6 metres, Sea Towers is the 14th tallest building in Poland and the second tallest residential building in the country. Apartments are for sale, and the complex can double as a hotel. There is a viewing terrace on floor 32, the top floor of the taller tower.

== See also ==
- List of tallest buildings in Poland
