= Ilmet =

Skyscraper in Warsaw, Poland

Coordinates: 52.2319°N 20.9978°E

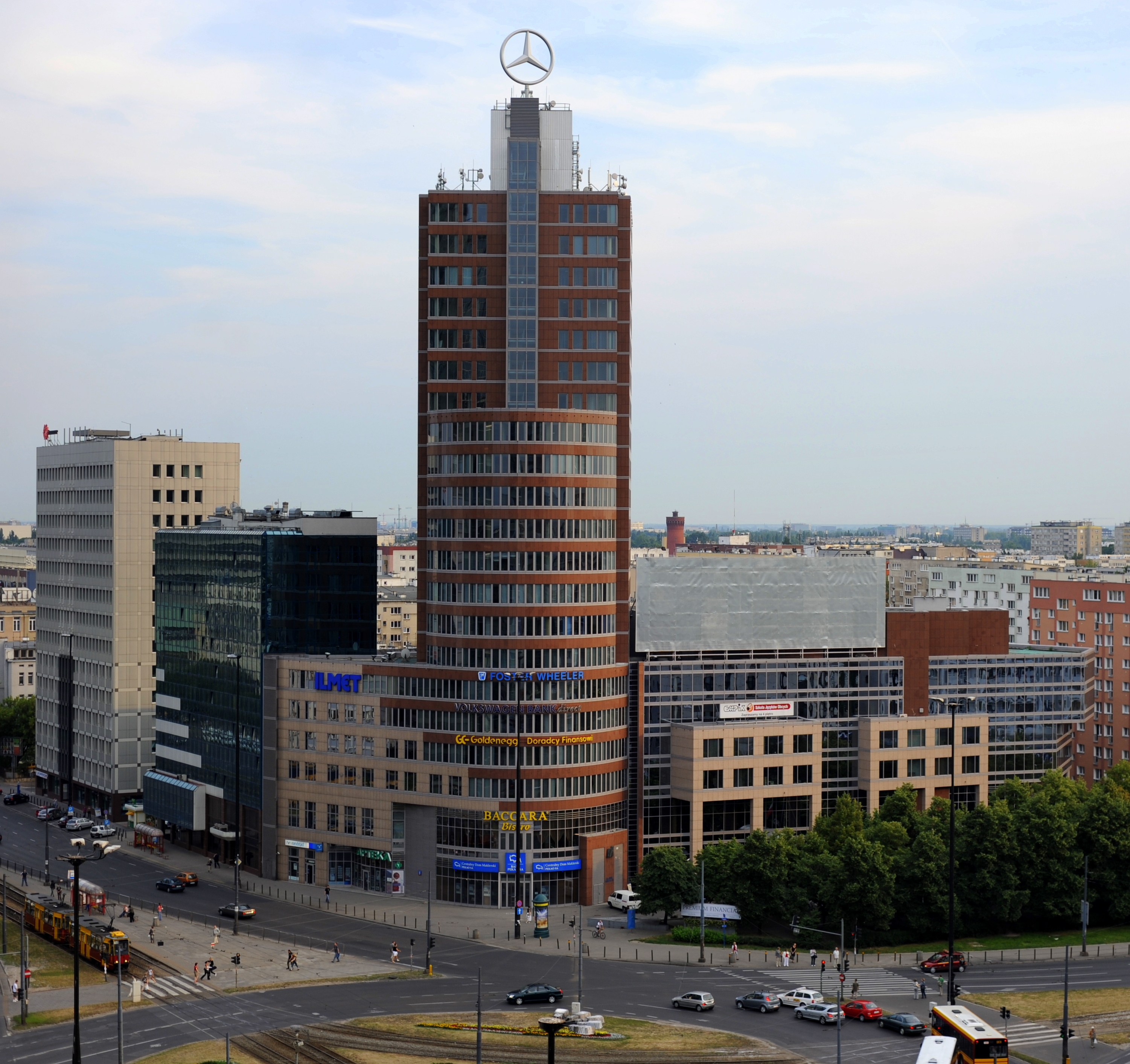

General information
- Location: Warsaw, Poland
- Address: 15 aleja Jana Pawła II
- Completed: 1997
- Owner: UBS Real Estate
- Height: 103m

Technical details
- Floor count: 22
- Floor area: 19,150 m^{2}

Design and construction
- Architect(s): Miljenko Dumencic, Mirosław Kartowicz

Ilmet is a skyscraper in Warsaw, Poland. It was finished in 1997. In mid-2010s plans for its demolishing have been announced. In March 2022 the building became one of humanitarian aid centers for Ukrainian refugees.
