= Organika Trade =

Skyscraper office building in Gdańsk, Poland

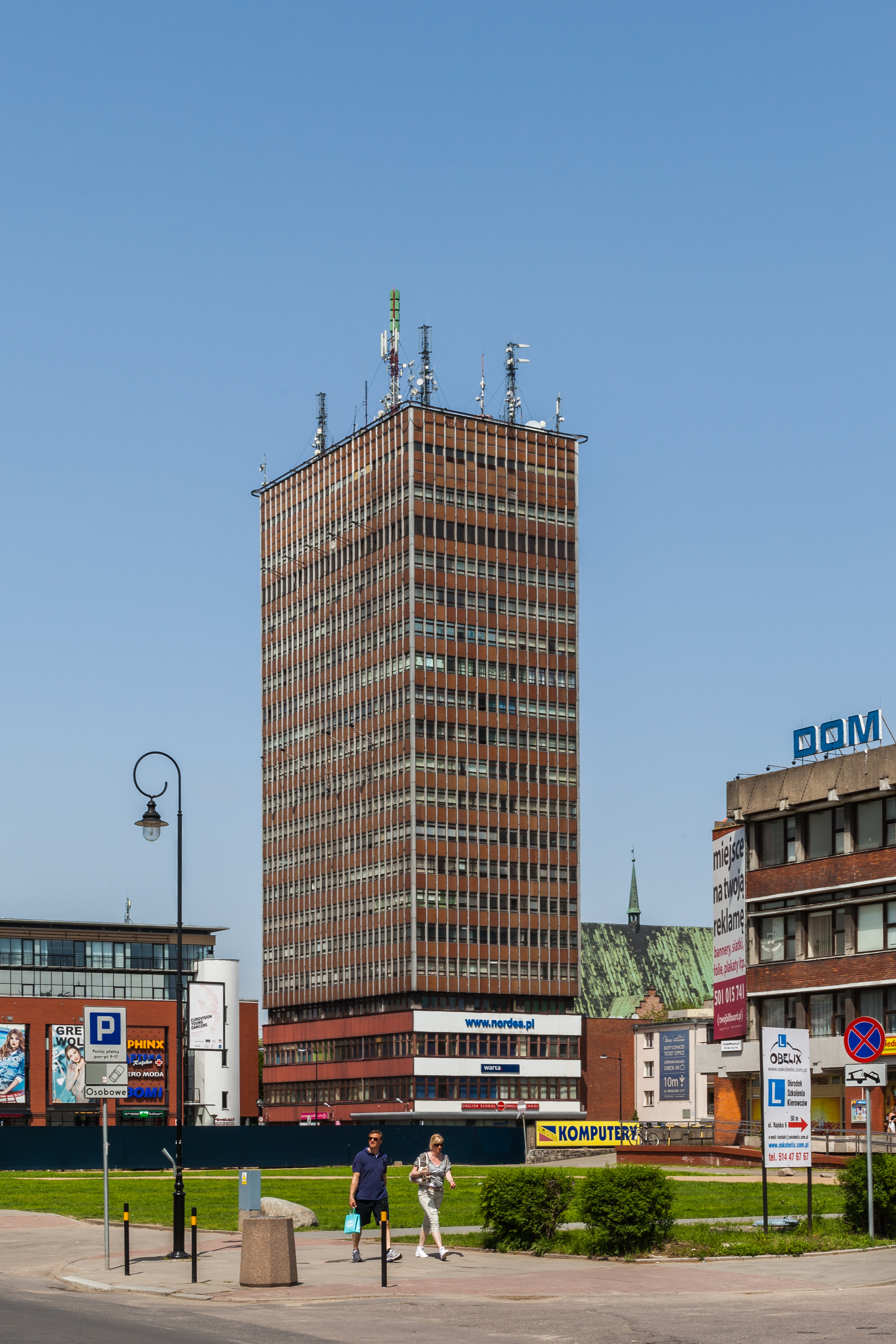
- The building in 2013
- Interactive map of the Organika Trade area

General information
- Type: Office skyscraper
- Location: Gdańsk, Poland, 11 Heweliusza Street
- Coordinates: 54°21′23.5″N 18°38′59.7″E
- Construction started: 1975
- Completed: 1980

Height
- Tip: 97 m (318 ft)
- Roof: 80 m (260 ft)

Technical details
- Floor count: 20
- Floor area: 12,640 m^{2} (136,100 ft^{2})

Organika Trade is a skyscraper office building in Gdańsk, Poland, located at 11 Heweliusza Street, within the Old Town neighbourhood of the Sródmieście district. The building is 80 metres (260 ft) tall when measured up to the roof, and 97 m (318 ft) tall overall. It was opened in 1980.

== Architectural specifications ==
The building is 80 metres (260 ft) tall when measured up to the roof, and 97 m (318 ft) tall overall. It has 20 floors, and of its floor area of 12,640 m^{2} (136,100 ft^{2}), approximately 10,000 m^{2} (110,000 ft^{2}) is dedicated to office space, whereas 300 m^{2} (3,200 ft^{2}) is used for other commercial space, i.e. shops and other services.

== History ==
Construction of the building (previously known as Navimor and Prorem) started in 1975 and concluded in 1980. It was renovated from 1998 to 2000. With a height of 80 metres (260 ft), it was the tallest building in Gdańsk before it was surpassed by Centrum Biurowe Neptun in 2014. In March 1981, a man named Radek Cieśluk successfully jumped from the building with a hang glider.

A proposal was put forward in 2013 to construct a building on Organika Trade's site at a height of 200 metres (660 ft), but was ultimately rejected in 2015. The skyscraper stands to this day, and a nearby apartment building development was put up there instead.
