= History of the Jews in Poland =

Polish Jews
יְהוּדִי פוֺלִין Polscy Żydzi
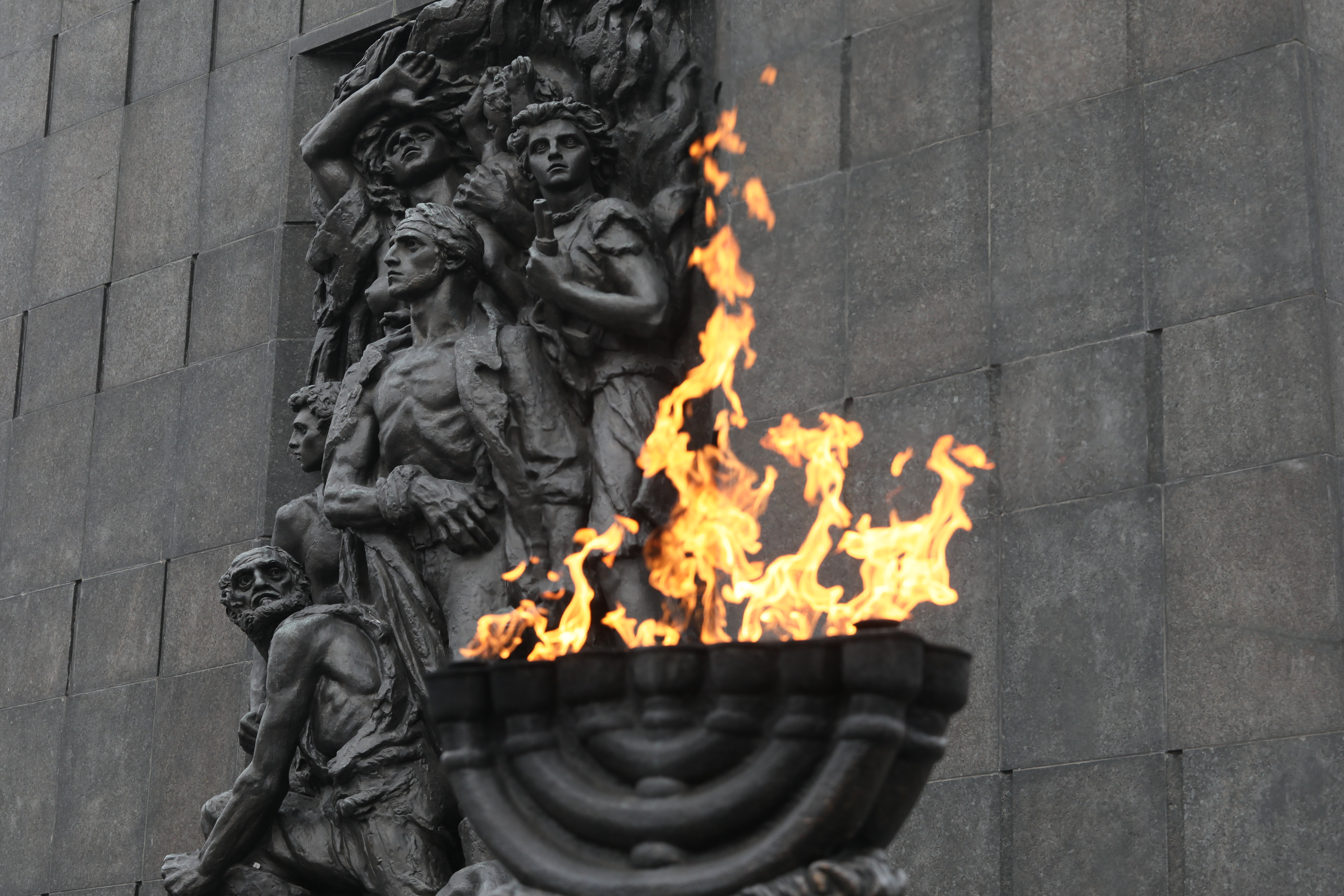
- Monument to the Ghetto Heroes beside the POLIN Museum of the History of Polish Jews in Warsaw

Total population
- est. 1,300,000+

Regions with significant populations
- Poland: > 17,156 (self-identifying, (Note: People are allowed to choose up to 2 ethnicities on the census form; however, only the first one gets computed for percentages.) 2021 census)
- Israel: 1,250,000 (ancestry, passport eligible (Note: This number essentially entails the amount of Israelis with at least one Polish great-grandparent, as of 2007.)); 202,300 (born in Poland or with a Polish-born father) (Note: As of 2010.)

Languages
- Polish, Hebrew, Yiddish, German

Religion
- Judaism

The history of the Jews in Poland dates back at least 1,000 years. For centuries, Poland was home to the largest and most significant Jewish community in the world. Poland was a principal center of Jewish culture, because of the long period of statutory religious tolerance and social autonomy which ended after the Partitions of Poland in the 18th century. During the Occupation of Poland (1939–1945) there was a nearly complete genocidal destruction of the Polish Jewish community, as the Holocaust was extended into German-occupied Poland, with many notorious concentration camps built on occupied soil. Since the fall of communism in Poland, there has been a renewed interest in Jewish culture, featuring an annual Jewish Culture Festival in Kraków, new study programs at Polish secondary schools and universities, and the opening of Warsaw's Museum of the History of Polish Jews.

From the founding of the Kingdom of Poland in 1025 until the early years of the Polish–Lithuanian Commonwealth created in 1569, Poland was considered the most tolerant country in Europe. Poland became a shelter for Jews persecuted and expelled from various European countries and the home to the world's largest Jewish community of the time. According to some sources, about three-quarters of the world's Jews lived in Poland by the middle of the 16th century. With the weakening of the Commonwealth and growing religious strife following the Protestant Reformation and Counter-Reformation, Poland's traditional tolerance began to wane from the 17th century. After each of the three Partitions of Poland in the late 18th century and the destruction of Poland as a sovereign state, Polish Jews became subject to the laws of the partitioning powers, including the increasingly antisemitic Russian Empire, as well as the German states of Austria-Hungary, the Kingdom of Prussia, and the later German Empire. When Poland regained independence in the aftermath of World War I, it was still the center of the European Jewish world, with one of the world's largest Jewish communities of over 3 million. Antisemitism was a growing problem throughout Europe in those years, from both the political establishment and the general population. Throughout the Second Polish Republic, Poland supported Jewish emigration from Poland and the creation of a Jewish state in Palestine. The Polish state also supported Jewish paramilitary groups such as the Haganah, Betar, and Irgun, providing them with weapons and training.

In September 1939, Poland was invaded by both Nazi Germany and the Soviet Union, who had previously divided the nation between them. One-fifth of the Polish population perished during World War II. The 3 million Polish Jews murdered in the Holocaust, who constituted 90% of Polish Jewry, made up half of all Poles killed during the war. While the Holocaust occurred largely in German-occupied Poland, it was orchestrated and perpetrated by the Nazis. Polish attitudes to the Holocaust varied widely. Some Poles actively risked death in order to save Jewish lives, and others engaged in passive refusal to inform on them. On the other hand, many Poles were also indifferent, and some engaged in blackmail, and in extreme cases, committing premeditated murders such as in the Jedwabne pogrom. Collaboration by non-Jewish Polish citizens in the Holocaust was sporadic, but incidents of hostility against Jews are well documented and have been a subject of renewed scholarly interest during the 21st century.

In the post-war period, many of the approximately 200,000 Jewish survivors left the Polish People's Republic for the nascent State of Israel or the Americas. Their departure was hastened by the destruction of Jewish institutions, post-war anti-Jewish violence, and the hostility of the Communist Party to both religion and private enterprise, but also because in 1946–1947 Poland was the only Eastern Bloc country to allow free Jewish aliyah to Israel, without visas or exit permits. Most of the remaining Jews left Poland in late 1968 as the result of the "anti-Zionist" campaign. After the fall of the Communist regime in 1989, the situation of Polish Jews became normalized and those who were Polish citizens before World War II were allowed to renew Polish citizenship.

At the time of the 2021 Polish census, there were 17,156 Jews living in Poland.

== Early history to Golden Age: 966–1572 ==
=== Early history: 966–1385 ===
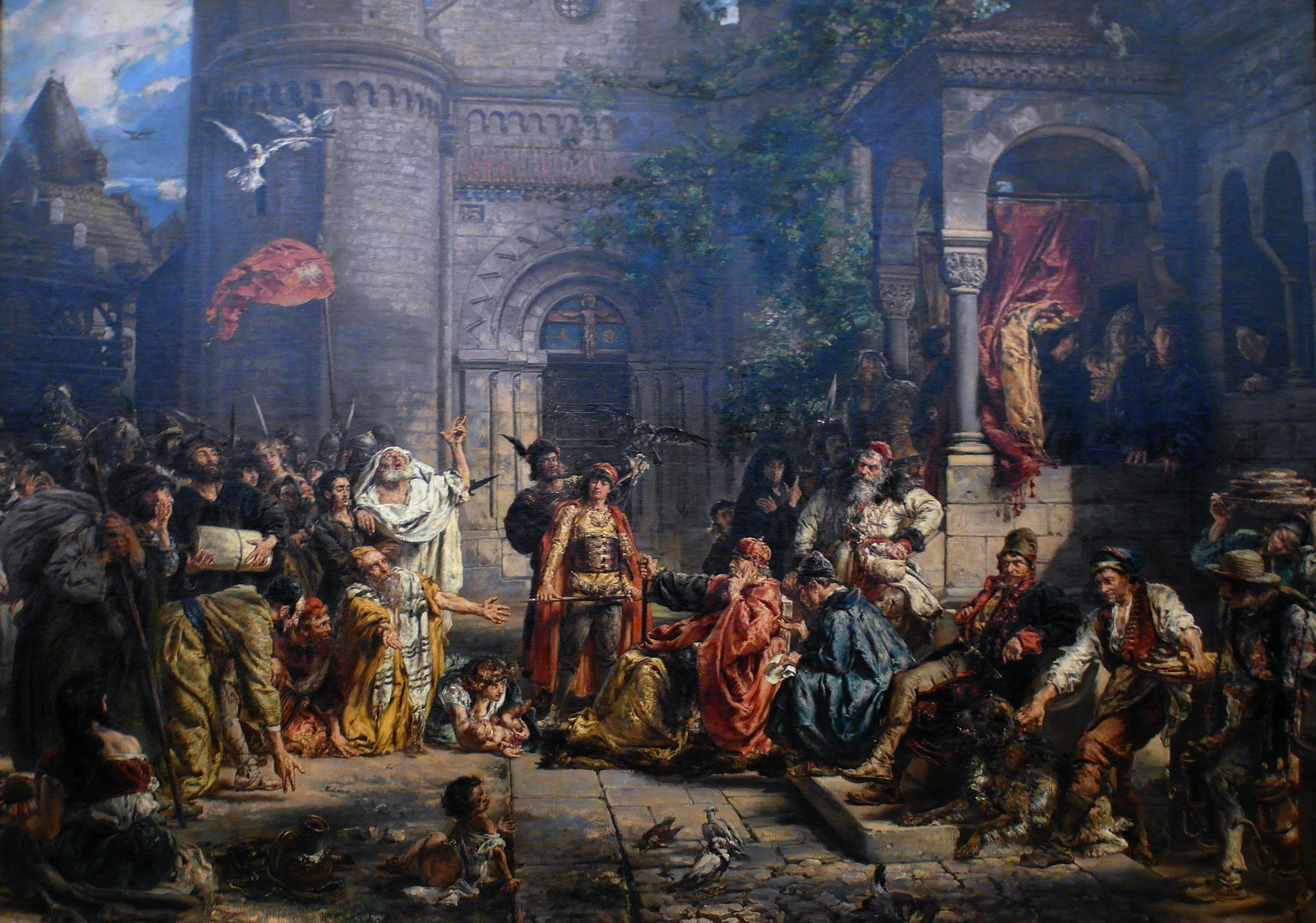
Reception of Jews in Poland, by Jan Matejko, 1889

The first Jews to visit Polish territory were traders, while permanent settlement began during the Crusades. Travelling along trade routes leading east to Kiev and Bukhara, Jewish merchants, known as Radhanites, crossed Silesia. One of them, Ibrahim ibn Yaqub (fl. 961–62), a diplomat and merchant from the town of Tortosa in al-Andalus sent by the Umayyad Caliph of Córdoba, Al-Hakam II, was the first chronicler to mention the Polish state ruled by Prince Mieszko I. In the summer of 965 or 966, Jacob made a trade and diplomatic journey from his native Toledo in Muslim Spain to the Holy Roman Empire and then to the Slavic countries. The first mention of Jews in Polish chronicles was of a Jewish community in 11th century Gniezno, then the capital of the Polish kingdom of the Piast dynasty. Among the first Jews to arrive in Poland in 1097 or 1098 were those banished from Prague. The first permanent Jewish community is mentioned in 1085 by a Jewish scholar Jehuda ha-Kohen in the city of Przemyśl.

As elsewhere in Central and Eastern Europe, the principal activity of Jews in medieval Poland was commerce and trade, including the export and import of goods such as cloth, linen, furs, hides, wax, metal objects, and slaves.

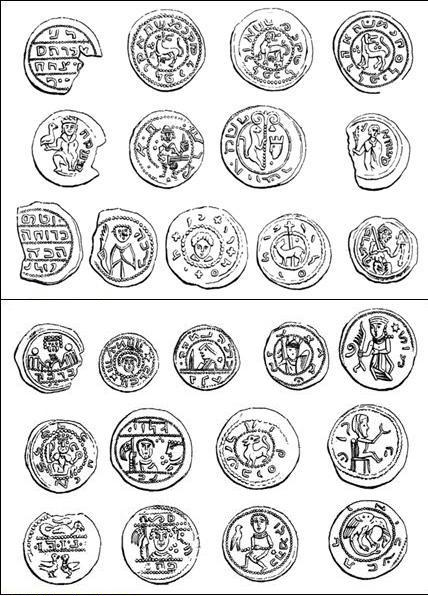
Early-medieval Polish coins with Hebrew inscriptions

The first extensive Jewish migration from Western Europe to Poland occurred at the time of the First Crusade in 1098. Under Bolesław III (1102–1139), Jews settled throughout Poland, including over the border in Lithuanian territory as far as Kiev. Bolesław III recognized the utility of Jews in the development of the commercial interests of his country. Jews came to form the backbone of the Polish economy. Mieszko III employed Jews in his mint as engravers and technical supervisors, and the coins minted during that period even bear Hebraic markings. Jews worked on commission for the mints of other contemporary Polish princes, including Casimir the Just, Bolesław I the Tall and Władysław III Spindleshanks. Jews enjoyed undisturbed peace and prosperity in the many principalities into which the country was then divided; they formed the middle class in a country where the general population consisted of landlords (developing into szlachta, the unique Polish nobility) and peasants, and they were instrumental in promoting the commercial interests of the land.

Another factor for the Jews to emigrate to Poland was the Magdeburg rights (or Magdeburg Law), a charter given to Jews, among others, that specifically outlined the rights and privileges that Jews had in Poland. For example, they could maintain communal autonomy, and live according to their own laws. This made it very attractive for Jewish communities to pick up and move to Poland.

The first mention of Jewish settlers in Płock dates from 1237, in Kalisz from 1287 and a Żydowska (Jewish) street in Kraków in 1304.

The tolerant situation was gradually altered by the Roman Catholic Church on the one hand, and by the neighboring German states on the other. Some of the reigning princes were determined protectors of the Jewish inhabitants, who they saw as a key to economic development. Prominent among such rulers was Bolesław the Pious of Kalisz, Prince of Great Poland. With the consent of the class representatives and higher officials, in 1264 he issued a General Charter of Jewish Liberties (commonly called the Statute of Kalisz), which granted all Jews the freedom to worship, trade, and travel. Similar privileges were granted to the Silesian Jews by the local princes, Henryk IV Probus of Wrocław in 1273–90, Henryk III of Głogów in 1274 and 1299, Henryk V the Fat of Legnica in 1290–95, and Bolko III the Generous of Legnica and Wrocław in 1295. Article 31 of the Statute of Kalisz tried to rein in the Catholic Church from disseminating blood libels against the Jews.

During the next hundred years, the Church pushed for the persecution of Jews while the rulers of Poland usually protected them. The Councils of Wrocław (1267), Buda (1279), and Łęczyca (1285) each segregated Jews, ordered them to wear a special emblem, banned them from holding offices where Christians would be subordinated to them, and forbade them from building more than one prayer house in each town. However, those church decrees required the cooperation of the Polish princes for enforcement, which was generally not forthcoming, due to the profits which the Jews' economic activity yielded to the princes.

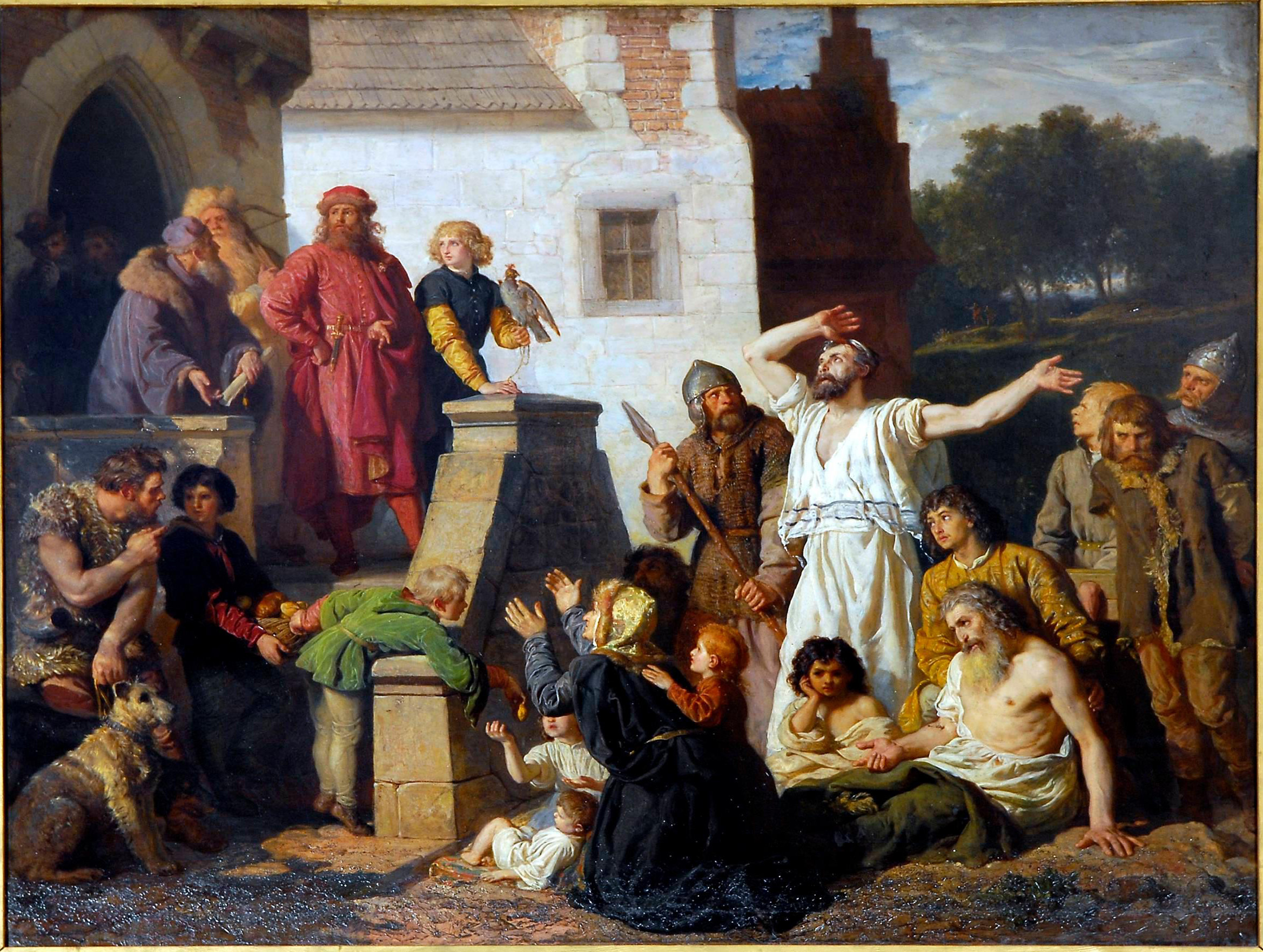
Casimir the Great and the Jews, by Wojciech Gerson, 1874

In 1332, King Casimir III the Great (1303–1370) amplified and expanded Bolesław's old charter with the Wiślicki Statute. Under his reign, streams of Jewish immigrants headed east to Poland and Jewish settlements are first mentioned as existing in Lvov (1356), Sandomierz (1367), and Kazimierz near Kraków (1386). Casimir, who according to a legend had a Jewish lover named Esterka from Opoczno was especially friendly to the Jews, and his reign is regarded as an era of great prosperity for Polish Jewry, and was nicknamed by his contemporaries "King of the serfs and Jews". Under penalty of death, he prohibited the kidnapping of Jewish children for the purpose of enforced Christian baptism. He inflicted heavy punishment for the desecration of Jewish cemeteries. Nevertheless, while the Jews of Poland enjoyed tranquility for the greater part of Casimir's reign, toward its close they were subjected to persecution on account of the Black Death. In 1348, the first blood libel accusation against Jews in Poland was recorded, and in 1367 the first pogrom took place in Poznań. Compared with the pitiless destruction of their co-religionists in Western Europe, however, Polish Jews did not fare badly; and Jewish refugees from Germany fled to the more hospitable cities in Poland.

=== The early Jagiellon era: 1385–1506 ===
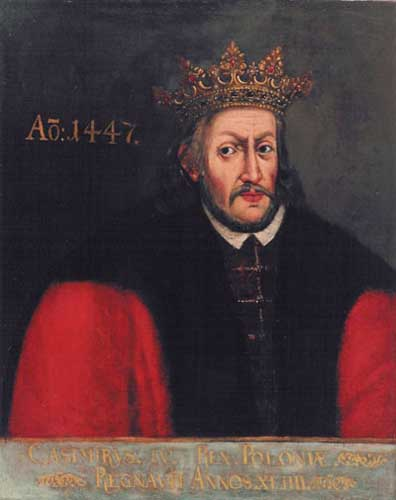
Casimir IV Jagiellon confirmed and extended Jewish charters in the second half of the 15th century

As a result of the marriage of Władysław II Jagiełło to Jadwiga, daughter of Louis I of Hungary, Lithuania was united with the kingdom of Poland. In 1388–1389, broad privileges were extended to Lithuanian Jews including freedom of religion and commerce on equal terms with the Christians. Under the rule of Władysław II, Polish Jews had increased in numbers and attained prosperity. However, religious persecution gradually increased, as the dogmatic clergy pushed for less official tolerance, pressured by the Council of Constance. In 1349 pogroms took place in many towns in Silesia. There were accusations of blood libel by the priests, and new riots against the Jews in Poznań in 1399. Accusations of blood libel by another fanatic priest led to the riots in Kraków in 1407, although the royal guard hastened to the rescue. Hysteria caused by the Black Death led to outbreaks of violence against the Jews in Kalisz, Kraków and Bochnia. Traders and artisans jealous of Jewish prosperity and fearing their rivalry supported the harassment. In 1423, the Statute of Warka forbade Jews the granting of loans against letters of credit or mortgage and limited their operations exclusively to loans made on security of moveable property.

In the 14th and 15th centuries, rich Jewish merchants and moneylenders leased the royal mint, salt mines and the collecting of customs and tolls. The most famous of them were Jordan and his son Lewko of Kraków in the 14th century and Jakub Slomkowicz of Lutsk, Wolczko of Drohobych, Natko of Lviv, Samson of Zhydachiv, Josko of Hrubieszów and Szania of Belz in the 15th century. For example, Wolczko of Drohobycz, King Ladislaus Jagiełło's broker, was the owner of several villages in the Ruthenian voivodship and the soltys (administrator) of the village of Werbiz. Also, Jews from Grodno were in this period owners of villages, manors, meadows, fish ponds and mills. However, until the end of the 15th century, agriculture as a source of income played only a minor role among Jewish families. More important were crafts for the needs of both their fellow Jews and the Christian population (fur making, tanning, tailoring).

In 1454 anti-Jewish riots flared up in Bohemia's ethnically-German Wrocław and other Silesian cities, inspired by a Franciscan friar, John of Capistrano, who accused Jews of profaning the Christian religion. As a result, Jews were banished from Lower Silesia. Zbigniew Olesnicki then invited John to conduct a similar campaign in Kraków and several other cities, to lesser effect.

The decline in the status of the Jews was briefly checked by Casimir IV Jagiellon (1447–1492), but soon the Polish nobility forced him to issue the Statutes of Nieszawa, which, among other things, abolished the ancient privileges of the Jews "as contrary to divine right and the law of the land." Nevertheless, the king continued to offer his protection to the Jews. Two years later Casimir issued another document announcing that he could not deprive the Jews of his benevolence on the basis of "the principle of tolerance which in conformity with God's laws obliged him to protect them". The policy of the government toward the Jews of Poland oscillated under Casimir's sons and successors, John I Albert (1492–1501) and Alexander Jagiellon (1501–1506). In 1495, Jews were ordered out of the center of Kraków and allowed to settle in the "Jewish town" of Kazimierz. In the same year, Alexander, when he was the Grand Duke of Lithuania, followed the 1492 example of Spanish rulers and banished Jews from Lithuania. For several years they took shelter in Poland until 1503 when—after becoming King of Poland—he allowed them to return to Lithuania. The next year he issued a proclamation in which he stated that a policy of tolerance befitted "kings and rulers".

Poland became more tolerant just as the Jews were expelled from Spain, from Austria, from Hungary and from Germany, thus stimulating Jewish immigration to Poland, which became a haven for exiles from Western Europe and a cultural and spiritual center of the Jewish people. In 1503, King Alexander Jagiellon appointed Jacob Pollak the first Chief Rabbi of Poland. Pollak founded a yeshiva (a school for the study of rabbinic literature) in Kraków.

=== Center of the Jewish world: 1506–1569 ===
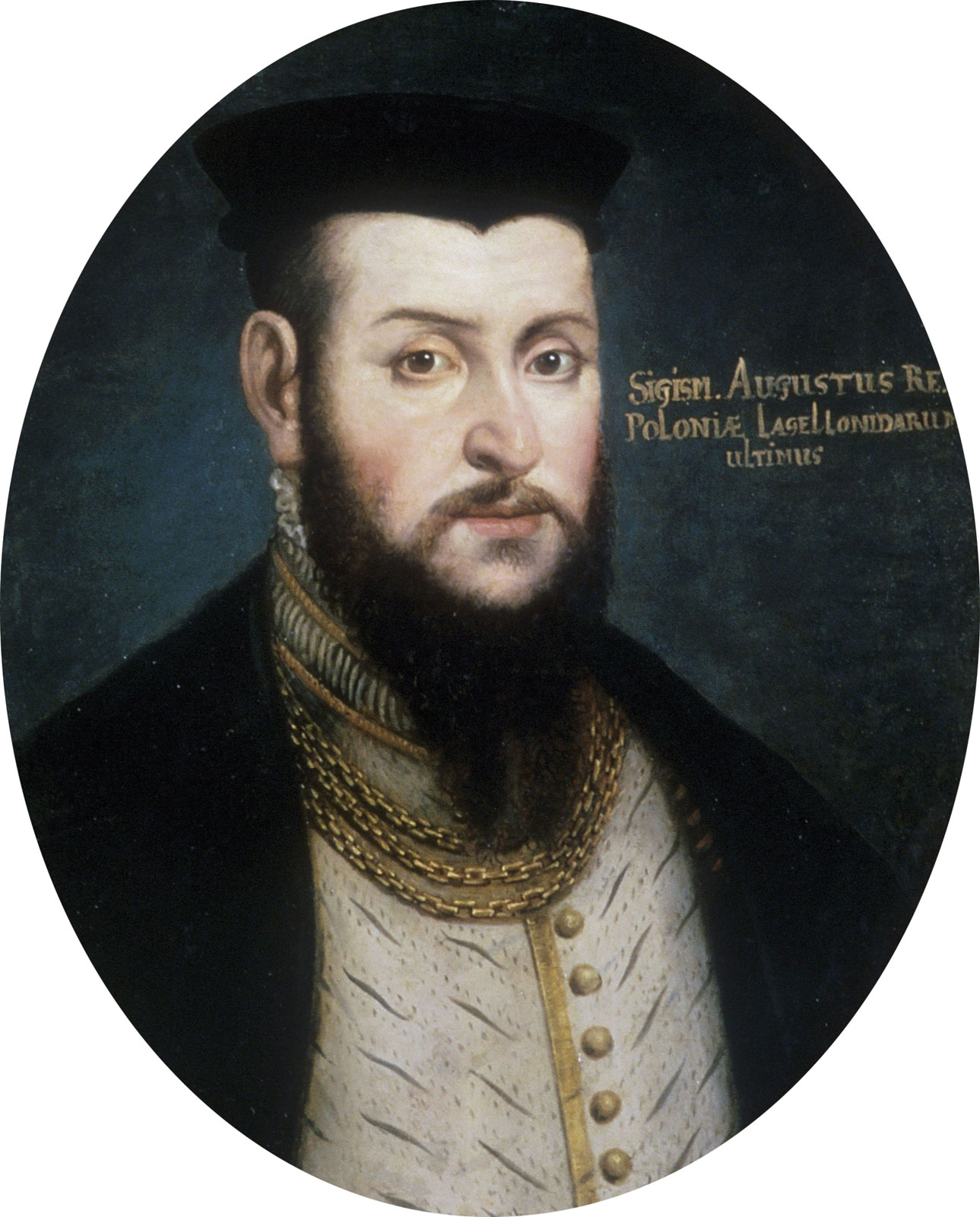
Sigismund II Augustus followed his father's tolerant policy and also granted autonomy to the Jews

The most prosperous period for Polish Jews began following a new influx of Jews after the accession of Sigismund I in 1506. Sigismund protected the Jews in his realm, which encouraged many Jews to emigate to Poland, where they founded a community at Kraków.

Shalom Shachna (one of Jacob Pollak’s pupils) is counted among the pioneers of Talmudic scholarship in Poland. In 1515 Shachna established the yeshiva in Lublin, which had the third largest Jewish community in Poland during that period. Shachna’s yeshiva produced several prominent rabbis, including Moses Isserles and Solomon Luria, who succeeded Shachna as rosh yeshiva of Lublin.

The first books to be published in the Hebrew and Yiddish languages in Poland were produced by the Halicz brothers, who established the first Jewish printing press in the Polish–Lithuanian Commonwealth in Kraków in 1534. That year, they published Sha'are Dura, written in Hebrew by Isaac ben Meir Halevi. The same year, they also published Mirkevet ha-Mishne, the first book in the world to be printed in Yiddish. During this period, Jewish mysticism and Kabbalah became popular and eminent Polish-Jewish scholars such as Mordecai Yoffe and Joel Sirkis devoted themselves to its study.

From the 14th century until 1538, Jews functioned widely as the arendators (lease-holders) of royal prerogatives in Poland such as the mint, salt mines, customs, and tax farming. Pressured by the nobility, in 1538 the Sejm prohibited the Jews from participating in this highly lucrative activity. Although these "great arenda" became one of the protected privileges of the Polish nobility, Jews continued to function as the arendators of landed estates leased from the nobility.

Sigismund II Augustus followed his father's tolerant policy, granting limited autonomy to the Jews and laying the foundation for the qahal, or autonomous Jewish community. Poland-Lithuania became the main center for Ashkenazi Jewry and its yeshivot achieved fame during this period. Poland welcomed Jewish immigrants from Italy, as well as Sephardic Jews, Romaniote Jews, Mizrahi Jews, and Persian Jews. Jewish religious life thrived in many Polish communities. By the middle of the 16th century, about 75% of all Jews lived in Poland.

By 1551, Polish Jews had been given permission to choose their own Chief Rabbi. Within the Jewish community, the Chief Rabbinate held power over law and finance, appointing judges and other officials. The Polish government permitted the Chief Rabbinate to grow in power, using the office for collection of taxes from the Jewish community. 30% of the money raised by the Rabbinate served Jewish causes, while the remainder went to the Crown for protection.

== The Polish–Lithuanian Commonwealth: 1569–1795 ==
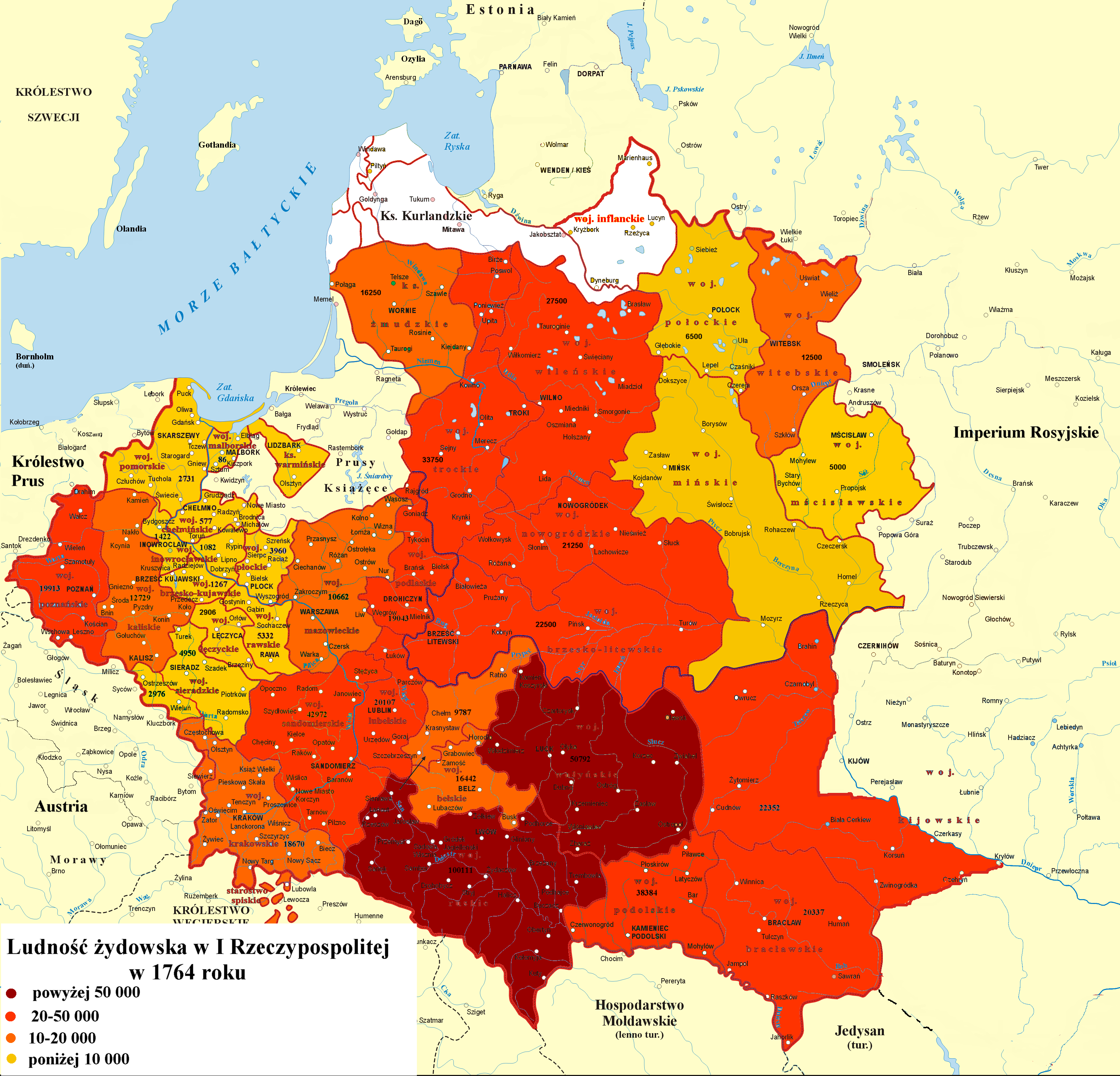
Number of Jews in Polish–Lithuanian Commonwealth per voivodeship in 1764

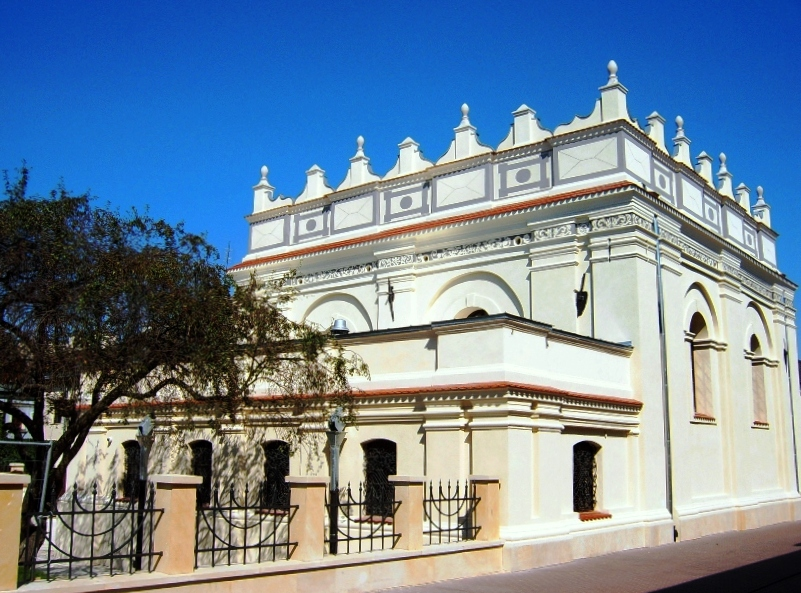
Completed in 1618, the Zamość Synagogue in the Old City of Zamość is an example of Polish late Renaissance architecture

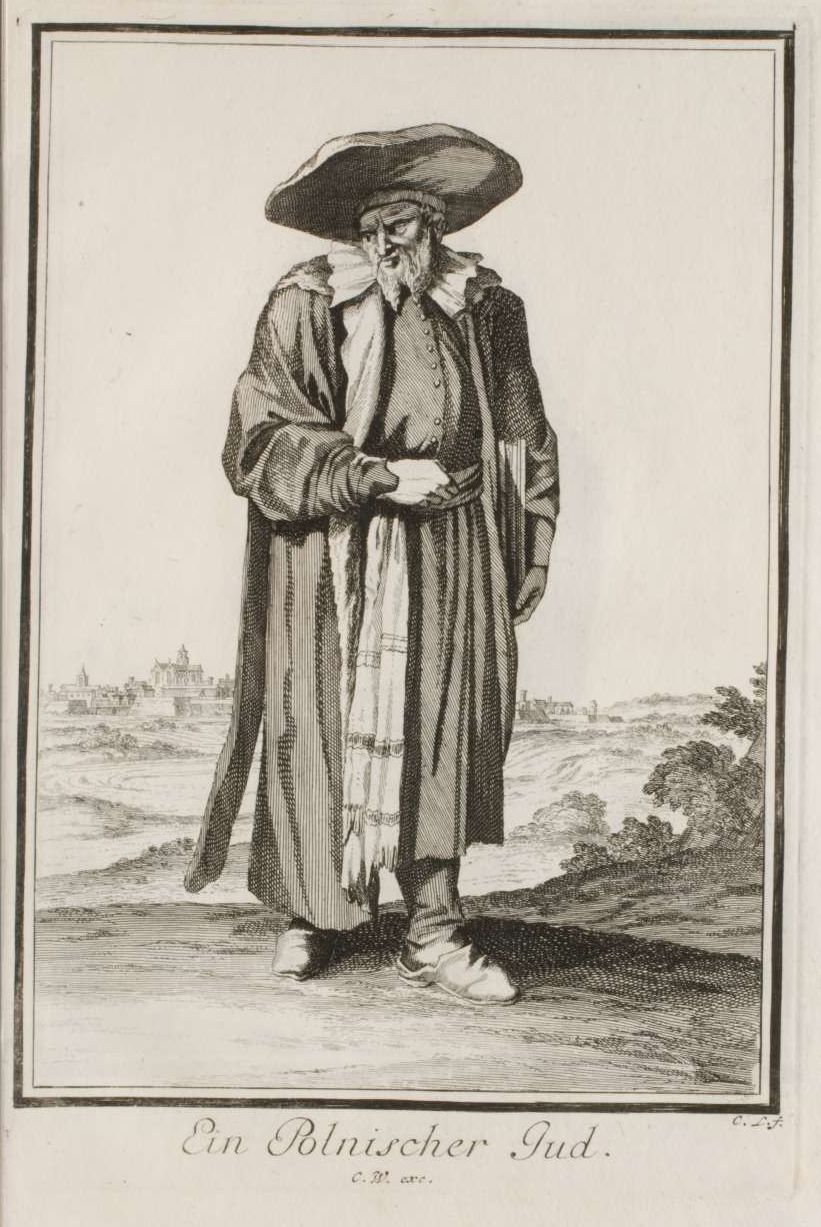
A Polish Jew in an engraving from 1703

After the death of Sigismund II Augustus in 1572, the Polish nobility gathered in Warsaw and signed the Warsaw Confederation, a document in which representatives of all major religions pledged mutual support and tolerance. The central autonomous body that—along with the Chief Rabbinate—regulated Jewish life in Poland from about 1580 until 1764 was known as the Council of Four Lands.

According to Gershon Hundert, the following eight or nine decades of relative prosperity and security experienced by Polish Jews witnessed the appearance of "a virtual galaxy of sparkling intellectual figures." Yeshivot were established in prominent Jewish communities such as Brześć, Lublin, Lwów, Ostróg, and Poznań. By 1600, the Jewish printing house in Kraków had printed some 200 works, mostly in Hebrew, but sometimes also in Yiddish. Educational development was mostly along Talmudic lines, though some Jewish youth sought secular instruction in the European universities. The rabbis became not merely expounders of Jewish law, but also spiritual advisers, teachers, judges, and legislators. Polish Jewry found its views of life shaped by these principles, whose influence was felt in the home, in school, and in the synagogue.

The culture and intellectual output of the Jewish community in Poland had a profound impact on Judaism as a whole. Some Jewish historians have recounted that the word Poland is pronounced as Polania or Polin in Hebrew, and as transliterated into Hebrew, these names for Poland were interpreted as good omens because Polania can be broken down into three Hebrew words: po ("here"), lan ("dwells"), ya ("God"), and Polin into two words of: po ("here") lin ("[you should] dwell"). The message was that Poland was meant to be a good place for the Jews. According to Rabbi David HaLevi Segal, Poland was a place where "most of the time the gentiles do no harm; on the contrary they do right by Israel" (Divre David; 1689).

It was during this period that a xenophobic pasquinade claiming that Poland was a "paradise for the Jews" was written. Despite the Warsaw Confederation, there was a significant increase in antisemitism at this time, partly due to the Counter-Reformation and the growing influence of the Jesuits. By the 1590s, there were anti-Jewish outbreaks in Poznań, Lublin, Kraków, Vilnius and Kiev. In Lwów alone there were attacks against Jews in 1572, 1592, 1613, 1618, and every year from 1638, with Jesuit students being responsible for many of them. At the same time, laws were introduced to restrict Jews from living in the royal towns and cities in the Commonwealth, which increased their migration to the eastern parts of the country where they were invited by the magnates to their private towns. By the end of the 18th century, two-thirds of the royal towns and cities in the Commonwealth had pressed the king to grant them that privilege.

After the Union of Brest in 1595–1596, the Orthodox church was outlawed in the Polish-Lithuanian Commonwealth. This, along with the mass migration of Jews to Ruthenia and their negative perception by the local population, resulted in significant religious, social and political tensions in Ruthenia. These tensions intensified the many uprisings by the Cossacks, which had begun in 1591. The largest of these was the Khmelnytsky Uprising (1648 – 1657), in which Cossacks massacred tens of thousands of Jews, Catholics and Uniates in the eastern and southern areas of the Polish Crown. Although the uprising was directed primarily against the wealthy nobility and landlords, the Cossacks perceived the Jews as their local representatives. The precise number of dead is not known, but the decrease of the Jewish population during this period is estimated at 100,000 to 200,000, which also includes emigration, deaths from diseases and jasyr (captivity in the Ottoman Empire).

The combined effects of the Cossack uprisings, along with internal conflicts in Poland and concurrent invasions of the Commonwealth by the Tsardom of Russia, the Swedish Empire, the Crimean Tatars, and the Ottoman Empire, ended the Polish Golden Age and caused a decline of Polish power during the period known as "the Deluge". The destruction, pillage and plunder during the Siege of Kraków (1657) was so methodical that parts of the city never recovered. The Polish general Stefan Czarniecki was responsible for massacres of the Ruthenian and Jewish population during this time. Many Jews along with the townsfolk of Kalisz, Kraków, Poznań, Piotrków and Lublin also fell victim to recurring epidemics.

After these disturbances ended, Jews returned and rebuilt their destroyed homes. Although the Jewish population of Poland had decreased, it still was more numerous than that of the Jewish colonies in Western Europe, and Poland continued to be a spiritual center of Judaism. Through 1698, the Polish kings generally remained supportive of the Jews.

=== The rise of Jewish sectarianism ===
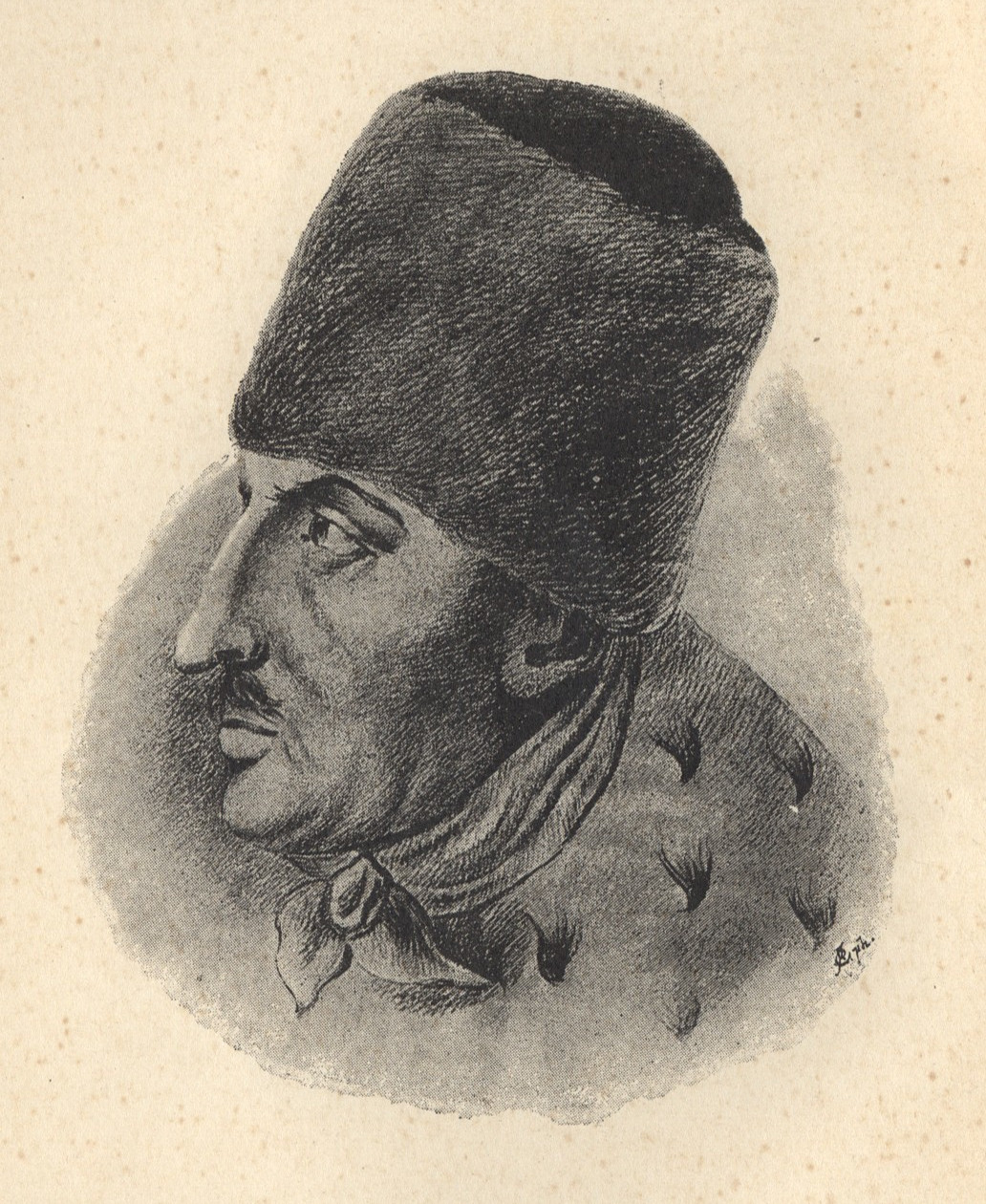
Jacob Frank, 1895 depiction

The decade from the Khmelnytsky Uprising until after the Deluge (1648–1658) left a deep and lasting impression not only on the social life of the Polish–Lithuanian Jews, but on their spiritual life as well. Intellectual output was reduced and study of the Talmud became overly formalized and accessible to fewer students. Some rabbis busied themselves with quibbles concerning religious laws, while others wrote hair-splitting Talmudic commentaries. Certain Ashkenazic movements began to appear at this time. At the same time, many miracle-workers made their appearance among the Jews of Poland, culminating in a series of Messianic movements, such as Sabbatianism and Frankism.

In this time of Jewish mysticism and overly formal Rabbinism came the teachings of Israel ben Eliezer, known as the Baal Shem Tov, or BeShT, (1698–1760), which had a profound effect on the Jews of Eastern Europe and Poland in particular. His disciples taught and encouraged the new fervent brand of Judaism based on Kabbalah known as Hasidic Judaism. The rise of Hasidic Judaism within Poland's borders and beyond had a great influence on the rise of Haredi Judaism all over the world, with a continuous influence through its many Hasidic dynasties including those of Chabad, Aleksander, Bobov, Ger, and Nadvorna.

=== The Partitions of Poland ===
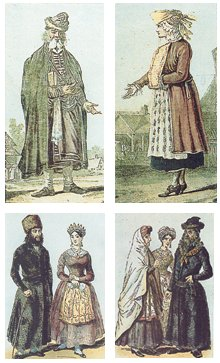
Jewish dress in 17th (top) and 18th centuries

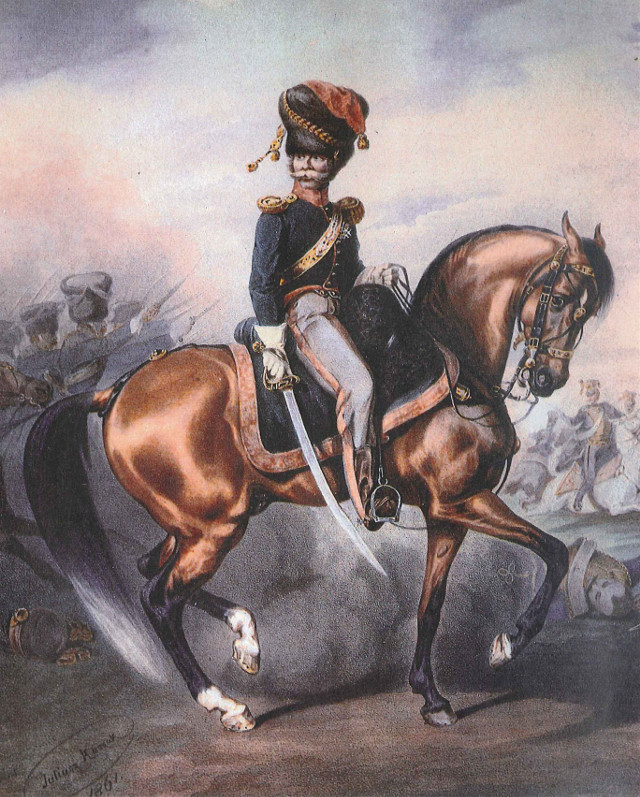
Berek Joselewicz (1764–1809)

In 1742 most of Silesia was annexed by Prussia as a result of the Silesian Wars. Further disorder and anarchy ensued in Poland in 1764, after the accession to the throne of its last king, Stanislaus II Augustus Poniatowski. Eight years later, triggered by the Confederation of Bar against Russian influence and the pro-Russian king, the outlying provinces of Poland were overrun from all sides by different military forces and divided for the first time by the three neighboring empires, Russia, Austria, and Prussia. The Commonwealth lost 30% of its land during the annexations of 1772, and even more of its peoples. Jews were most numerous in the territories that fell under the military control of Austria and Russia.

By 1764, there were about 750,000 Jews in the Polish–Lithuanian Commonwealth. The worldwide Jewish population at that time was estimated at 1.2 million.

In 1768, the Koliivshchyna, a rebellion in Right-bank Ukraine west of the Dnieper in Volhynia, led to ferocious murders of Polish noblemen, Catholic priests and thousands of Jews by haydamaks. Four years later, in 1772, the military Partitions of Poland had begun between Russia, Prussia, and Austria.

The permanent council established at the insistence of the Russian government (1773–1788) served as the highest administrative tribunal, and occupied itself with the elaboration of a plan that would make practicable the reorganization of Poland on a more rational basis. The progressive elements in Polish society recognized the urgency of popular education as the first step toward reform. The Commission of National Education—the first ministry of education in the world—was established in 1773, and founded numerous new schools while remodelling older ones. Chancellor Andrzej Zamoyski and other members of the commission demanded that religious toleration and the inviolability of their persons and property should be guaranteed to Jews. However, they also insisted that Jews living in the cities should be separated from Christians, that Jews having no clear occupation should be banished from the kingdom, and that Jews should not be allowed to possess land. On the other hand, some szlachta and intellectuals proposed a national system of government characterized by civil and political equality of the Jews. This was the only example in modern Europe before the French Revolution of tolerance and broadmindedness in dealing with the Jewish question. But all these reforms were too late: a Russian army soon invaded Poland, followed by a Prussian one.

A second partition of Poland was made on 17 July 1793. Jews, in a Jewish regiment led by Berek Joselewicz, took part in the Kościuszko Uprising the following year, when the Poles tried to again achieve independence, but were brutally put down. Following the revolt, the third and final partition of Poland took place in 1795 transferring the territories concentrating most of the Jewish population to Russia.

Under foreign rule many Jews inhabiting formerly Polish lands were indifferent to Polish aspirations for independence. However, most Polonized Jews supported the revolutionary activities of Polish patriots and participated in national uprisings. Polish Jews took part in the November Insurrection of 1830–1831, the January Insurrection of 1863, as well as in the revolutionary movement of 1905. Many Polish Jews were enlisted in the Polish Legions, which fought for the Polish independence, achieved in 1918 when the occupying forces disintegrated following World War I.

== Jews of Poland within the Russian Empire (1795–1918) ==
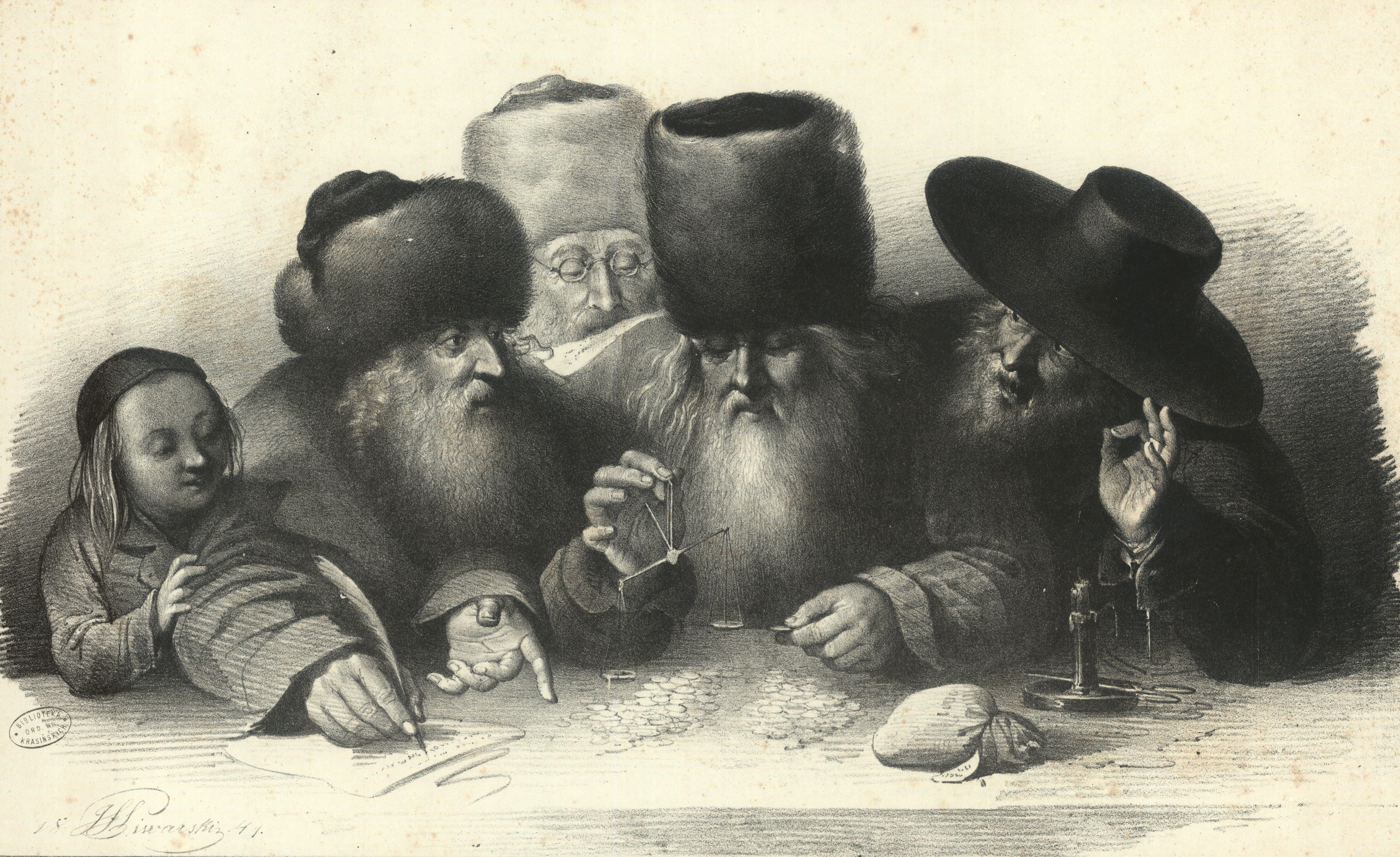
Jewish merchants in 19th-century Warsaw

Official Russian policy would eventually prove to be substantially harsher to the Jews than that under independent Polish rule. In 1772, Catherine II instituted the Pale of Settlement, restricting Jews to the western parts of the empire, which eventually included much of Poland, although it excluded some areas in which Jews had previously lived. By the late 19th century, over four million Jews lived in the Pale.

Tsarist policy towards the Jews of Poland alternated between harsh rules, and inducements meant to break the resistance to large-scale conversion. In 1804, Alexander I of Russia issued a "Statute Concerning Jews", meant to accelerate the process of assimilation of the Empire's new Jewish population. The Polish Jews were allowed to establish schools with Russian, German or Polish curricula. However, they were also restricted from leasing property, teaching in Yiddish, and from entering Russia. They were banned from the brewing industry. The harshest measures designed to compel Jews to merge into society at large called for their expulsion from small villages, forcing them to move into towns. Once the resettlement began, thousands of Jews lost their only source of income and turned to Qahal for support. Their living conditions in the Pale began to dramatically worsen.

During the reign of Tsar Nicolas I, known by the Jews as "Haman the Second", hundreds of new anti-Jewish measures were enacted. The 1827 decree by Nicolas – while lifting the traditional double taxation on Jews in lieu of army service – made Jews subject to general military recruitment laws that required Jewish communities to provide seven recruits for every 1000 "souls" every four years. Unlike the general population, which had to provide recruits between the ages of 18 and 35, Jews had to provide recruits between the ages of 12 and 25, at the qahal's discretion. As a result, until they turned 18, over 30,000 children were placed in preparatory Cantonist schools between 1827 and 1857, where they were pressured to convert to Christianity. These years were not counted towards their twenty-five years of required military service. To escape this fate, children were sent to Congress Poland where Jewish conscription was not instituted until 1844.

=== Pale of Settlement ===
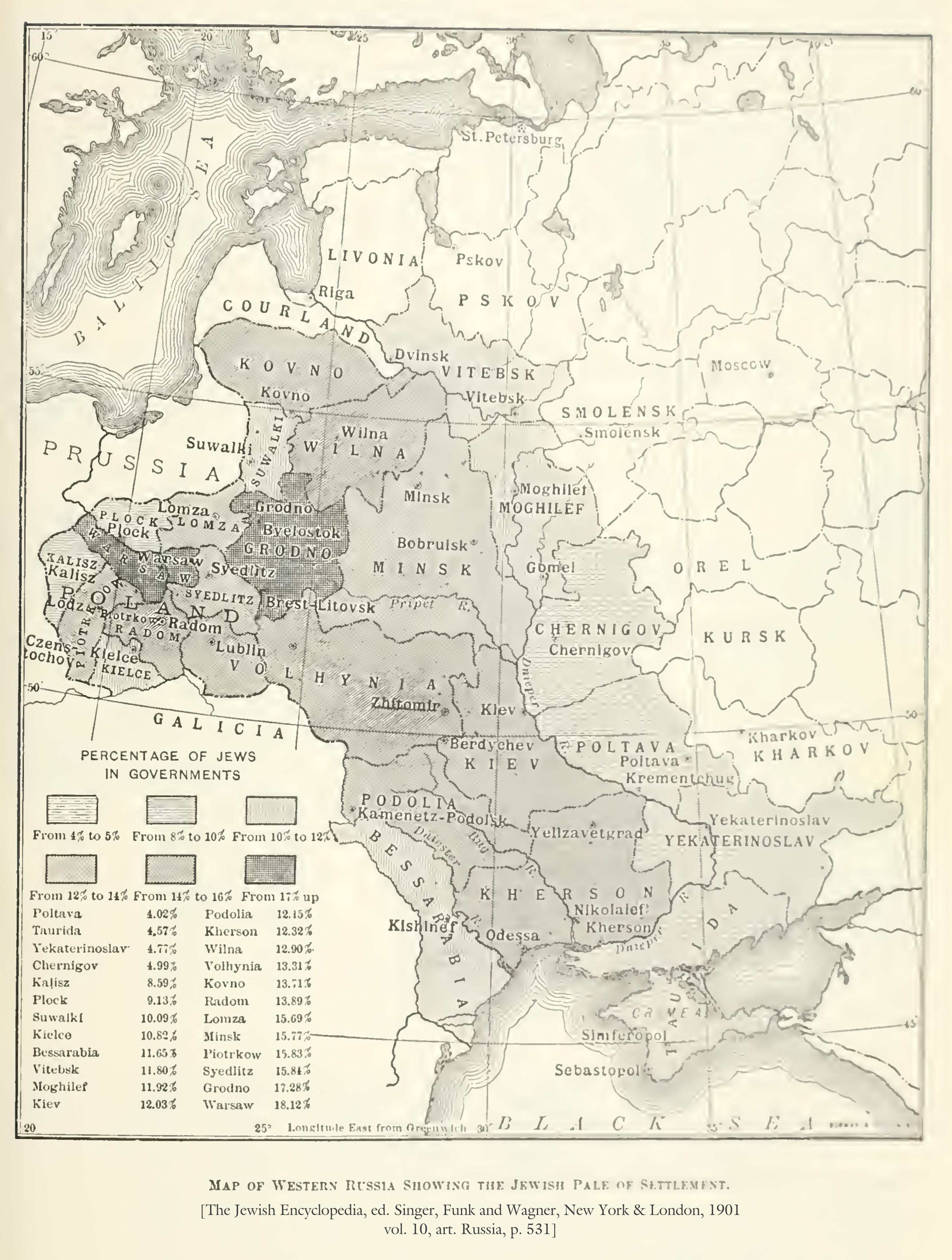
Map of Pale of Settlement, showing Jewish population densities

The Pale of Settlement (Russian: Черта́ осе́длости, chertá osédlosti, Yiddish: תּחום-המושבֿ, tkhum-ha-moyshəv, Hebrew: תְּחוּם הַמּוֹשָב, tḥùm ha-mosháv) was the term given to a region of Imperial Russia in which permanent residency by Jews was allowed and beyond which Jewish permanent residency was generally prohibited. It extended from the eastern pale, or demarcation line, to the western Russian border with the Kingdom of Prussia (later the German Empire) and with Austria-Hungary. The archaic English term pale is derived from the Latin word palus, a stake, extended to mean the area enclosed by a fence or boundary.

With its large Catholic and Jewish populations, the Pale was acquired by the Russian Empire (which was a majority Russian Orthodox) in a series of military conquests and diplomatic maneuvers between 1791 and 1835, and lasted until the fall of the Russian Empire in 1917. It comprised about 20% of the territory of European Russia and mostly corresponded to historical borders of the former Polish–Lithuanian Commonwealth; it covered much of present-day Lithuania, Belarus, Poland, Moldova, Ukraine, and parts of western Russia.

From 1791 to 1835, and until 1917, there were differing reconfigurations of the boundaries of the Pale, such that certain areas were variously open or shut to Jewish residency, such as the Caucasus. At times, Jews were forbidden to live in agricultural communities, or certain cities, as in Kiev, Sevastopol and Yalta, excluded from residency at a number of cities within the Pale. Settlers from outside the pale were forced to move to small towns, thus fostering the rise of the shtetls.

Although the Jews were accorded slightly more rights with the Emancipation reform of 1861 by Alexander II, they were still restricted to the Pale of Settlement and subject to restrictions on ownership and profession. The existing status quo was shattered with the assassination of Alexander in 1881 – an act falsely blamed upon the Jews.

=== Pogroms in the Russian Empire ===
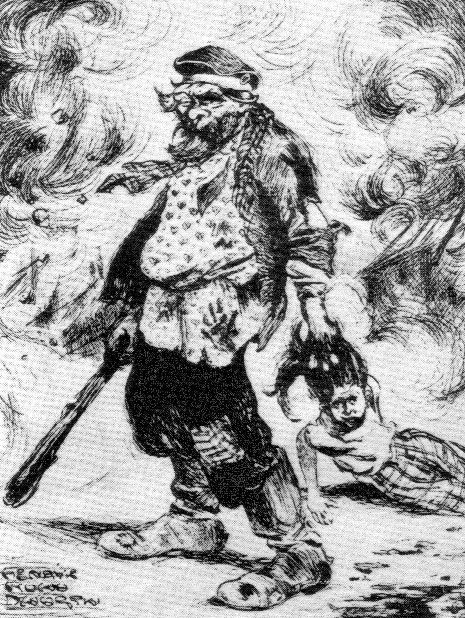
Caricature of Russian Army assailant in 1906 Białystok pogrom

The assassination prompted a large-scale wave of anti-Jewish riots, called pogroms (Russian: погро́м;) throughout 1881–1884. In the 1881 outbreak, pogroms were primarily limited to Russia, although in a riot in Warsaw two Jews were killed, 24 others were wounded, women were raped and over two million rubles worth of property was destroyed. The new czar, Alexander III, blamed the Jews for the riots and issued a series of harsh restrictions on Jewish movements. Pogroms continued until 1884, with at least tacit government approval. They proved to be a turning point in the history of the Jews in partitioned Poland and throughout the world. In 1884, 36 Jewish Zionist delegates met in Katowice, forming the Hovevei Zion movement. The pogroms also prompted a wave of Jewish emigration to the United States.

An even bloodier wave of pogroms broke out from 1903 to 1906, at least some of them believed to have been organized by the Tsarist Russian secret police, the Okhrana. They included the Białystok pogrom of 1906 in the Grodno Governorate of Russian Poland, in which at least 75 Jews were murdered by marauding soldiers and many more Jews were wounded. According to Jewish survivors, ethnic Poles did not participate in the pogrom and instead sheltered Jewish families.

=== Haskalah and Halakha ===
The Jewish Enlightenment, Haskalah, began to take hold in Poland during the 19th century, stressing secular ideas and values. Champions of Haskalah, the Maskilim, pushed for assimilation and integration into Russian culture. At the same time, there was another school of Jewish thought that emphasized traditional study and a Jewish response to the ethical problems of antisemitism and persecution, one form of which was the Musar movement. Polish Jews generally were less influenced by Haskalah, rather focusing on a strong continuation of their religious lives based on Halakha ("rabbis's law") following primarily Orthodox Judaism, Hasidic Judaism, and also adapting to the new Religious Zionism of the Mizrachi movement later in the 19th century.

=== Politics in Polish territory ===
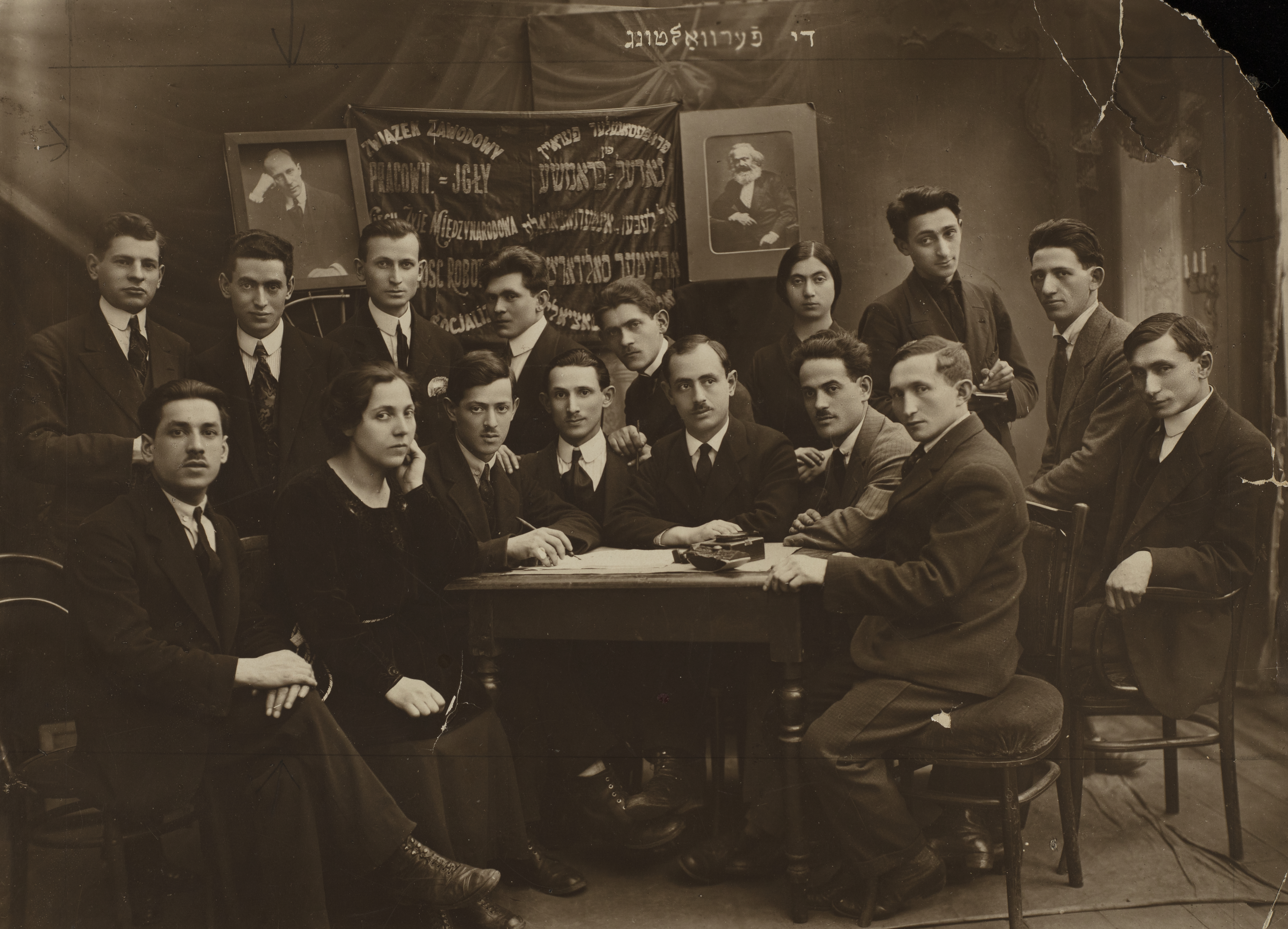
Executive Committee of the Warsaw Garment Workers' Union, 1917. Displayed in the back are portraits of Vladimir Medem and Karl Marx.

By the late 19th century, Haskalah and the debates it caused created a growing number of political movements within the Jewish community itself, covering a wide range of views and vying for votes in local and regional elections. Zionism became very popular with the advent of the Poale Zion socialist party as well as the religious Polish Mizrahi, and the increasingly popular General Zionists. Jews also took up socialism, forming the Bund labor union which supported assimilation and the rights of labor. The Folkspartei (People's Party) advocated, for its part, cultural autonomy and resistance to assimilation. In 1912, Agudat Israel, a religious party, came into existence.

Many Jews took part in the Polish insurrections, particularly against Russia (since the Tsars discriminated heavily against the Jews). The Kościuszko Insurrection (1794), November Insurrection (1830–31), January Insurrection (1863) and Revolutionary Movement of 1905 all saw significant Jewish involvement in the cause of Polish independence.

During the Second Polish Republic period, there were several prominent Jewish politicians in the Polish Sejm, such as Apolinary Hartglas and Yitzhak Gruenbaum. Many Jewish political parties were active, representing a wide ideological spectrum, from the Zionists, to the socialists to the anti-Zionists. One of the largest of these parties was the Bund, which was strongest in Warsaw and Łódź.

In addition to the socialists, Zionist parties were also popular, in particular, the Marxist Poale Zion and the orthodox religious Polish Mizrahi. The General Zionist party became the most prominent Jewish party in the interwar period and in the 1919 elections to the first Polish Sejm since the partitions, gained 50% of the Jewish vote.

In 1914, the German Zionist Max Bodenheimer founded the short-lived German Committee for Freeing of Russian Jews, with the goal of establishing a buffer state (Pufferstaat) within the Jewish Pale of Settlement, composed of the former Polish provinces annexed by Russia, being de facto protectorate of the German Empire that would free Jews in the region from Russian oppression. The plan, known as the League of East European States, soon proved unpopular with both German officials and Bodenheimer's colleagues, and was dead by the following year.

== Interbellum (1918–1939) ==
=== Polish Jews and the struggle for Poland's independence ===
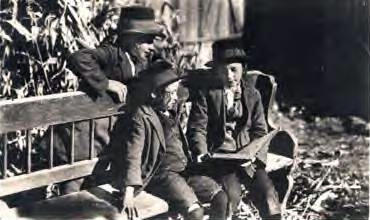
Hasidic schoolchildren in Łódź, c. 1910s, during Partitions

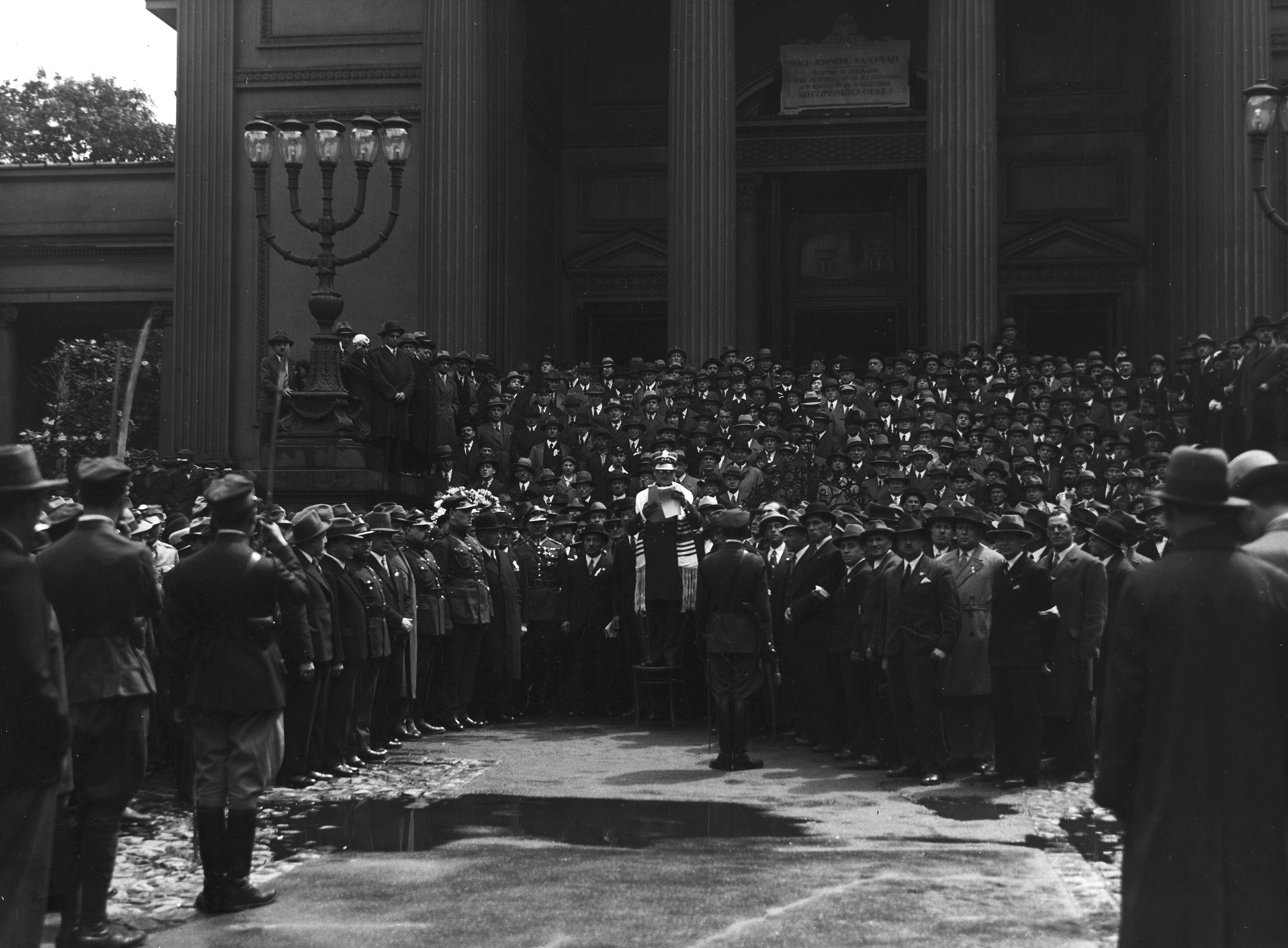
Rabbi Baruch Steinberg before Warsaw Great Synagogue (1933), reading roll call of the fallen, organized by Union of Jewish Fighters for Polish Independence

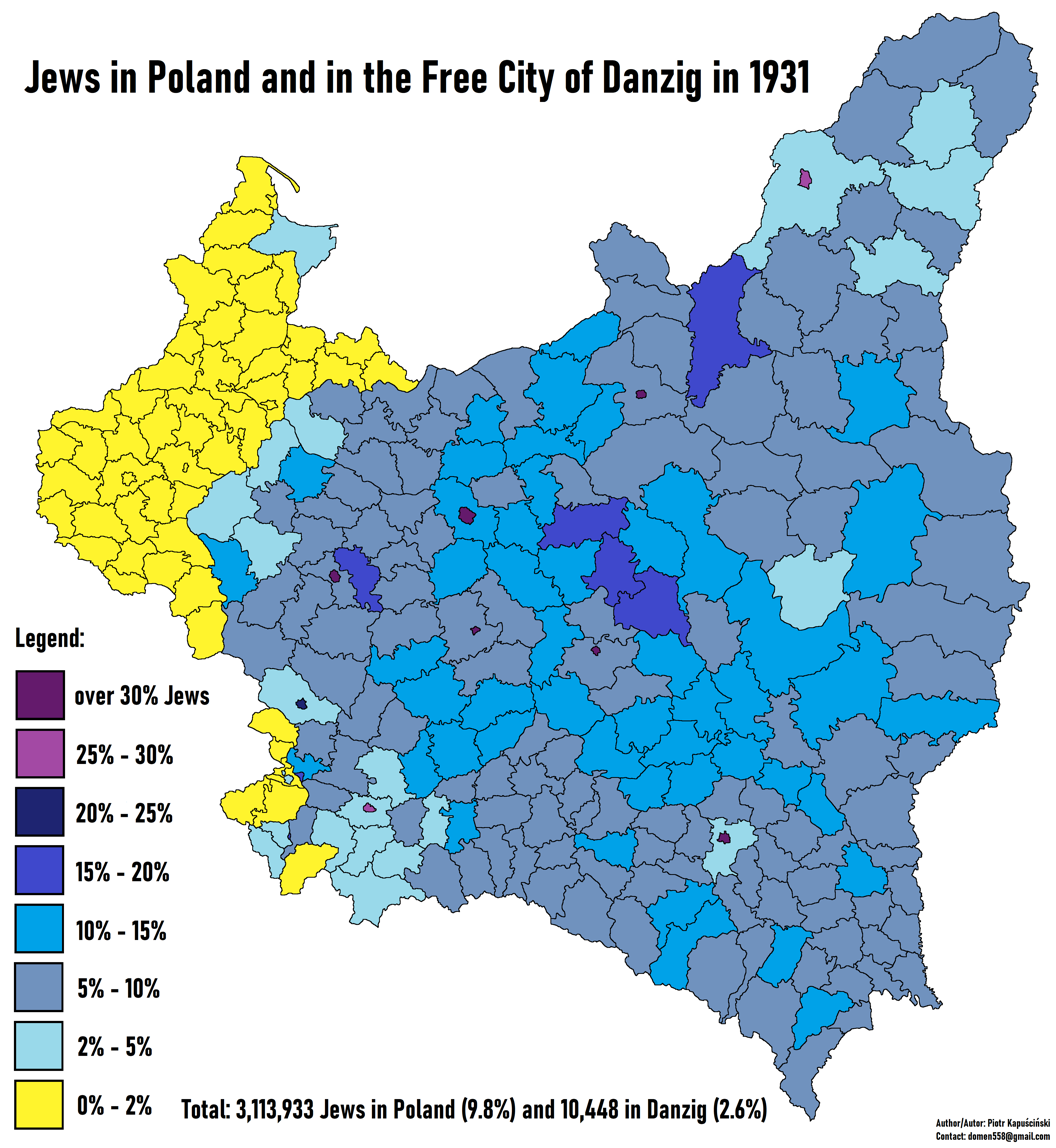
Percentage of Jewish (by religion) population in each county of Poland according to the 1931 census

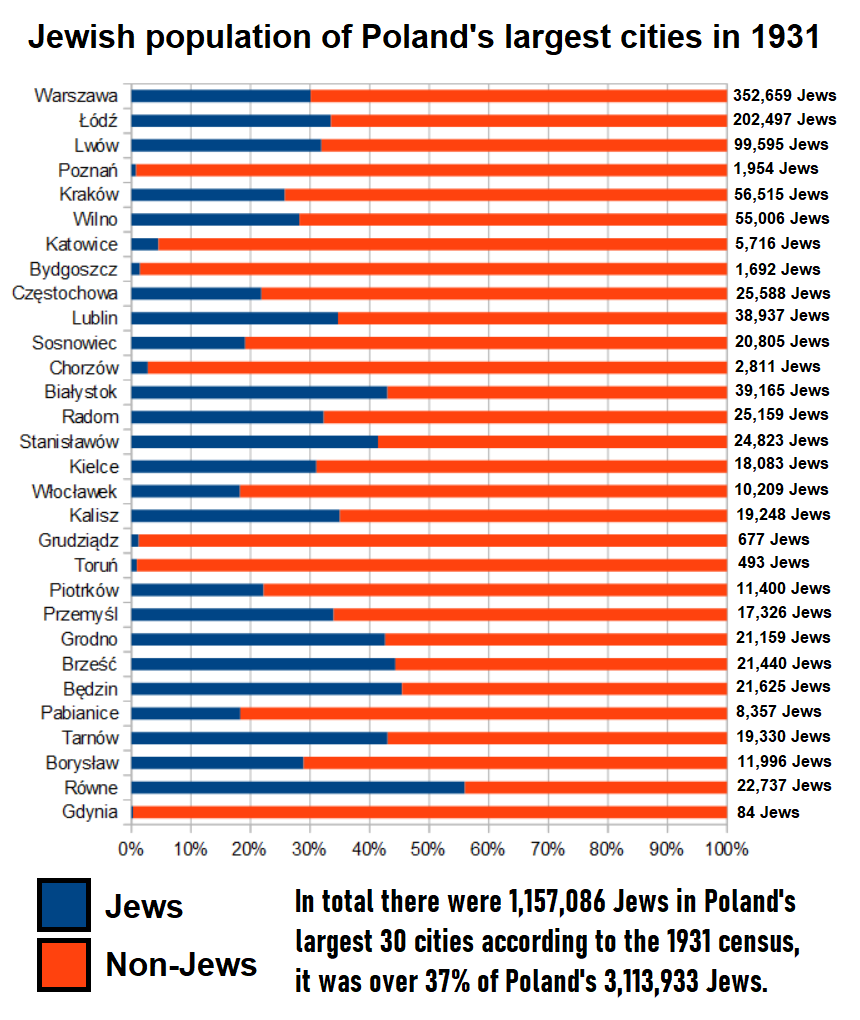
Jewish population of Poland's largest cities in 1931

While most Polish Jews were neutral to the idea of a Polish state, many played a significant role in the fight for Poland's independence during World War I. Around 650 Jews—more than all other minorities combined—joined the Legiony Polskie formed by Józef Piłsudski. Prominent Jews (including Herman Feldstein, Henryk Eile, Samuel Herschthal, Zygmunt Leser, Henryk Orlean, and Wiktor Chajes) were among the members of the KTSSN, which formed the nucleus of the interim government of re-emerging sovereign Poland.

Other Jews were opposed to the formation of a Polish state. For example, the Committee for the East, founded by German Jewish activists, which promoted the idea of Jews in the east becoming the "spearhead of German expansionism", serving as "Germany's reliable vassals" against other ethnic groups in the region and serving as a “living wall” against the aims of Polish separatists.

In the aftermath of the Great War localized conflicts engulfed Eastern Europe between 1917 and 1919. Many attacks were launched against Jews during the Russian Civil War, the Polish–Ukrainian War, and the Polish–Soviet War ending with the Treaty of Riga. Just after the end of World War I, the West became alarmed by reports about alleged massive pogroms in Poland against Jews. Pressure for government action reached the point where U.S. President Woodrow Wilson sent an official commission to investigate the matter. The commission, led by Henry Morgenthau, Sr., concluded in its Morgenthau Report that allegations of pogroms were exaggerated. It identified eight incidents in the years 1918–1919 out of 37 mostly empty claims for damages, and estimated the number of victims at 280. Four of these were attributed to the actions of deserters and undisciplined individual soldiers; none was blamed on official government policy. Among the incidents, during the battle for Pińsk a commander of Polish infantry regiment accused a group of Jewish men of plotting against the Poles and ordered the execution of thirty-five Jewish men and youth. The Morgenthau Report found the charge to be "devoid of foundation" even though their meeting was illegal to the extent of being treasonable. In the Lwów (Lviv) pogrom, which occurred in 1918 during the Polish–Ukrainian War of independence a day after the Poles captured Lviv from the Sich Riflemen – the report concluded – 64 Jews had been killed (other accounts put the number at 72). In Warsaw, soldiers of Blue Army assaulted Jews in the streets, but were punished by military authorities. Many other events in Poland were later found to have been exaggerated, especially by contemporary newspapers such as The New York Times, although serious abuses against the Jews, including pogroms, continued elsewhere, especially in Ukraine.

The historians Anna Cichopek-Gajraj and Glenn Dynner state that 130 pogroms of Jews occurred on Polish territories from 1918 to 1921, resulting in as many as 300 deaths, with many attacks conceived as reprisals against supposed Jewish economic power and their supposed "Judeo-Bolshevism" The atrocities committed by the young Polish army and its allies in 1919 during their Kiev operation against the Bolsheviks had a profound impact on the foreign perception of the re-emerging Polish state. Concerns over the fate of Poland's Jews led the Western powers to pressure Polish President Paderewski to sign the Minority Protection Treaty (the Little Treaty of Versailles), protecting the rights of minorities in new Poland including Jews and Germans. This in turn resulted in Poland's 1921 March Constitution granting Jews the same legal rights as other citizens and guaranteed them religious tolerance and freedom of religious holidays.

=== Population ===
The number of Jews immigrating to Poland from Ukraine and Soviet Russia during the interwar period grew rapidly. Jewish population in the area of former Congress of Poland increased sevenfold between 1816 and 1921, from around 213,000 to roughly 1,500,000. According to the Polish national census of 1921, there were 2,845,364 Jews living in the Second Polish Republic. According to the national census of 1931, there were 3,113,933 Jews living in Poland. By late 1938 that number had grown to approximately 3,310,000. The average rate of permanent settlement was about 30,000 per annum. At the same time, every year around 100,000 Jews were passing through Poland in unofficial emigration overseas Between the end of the Polish–Soviet War and late 1938, the Jewish population of the Republic had grown by over 464,000. According to the 1931 census one city had over 350,000 Jewish inhabitants (Warsaw), one city had over 200,000 Jewish inhabitants (Łódź), one city had around 100,000 Jewish inhabitants (Lwóv) and two cities had over 50,000 Jewish inhabitants each (Kraków and Wilno). In total these five cities had 766,272 Jews which was almost 25% of the total Jewish population of Poland. In cities and towns larger than 25,000 inhabitants there lived nearly 44% of Poland's Jews.

The table below shows the Jewish population of Poland's cities and towns with over 25,000 inhabitants according to the 1931 census:

Jewish population in cities and towns of Poland with at least 25,000 inhabitants in 1931
City or town #	Voivodeship	City or town	Total population	Jews	Non-Jews	Percentage of Jews
1	Warsaw Voivodeship	Warsaw	1171898	352659	819239	30.1%
2	Łódź Voivodeship	Łódź	604629	202497	402132	33.5%
3	Lwów Voivodeship	Lwów	312231	99595	212636	31.9%
4	Poznań Voivodeship	Poznań	246470	1954	244516	0.8%
5	Kraków Voivodeship	Kraków	219286	56515	162771	25.8%
6	Wilno Voivodeship	Wilno	195071	55006	140065	28.2%
7	Silesian Voivodeship	Katowice	126058	5716	120342	4.5%
8	Poznań Voivodeship	Bydgoszcz	117200	1692	115508	1.4%
9	Kielce Voivodeship	Częstochowa	117179	25588	91591	21.8%
10	Lublin Voivodeship	Lublin	112285	38937	73348	34.7%
11	Kielce Voivodeship	Sosnowiec	108959	20805	88154	19.1%
12	Silesian Voivodeship	Chorzów	101977	2811	99166	2.8%
13	Białystok Voivodeship	Białystok	91101	39165	51936	43.0%
14	Kielce Voivodeship	Radom	77902	25159	52743	32.3%
15	Stanisławów Voivodeship	Stanisławów	59960	24823	35137	41.4%
16	Kielce Voivodeship	Kielce	58236	18083	40153	31.1%
17	Warsaw Voivodeship	Włocławek	55966	10209	45757	18.2%
18	Łódź Voivodeship	Kalisz	55007	19248	35759	35.0%
19	Pomeranian Voivodeship	Grudziądz	54014	677	53337	1.3%
20	Pomeranian Voivodeship	Toruń	53993	493	53500	0.9%
21	Łódź Voivodeship	Piotrków	51349	11400	39949	22.2%
22	Lwów Voivodeship	Przemyśl	51038	17326	33712	33.9%
23	Białystok Voivodeship	Grodno	49669	21159	28510	42.6%
24	Polesie Voivodeship	Brześć	48385	21440	26945	44.3%
25	Kielce Voivodeship	Będzin	47597	21625	25972	45.4%
26	Łódź Voivodeship	Pabianice	45670	8357	37313	18.3%
27	Kraków Voivodeship	Tarnów	44927	19330	25597	43.0%
28	Lwów Voivodeship	Borysław	41496	11996	29500	28.9%
29	Wołyń Voivodeship	Równe	40612	22737	17875	56.0%
30	Łódź Voivodeship	Tomaszów Maz.	38020	11310	26710	29.7%
31	Kielce Voivodeship	Dąbrowa Górnicza	36942	5150	31792	13.9%
32	Lublin Voivodeship	Siedlce	36931	14793	22138	40.1%
33	Tarnopol Voivodeship	Tarnopol	35644	13999	21645	39.3%
34	Wołyń Voivodeship	Łuck	35554	17366	18188	48.8%
35	Stanisławów Voivodeship	Kołomyja	33788	14332	19456	42.4%
36	Pomeranian Voivodeship	Gdynia	33217	84	33133	0.3%
37	Warsaw Voivodeship	Płock	32998	6571	26427	19.9%
38	Kielce Voivodeship	Zawiercie	32872	5677	27195	17.3%
39	Lwów Voivodeship	Drohobycz	32261	12931	19330	40.1%
40	Polesie Voivodeship	Pińsk	31912	20220	11692	63.4%
41	Poznań Voivodeship	Inowrocław	34364	139	34225	0.4%
42	Stanisławów Voivodeship	Stryj	30491	10869	19622	35.6%
43	Kraków Voivodeship	Nowy Sącz	30298	9084	21214	30.0%
44	Poznań Voivodeship	Gniezno	30675	137	30538	0.4%
45	Lublin Voivodeship	Chełm	29074	13537	15537	46.6%
46	Wołyń Voivodeship	Kowel	27677	12842	14835	46.4%
47	Lwów Voivodeship	Rzeszów	26902	11228	15674	41.7%
48	Łódź Voivodeship	Zgierz	26618	4547	22071	17.1%
49	Kielce Voivodeship	Ostrowiec	25908	9934	15974	38.3%
50	Warsaw Voivodeship	Żyrardów	25115	2726	22389	10.9%
51	Białystok Voivodeship	Łomża	25022	8912	16110	35.6%
Total in 51 cities and towns with over 25,000 inhabitants			5052448	1363390	3689058	27.0%

=== Jewish and Polish culture ===
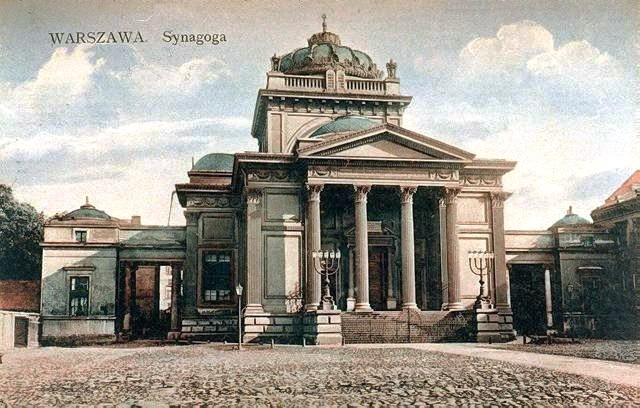
Warsaw Great Synagogue

The newly independent Second Polish Republic had a large and vibrant Jewish minority. By the time World War II began, Poland had the largest concentration of Jews in Europe although many Polish Jews had a separate culture and ethnic identity from Catholic Poles. Some authors have stated that only about 10% of Polish Jews during the interwar period could be considered "assimilated" while more than 80% could be readily recognized as Jews.

According to the 1931 National Census there were 3,130,581 Polish Jews measured by the declaration of their religion. Estimating the population increase and the emigration from Poland between 1931 and 1939, there were probably 3,474,000 Jews in Poland as of 1 September 1939 (approximately 10% of the total population) primarily centered in large and smaller cities: 77% lived in cities and 23% in the villages. They made up about 50%, and in some cases even 70% of the population of smaller towns, especially in Eastern Poland. Prior to World War II, the Jewish population of Łódź numbered about 233,000, roughly one-third of the city's population. The city of Lwów (now in Ukraine) had the third-largest Jewish population in Poland, numbering 110,000 in 1939 (42%). Wilno (now in Lithuania) had a Jewish community of nearly 100,000, about 45% of the city's total. In 1938, Kraków's Jewish population numbered over 60,000, or about 25% of the city's total population. In 1939 there were 375,000 Jews in Warsaw or one-third of the city's population. Only New York City had more Jewish residents than Warsaw.

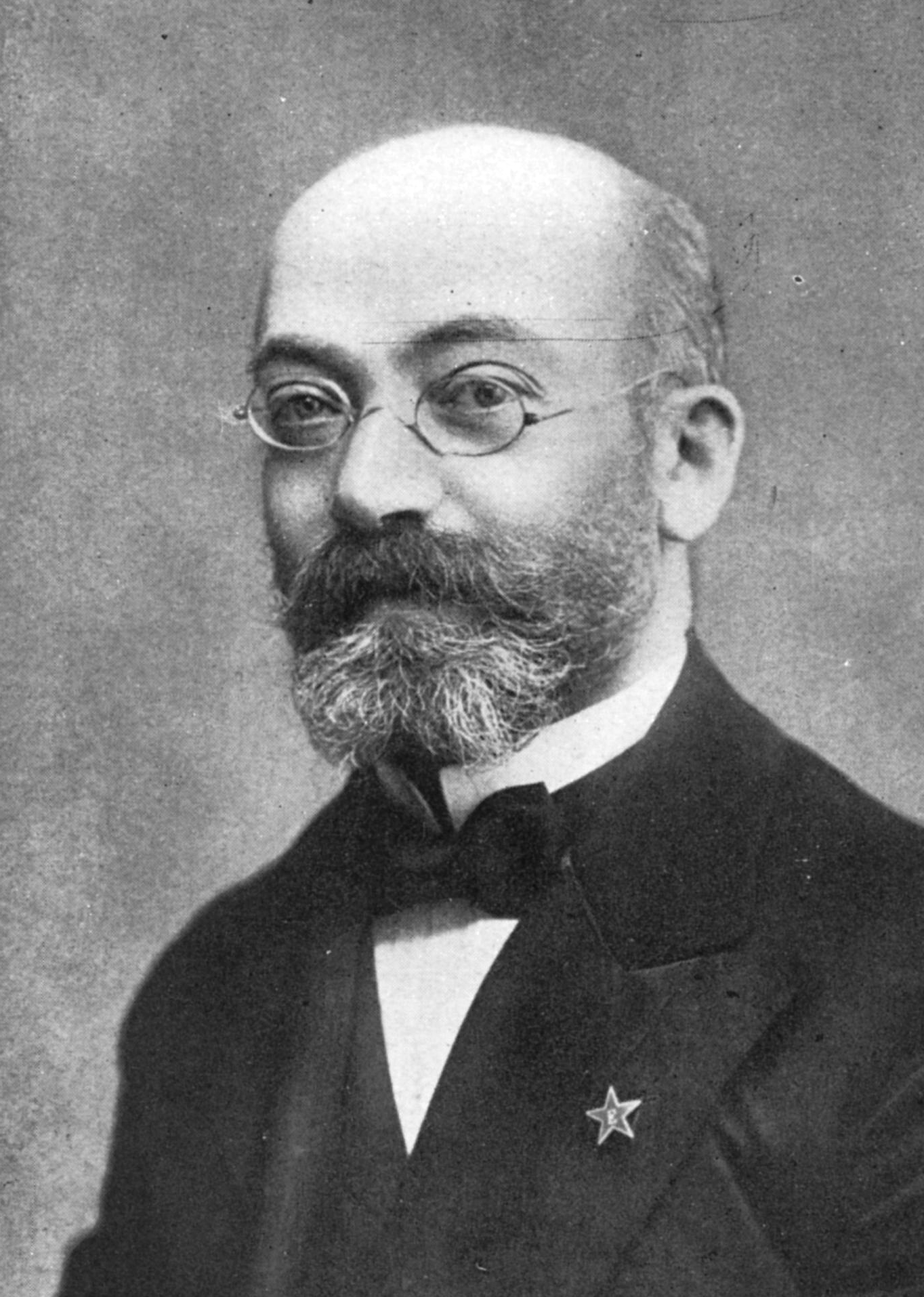
L. L. Zamenhof, creator of Esperanto

Jewish youth and religious groups, diverse political parties and Zionist organizations, newspapers and theatre flourished. Jews owned land and real estate, participated in retail and manufacturing and in the export industry. Their religious beliefs spanned the range from Orthodox Hasidic Judaism to Liberal Judaism.

The Polish language, rather than Yiddish, was increasingly used by the young Warsaw Jews who did not have a problem in identifying themselves fully as Jews, Varsovians and Poles. Jews such as Bruno Schulz were entering the mainstream of Polish society, though many thought of themselves as a separate nationality within Poland. Most children were enrolled in Jewish religious schools, which used to limit their ability to speak Polish. As a result, according to the 1931 census, 79% of the Jews declared Yiddish as their first language, and only 12% listed Polish, with the remaining 9% being Hebrew. In contrast, the overwhelming majority of German-born Jews of this period spoke German as their first language. During the school year of 1937–1938 there were 226 elementary schools and twelve high schools as well as fourteen vocational schools with either Yiddish or Hebrew as the instructional language. Jewish political parties, both the Socialist General Jewish Labour Bund (The Bund), as well as parties of the Zionist right and left wing and religious conservative movements, were represented in the Sejm (the Polish Parliament) as well as in the regional councils.

The Jewish cultural scene was particularly vibrant in pre–World War II Poland, with numerous Jewish publications and more than one hundred periodicals. Yiddish authors, most notably Isaac Bashevis Singer, went on to achieve international acclaim as classic Jewish writers; Singer won the 1978 Nobel Prize in Literature. His brother Israel Joshua Singer was also a writer. Other Jewish authors of the period, such as Bruno Schulz, Julian Tuwim, Marian Hemar, Emanuel Schlechter and Bolesław Leśmian, as well as Konrad Tom and Jerzy Jurandot, were less well known internationally, but made important contributions to Polish literature. Some Polish writers had Jewish roots e.g. Jan Brzechwa (a favorite poet of Polish children). Singer Jan Kiepura, born of a Jewish mother and Polish father, was one of the most popular artists of that era, and pre-war songs of Jewish composers, including Henryk Wars, Jerzy Petersburski, Artur Gold, Henryk Gold, Zygmunt Białostocki, Szymon Kataszek and Jakub Kagan, are still widely known in Poland today. Painters became known as well for their depictions of Jewish life. Among them were Maurycy Gottlieb, Artur Markowicz, and Maurycy Trębacz, with younger artists like Chaim Goldberg coming up in the ranks.

Many Jews were film producers and directors, e.g. Michał Waszyński (The Dybbuk), Aleksander Ford (Children Must Laugh).

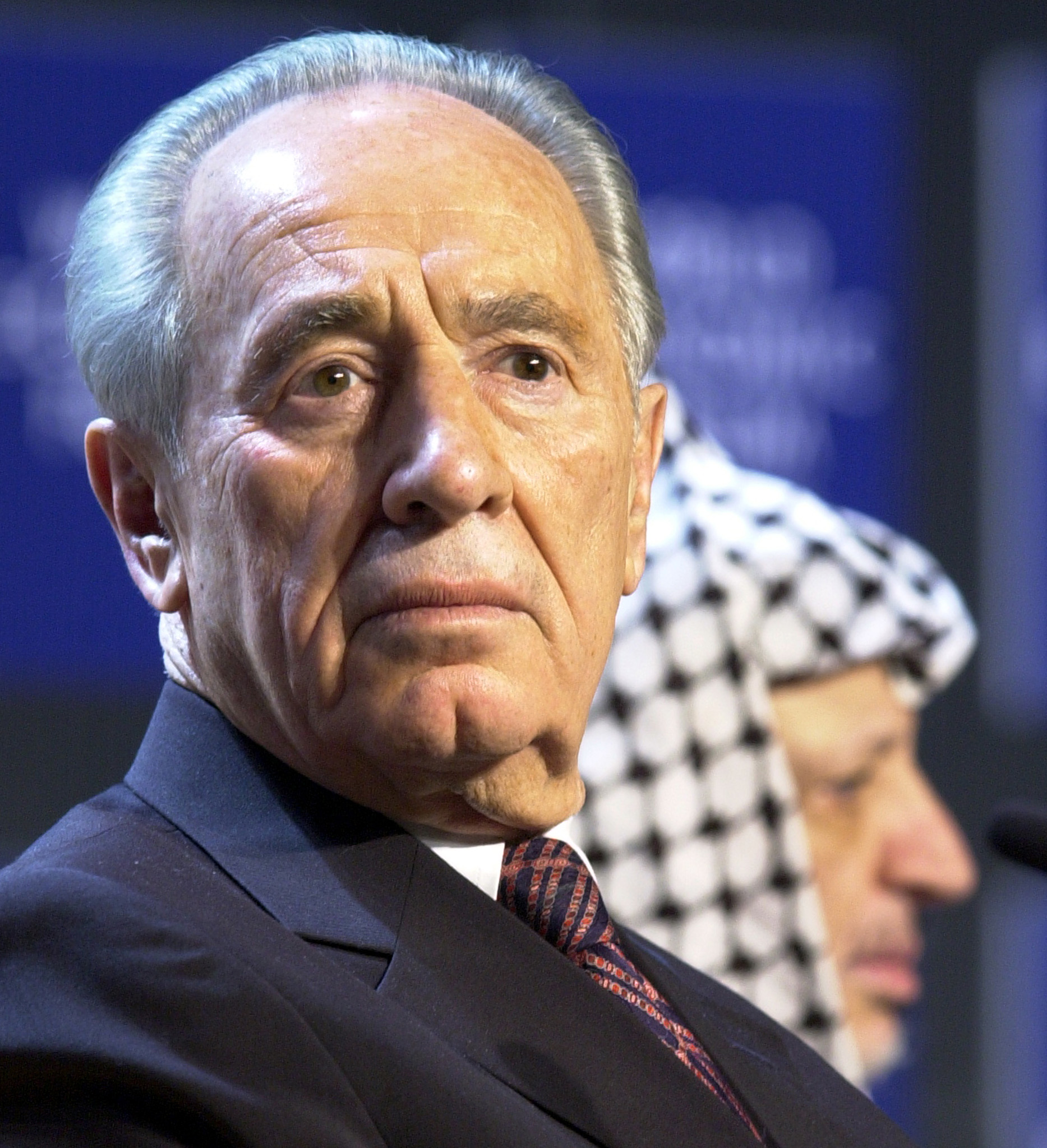
Shimon Peres, born in Poland as Szymon Perski, served as the ninth President of Israel between 2007 and 2014

Scientist Leopold Infeld, mathematician Stanisław Ulam, Alfred Tarski, and professor Adam Ulam contributed to the world of science. Other Polish Jews who gained international recognition are Moses Schorr, Ludwik Zamenhof (the creator of Esperanto), Georges Charpak, Samuel Eilenberg, Emanuel Ringelblum, and Artur Rubinstein, just to name a few from the long list. The term "genocide" was coined by Rafał Lemkin (1900–1959), a Polish–Jewish legal scholar. Leonid Hurwicz was awarded the 2007 Nobel Prize in Economics. The YIVO (Jidiszer Wissenszaftlecher Institute) Scientific Institute was based in Wilno before transferring to New York during the war. In Warsaw, important centers of Judaic scholarship, such the Main Judaic Library and the Institute of Judaic Studies were located, along with numerous Talmudic Schools (Jeszybots), religious centers and synagogues, many of which were of high architectural quality. Yiddish theatre also flourished; Poland had fifteen Yiddish theatres and theatrical groups. Warsaw was home to the most important Yiddish theater troupe of the time, the Vilna Troupe, which staged the first performance of The Dybbuk in 1920 at the Elyseum Theatre. Some future Israeli leaders studied at University of Warsaw, including Menachem Begin and Yitzhak Shamir.

There also were several Jewish sports clubs, with some of them, such as Hasmonea Lwów and Jutrzenka Kraków, winning promotion to the Polish First Football League. A Polish–Jewish footballer, Józef Klotz, scored the first ever goal for the Poland national football team. Another athlete, Alojzy Ehrlich, won several medals in the table-tennis tournaments. Many of these clubs belonged to the Maccabi World Union.

=== Between antisemitism and support for Zionism and Jewish state in Palestine ===
==== Jewish life and social separation ====
In contrast to the prevailing trends in Europe at the time, in interwar Poland an increasing percentage of Jews were pushed to live a life separate from the non-Jewish majority. The antisemitic rejection of Jews, whether for religious or racial reasons, caused estrangement and growing tensions between Jews and Poles. It is significant in this regard that in 1921, 74.2% of Polish Jews spoke Yiddish or Hebrew as their native language; by 1931, the number had risen to 87%.

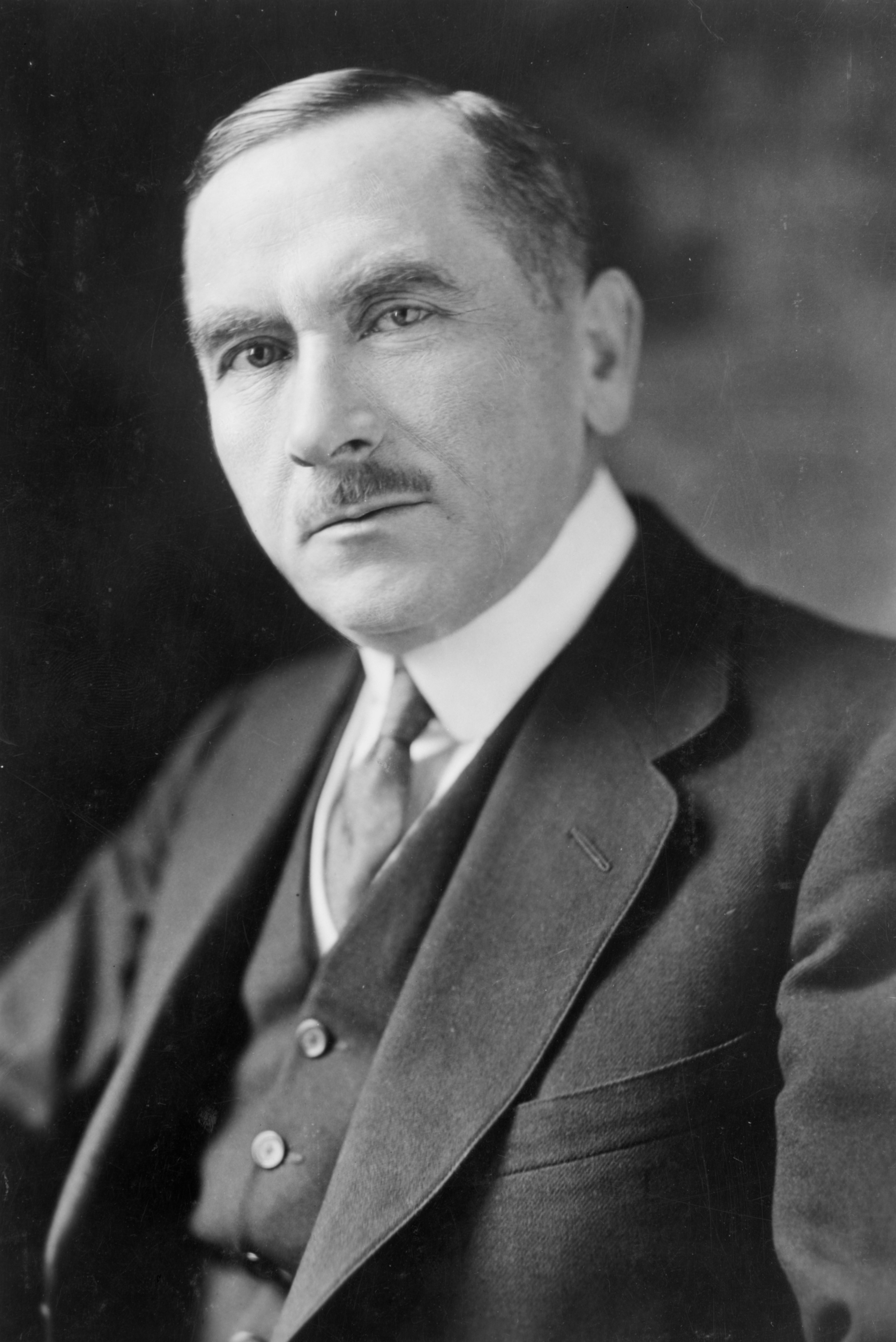
Roman Dmowski, the founder and chief ideologue of the National Democracy (Endecja) in Poland, often ostentatiously demonstrated antisemitism

Besides the persistent effects of the Great Depression, the strengthening of antisemitism in Polish society was also a consequence of the influence of Nazi Germany. Following the German-Polish non-aggression pact of 1934, the antisemitic tropes of Nazi propaganda had become more common in Polish politics, where they were echoed by the National Democratic movement. One of its founders and chief ideologue Roman Dmowski was obsessed with an international conspiracy of freemasons and Jews, and in his works linked Marxism with Judaism. The position of the Catholic Church had also become increasingly hostile to the Jews, who in the 1920s and 1930s were increasingly seen as agents of Bolshevism. Anti-Jewish sentiment in the press, discrimination, exclusion, and violence at universities, and the appearance of "anti-Jewish squads" associated with some of the right-wing political parties contributed to greater support in the Jewish community for Zionist and socialist ideas.

In 1925, Polish Zionist members of the Sejm reached an agreement with prime minister Władysław Grabski granting Jews certain cultural and religious rights in exchange for support of Polish nationalist interests. The Polish government later refused to honor many aspects of the agreement. During the 1930s, Revisionist Zionists viewed the government as an ally and promoted cooperation between Zionists and Polish nationalists, despite the antisemitism of the government.

Matters improved for a time under the rule of Józef Piłsudski (1926–1935). Piłsudski countered Endecja's Polonization with the 'state assimilation' policy: citizens were judged by their loyalty to the state, not by their nationality. The years 1926–1935 were favourably viewed by many Polish Jews, whose situation improved especially under the cabinet of Pilsudski's appointee Kazimierz Bartel. However, a combination of various factors, including the Great Depression, meant that the situation of Jewish Poles was never very satisfactory, and it deteriorated again after Piłsudski's death in May 1935. The Jewish industries were negatively affected by the development of mass production and the advent of department stores offering ready-made products. The traditional sources of livelihood for the estimated 300,000 Jewish family-run businesses in the country began to vanish, contributing to a growing trend toward isolationism and internal self-sufficiency. The difficult situation in the private sector led to increased Jewish enrollment in higher education, which it was speculated contributed to a backlash against Jewish students.

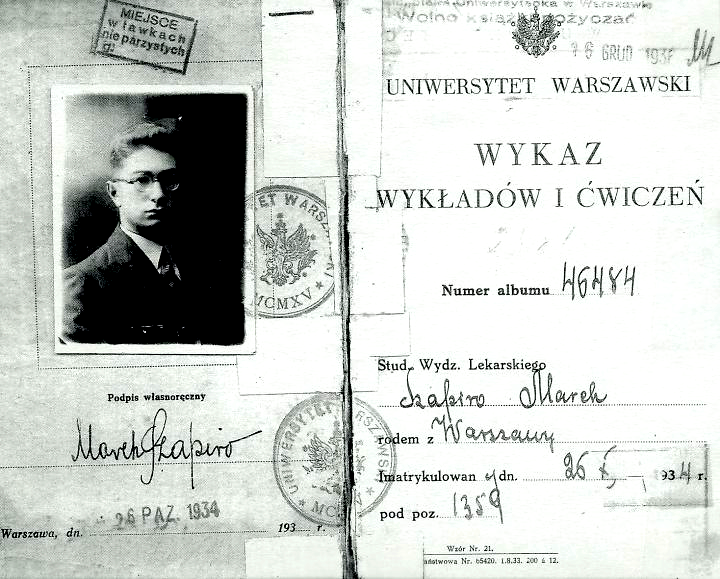
Student's book (indeks) of Jewish medical student Marek Szapiro at Warsaw University, with rectangular "ghetto benches" ("odd-numbered-benches") stamp

The interwar Polish government provided military training to the Zionist Betar paramilitary movement, whose members admired the Polish nationalist camp and imitated some of its aspects. Uniformed members of Betar marched and performed at Polish public ceremonies alongside Polish scouts and military, with their weapons training provided by Polish institutions and military officers; Menachem Begin, one of its leaders, called for its members to defend Poland in case of war, and the organisation raised both Polish and Zionist flags.

==== Antisemitism and economic discrimination ====
With the influence of the Endecja (National Democracy) party growing, antisemitism gathered new momentum in Poland and was most felt in smaller towns and in spheres in which Jews came into direct contact with Poles. Further academic harassment, such as the introduction of ghetto benches, which forced Jewish students to sit in sections of the lecture halls reserved exclusively for them, anti-Jewish riots, and semi-official or unofficial quotas (Numerus clausus) introduced in 1937 in some universities, halved the number of Jews in Polish universities between independence (1918) and the late 1930s. The restrictions were so inclusive that – while the Jews made up 20.4% of the student body in 1928 – by 1937 their share was down to only 7.5%, out of the total population of 9.75% Jews in the country according to 1931 census.

While the average per capita income of Polish Jews in 1929 was 40% above the national average, they were a very heterogeneous community, some poor, some wealthy. Many Jews worked as shoemakers and tailors, as well as in the liberal professions; doctors (56% of all doctors in Poland), teachers (43%), journalists (22%) and lawyers (33%). In 1929, about a third of artisans and home workers and a majority of shopkeepers were Jewish.

Although many Jews were educated, they were almost completely excluded from government jobs; as a result, the unemployment rate was four times higher among the Jewish population than in the general population, a problem compounded by the fact that almost no Jews received unemployment benefits. In 1937 the Catholic trade unions of Polish doctors and lawyers restricted their new members to Christian Poles. In a similar manner, the Jewish trade unions excluded non-Jewish professionals from their ranks after 1918. The bulk of Jewish workers were organized in the Jewish trade unions under the influence of the Jewish socialists who split in 1923 to join the Communist Party of Poland and the Second International.

Anti-Jewish sentiment in Poland had reached its zenith in the years leading to the Second World War. Between 1935 and 1937 seventy-nine Jews were killed and 500 injured in anti-Jewish incidents. National policy was such that the Jews who largely worked at home and in small shops were excluded from welfare benefits. In the provincial capital of Łuck Jews constituted 48.5% of the diverse multiethnic population of 35,550 Poles, Ukrainians, Belarusians and others. Łuck had the largest Jewish community in the voivodeship. In the capital of Brześć in 1936 Jews constituted 41.3% of general population and some 80.3% of private enterprises were owned by Jews. 32% of the population of Radom was Jewish, with 90% of small businesses in the city owned and operated by Jews, including tinsmiths, locksmiths, jewellers, tailors, hat makers, hairdressers, carpenters, house painters and wallpaper installers, shoemakers, as well as most of the artisan bakers and clock repairers. In Lubartów, 53.6% of the town's population were Jewish also along with most of its economy. In a town of Luboml, 3,807 Jews lived among its 4,169 inhabitants, constituting the essence of its social and political life.

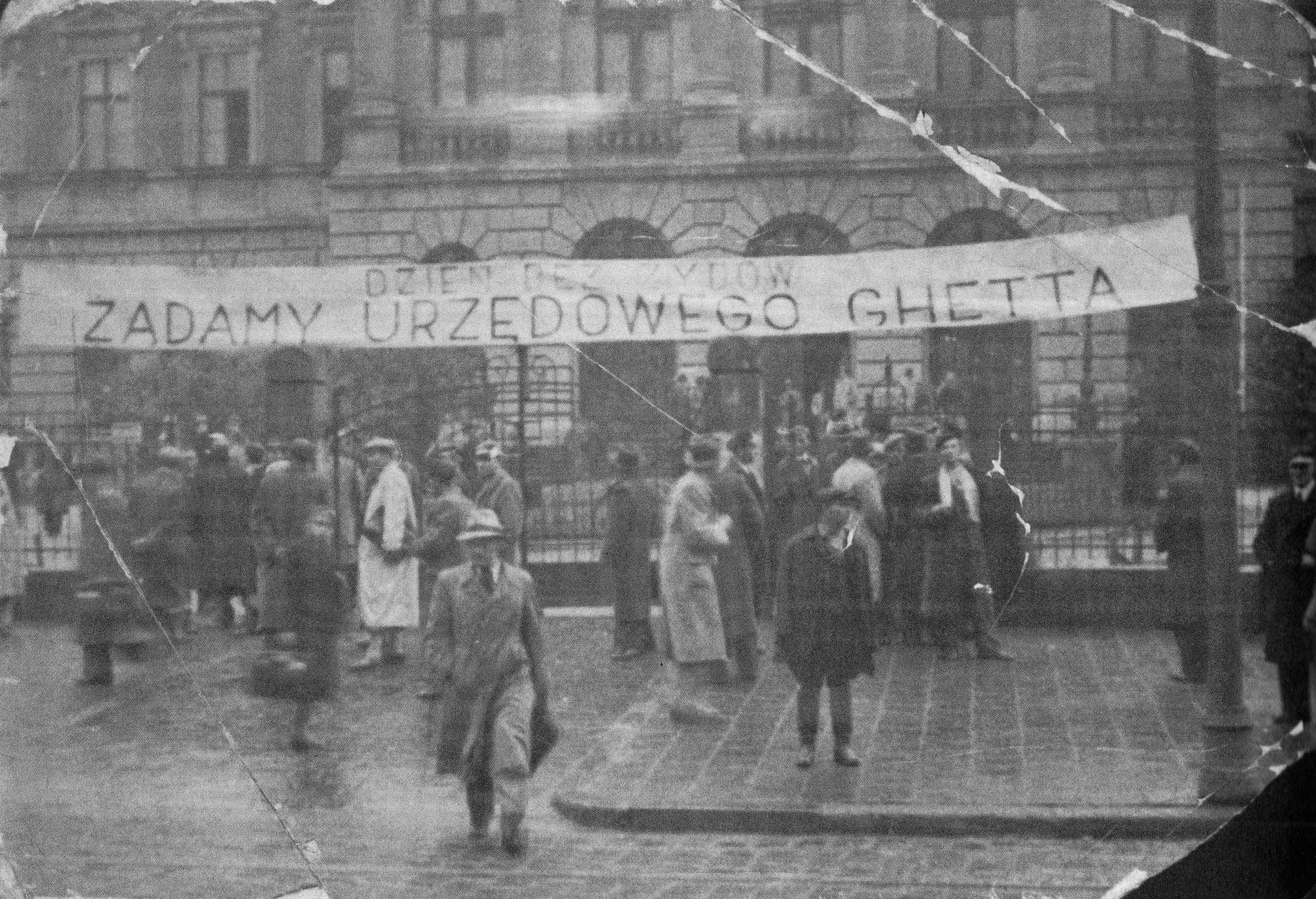
Demonstration of Polish students demanding implementation of "ghetto benches" at Lwów Polytechnic (1937).

A national boycott of Jewish businesses and advocacy for their confiscation was promoted by the National Democracy party and Prime Minister Felicjan Sławoj-Składkowski, declared an "economic war against Jews", introducing the term "Christian shop". A national movement to prevent the Jews from kosher slaughter of animals, with animal rights as the stated motivation, was also organized. By the end of the 1930s, a substantial portion of Polish Jews lived in grinding poverty, due to the effects of the Great Depression and rioting.

The main strain of antisemitism in Poland during this time was motivated by Catholic religious beliefs and centuries-old myths such as the blood libel. This religious-based antisemitism was sometimes joined with an ultra-nationalistic stereotype of Jews as disloyal to the Polish nation. On the eve of World War II, many typical Polish Christians believed that there were far too many Jews in the country, and the Polish government became increasingly concerned with the "Jewish question". According to the British Embassy in Warsaw, in 1936 emigration was the only solution to the Jewish question that found wide support in all Polish political parties. The Polish government condemned wanton violence against the Jewish minority, fearing international repercussions, but shared the view that the Jewish minority hindered Poland's development; in January 1937 Foreign Minister Józef Beck declared that Poland could house 500,000 Jews, and hoped that over the next 30 years 80,000–100,000 Jews a year would leave Poland.

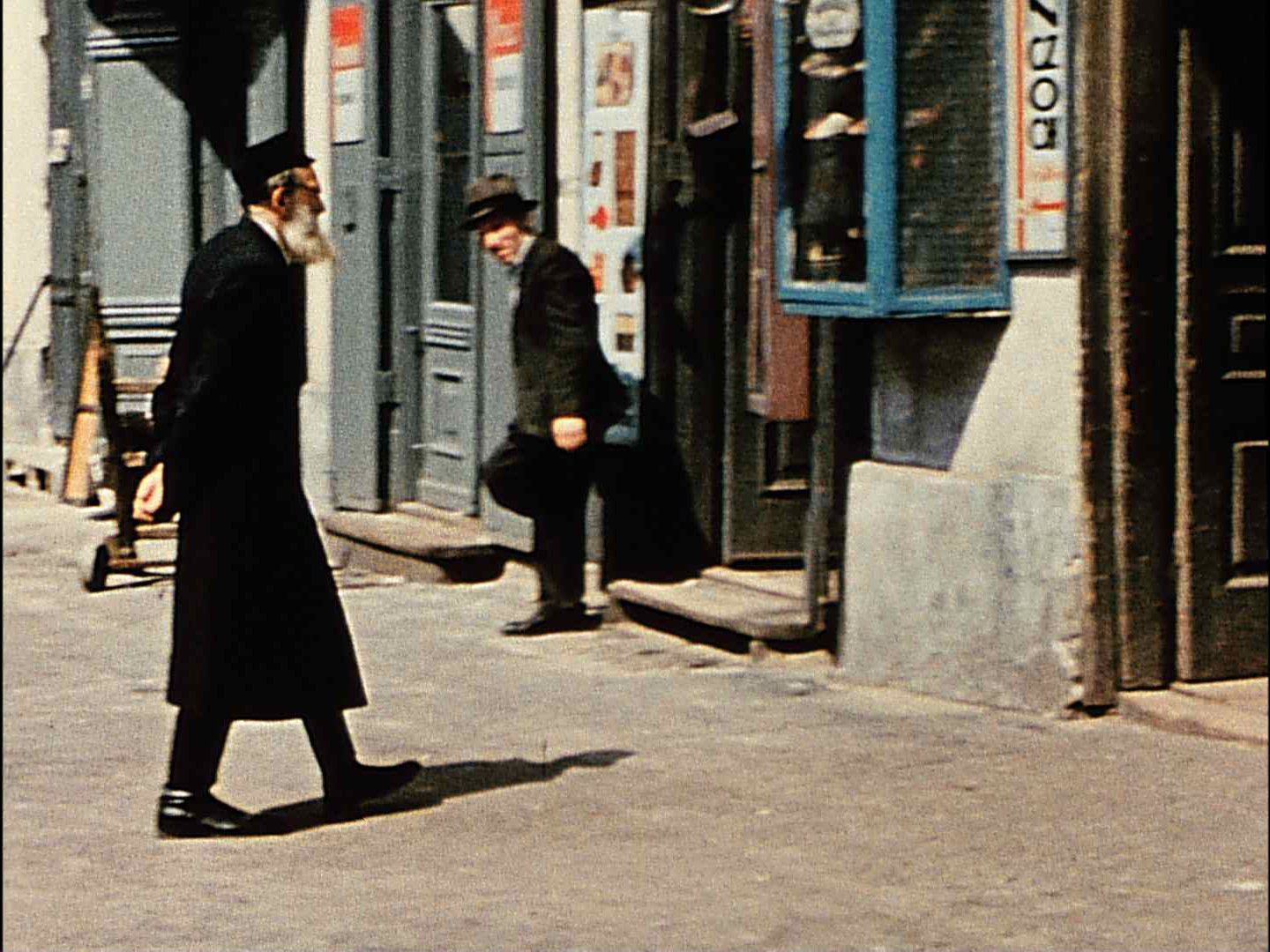
Jewish merchants in Warsaw, in the courtyard of a tenement house on Nalewki Street, August 1939.

==== Polish support for Zionist emigration ====
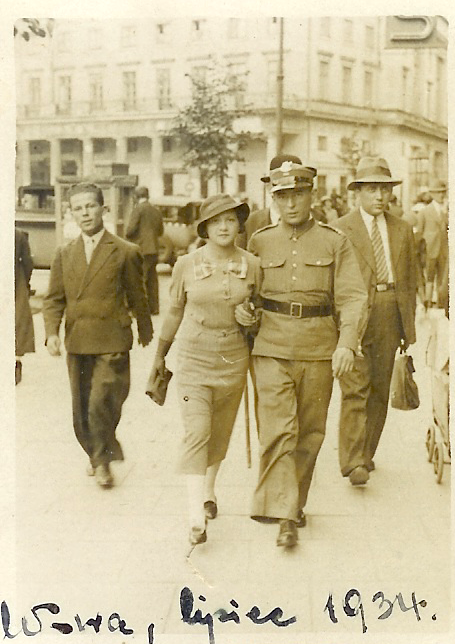
Hela and Selig Hoffenstand, a Jewish couple on the streets of Warsaw, 1934. Selig served in the Polish army. The couple immigrated to Mandatory Palestine in 1935. Most of his family stayed there and perished in the Holocaust

The Polish government embraced the vision of Ze'ev Jabotinsky, the founder of Revisionist Zionism, and pursued a policy of supporting the creation of a Jewish state in Palestine. It lobbied for creation of a Jewish state in the League of Nations and other international venues, proposing increased emigration quotas and opposing the Partition Plan of Palestine on behalf of Zionist activists. As Jabotinsky envisioned in his "Evacuation Plan" the settlement of 1.5 million East European Jews within 10 years in Palestine, including 750,000 Polish Jews, he and Beck shared a common goal. Ultimately this proved impossible and illusory, as it lacked both general Jewish and international support. In 1937 Polish Minister of Foreign Affairs Józef Beck declared in the League of Nations his support for the creation of a Jewish state and for an international conference to enable Jewish emigration. Poland helped the Zionist movement by organizing passports and facilitating illegal immigration, and supplied the Haganah with weapons. It also provided extensive support to the Irgun (the military branch of the Revisionist Zionist movement) in the form of military training and weapons. According to Irgun activists, the Polish state supplied the organisation with 25,000 rifles, additional material and weapons, and by summer 1939 Irgun's Warsaw warehouses held 5,000 rifles and 1,000 machine guns. The training and support by Poland allowed the organisation to mobilise 30,000-40,000 men.

In 1938, the Polish government revoked the Polish citizenship of tens-of-thousands Polish Jews who had lived outside the country for an extended period of time. It was feared that many Polish Jews living in Germany and Austria would want to return en masse to Poland to escape anti-Jewish measures. Their property was claimed by the Polish state.

By the time of the German invasion in 1939, antisemitism was escalating, and hostility towards Jews was a mainstay of the right-wing political forces post-Piłsudski regime and also the Catholic Church. Discrimination and violence against Jews had rendered the Polish Jewish population increasingly destitute. Despite the impending threat to the Polish Republic from Nazi Germany, there was little effort seen in the way of reconciliation with Poland's Jewish population. In July 1939 the pro-government Gazeta Polska wrote, "The fact that our relations with the Reich are worsening does not in the least deactivate our program in the Jewish question—there is not and cannot be any common ground between our internal Jewish problem and Poland's relations with the Hitlerite Reich." Escalating hostility towards Polish Jews and an official Polish government desire to remove Jews from Poland continued until the German invasion of Poland.

== World War II and the destruction of Polish Jewry (1939–45) ==
=== Polish September Campaign ===
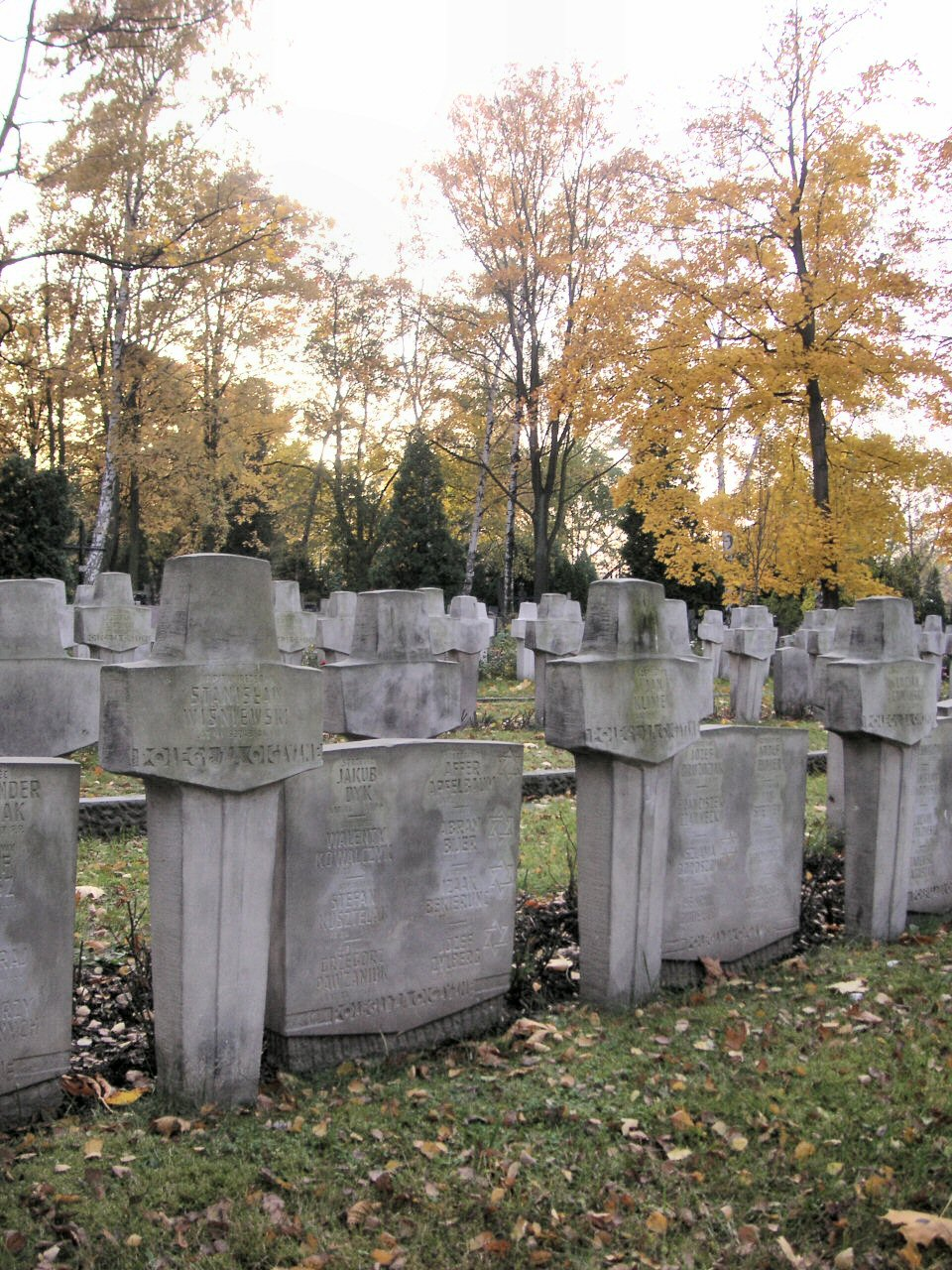
Graves of Jewish–Polish soldiers who died in 1939 September Campaign, Powązki Cemetery

The number of Jews in Poland on 1 September 1939, amounted to about 3,474,000 people. One hundred thirty thousand soldiers of Jewish descent, including Boruch Steinberg, Chief Rabbi of the Polish Military, served in the Polish Army at the outbreak of the Second World War, thus being among the first to launch armed resistance against Nazi Germany. During the September Campaign some 20,000 Jewish civilians and 32,216 Jewish soldiers were killed, while 61,000 were taken prisoner by the Germans; the majority did not survive. The soldiers and non-commissioned officers who were released ultimately found themselves in the Nazi ghettos and labor camps and suffered the same fate as other Jewish civilians in the ensuing Holocaust in Poland. In 1939, Jews constituted 30% of Warsaw's population. With the coming of the war, Jewish and Polish citizens of Warsaw jointly defended the city, putting their differences aside. Polish Jews later served in almost all Polish formations during the entire World War II, many were killed or wounded and very many were decorated for their combat skills and exceptional service. Jews fought with the Polish Armed Forces in the West, in the Soviet-formed Polish People's Army as well as in several underground organizations and as part of Polish partisan units or Jewish partisan formations.

=== Territories annexed by the USSR (1939–1941) ===
The Soviet Union signed the Molotov–Ribbentrop Pact with Nazi Germany on 23 August 1939 containing a protocol about partition of Poland. The German army attacked Poland on 1 September 1939. The Soviet Union followed suit by invading eastern Poland on 17 September 1939. The days between the retreat of the Polish army and the entry of the Red Army, September 18–21, witnessed a pogrom in Grodno, in which 25 Jews were killed (the Soviets later put some of the pogromists on trial).

Within weeks, 61.2% of Polish Jews found themselves under the German occupation, while 38.8% were trapped in the Polish areas annexed by the Soviet Union. Jews under German occupation were immediately maltreated, beaten, publicly executed, and even burnt alive in the synagogue. As a result 350,000 Polish Jews fled from the German-occupied area to the Soviet area. Upon annexing the region, the Soviet government recognized as Soviet citizens Jews (and other non-Poles) who were permanent residents of the area, while offering refugees the choice of either taking on Soviet citizenship or returning to their former homes.

The Soviet annexation was accompanied by the widespread arrests of government officials, police, military personnel, border guards, teachers, priests, judges etc., followed by the NKVD prisoner massacres and massive deportation of 320,000 Polish nationals to the Soviet interior and the Gulag slave labor camps where, as a result of the inhuman conditions, about half of them died before the end of war.

Jewish refugees under the Soviet occupation had little knowledge about what was going on under the Germans since the Soviet media did not report on the goings-on in territories occupied by their Nazi ally. Many people from Western Poland registered for repatriation back to the German zone, including wealthier Jews, as well as some political and social activists from the interwar period.

Synagogues and churches were not yet closed but heavily taxed. The Soviet ruble of little value was immediately equalized to the much higher Polish zloty and by the end of 1939, zloty was abolished. Most economic activity became subject to central planning and the NKVD restrictions. Since the Jewish communities tended to rely more on commerce and small-scale businesses, the confiscations of property affected them to a greater degree than the general populace. The Soviet rule resulted in near collapse of the local economy, characterized by insufficient wages and general shortage of goods and materials. The Jews, like other inhabitants of the region, saw a fall in their living standards.

Under the Soviet policy, ethnic Poles were dismissed and denied access to positions in the civil service. Former senior officials and notable members of the Polish community were arrested and exiled together with their families. At the same time the Soviet authorities encouraged young Jewish communists to fill in the newly emptied government and civil service jobs.

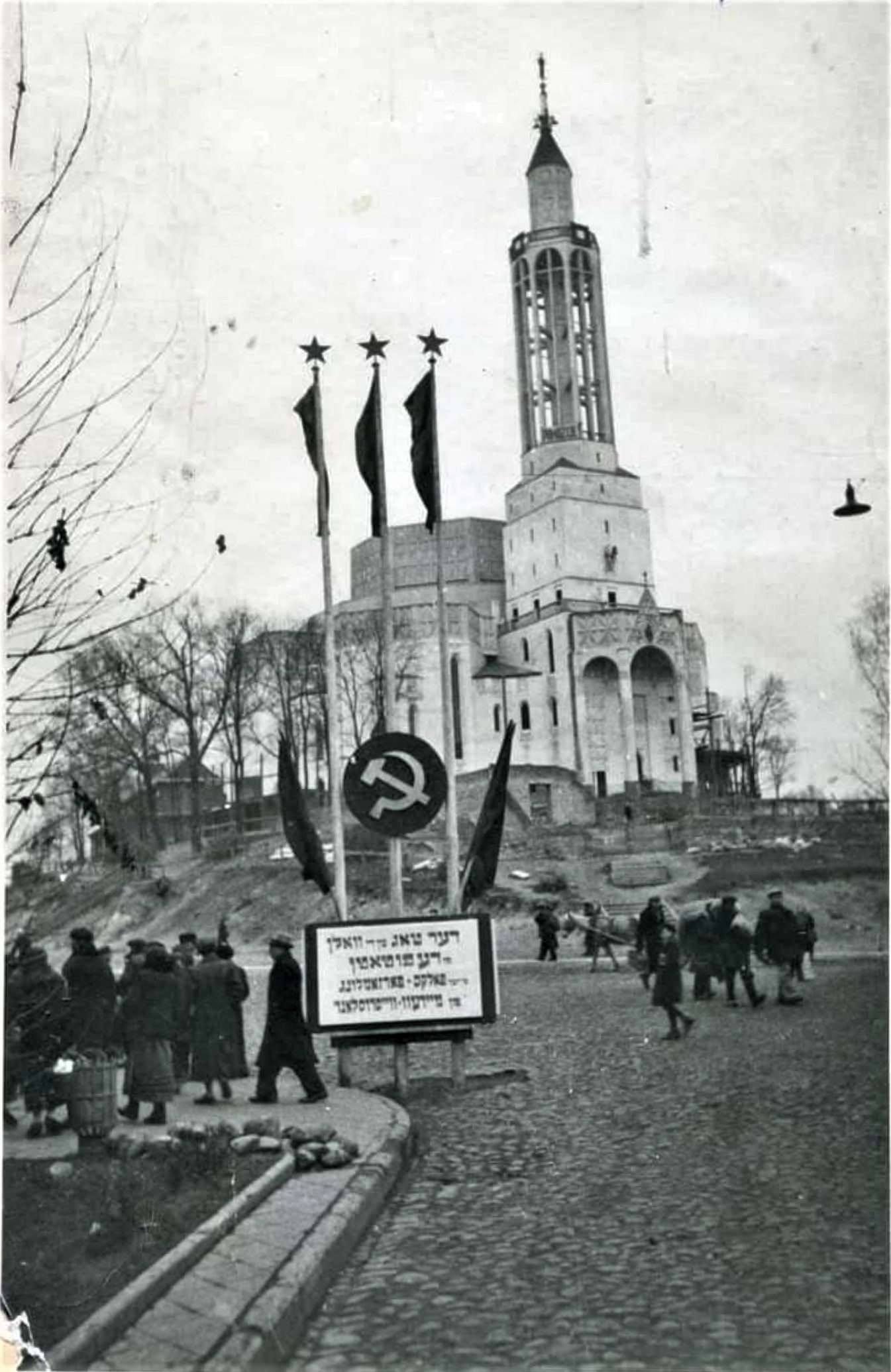
Yiddish election notice for Soviet local government to the People's council of the Byelorussian Soviet Socialist Republic in Białystok, occupied Poland.

While most eastern Poles consolidated themselves around the anti-Soviet sentiments, a portion of the Jewish population, along with the ethnic Belarusian and Ukrainian activists had welcomed invading Soviet forces as their protectors. The general feeling among the Polish Jews was a sense of temporary relief in having escaped the Nazi occupation in the first weeks of war. The Polish poet Aleksander Wat has stated that Jews were more inclined to cooperate with the Soviets. Following Jan Karski's report written in 1940, historian Norman Davies claimed that among the informers and collaborators, the percentage of Jews was striking; likewise, General Władysław Sikorski estimated that 30% of them identified with the communists whilst engaging in provocations; they prepared lists of Polish "class enemies". Other historians have indicated that the level of Jewish collaboration could well have been less than suggested. Historian Martin Dean has written that "few local Jews obtained positions of power under Soviet rule."

The issue of Jewish collaboration with the Soviet occupation remains controversial. Some scholars note that while not pro-Communist, many Jews saw the Soviets as the lesser threat compared to the German Nazis. They stress that stories of Jews welcoming the Soviets on the streets, vividly remembered by many Poles from the eastern part of the country are impressionistic and not reliable indicators of the level of Jewish support for the Soviets. Additionally, it has been noted that some ethnic Poles were as prominent as Jews in filling civil and police positions in the occupation administration, and that Jews, both civilians and in the Polish military, suffered equally at the hands of the Soviet occupiers. Whatever initial enthusiasm for the Soviet occupation Jews might have felt was soon dissipated upon feeling the impact of the suppression of Jewish societal modes of life by the occupiers. The tensions between ethnic Poles and Jews as a result of this period has, according to some historians, taken a toll on relations between Poles and Jews throughout the war, creating until this day, an impasse to Polish–Jewish rapprochement.

A number of younger Jews, often through the pro-Marxist Bund or some Zionist groups, were sympathetic to Communism and Soviet Russia, both of which had been enemies of the Polish Second Republic. As a result of these factors they found it easy after 1939 to participate in the Soviet occupation administration in Eastern Poland, and briefly occupied prominent positions in industry, schools, local government, police and other Soviet-installed institutions. The concept of "Judeo-communism" was reinforced during the period of the Soviet occupation (see Żydokomuna).

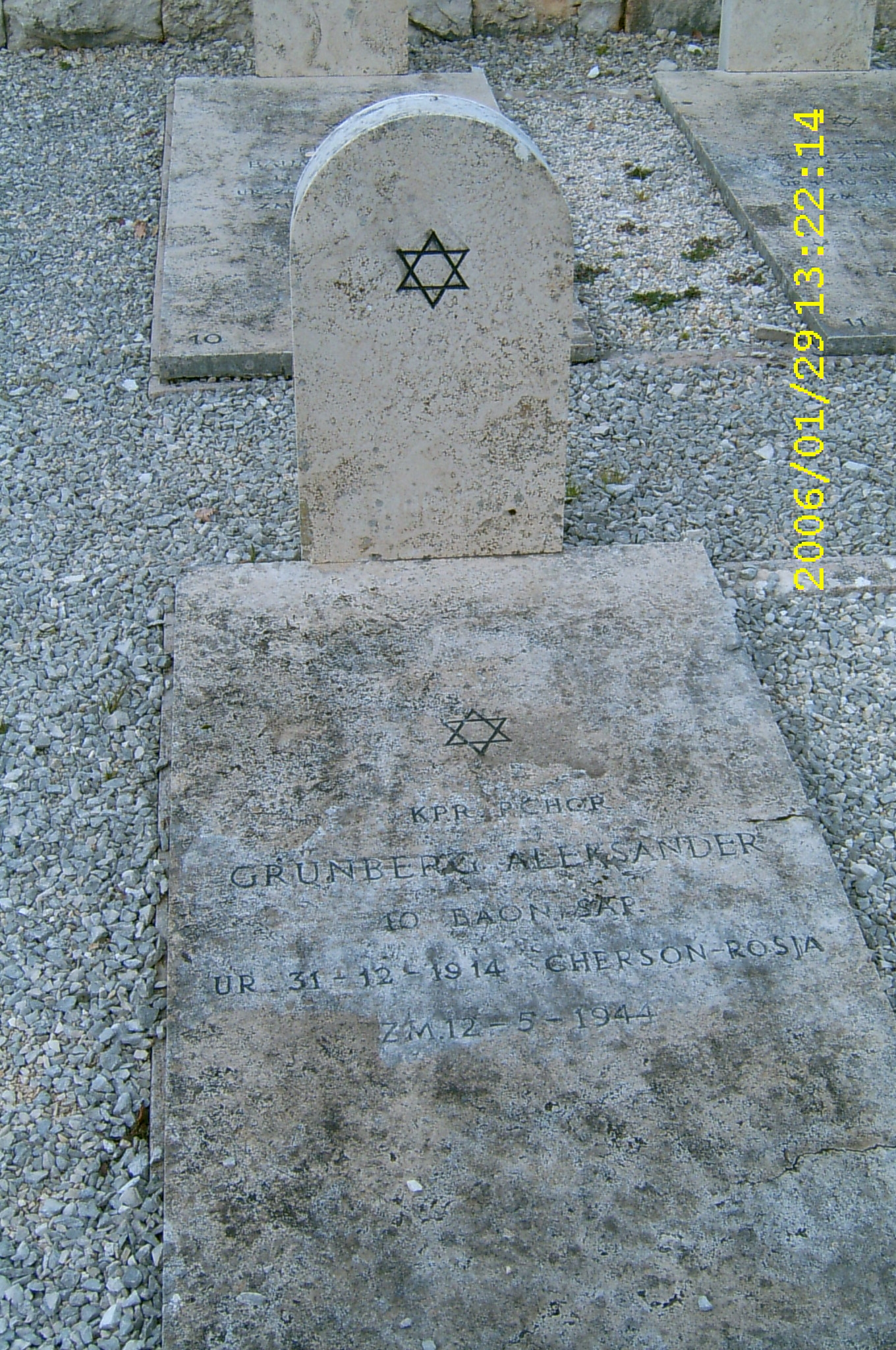
Jewish–Polish soldier's grave, Monte Cassino, Italy

There were also Jews who assisted Poles during the Soviet occupation. Among the thousands of Polish officers killed by the Soviet NKVD in the Katyń massacre there were 500–600 Jews. From 1939 to 1941 between 100,000 and 300,000 Polish Jews were deported from Soviet-occupied Polish territory into the Soviet Union. Some of them, especially Polish Communists (e.g. Jakub Berman), moved voluntarily; however, most of them were forcibly deported or imprisoned in a Gulag. Small numbers of Polish Jews (about 6,000) were able to leave the Soviet Union in 1942 with the Władysław Anders army, among them the future Prime Minister of Israel Menachem Begin. During the Polish army's II Corps' stay in the British Mandate of Palestine, 67% (2,972) of the Jewish soldiers deserted to settle in Palestine, and many joined the Irgun. General Anders decided not to prosecute the deserters and emphasized that the Jewish soldiers who remained in the Force fought bravely. The Cemetery of Polish soldiers who died during the Battle of Monte Cassino includes headstones bearing a Star of David. A number of Jewish soldiers died also when liberating Bologna.

=== The Holocaust ===
Map of the Holocaust in Poland under German occupation

Poland's Jewish community suffered the most in the Holocaust. Some six million Polish citizens perished in the war – half of those (three million Polish Jews, all but some 300,000 of the Jewish population) being killed at the German extermination camps at Auschwitz, Treblinka, Majdanek, Belzec, Sobibór, and Chełmno or starved to death in the ghettos.

Poland was where the German program of extermination of Jews, the "Final Solution", was implemented, since this was where most of Europe's Jews (excluding the Soviet Union's) lived.

In 1939 several hundred synagogues were blown up or burned by the Germans, who sometimes forced the Jews to do it themselves. In many cases, the Germans turned the synagogues into factories, places of entertainment, swimming pools, or prisons. By war's end, almost all the synagogues in Poland had been destroyed. Rabbis were forced to dance and sing in public with their beards shorn off. Some rabbis were set on fire or hanged.

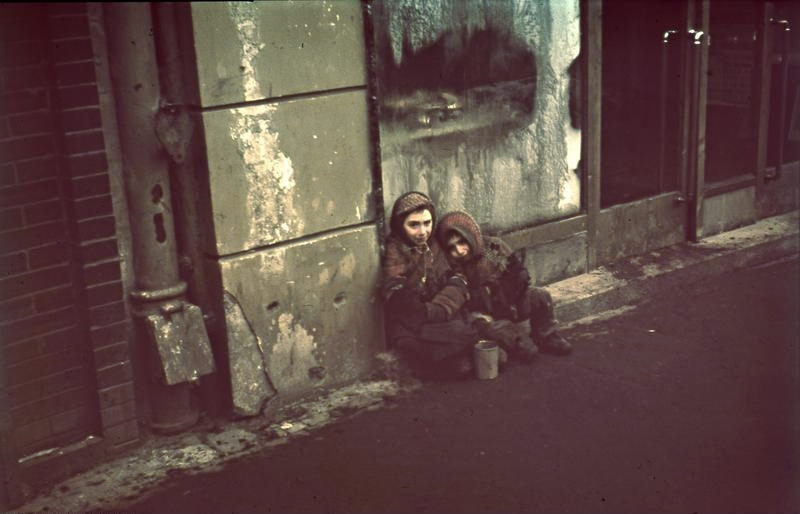
Starving Jewish children, Warsaw Ghetto

The Germans ordered that all Jews be registered, and the word "Jude" was stamped in their identity cards. Numerous restrictions and prohibitions targeting Jews were introduced and brutally enforced. For example, Jews were forbidden to walk on the sidewalks, use public transport, or enter places of leisure, sports arenas, theaters, museums and libraries. On the street, Jews had to lift their hat to passing Germans. By the end of 1941 all Jews in German-occupied Poland, except the children, had to wear an identifying badge with a blue Star of David. Rabbis were humiliated in "spectacles organised by the German soldiers and police" who used their rifle butts "to make these men dance in their praying shawls." The Germans disappointed that Poles refused to collaborate, made little attempts to set up a collaborationist government in Poland, nevertheless, German tabloids printed in Polish routinely ran antisemitic articles that urged local people to adopt an attitude of indifference towards the Jews.

Polish Government-in-Exile, The Mass Extermination of Jews in German Occupied Poland, 1942, addressed to Poland's western Allies

Following Operation Barbarossa, many Jews in what was then Eastern Poland fell victim to Nazi death squads called Einsatzgruppen, which massacred Jews, especially in 1941. Some of these German-inspired massacres were carried out with help from, or active participation of Poles themselves: for example, the Jedwabne pogrom, in which between 300 (Institute of National Remembrance's Final Findings) and 1,600 Jews (Jan T. Gross) were tortured and beaten to death by members of the local population. The full extent of Polish participation in the massacres of the Polish Jewish community remains a controversial subject, in part due to Jewish leaders' refusal to allow the remains of the Jewish victims to be exhumed and their cause of death to be properly established. The Polish Institute for National Remembrance identified twenty-two other towns that had pogroms similar to Jedwabne. The reasons for these massacres are still debated, but they included antisemitism, resentment over alleged cooperation with the Soviet invaders in the Polish–Soviet War and during the 1939 invasion of the Kresy regions, greed for the possessions of the Jews, and of course coercion by the Nazis to participate in such massacres.

Some Jewish historians have written of the negative attitudes of some Poles towards persecuted Jews during the Holocaust. While members of Catholic clergy risked their lives to assist Jews, their efforts were sometimes made in the face of antisemitic attitudes from the church hierarchy. Anti-Jewish attitudes also existed in the London-based Polish Government in Exile, although on 18 December 1942 the President in exile Władysław Raczkiewicz wrote a dramatic letter to Pope Pius XII, begging him for a public defense of both murdered Poles and Jews. In spite of the introduction of death penalty extending to the entire families of rescuers, the number of Polish Righteous among the Nations testifies to the fact that Poles were willing to take risks in order to save Jews.

Holocaust survivors' views of Polish behavior during the War span a wide range, depending on their personal experiences. Some are very negative, based on the view of Christian Poles as passive witnesses who failed to act and aid the Jews as they were being persecuted or liquidated by the Nazis. Poles, who were also victims of Nazi crimes, were often afraid for their own and their family's lives and this fear prevented many of them from giving aid and assistance, even if some of them felt sympathy for the Jews. Emanuel Ringelblum, a Polish–Jewish historian of the Warsaw Ghetto, wrote critically of the indifferent and sometimes joyful responses in Warsaw to the destruction of Polish Jews in the Ghetto. However, Gunnar S. Paulsson stated that Polish citizens of Warsaw managed to support and hide the same percentage of Jews as did the citizens of cities in Western European countries. Paulsson's research shows that at least as far as Warsaw is concerned, the number of Poles aiding Jews far outnumbered those who sold out their Jewish neighbors to the Nazis. During the Nazi occupation of Warsaw 70,000–90,000 Polish gentiles aided Jews, while 3,000–4,000 were szmalcowniks, or blackmailers who collaborated with the Nazis in persecuting the Jews.

=== Ghettos and death camps ===
The German Nazis established six extermination camps throughout occupied Poland by 1942. All of these – at Chełmno (Kulmhof), Bełżec, Sobibór, Treblinka, Majdanek and Auschwitz (Oświęcim) – were located near the rail network so that the victims could be easily transported. The system of the camps was expanded over the course of the German occupation of Poland and their purposes were diversified; some served as transit camps, some as forced labor camps and the majority as death camps. While in the death camps, the victims were usually killed shortly after arrival, in the other camps able-bodied Jews were worked and beaten to death. The operation of concentration camps depended on Kapos, the collaborator-prisoners. Some of them were Jewish themselves, and their prosecution after the war created an ethical dilemma.

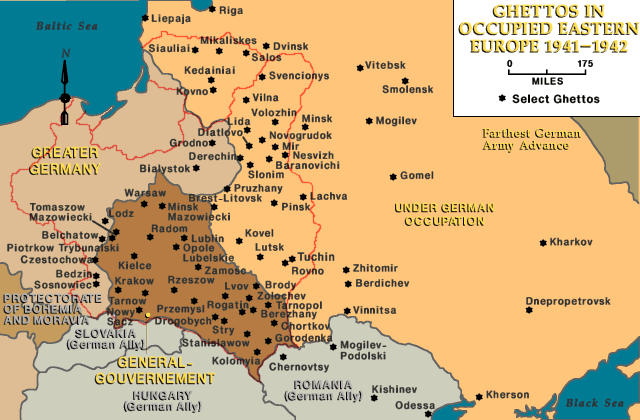
Jewish Ghettos in German-occupied Poland and Eastern Europe

Between October 1939 and July 1942 a system of ghettos was imposed for the confinement of Jews. The Warsaw Ghetto was the largest in all of World War II, with 380,000 people crammed into an area of 1.3 sq mi (3.4 km^{2}). The Łódź Ghetto was the second largest, holding about 160,000 prisoners. Other large Jewish ghettos in leading Polish cities included Białystok Ghetto in Białystok, Częstochowa Ghetto, Kielce Ghetto, Kraków Ghetto in Kraków, Lublin Ghetto, Lwów Ghetto in present-day Lviv, Stanisławów Ghetto also in present-day Ukraine, Brześć Ghetto in present-day Belarus, and Radom Ghetto among others. Ghettos were also established in hundreds of smaller settlements and villages around the country. The overcrowding, dirt, lice, lethal epidemics such as typhoid and hunger all resulted in countless deaths.

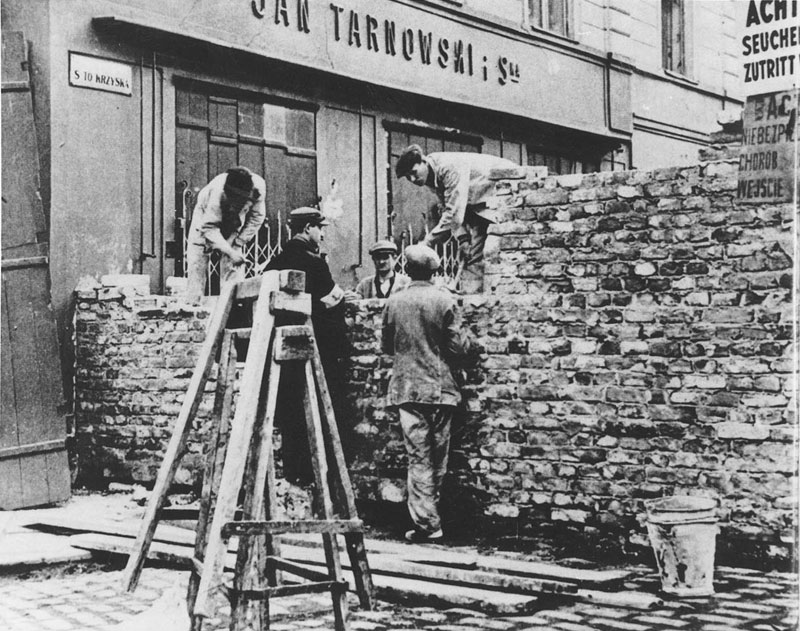
Walling-off Świętokrzyska Street (seen from Marszałkowska Street on the "Aryan" side) in Warsaw in 1940

Jews in front of the Warsaw Ghetto wall (1940–1943).

During the occupation of Poland, the Germans used various laws to separate ethnic Poles from Jewish ones. In the ghettos, the population was separated by putting the Poles into the "Aryan Side" and the Polish Jews into the "Jewish Side". Any Pole found giving any help to a Jewish Pole was subject to the death penalty. Another law implemented by the Germans was that Poles were forbidden from buying from Jewish shops, and if they did they were subject to execution. Many Jews tried to escape from the ghettos in the hope of finding a place to hide outside of it, or of joining the partisan units. When this proved difficult escapees often returned to the ghetto on their own. If caught, Germans would murder the escapees and leave their bodies in plain view as a warning to others. Despite these terror tactics, attempts at escape from ghettos continued until their liquidation.

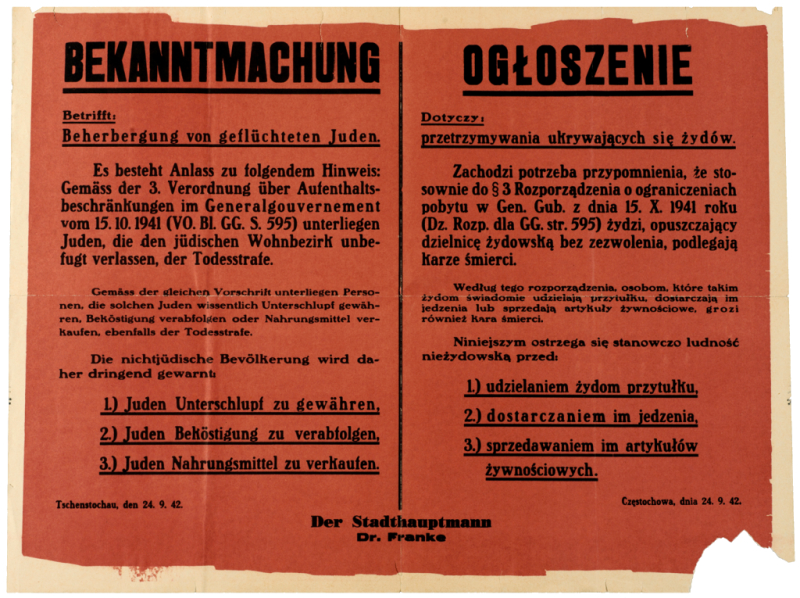
NOTICE Concerning: the Sheltering of Escaping Jews.....There is a need for a reminder, that in accordance with paragraph 3 of the decree of 15 October 1941, on the Limitation of Residence in General Government (page 595 of the GG Register) Jews leaving the Jewish Quarter without permission will incur the death penalty.....According to this decree, those knowingly helping these Jews by providing shelter, supplying food, or selling them foodstuffs are also subject to the death penalty....This is a categorical warning to the non-Jewish population against:.........1) Providing shelter to Jews,.........2) Supplying them with Food,.........3) Selling them Foodstuffs. Dr. Franke – Town Commander – Częstochowa 9/24/42

Since the Nazi terror reigned throughout the Aryan districts, the chances of remaining successfully hidden depended on a fluent knowledge of the language and on having close ties with the community. Many Poles were not willing to hide Jews who might have escaped the ghettos or who might have been in hiding due to fear for their own lives and that of their families.

While the German policy towards Jews was ruthless and criminal, their policy towards Christian Poles who helped Jews was very much the same. The Germans would often murder non-Jewish Poles for small misdemeanors. Execution for help rendered to Jews, even the most basic kinds, was automatic. In any apartment block or area where Jews were found to be harboured, everybody in the house would be immediately shot by the Germans. For this thousands of non-Jewish Poles were executed.

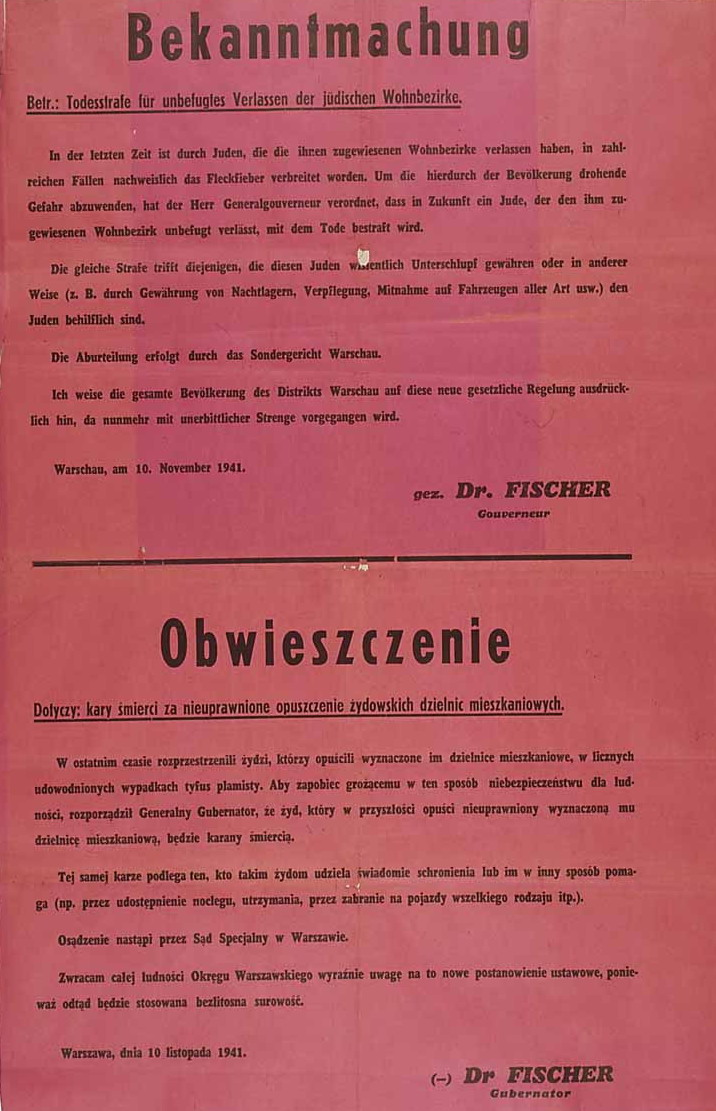
Announcement of death penalty for Jews captured outside the Ghetto and for Poles helping Jews, November 1941

Hiding in a Christian society to which the Jews were only partially assimilated was a daunting task. They needed to quickly acquire not only a new identity, but a new body of knowledge. Many Jews spoke Polish with a distinct Yiddish or Hebrew accent, used a different nonverbal language, different gestures and facial expressions. People with physical characteristics such as dark curly hair and brown eyes were particularly vulnerable.

Some individuals blackmailed Jews and non-Jewish Poles hiding them, and took advantage of their desperation by collecting money, or worse, turning them over to the Germans for a reward. The Gestapo provided a standard prize to those who informed on Jews hidden on the 'Aryan' side, consisting of cash, liquor, sugar, and cigarettes. Jews were robbed and handed over to the Germans by "szmalcowniks" (the 'shmalts' people: from shmalts or szmalec, Yiddish and Polish for 'grease'). In extreme cases, the Jews informed on other Jews to alleviate hunger with the awarded prize. The extortionists were condemned by the Polish Underground State. The fight against informers was organized by the Armia Krajowa (the Underground State's military arm), with the death sentence being meted out on a scale unknown in the occupied countries of Western Europe.

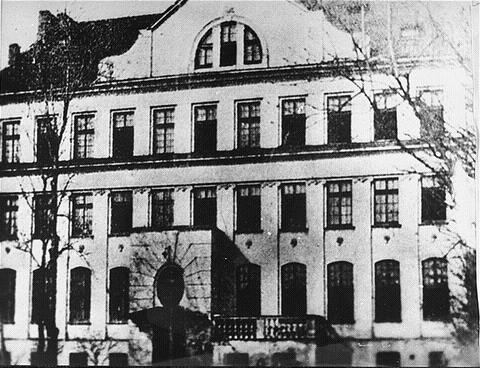
Janusz Korczak's orphanage

To discourage Poles from giving shelter to Jews, the Germans often searched houses and introduced ruthless penalties. Poland was the only occupied country during World War II where the Nazis formally imposed the death penalty for anybody found sheltering and helping Jews. The penalty applied not only to the person who did the helping, but also extended to his or her family, neighbors and sometimes to entire villages. In this way Germans applied the principle of collective responsibility whose purpose was to encourage neighbors to inform on each other in order to avoid punishment. The nature of these policies was widely known and visibly publicized by the Nazis who sought to terrorize the Polish population.

Food rations for the Poles were small (669 kcal per day in 1941) compared to other occupied nations throughout Europe and black market prices of necessary goods were high, factors which made it difficult to hide people and almost impossible to hide entire families, especially in the cities. Despite these draconian measures imposed by the Nazis, Poland has the highest number of Righteous Among The Nations awards at the Yad Vashem Museum (6,339).

The Polish Government in Exile was the first (in November 1942) to reveal the existence of Nazi-run concentration camps and the systematic extermination of the Jews by the Nazis, through its courier Jan Karski and through the activities of Witold Pilecki, a member of Armia Krajowa who was the only person to volunteer for imprisonment in Auschwitz and who organized a resistance movement inside the camp itself. One of the Jewish members of the National Council of the Polish government in exile, Szmul Zygielbojm, committed suicide to protest the indifference of the Allied governments in the face of the Holocaust in Poland. The Polish government in exile was also the only government to set up an organization (Żegota) specifically aimed at helping the Jews in Poland.

==== The Warsaw Ghetto and its uprising ====
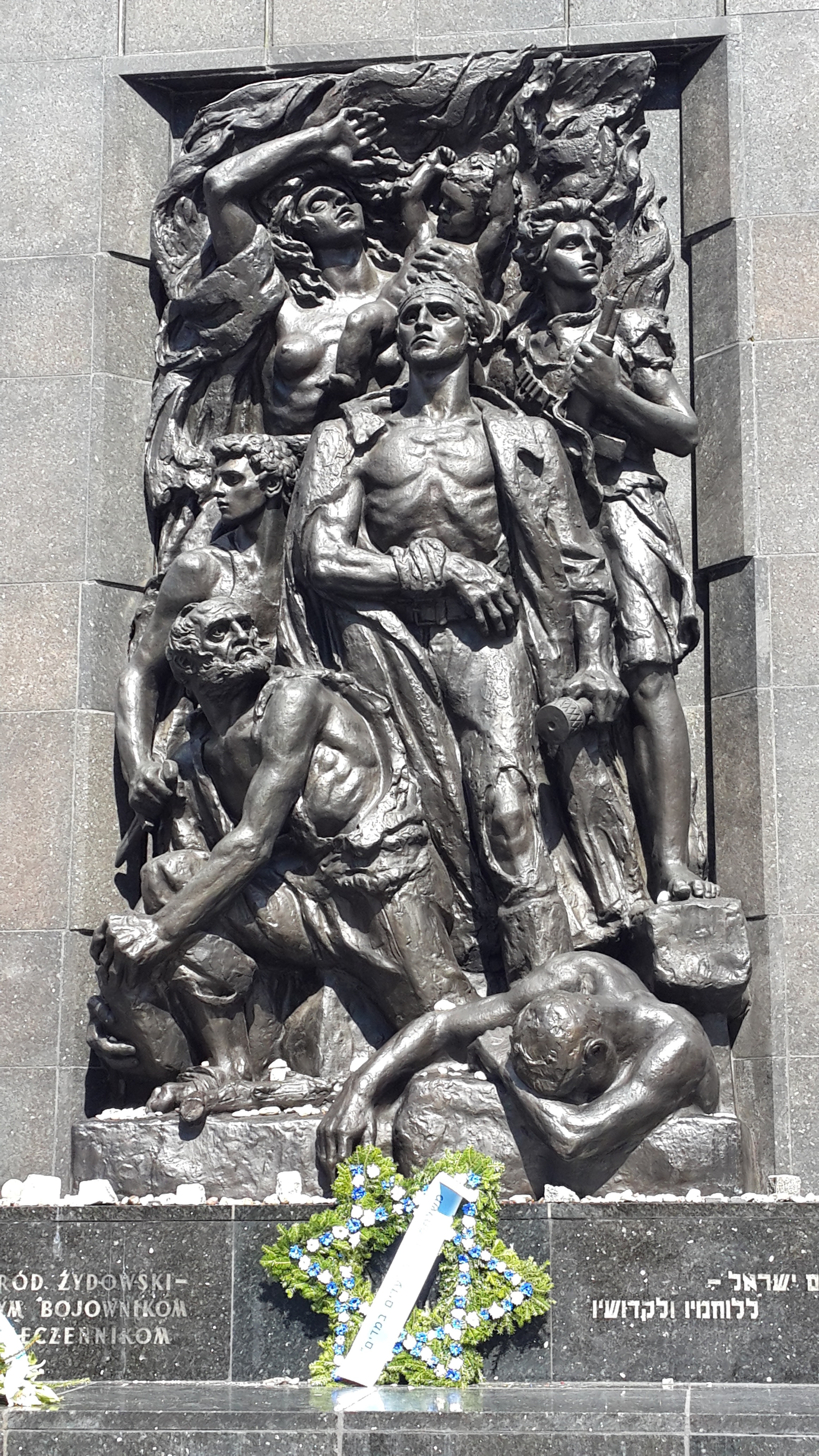
Ghetto fighters memorial in Warsaw built in 1948 by sculptor Nathan Rapoport

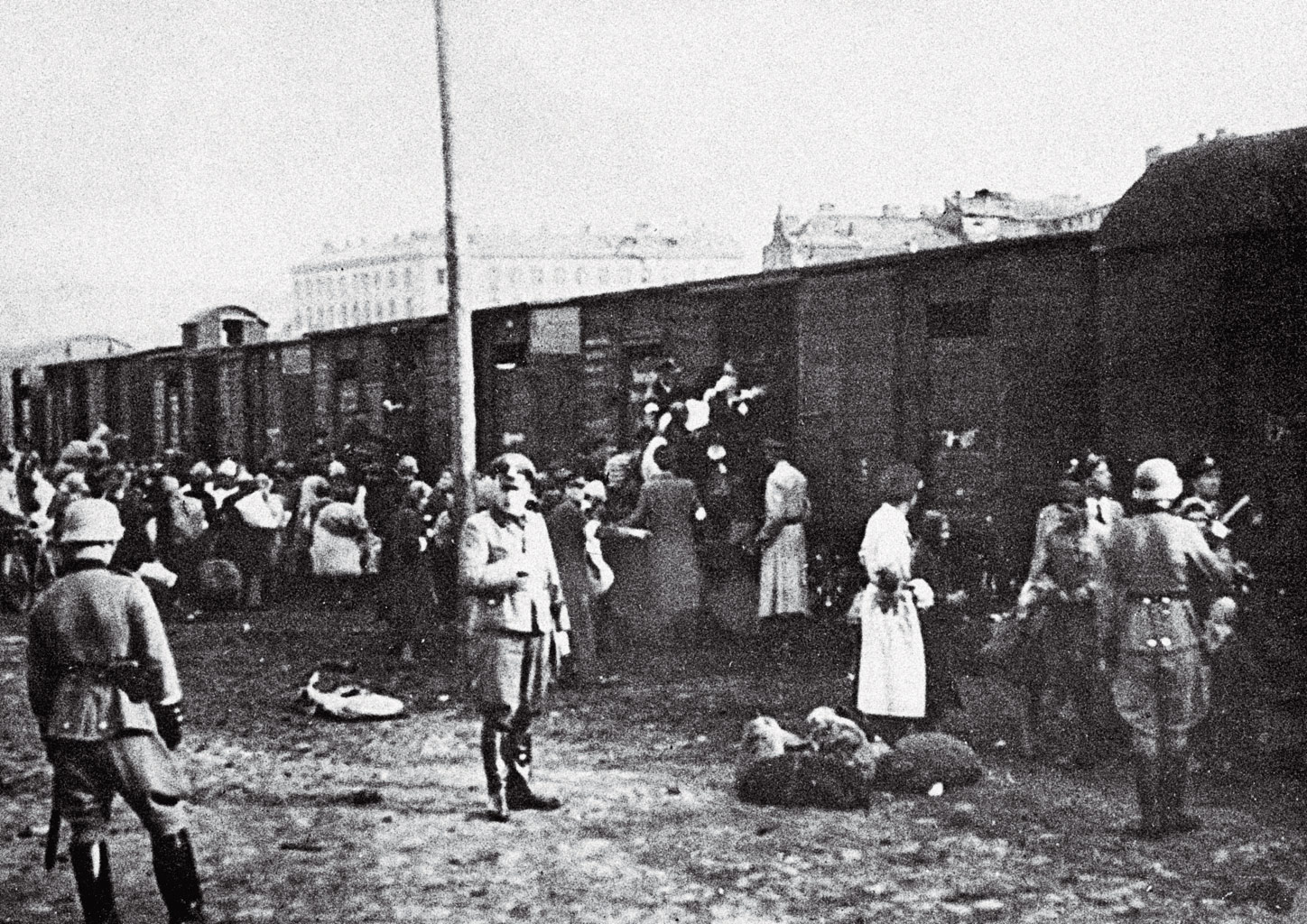
Deportation to Treblinka at the Umschlagplatz

The Warsaw Ghetto and its 1943 Uprising represents what is likely the most known episode of the wartime history of the Polish Jews. The ghetto was established by the German Governor-General Hans Frank on 16 October 1940. Initially, almost 140,000 Jews were moved into the ghetto from all parts of Warsaw. At the same time, approximately 110,000 Poles had been forcibly evicted from the area. The Germans selected Adam Czerniakow to take charge of the Jewish Council called Judenrat made up of 24 Jewish men ordered to organize Jewish labor battalions as well as Jewish Ghetto Police which would be responsible for maintaining order within the Ghetto walls. A number of Jewish policemen were corrupt and immoral. Soon the Nazis demanded even more from the Judenrat and the demands were much crueler. Death was the punishment for the slightest indication of noncompliance by the Judenrat. Sometimes the Judenrat refused to collaborate in which case its members were consequently executed and replaced by the new group of people. Adam Czerniakow who was the head of the Warsaw Judenrat committed suicide when he was forced to collect daily lists of Jews to be deported to the Treblinka extermination camp at the onset of Grossaktion Warsaw.

The population of the ghetto reached 380,000 people by the end of 1940, about 30% of the population of Warsaw. However, the size of the Ghetto was only about 2.4% of the size of the city. The Germans closed off the Ghetto from the outside world, building a wall around it by 16 November 1940. During the next year and a half, Jews from smaller cities and villages were brought into the Warsaw Ghetto, while diseases (especially typhoid) and starvation kept the inhabitants at about the same number. Average food rations in 1941 for Jews in Warsaw were limited to 253 kcal, and 669 kcal for Poles, as opposed to 2,613 kcal for Germans. On 22 July 1942, the mass deportation of the Warsaw Ghetto inhabitants began. During the next fifty-two days (until 12 September 1942) about 300,000 people were transported by freight train to the Treblinka extermination camp. The Jewish Ghetto Police were ordered to escort the ghetto inhabitants to the Umschlagplatz train station. They were spared from the deportations until September 1942 in return for their cooperation, but afterwards shared their fate with families and relatives. On 18 January 1943, a group of Ghetto militants led by the right-leaning ŻZW, including some members of the left-leaning ŻOB, rose up in a first Warsaw uprising. Both organizations resisted, with arms, German attempts for additional deportations to Auschwitz and Treblinka. The final destruction of the Warsaw Ghetto came four months later after the crushing of one of the most heroic and tragic battles of the war, the 1943 Warsaw Ghetto Uprising.

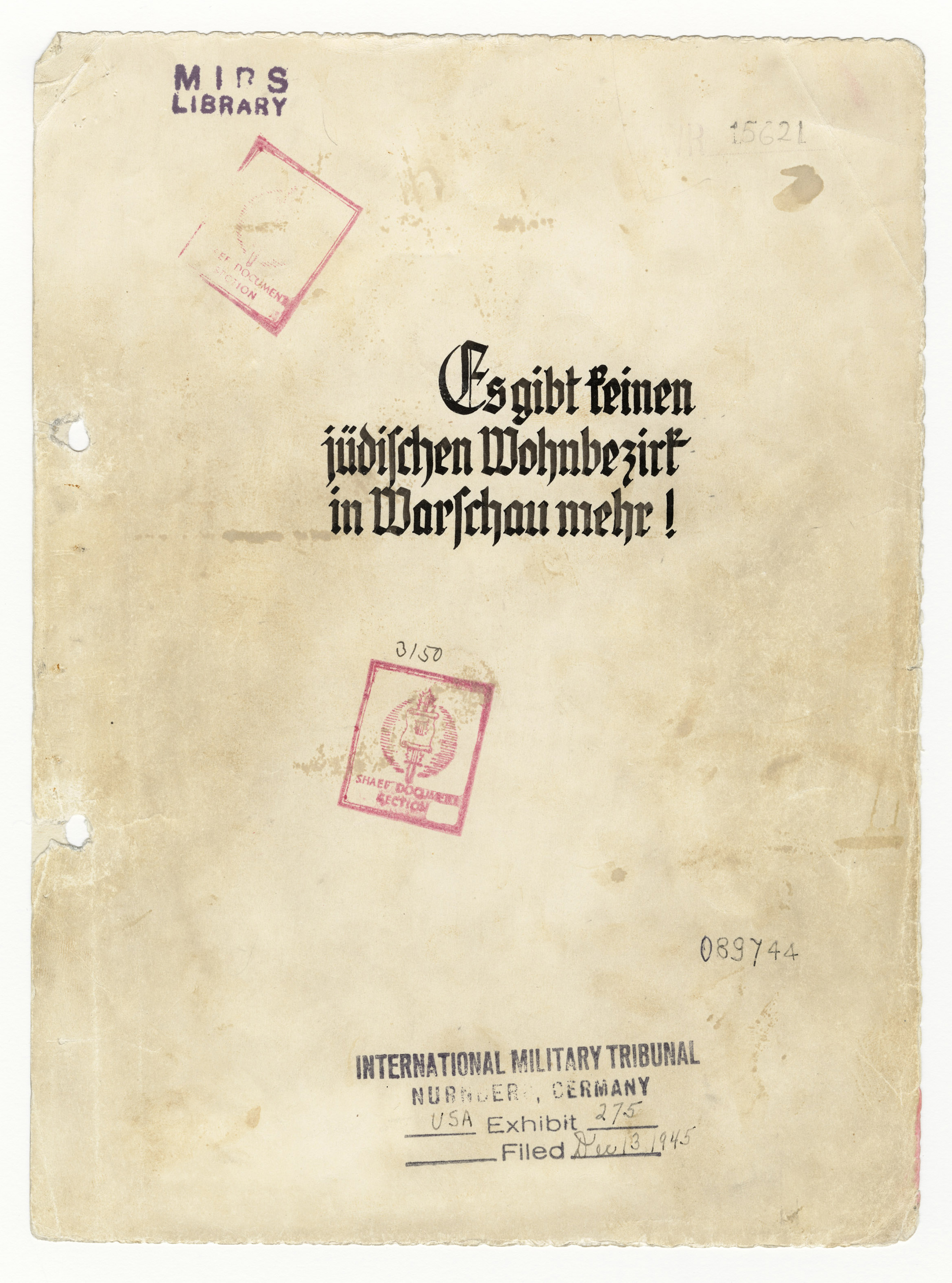
The cover page of The Stroop Report with International Military Tribunal in Nuremberg markings.

When we invaded the Ghetto for the first time – wrote SS commander Jürgen Stroop – the Jews and the Polish bandits succeeded in repelling the participating units, including tanks and armored cars, by a well-prepared concentration of fire. (...) The main Jewish battle group, mixed with Polish bandits, had already retired during the first and second day to the so-called Muranowski Square. There, it was reinforced by a considerable number of Polish bandits. Its plan was to hold the Ghetto by every means in order to prevent us from invading it. — Jürgen Stroop, Stroop Report, 1943.

The Uprising was led by ŻOB (Jewish Combat Organization) and the ŻZW. The ŻZW (Jewish Military Union) was the better supplied in arms. The ŻOB had more than 750 fighters, but lacked weapons; they had only 9 rifles, 59 pistols and several grenades. A developed network of bunkers and fortifications were formed. The Jewish fighters also received support from the Polish Underground (Armia Krajowa). The German forces, which included 2,842 Nazi soldiers and 7,000 security personnel, were not capable of crushing the Jewish resistance in open street combat and after several days, decided to switch strategy by setting buildings on fire in which the Jewish fighters hid. The commander of the ŻOB, Mordechai Anielewicz, died fighting on 8 May 1943 at the organization's command centre on 18 Mila Street.

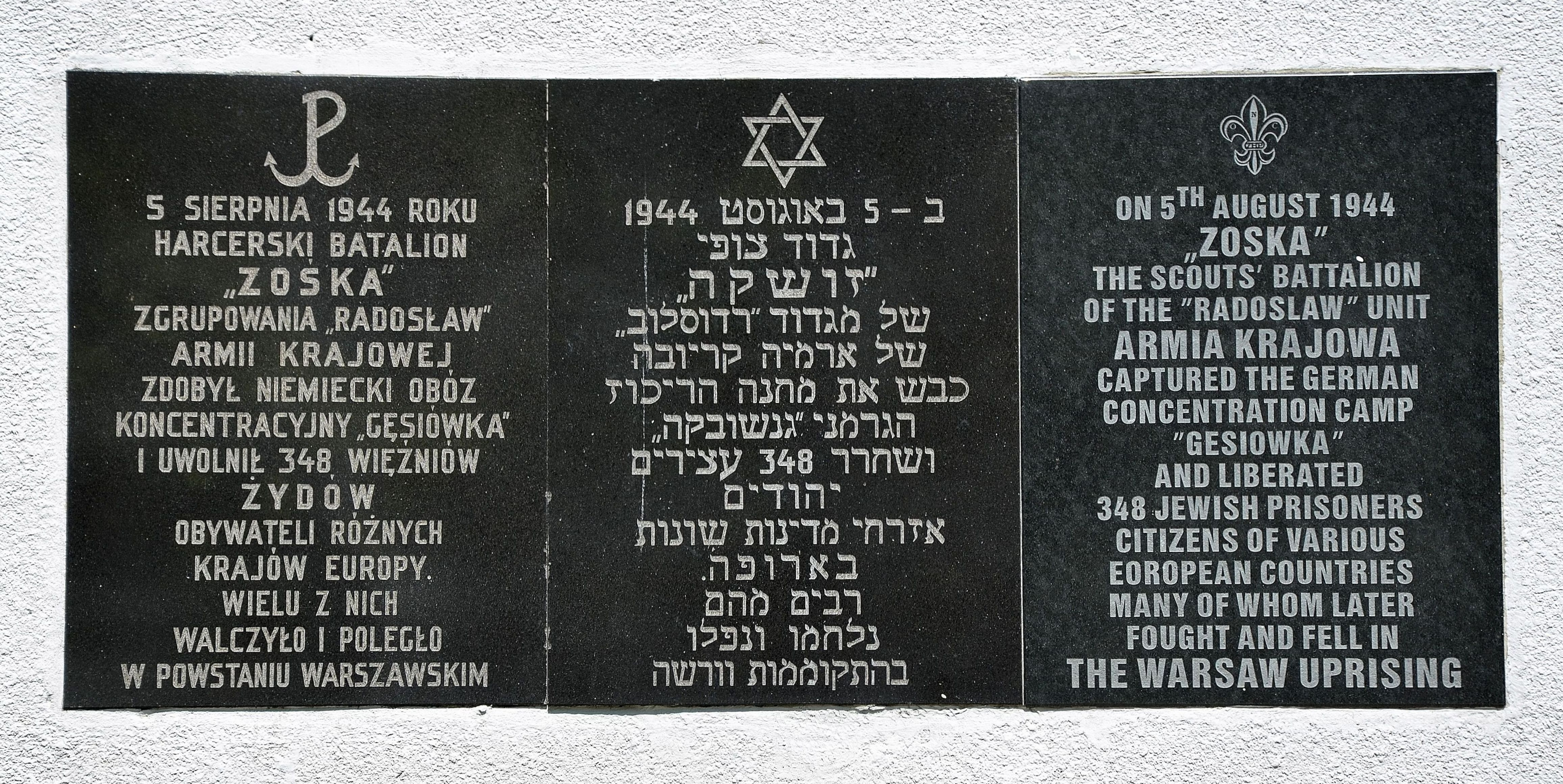
34 Mordechaj Anielewicz Street, Warsaw, Poland

It took the Germans twenty-seven days to put down the uprising, after some very heavy fighting. The German general Jürgen Stroop in his report stated that his troops had killed 6,065 Jewish fighters during the battle. After the uprising was already over, Heinrich Himmler had the Great Synagogue on Tłomackie Square (outside the ghetto) destroyed as a celebration of German victory and a symbol that the Jewish Ghetto in Warsaw was no longer.

A group of fighters escaped from the ghetto through the sewers and reached the Lomianki forest. About 50 ghetto fighters were saved by the Polish "People's Guard" and later formed their own partisan group, named after Anielewicz. Even after the end of the uprising there were still several hundreds of Jews who continued living in the ruined ghetto. Many of them survived thanks to the contacts they managed to establish with Poles outside the ghetto. The Uprising inspired Jews throughout Poland. Many Jewish leaders who survived the liquidation continued underground work outside the ghetto. They hid other Jews, forged necessary documents and were active in the Polish underground in other parts of Warsaw and the surrounding area.

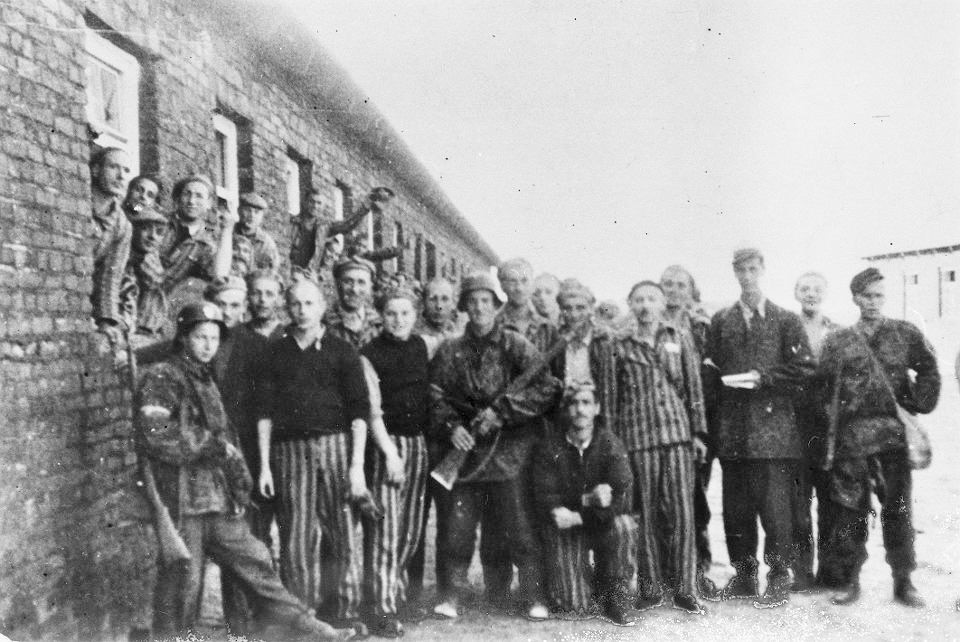
Freed prisoners of Gęsiówka and the Szare Szeregi fighters after the liberation of the camp in August 1944

Warsaw Ghetto Uprising, was followed by other Ghetto uprisings in many smaller towns and cities across German-occupied Poland. Many Jews were found alive in the ruins of the former Warsaw Ghetto during the 1944 general Warsaw Uprising when the Poles themselves rose up against the Germans. Some of the survivors of 1943 Warsaw Ghetto Uprising, still held in camps at or near Warsaw, were freed during 1944 Warsaw Uprising, led by the Polish resistance movement Armia Krajowa, and immediately joined Polish fighters. Only a few of them survived. The Polish commander of one Jewish unit, Waclaw Micuta, described them as some of the best fighters, always at the front line. It is estimated that over 2,000 Polish Jews, some as well known as Marek Edelman or Icchak Cukierman, and several dozen Greek, Hungarian or even German Jews freed by Armia Krajowa from Gesiowka concentration camp in Warsaw, men and women, took part in combat against Nazis during 1944 Warsaw Uprising. Some 166,000 people lost their lives in the 1944 Warsaw Uprising, including perhaps as many as 17,000 Polish Jews who had either fought with the AK or had been discovered in hiding (see: Krzysztof Kamil Baczyński and Stanisław Aronson). Warsaw was razed to the ground by the Germans and more than 150,000 Poles were sent to labor or concentration camps. On 17 January 1945, the Soviet Army entered a destroyed and nearly uninhabited Warsaw. Some 300 Jews were found hiding in the ruins in the Polish part of the city (see: Władysław Szpilman).

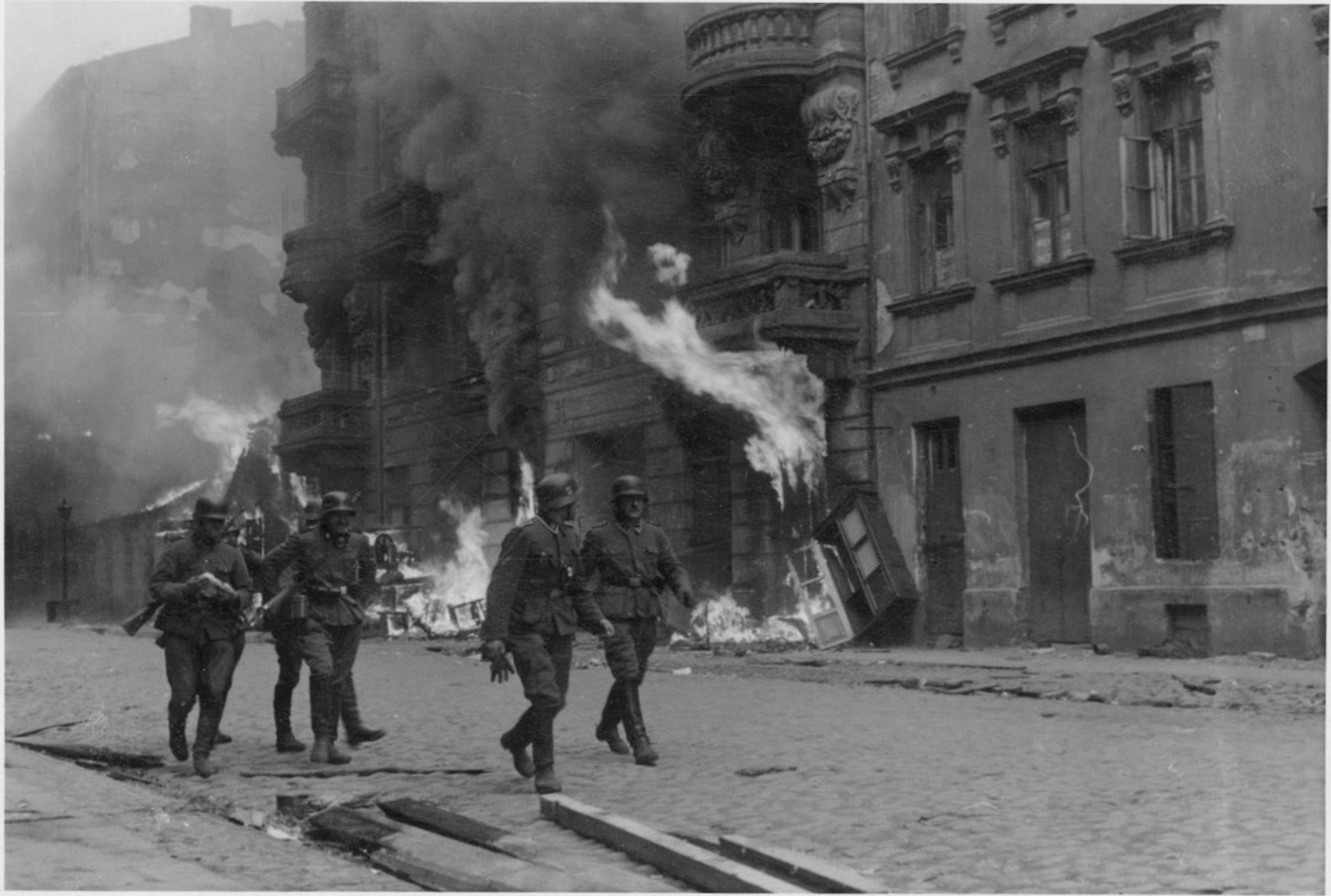
The Warsaw Ghetto Uprising of 1943 saw the destruction of what remained of the Ghetto

The fate of the Warsaw Ghetto was similar to that of the other ghettos in which Jews were concentrated. With the decision of Nazi Germany to begin the Final Solution, the destruction of the Jews of Europe, Aktion Reinhard began in 1942, with the opening of the extermination camps of Bełżec, Sobibór, and Treblinka, followed by Auschwitz-Birkenau where people were killed in gas chambers and mass executions (death wall). Many died from hunger, starvation, disease, torture or by pseudo-medical experiments. The mass deportation of Jews from ghettos to these camps, such as happened at the Warsaw Ghetto, soon followed, and more than 1.7 million Jews were killed at the Aktion Reinhard camps by October 1943 alone.

==== The Białystok Ghetto and its uprising ====
In August 1941, the Germans ordered the establishment of a ghetto in Białystok. About 50,000 Jews from the city and the surrounding region were confined in a small area of Białystok. The ghetto had two sections, divided by the Biala River. Most Jews in the Białystok ghetto worked in forced-labor projects, primarily in large textile factories located within the ghetto boundaries. The Germans also sometimes used Jews in forced-labor projects outside the ghetto.

In February 1943, approximately 10,000 Białystok Jews were deported to the Treblinka extermination camp. During the deportations, hundreds of Jews, mainly those deemed too weak or sick to travel, were killed.

In August 1943, the Germans mounted an operation to destroy the Białystok ghetto. German forces and local police auxiliaries surrounded the ghetto and began to round up Jews systematically for deportation to the Treblinka extermination camp. Approximately 7,600 Jews were held in a central transit camp in the city before deportation to Treblinka. Those deemed fit to work were sent to the Majdanek camp. In Majdanek, after another screening for ability to work, they were transported to the Poniatowa, Blizyn, or Auschwitz camps. Those deemed too weak to work were murdered at Majdanek. More than 1,000 Jewish children were sent first to the Theresienstadt ghetto in Bohemia, and then to Auschwitz-Birkenau, where they were killed.

On 15 August 1943, the Białystok Ghetto Uprising began, and several hundred Polish Jews and members of the Anti-Fascist Military Organisation (Polish: Antyfaszystowska Organizacja Bojowa) started an armed struggle against the German troops who were carrying out the planned liquidation and deportation of the ghetto to the Treblinka extermination camp. The guerrillas were armed with only one machine gun, several dozen pistols, Molotov cocktails and bottles filled with acid. The fighting in isolated pockets of resistance lasted for several days, but the defence was broken almost instantly. As with the earlier Warsaw Ghetto Uprising of April 1943, the Białystok uprising had no chances for military success, but it was the second-largest ghetto uprising, after the Warsaw Ghetto Uprising. Several dozen guerrillas managed to break through to the forests surrounding Białystok where they joined the partisan units of Armia Krajowa and other organisations and survived the war.

== Communist rule: 1945–1989 ==
=== Number of Holocaust survivors ===
The estimates of Polish Jews before the war vary from slightly under 3 million to almost 3.5 million (the last nationwide census was conducted in 1931).

The number of Polish Jews who survived the Holocaust is difficult to ascertain. The majority of Polish Jewish survivors were individuals who were able to find refuge in the territories of Soviet Union that were not overrun by Germans and thus safe from the Holocaust. It is estimated that between 250,000 and 800,000 Polish Jews survived the war, out of which between 50,000 and 100,000 were survivors from occupied Poland, and the remainder, survivors who made it abroad (mostly to the Soviet Union).

Following the Soviet annexation of over half of Poland at the onset of World War II, all Polish nationals including Jews were declared by Moscow to have become Soviet nationals regardless of birth. Also, all Polish Jews who perished in the Holocaust east of the Curzon Line were included with the Soviet war dead. For decades to come, the Soviet authorities refused to accept the fact that thousands of Jews who remained in the USSR opted consciously and unambiguously for Polish nationality. At the end of 1944, the number of Polish Jews in the Soviet and the Soviet-controlled territories has been estimated at 250,000–300,000 people. Jews who escaped to eastern Poland from areas occupied by Germany in 1939 were numbering at around 198,000. Over 150,000 of them were repatriated or expelled back to new communist Poland along with the Jewish men conscripted to the Red Army from Kresy in 1940–1941. Their families were murdered in the Holocaust. Some of the soldiers married women with the Soviet citizenship, others agreed to paper marriages. Those who survived the Holocaust in Poland included Jews who were saved by the Poles (most families with children), and those who joined the Polish or Soviet resistance movement. Some 20,000–40,000 Jews were repatriated from Germany and other countries. At its postwar peak, up to 240,000 returning Jews might have resided in Poland mostly in Warsaw, Łódź, Kraków, Wrocław and Lower Silesia, e.g., Dzierżoniów (where there was a significant Jewish community initially consisting of local concentration camp survivors), Legnica, and Bielawa.

=== The Jewish community in post-war Poland ===
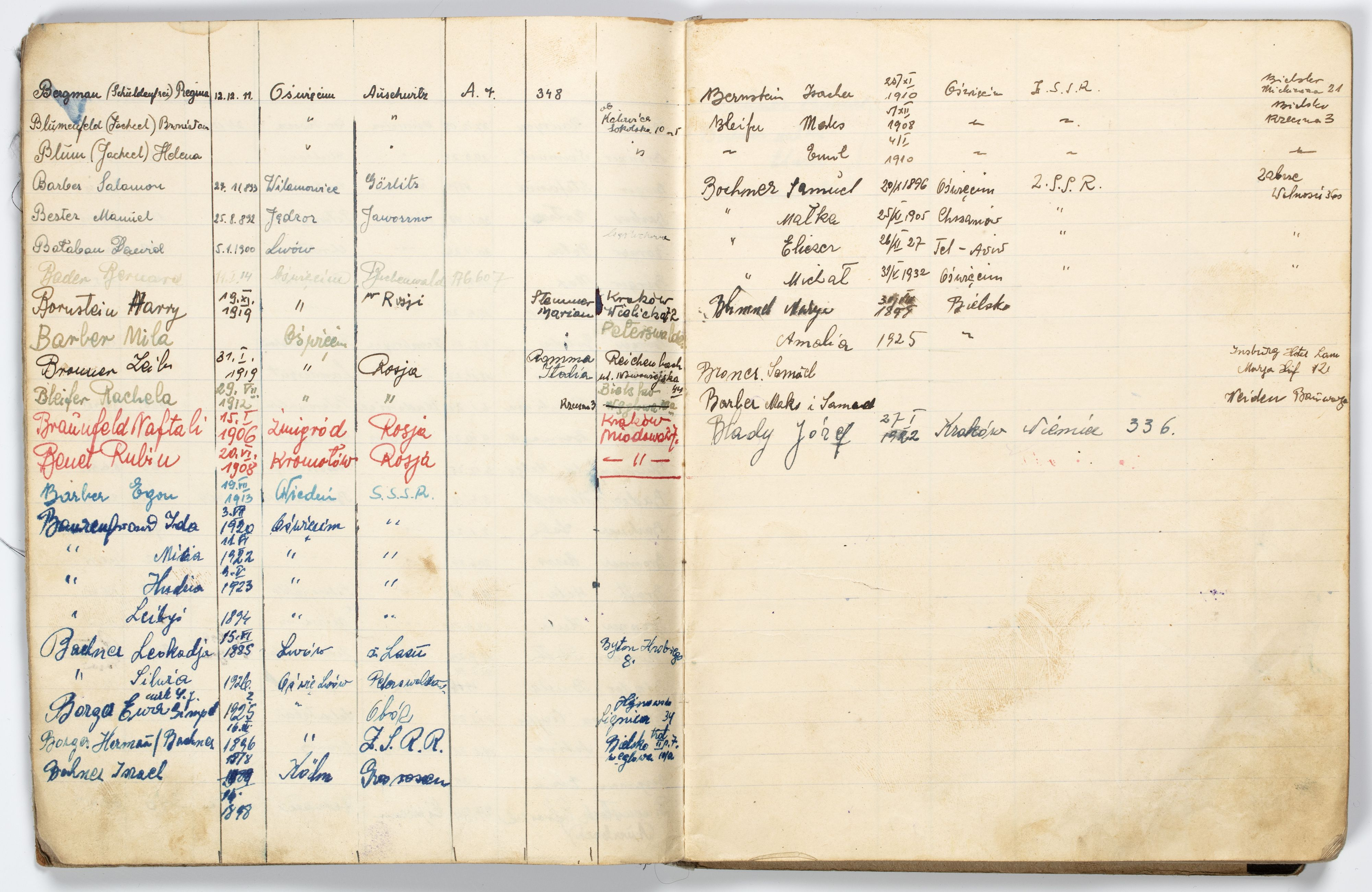
Page from a register of several hundred Jewish survivors who returned to Oświęcim after the war; created by a local Jewish Committee in 1945. Most remained for only a brief period.

Following World War II Poland became a satellite state of the Soviet Union, with its eastern regions annexed to the Union, and its western borders expanded to include formerly German territories east of the Oder and Neisse rivers. This forced millions to relocate (see also Territorial changes of Poland immediately after World War II). Jewish survivors returning to their homes in Poland found it practically impossible to reconstruct their pre-war lives. Due to the border shifts, some Polish Jews found that their homes were now in the Soviet Union; in other cases, the returning survivors were German Jews whose homes were now under Polish jurisdiction. Jewish communities and Jewish life as it had existed was gone, and Jews who somehow survived the Holocaust often discovered that their homes had been looted or destroyed.

==== Anti-Jewish violence and discrimination ====
Some returning Jews were met with antisemitic bias in Polish employment and education administrations. Post-war labor certificates contained markings distinguishing Jews from non-Jews. The Jewish community in Szczecin reported a lengthy report of complaints regarding job discrimination. Although Jewish schools were created in the few towns containing a relatively large Jewish population, many Jewish children were enrolled in Polish state schools. Some state schools, as in the town of Otwock, forbade Jewish children to enroll. In the state schools that did allow Jewish children, there were numerous accounts of beatings and persecution targeting these children.

The anti-Jewish violence in Poland refers to a series of violent incidents in Poland that immediately followed the end of World War II in Europe. It occurred amid a period of violence and anarchy across the country, caused by lawlessness and anti-communist resistance against the Soviet-backed communist takeover of Poland. The exact number of Jewish victims is a subject of debate with 327 documented cases, and range, estimated by different writers, from 400 to 2,000. Jews constituted between 2 and 3% of the total number of victims of postwar violence in the country, including the Polish Jews who managed to escape the Holocaust on territories of Poland annexed by the Soviet Union, and returned after the border changes imposed by the Allies at the Yalta Conference. The incidents ranged from individual attacks to pogroms.

The best-known case is the Kielce pogrom of 4 July 1946, in which thirty-seven Jews and two Poles were murdered. Following the investigation, the local police commander was found guilty of inaction. Nine alleged participants of the pogrom were sentenced to death; three were given lengthy prison sentences. The debate in Poland continues about the involvement of regular troops in the killings, and possible Soviet influences.

In a number of other instances, returning Jews still met with threats, violence, and murder from their Polish neighbors, occasionally in a deliberate and organized manner. People of the community frequently had knowledge of these murders and turned a blind eye or held no sympathy for the victims. Jewish communities responded to this violence by reporting the violence to the Ministry of Public Administration, but were granted little assistance. As many as 1500 Jewish heirs were often murdered when attempting to reclaim property.

Several causes led to the anti-Jewish violence of 1944–1947. One cause was traditional Christian anti-semitism; the pogrom in Kraków (11 August 1945) and in Kielce followed accusations of ritual murder. Another cause was the gentile Polish hostility to the Communist takeover. Even though very few Jews lived in postwar Poland, many Poles believed they dominated the Communist authorities, a belief expressed in the term Żydokomuna (Judeo-Communist), a popular anti-Jewish stereotype. Yet another reason for Polish violence towards Jews stemmed from the fear that survivors would recover their property.

==== Jewish property ====
After the war ended, Poland's Communist government enacted a broad program of nationalization and land reform, taking over large numbers of properties, both Polish- and Jewish-owned. As part of the reform the Polish People's Republic enacted legislation on "abandoned property", placing severe limitations on inheritance that were not present in prewar inheritance law, for example limiting restitution to the original owners or their immediate heirs. According to Dariusz Stola, the 1945 and 1946 laws governing restitution were enacted with the intention of restricting Jewish restitution claims as one of their main goals. The 1946 law carried a deadline of 31 December 1947 (later extended to 31 December 1948), after which unclaimed property devolved to the Polish state; many survivors residing in the USSR or in displaced-persons camps were repatriated only after the deadline had passed. All other properties that had been confiscated by the Nazi regime were deemed "abandoned"; however, as Yechiel Weizman notes, the fact most of Poland's Jewry had died, in conjunction with the fact that only Jewish property was officially confiscated by the Nazis, suggest "abandoned property" was equivalent to "Jewish property". According to Łukasz Krzyżanowski, the state actively sought to gain control over a large number of "abandoned" properties. According to Krzyżanowski, this declaration of "abandoned" property can be seen as the last stage of the expropriation process that began during the German wartime occupation; by approving the status-quo shaped by the German occupation authorities, the Polish authorities became "the beneficiary of the murder of millions of its Jewish citizens, who were deprived of all their property before death". A 1945 memorandum by the Joint states that "the new economic tendency of the Polish government... is against, or at least makes difficulties in, getting back the Jewish property robbed by the German authorities." Later laws, while more generous, remained mainly on paper, with an "uneven" implementation.

Many of the properties that were previously owned or by Jews were taken over by others during the war. Attempting to reclaim an occupied property often put the claimant at a risk of physical harm and even death. Many who proceeded with the process were only granted possession, not ownership, of their properties; and completing the restitution process, given that most properties were already occupied, required additional, lengthy processes. The majority of Jewish claimants could not afford the restitution process without financial help, due to the filing costs, legal fees, and inheritance tax. While it is hard to determine the total number of successful reclamations, Michael Meng estimates that it was extremely small.

In general, restitution was easier for larger organizations or well connected individuals, and the process was also abused by criminal gangs.

"Movable" property such as housewares, that was either given by Jews for safekeeping or taken during the war, was rarely returned willfully; oftentimes the only resort for a returnee looking for reappropriation was the courts. Most such property was probably never returned. According to Jan Gross, "there was no social norm mandating the return of Jewish property, no detectable social pressure defining such behavior as the right thing to do, no informal social control mechanism imposing censure for doing otherwise."

Facing violence and a difficult and expensive legal process, many returnees eventually decided to leave the country rather than attempt reclamation.

Following the fall of the Soviet Union, a law was passed that allowed the Catholic Church to reclaim its properties, which it did with great success. According to Stephen Denburg, "unlike the restitution of Church property, the idea of returning property to former Jewish owners has been met with a decided lack of enthusiasm from both the general Polish population as well as the government".

Decades later, reclaiming pre-war property would lead to a number of controversies, and the matter is still debated by media and scholars as of late 2010s. Dariusz Stola notes that the issues of property in Poland are incredibly complex, and need to take into consideration unprecedented losses of both Jewish and Polish population and massive destruction caused by Nazi Germany, as well as the expansion of Soviet Union and communism into Polish territories after the war, which dictated the property laws for the next 50 years. Poland remains "the only EU country and the only former Eastern European communist state not to have enacted [a restitution] law," but rather "a patchwork of laws and court decisions promulgated from 1945–present." As stated by Dariusz Stola, director of the POLIN Museum, "the question of restitution is in many ways connected to the question of Polish–Jewish relations, their history and remembrance, but particularly to the attitude of the Poles to the Holocaust."

==== Emigration to Palestine and Israel ====
For a variety of reasons, the vast majority of returning Jewish survivors left Poland soon after the war ended. Many left for the West because they did not want to live under a Communist regime. Some left because of the persecution they faced in postwar Poland, and because they did not want to live where their family members had been murdered, and instead have arranged to live with relatives or friends in different western democracies. Others wanted to go to British Mandate of Palestine soon to be the new state of Israel, especially after General Marian Spychalski signed a decree allowing Jews to leave Poland without visas or exit permits. In 1946–1947 Poland was the only Eastern Bloc country to allow free Jewish aliyah to Israel, without visas or exit permits. Britain demanded Poland to halt the exodus, but their pressure was largely unsuccessful.

Between 1945 and 1948, 100,000–120,000 Jews left Poland. Their departure was largely organized by the Zionist activists including Adolf Berman and Icchak Cukierman, under the umbrella of a semi-clandestine Berihah ("Flight") organization. Berihah was also responsible for the organized Aliyah emigration of Jews from Romania, Hungary, Czechoslovakia, Yugoslavia, and Poland, totaling 250,000 survivors. In 1947, a military training camp for young Jewish volunteers to Hagana was established in Bolków, Poland. The camp trained 7,000 soldiers who then traveled to Palestine to fight for Israel. The boot-camp existed until the end of 1948.

A second wave of Jewish emigration (50,000) took place during the liberalization of the Communist regime between 1957 and 1959. After 1967's Six-Day War, in which the Soviet Union supported the Arab side, the Polish communist party adopted an anti-Jewish course of action which in the years 1968–1969 provoked the last mass migration of Jews from Poland.

The Bund took part in the post-war elections of 1947 on a common ticket with the (non-communist) Polish Socialist Party (PPS) and gained its first and only parliamentary seat in its Polish history, plus several seats in municipal councils. Under pressure from Soviet-installed communist authorities, the Bund's leaders 'voluntarily' disbanded the party in 1948–1949 against the opposition of many activists. Stalinist Poland was basically governed by the Soviet NKVD which was against the renewal of Jewish religious and cultural life. In the years 1948–49, all remaining Jewish schools were nationalized by the communists and Yiddish was replaced with Polish as a language of teaching.

==== Rebuilding Jewish communities ====
For those Polish Jews who remained, the rebuilding of Jewish life in Poland was carried out between October 1944 and 1950 by the Central Committee of Polish Jews (Centralny Komitet Żydów Polskich, CKŻP) which provided legal, educational, social care, cultural, and propaganda services. A countrywide Jewish Religious Community, led by Dawid Kahane, who served as chief rabbi of the Polish Armed Forces, functioned between 1945 and 1948 until it was absorbed by the CKŻP. Eleven independent political Jewish parties, of which eight were legal, existed until their dissolution during 1949–50. Hospitals and schools were opened in Poland by the American Jewish Joint Distribution Committee and ORT to provide service to Jewish communities. Some Jewish cultural institutions were established including the Yiddish State Theater founded in 1950 and directed by Ida Kamińska, the Jewish Historical Institute, an academic institution specializing in the research of the history and culture of the Jews in Poland, and the Yiddish newspaper Folks-Shtime ("People's Voice"). Following liberalization after Joseph Stalin's death, in this 1958–59 period, 50,000 Jews emigrated to Israel.

Some Polish Communists of Jewish descent actively participated in the establishment of the communist regime in the People's Republic of Poland between 1944 and 1956. Hand-picked by Joseph Stalin, prominent Jews held posts in the Politburo of the Polish United Workers' Party including Jakub Berman, head of state security apparatus Urząd Bezpieczeństwa (UB), and Hilary Minc responsible for establishing a Communist-style economy. Together with hardliner Bolesław Bierut, Berman and Minc formed a triumvirate of the Stalinist leaders in postwar Poland. After 1956, during the process of de-Stalinisation in the People's Republic under Władysław Gomułka, some Jewish officials from Urząd Bezpieczeństwa including Roman Romkowski, Jacek Różański, and Anatol Fejgin, were prosecuted and sentenced to prison terms for "power abuses" including the torture of Polish anti-fascists including Witold Pilecki among others. Yet another Jewish official, Józef Światło, after escaping to the West in 1953, exposed through Radio Free Europe the interrogation methods used the UB which led to its restructuring in 1954. Solomon Morel a member of the Ministry of Public Security of Poland and commandant of the Stalinist era Zgoda labour camp, fled Poland for Israel in 1992 to escape prosecution. Helena Wolińska-Brus, a former Stalinist prosecutor who emigrated to England in the late 1960s, fought being extradited to Poland on charges related to the execution of a Second World War resistance hero Emil Fieldorf. Wolińska-Brus died in London in 2008.

==== The March 1968 events and their aftermath ====
In 1967, following the Six-Day War between Israel and the Arab states, Poland's Communist government, following the Soviet lead, broke off diplomatic relations with Israel and launched an antisemitic campaign under the guise of "anti-Zionism". However, the campaign did not resonate well with the Polish public, as most Poles saw similarities between Israel's fight for survival and Poland's past struggles for independence. Many Poles also felt pride in the success of the Israeli military, which was dominated by Polish Jews. The slogan "our Jews beat the Soviet Arabs" (Nasi Żydzi pobili sowieckich Arabów) became popular in Poland.

The vast majority of the 40,000 Jews in Poland by the late 1960s were completely assimilated into the broader society. However, this did not prevent them from becoming victims of a campaign, centrally organized by the Polish Communist Party, with Soviet backing, which equated Jewish origins with "Zionism" and disloyalty to a Socialist Poland.

In March 1968 student-led demonstrations in Warsaw (see Polish 1968 political crisis) gave Gomułka's government an excuse to try and channel public anti-government sentiment into another avenue. Thus his security chief, Mieczysław Moczar, used the situation as a pretext to launch an antisemitic press campaign (although the expression "Zionist" was officially used). The state-sponsored "anti-Zionist" campaign resulted in the removal of Jews from the Polish United Workers' Party and from teaching positions in schools and universities. In 1967–1971 under economic, political and secret police pressure, over 14,000 Polish Jews chose to leave Poland and relinquish their Polish citizenship. Officially, it was said that they chose to go to Israel. However, only about 4,000 actually went there; most settled throughout Europe and in the United States. The leaders of the Communist party tried to stifle the ongoing protests and unrest by scapegoating the Jews. At the same time there was an ongoing power struggle within the party itself and the antisemitic campaign was used by one faction against another. The so-called "Partisan" faction blamed the Jews who had held office during the Stalinist period for the excesses that had occurred, but the result was that most of the remaining Polish Jews, regardless of their background or political affiliation, were targeted by the communist authorities.

There were several outcomes of the March 1968 events. The campaign damaged Poland's reputation abroad, particularly in the U.S. Many Polish intellectuals, however, were disgusted at the promotion of official antisemitism and opposed the campaign. Some of the people who emigrated to the West at this time founded organizations that encouraged anti-Communist opposition inside Poland.

First attempts to improve Polish–Israeli relations began in the mid-1970s. Poland was the first of the Eastern Bloc countries to restore diplomatic relations with Israel after these have been broken off right after the Six-Day's War. In 1986 partial diplomatic relations with Israel were restored, and full relations were restored in 1990 as soon as communism fell.

During the late 1970s some Jewish activists were engaged in the anti-Communist opposition groups. Most prominent among them, Adam Michnik (founder of Gazeta Wyborcza) was one of the founders of the Workers' Defence Committee (KOR). By the time of the fall of Communism in Poland in 1989, only 5,000–10,000 Jews remained in the country, many of them preferring to conceal their Jewish origin.

== Since 1989 ==
With the fall of communism in Poland, Jewish cultural, social, and religious life has been undergoing a revival. Many historical issues, especially related to World War II and the 1944–89 period, suppressed by Communist censorship, have been re-evaluated and publicly discussed (like the Jedwabne pogrom, the Koniuchy massacre, the Kielce pogrom, the Auschwitz cross, and Polish-Jewish wartime relations in general).

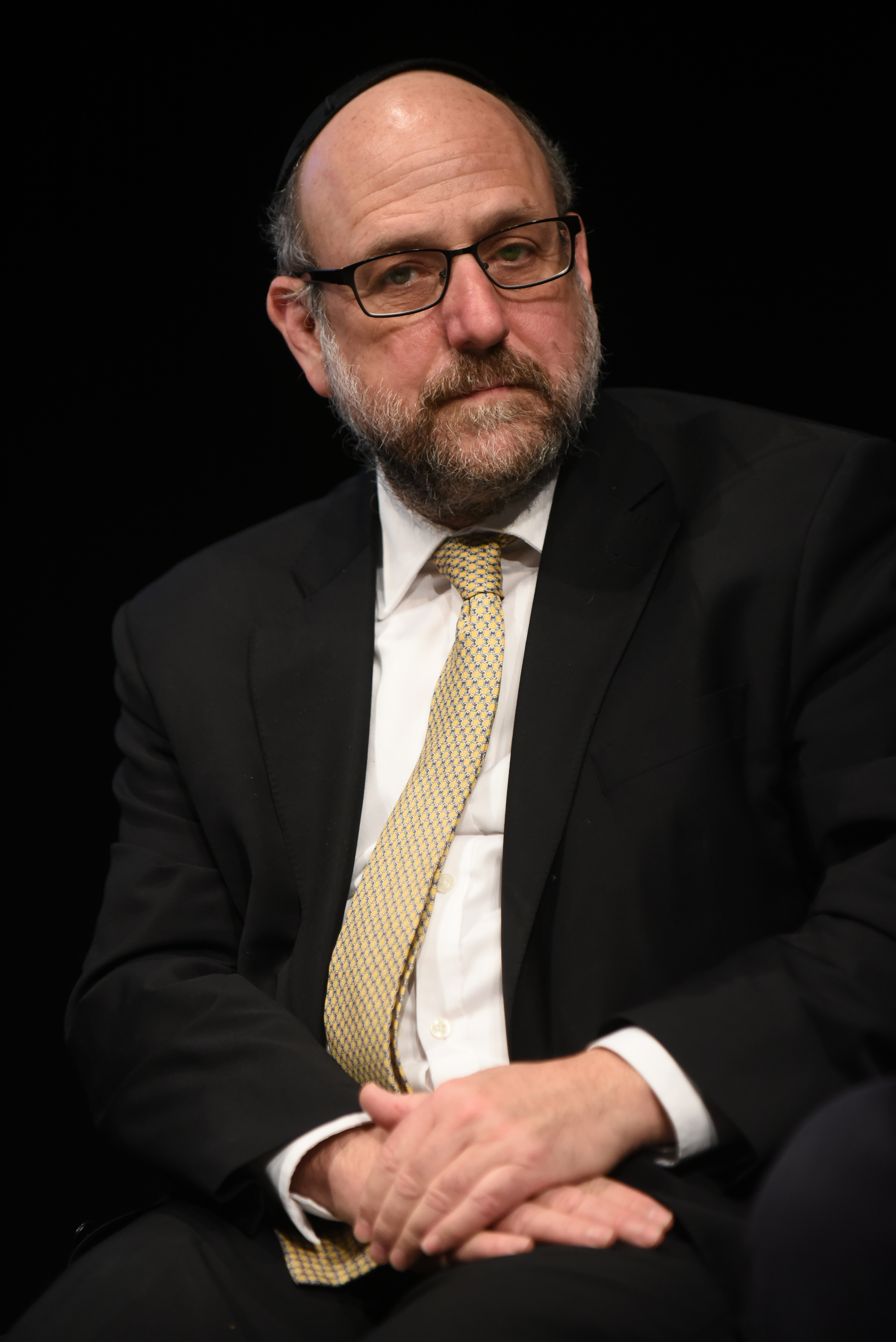
Chief Rabbi of Poland – Michael Schudrich

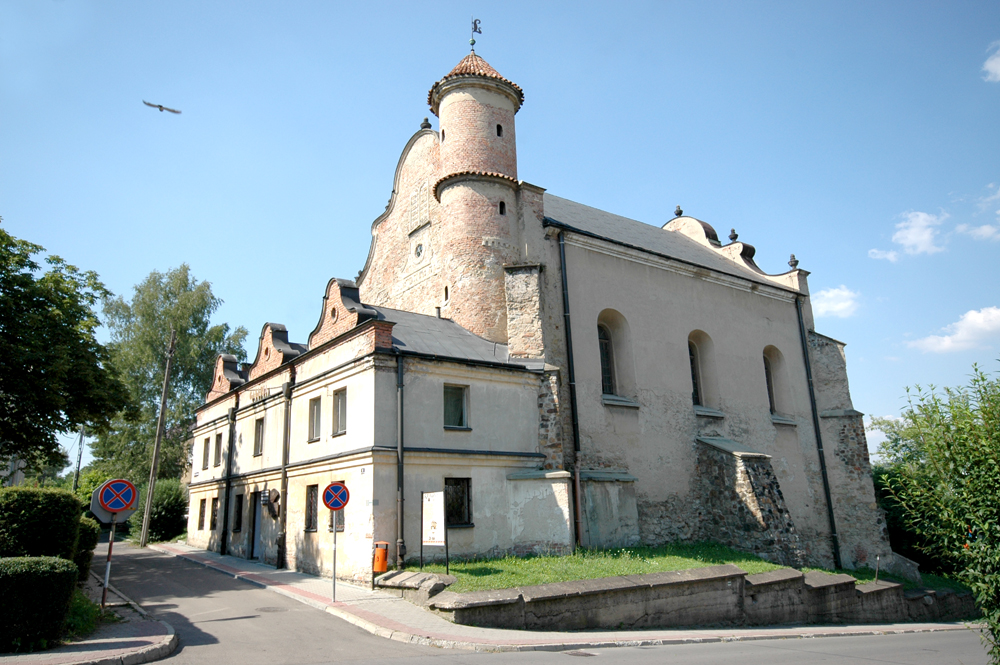
Lesko Synagogue, Poland

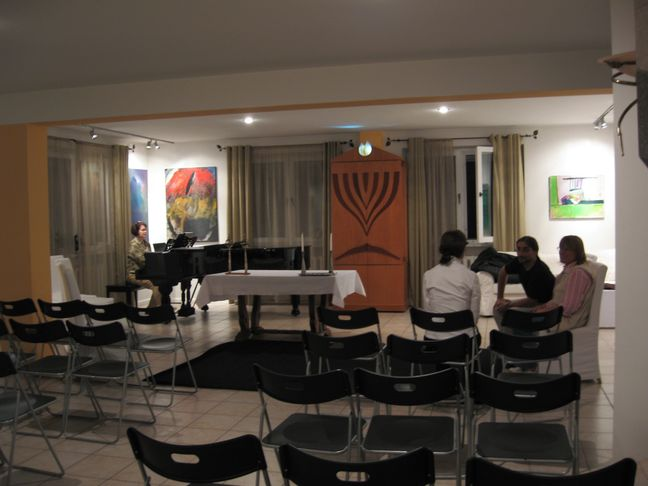
Reform Beit Warszawa Synagogue

Jewish religious life has been revived with the help of the Ronald Lauder Foundation and the Taube Foundation for Jewish Life & Culture. There are two rabbis serving the Polish Jewish community, several Jewish schools and associated summer camps as well as several periodical and book series sponsored by the above foundations. Jewish studies programs are offered at major universities, such as Warsaw University and the Jagiellonian University. The Union of Jewish Religious Communities in Poland was founded in 1993. Its purpose is the promotion and organization of Jewish religious and cultural activities in Polish communities.

A large number of cities with synagogues include Warsaw, Kraków, Zamość, Tykocin, Rzeszów, Kielce, or Góra Kalwaria although not many of them are still active in their original religious role. Stara Synagoga ("Old Synagogue") in Kraków, which hosts a Jewish museum, was built in the early 15th century and is the oldest synagogue in Poland. Before the war, the Yeshiva Chachmei in Lublin was Europe's largest. In 2007 it was renovated, dedicated and reopened thanks to the efforts and endowments by Polish Jewry. Warsaw has an active synagogue, Beit Warszawa, affiliated with the Liberal-Progressive stream of Judaism.

There are also several Jewish publications although most of them are in Polish. These include Midrasz, Dos Jidische Wort (which is bilingual), as well as a youth journal Jidele and "Sztendlach" for young children. Active institutions include the Jewish Historical Institute, the E.R. Kaminska State Yiddish Theater in Warsaw, and the Jewish Cultural Center. The Judaica Foundation in Kraków has sponsored a wide range of cultural and educational programs on Jewish themes for a predominantly Polish audience. With funds from the city of Warsaw and the Polish government ($26 million total) a Museum of the History of Polish Jews is being built in Warsaw. The building was designed by the Finnish architect Rainer Mahlamäki.

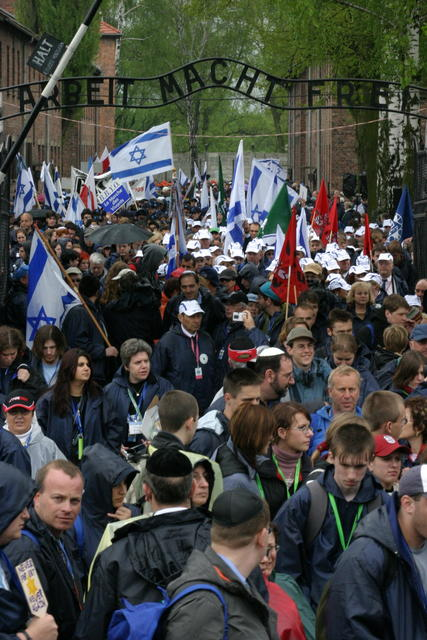
2005 March of the Living

Former extermination camps of Auschwitz-Birkenau, Majdanek and Treblinka are open to visitors. At Auschwitz the Oświęcim State Museum currently houses exhibitions on Nazi crimes with a special section (Block Number 27) specifically focused on Jewish victims and martyrs. At Treblinka there is a monument built out of many shards of broken stone, as well as a mausoleum dedicated to those who perished there. A small mound of human ashes commemorates the 350,000 victims of the Majdanek camp who were killed there by the Nazis. Jewish Cemetery, Łódź is one of the largest Jewish burial grounds in Europe, and preserved historic sites include those located in Góra Kalwaria and Leżajsk (Elimelech's of Lizhensk ohel).

The Great Synagogue in Oświęcim was excavated after testimony by a Holocaust survivor suggested that many Jewish relics and ritual objects had been buried there, just before Nazis took over the town. Candelabras, chandeliers, a menorah and a ner tamid were found and can now be seen at the Auschwitz Jewish Center.

The Warsaw Ghetto Memorial was unveiled on 19 April 1948—the fifth anniversary of the outbreak of the Warsaw ghetto Uprising. It was constructed out of bronze and granite that the Nazis used for a monument honoring German victory over Poland and it was designed by Nathan Rapoport. The Memorial is located where the Warsaw Ghetto used to be, at the site of one command bunker of the Jewish Combat Organization.

A memorial to the victims of the Kielce Pogrom of 1946, where a mob murdered more than 40 Jews who returned to the city after the Holocaust, was unveiled in 2006. The funds for the memorial came from the city itself and from the U.S. Commission for the Preservation of America's Heritage Abroad.

Polish authors and scholars have published many works about the history of Jews in Poland. Notable among them are the Polish Academy of Sciences's Holocaust studies journal Zagłada Żydów. Studia i Materiały as well as other publications from the Institute of National Remembrance. Recent scholarship has primarily focused on three topics: post-war anti-Semitism; emigration and the creation of the State of Israel, and the restitution of property.

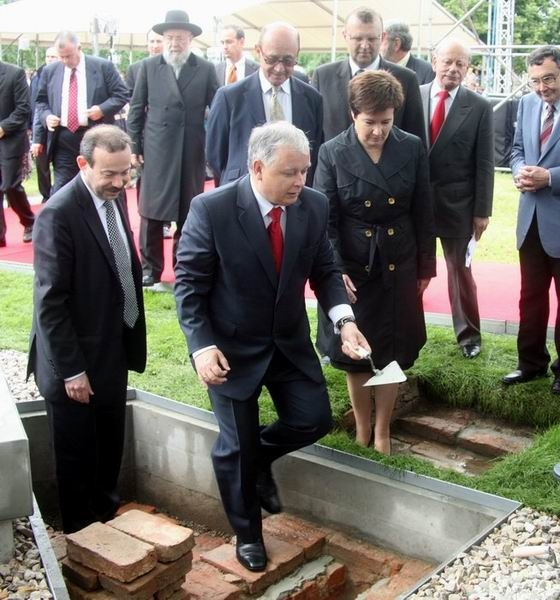
President of the Republic of Poland, Lech Kaczyński, at the groundbreaking ceremony for the Museum of the History of Polish Jews, 26 June 2007

There have been a number of Holocaust remembrance activities in Poland in recent years. The United States Department of State documents that:

In September 2000, dignitaries from Poland, Israel, the United States, and other countries (including Prince Hassan of Jordan) gathered in the city of Oświęcim (Auschwitz) to commemorate the opening of the refurbished Chevra Lomdei Mishnayot synagogue and the Auschwitz Jewish Center. The synagogue, the sole synagogue in Oświęcim to survive World War II and an adjacent Jewish cultural and educational center, provide visitors a place to pray and to learn about the active pre-World War II Jewish community that existed in Oświęcim. The synagogue was the first communal property in the country to be returned to the Jewish community under the 1997 law allowing for restitution of Jewish communal property.

The March of the Living is an annual event in April held since 1988 to commemorate the victims of the Holocaust. It takes place from Auschwitz to Birkenau and is attended by many people from Israel, Poland and other countries. The marchers honor Holocaust Remembrance Day as well as Israel Independence Day.

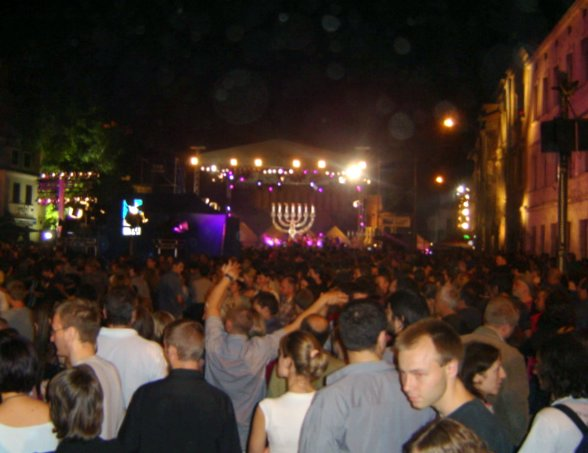
"Shalom in Szeroka Street", the final concert of the 15th Jewish Festival

An annual festival of Jewish culture, which is one of the biggest festivals of Jewish culture in the world, takes place in Kraków.

In 2006, Poland's Jewish population was estimated to be approximately 20,000; most living in Warsaw, Wrocław, Kraków, and Bielsko-Biała, though there are no census figures that would give an exact number. According to the Polish Moses Schorr Centre and other Polish sources, however, this may represent an undercount of the actual number of Jews living in Poland, since many are not religious. There are also people with Jewish roots who do not possess adequate documentation to confirm it, due to various historical and family complications.

Poland is currently easing the way for Jews who left Poland during the Communist organized massive expulsion of 1968 to re-obtain their citizenship. Some 15,000 Polish Jews were deprived of their citizenship in the 1968 Polish political crisis. On 17 June 2009 the future Museum of the History of Polish Jews in Warsaw launched a bilingual Polish-English website called "The Virtual Shtetl", providing information about Jewish life in Poland.

In 2013, POLIN Museum of the History of Polish Jews opened. It is one of the world's largest Jewish museums. As of 2019 another museum, the Warsaw Ghetto Museum, is under construction and is intended to open in 2023.

== Numbers of Jews in Poland since 1920 ==
Historical core Jewish population (using current borders) with Jews as a % of the total Polish population (Source: YIVO Encyclopedia & the North American Jewish Data Bank)
Year	1921	1939	1945	1946	1951	1960	1970	1980	1990	2000	2010
Population	2,845,000 (+14.2%)	3,250,000 (100%); 9.1% of the total	100,000 (−96.9%); 0.4%	230,000 (+130.0%); 1.0%	70,000 (−69.6%); 0.3%	31,000 (−55.7%); 0.1%	9,000 (−71.0%) <0.1%	5,000 (−44.4%) nil%	3,800 (−24.0%) nil%	3,500 (−7.9%) nil%	3,200 (−8.6%) nil%

However, most sources other than YIVO give a larger number of Jews living in contemporary Poland. In the 2011 Polish census, 7,508 Polish citizens declared their nationality as "Jewish", a big increase from just 1,133 during the previous 2002 census. In the 2021 Polish census in total 17,156 people declared their ethnicity as Jewish, once again a big increase from the previous census. The voivodeships with the largest number of Jews are Masovian, Lesser Poland and Silesian. There are likely more people of Jewish ancestry living in Poland but who do not actively identify as Jewish. According to the Moses Schorr Centre, there are 100,000 Jews living in Poland who don't actively practice Judaism and do not list "Jewish" as their nationality. The Jewish Renewal in Poland organization estimates that there are 200,000 "potential Jews" in Poland. The American Jewish Joint Distribution Committee and Jewish Agency for Israel estimate that there are between 25,000 and 100,000 Jews living in Poland, a similar number to that estimated by Jonathan Ornstein, head of the Jewish Community Center in Kraków (between 20,000 and 100,000).

Jewish population of Poland according to the 2021 census
Voivodeship	Total population	Jewish population	Percentage of Jews
Masovian	5,514,699	5,224	0.1%
Lesser Poland	3,432,295	1,693	0.1%
Silesian	4,402,950	1,611	nil%
Lower Silesian	2,904,894	1,482	0.1%
Greater Poland	3,504,579	1,173	nil%
Pomeranian	2,357,320	1,086	0.1%
Łódź	2,410,286	976	nil%
Lublin	2,052,340	707	nil%
West Pomeranian	1,657,716	594	nil%
Kuyavian-Pomeranian	2,027,261	514	nil%
Subcarpathian	2,093,360	513	nil%
Warmian-Masurian	1,382,232	371	nil%
Podlaskie	1,154,283	365	nil%
Opole	954,133	310	nil%
Holy Cross	1,196,557	272	nil%
Lubusz	991,213	265	nil%
Poland	38,036,118	17,156	0.1%

== See also ==
- History of the Jews in Poland before the 18th century
- History of the Jews in 18th-century Poland
- History of the Jews in 19th-century Poland
- History of the Jews in 20th-century Poland
- Timeline of Jewish-Polish history
- Galician Jews
- Golden age of Jewish culture in Spain
- History of the Jews in Austria
- History of the Jews in Germany
- History of the Jews in Russia
- Israel–Poland relations
- Jewish ethnic divisions
- Jewish Roots in Poland
- List of Polish rabbis

== Bibliography ==
- Marek Jan Chodakiewicz, After the Holocaust, East European Monographs, 2003, ISBN 0-88033-511-4.
- Marek Jan Chodakiewicz, Between Nazis and Soviets: Occupation Politics in Poland, 1939–1947, Lexington Books, 2004, ISBN 0-7391-0484-5.
- William W. Hagen, "Before the 'Final Solution': Toward a Comparative Analysis of Political Anti-Semitism in Interwar Germany and Poland", The Journal of Modern History, Vol. 68, No. 2 (Jun. 1996), 351–381.
- Hundert, Gershon David (2004). Jews in Poland–Lithuania in the Eighteenth Century: A Genealogy of Modernity. Berkeley: University of California Press. ISBN 0-520-23844-3.
- Polish Ministry of Foreign Affairs (2014) [1942]. Rohde, Aleksandra Miesak (ed.). German Occupation of Poland. Washington, D.C.: Dale Street Books. ISBN 978-1941656105.
- Antony Polonsky and Joanna B. Michlic. The Neighbors Respond: The Controversy over the Jedwabne Massacre in Poland, Princeton University Press, 2003 ISBN 0-691-11306-8. (The introduction is online)
- Iwo Cyprian Pogonowski, Jews in Poland. A Documentary History, Hippocrene Books, Inc., 1998, ISBN 0-7818-0604-6.
- David Vital, A People Apart: A Political History of the Jews in Europe 1789–1939, Oxford University Press, 2001.
- M. J. Rosman, The Lord's Jews: Magnate-Jewish Relations in the Polish–Lithuanian Commonwealth During the Eighteenth Century, Harvard University Press, 1990, ISBN 0-916458-18-0
- Edward Fram, Ideals Face Reality: Jewish Life and Culture in Poland 1550–1655, HUC Press, 1996, ISBN 0-8143-2906-3
- Magda Teter, Jews and Heretics in Premodern Poland: A Beleaguered Church in the Post-Reformation Era, Cambridge University Press, 2006, ISBN 0-521-85673-6
- Laurence Weinbaum, The De-Assimilation of the Jewish Remnant in Poland, in: Ethnos-Nation: eine europäische Zeitschrift, 1999, pp. 8–25
- New York: Funk and Wagnalls. Considerable amount of copy-pasted paragraphs lacking inline citations originate from the Chapter: "Russia" in this source. The encyclopedia was published when sovereign Poland did not exist following the century of Partitions by neighbouring empires. OCLC 632370258.
