= Samuel Abraham Poznański =

Polish-Jewish scholar

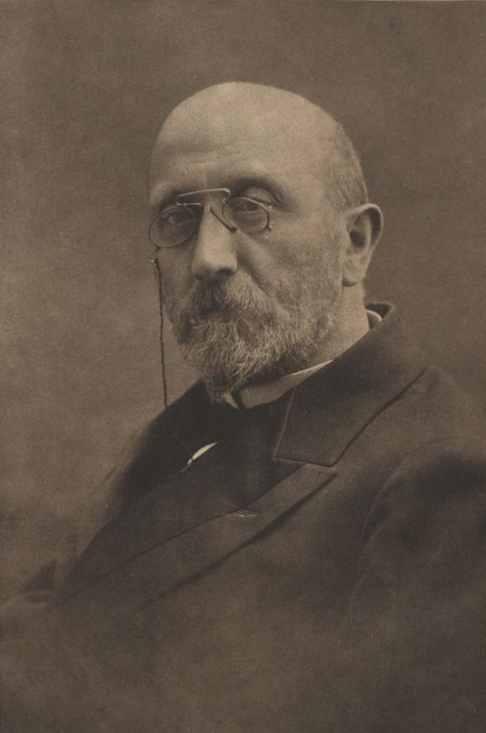
Samuel Abraham Poznański

Samuel Abraham Poznański or Shemuel Avraham Poznanski (Hebrew: שמואל אברהם פוזננסקי; 3 September 1864 – 1921) was a Polish-Jewish scholar, known for his studies of Karaism and the Hebrew calendar. Arabist, Hebrew bibliographer, and authority on modern Karaism; rabbi and preacher at the Great Synagogue in Warsaw.

He was born in Lubraniec. He graduated from a gymnasium of Warsaw and studied at Warsaw University and the Hochschule für die Wissenschaft des Judentums in Berlin. At that time he formed an intimate friendship with his teacher Moritz Steinschneider, for whose eightieth birthday in 1896 he edited the Festschrift.

He was appointed a member of the Warsaw council of rabbis by a committee of the Great Synagogue on Tłomackie Street, Warsaw just before his death where he preached. Orthodox Jews opposed his appointment and even resorted to street demonstrations. He was succeeded at the Great Synagogue by Moses Schorr in 1923.

He was an ardent Zionist, and a delegate to the First Zionist Congress.

== Writings ==
Poznanski is the author of the following works:

- "Eine Hebräische Grammatik des Dreizehnten Jahr-hunderts" (Berlin, 1894);
- "Mose b. Samuel ha-Kohen ibn Chiquitilla Nebst den Fragmenten Seiner Schriften" (Leipsic, 1895);
- "Isak b. Elasar ha-Levis Einleitung zu Seinem Sephath Jether" (Breslau, 1895);
- "Aboul Faradj Haroun ben al-Faradj le Grammairien de Jürusalem et Son Mouschtamil" (Paris, 1896);
- "Die Girgisani-Handschriften im British Museum" (Berlin, 1896);
- "Karaite Miscellanies" (London, 1896);
- "Mesroi al Okbari, Chef d'une Secte Juive du Neuvième Siècle" (Paris, 1896);
- "The Anti-Karaite Writings of Saadjah Gaon" (London, 1897);
- "Jacob ben Ephraim, ein Anti-Karäischer Polemiker des Zehnten Jahrhunderts" (Breslau, 1900, in "Kaufmann Gedenkbuch");
- "Perush R. Sa'adya Gaon le-Dani'el" (Berdychev, 1900);
- "Tanhoum Yeruschalmi et Son Commentaire sur le Livre de Jonas" (Paris, 1900); "Miscellen über Saadja III.: Die Beschreibung des Erlösungs-Jahres in Emunoth we-Deoth ch. 8" (Breslau, 1901);
- "Tehillah le-Dawid" (Kaufmann) in Hebrew (Warsaw, 1902);
- "Le Commentaire sur le Livre d'Osée par Eliezer (ou Eléazar) de Beaugency" (Berdychev, 1902);
- "Anan et Ses Ecrits" (Paris, 1902);
- "Der Arabische Kommentar zum Buche Josua von Abû Zakarjâ Jahjâ Ibn Bal'am" (Frankfort-on-the-Main, 1903);
- "Ephrajim ben Schemarja de Fostât et l'Académie Palestinienne" (Paris, 1904);
- "Schechters Saadyana" (Frankfort-on-the-Main, 1904);
- "Fragments de l'Exegèse Biblique de Menahem bar Chelbo" (Warsaw, 1904);
- "Ibn Hazm über Jüdische Sekten" (London, 1904).

He has contributed also numerous articles to the "Monatsschrift," Stade's "Zeitschrift für die Alttestamentliche Wissenschaft," "Ha-Goren" (Berdychev), "Ha-Ẓefirah" (Warsaw), "Revue des Etudes Juives," and the "Jewish Quarterly Review".

== Bibliography ==
- G. Kressel, Cyclopaedia of modern Hebrew Literature (Leksīqōn has-sifrūt hā'ibrīt be-dōrōt ha-aharōnīm), vol. II, 1965, (Hebrew).
- Encyclopaedia Judaica, vol.13, 929 - 930.
