= Moses Schorr Centre =

Jewish studies school

The Moses Schorr Centre or the Moses Schorr Adult Education Centre founded in Warsaw, Poland (Polish: Centrum im. prof. Mojżesza Schorra), is a project of Ronald S. Lauder Foundation. It was named after Professor Moses Schorr (1873-1941), an eminent Polish rabbi, historian, senator and social activist, best known for promoting educational principles and values. Catering to all people interested in Poland's Jewish culture, Moses Schorr Centre, established in 2001, became a stepping stone for the Professor Moses Schorr Foundation created on 1 July 2004.

The Schorr Centre is located at 6 Twarda St in Warsaw. It offers classes in Hebrew as well as lectures on Jewish culture and history. It is focused on offering students a chance to explore contemporary Jewish themes and issues, to study the lives of great scholars and to discuss the values in Jewish tradition. Through on-line classes and seminars for Jews and non-Jews alike, the Centre aims to foster Hebrew literacy across the entire country, along with Poland's Jewish heritage and Yiddishkeit.
