= Moses Schorr =

Polish historian and rabbi (1874–1941)

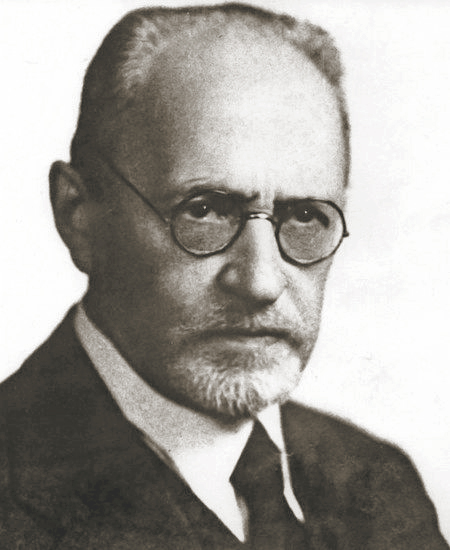
- Moses Schorr, ca. 1921
- Born: May 10, 1874; Przemyśl, Galicia and Lodomeria, Austria-Hungary
- Died: July 8, 1941 (aged 67); Posty, Uzbek SSR, Soviet Union
- Other name: Mojżesz Schorr
- Occupations: Rabbi, scholar, activist
- Known for: Senator of the 2nd Republic of Poland

Moses Schorr, Polish: Mojżesz Schorr (May 10, 1874 – July 8, 1941) was a rabbi, Polish historian, politician, Bible scholar, assyriologist and orientalist. Schorr was an expert on the history of the Jews in Poland. He was the first Jewish researcher of Polish archives, historical sources, and pinkasim. The president of the 13th district B'nai B'rith Poland, he was a humanist and modern rabbi who ministered the central synagogue of Poland during its last years before the Holocaust.

Schorr was the first historian to undertake the systematic study of Jewish history in Poland, and Galicia in particular. He made discoveries after finding and translating Babylonian, Assyrian, and Hittite legislative annals. As a scholar of the jurisprudence and civilizations of the Ancient Middle East, Schorr was a legal philosopher and sociologist of Ancient Middle Eastern societies. Schorr was appointed to the Polish Senate by Polish president Ignacy Mościcki (1926–1939). Schorr did not belong to any political party, although he was inclined to Zionism. He was active in the social, public, and religious life of Polish Jews, and was often chosen by them to head public organisations and represent Polish Jewry to Polish and international powers, though he never sought the role for himself.

== Birth and early years ==
Moses Schorr was born on May 10, 1874, in the town of Przemyśl in the province of Galicia, then a kreis town within Austro-Hungarian empire. Moses was the oldest son of Osjasz Schorr, the director of the Jewish cooperative bank in Przemyśl, and of Esther Schorr (née Friedman). He had two brothers, Adolf and Samuel, who both became lawyers in Lwów and Jarosław, respectively. Moses started his education at the Przemyśl gymnasium where he completed his studies in 1893. At gymnasium, and from his father and private teachers, he acquired the basics of Judaic lore. Among his teachers was the grandfather of a Slavist, Moshe Altbauer, who instructed Moses in the Bible and Talmud.

== Rabbinical and philosophical studies ==
Schorr moved to Vienna, where he embarked upon the study of theology at the Jewish Theological Institute from 1893 to 1900. The institute, founded in October 1893 with the assistance of Albert von Rothschild, was modeled in part after the Jewish Theological Seminary of Breslau. At that time it had 11 teachers and 26 students preparing for the rabbinate. Among Schorr's teachers were Adolf Schwarz in Talmud and religious-ritual codes, David Heinrich Müller in Biblical exegesis and Semitic linguistics, Adolf Bücher in Jewish history and Meir Friedman in Midrash studies. Schorr studied philosophy at University of Vienna and Lwów University between 1893 and 1898. During his studies in Vienna, Schorr learned Hebrew and other oriental languages, showing particular interest in Egyptian mythology and psychology.

In 1898 Schorr attained the degree of Doctor of Philosophy and Medieval Studies at Lwów University. In spring 1900 he received the diploma of rabbi in Vienna, being among the first dozen graduates of Rothschild's seminary.

=== Lecturing in Lwów ===
Soon after graduation he became a lecturer at the Jewish Teachers Seminary and the Teachers Gymnasium in Lwów (now Lviv), working there until 1923, while he also engaged in educational and social work. Of his time teaching in Lwów he wrote to a Polish sociologist Ludwik Gumplowicz:

... For a long time I have not written to you of my old intentions to continue studying aiming at a dozent position. Besides, that "spirit" of semitology ... has not left me for a moment, haunting me as a shadow at every step. I have not lost contact with orientalistics, not for a bit. I have used every free minute to get acquainted with the ever growing literature, but unfortunately these free moments are quite rare. Professional work takes a lot of my time and causes a painful conflict between a forced, often mechanical work which I lack internal vocation for, and the results of my [oriental] studies ... On one hand, I do not want to be a charlatan in the profession, I even know that I have a certain mission as the religion teacher in Galicia and could even attain the "laurels" of the reformer in this subject. But I lack this specific ambition or enthusiasm. On the other hand, I am becoming convinced that I would have to study at least a year at the university (Berlin or Leipzig) so that I could independently work with Assyriology here. I have to admit for a moment that I have become a personality here, and everywhere they try to involve me in a friendly, humanitarian and scientific life ... and every day the circle of my "social virtues" widens itself — popular meetings, ceremonial speeches, committees, collectives etc., etc., — all this distracts me from my work, as I see myself suddenly thrown into the whirl of life when I would like to remain still unknown among my co-confessors. As an unripened apple I am plucked from the tree and I still miss my tree — knowledge. As for the altruistic impulses, I think that I still have enough time to realize them ... Lviv, January, 1901

Schorr corresponded with a number of intellectuals of that time, including Ludwig Gumplowicz, to whom he wrote at least 46 letters, and Simon Dubnow in Odessa. His correspondence with Dubnow has not been studied yet. Schorr's letters to Gumplowicz were published by R. Żebrowski.

== Studies in Semitic languages ==
Schorr received a scholarship from the Austrian Ministry of Education. He went to Berlin for two years where he studied Semitic languages, Assyriology, and the history of the ancient Orient under the guidance of famous scholars. In 1905–1906, he studied Arabic philology in Vienna under the guidance of semitologist David Heinrich Müller, who exerted a strong influence on Schorr. Müller taught Schorr Biblical criticism and Semitology at the Seminary, and a decade later, Arabic linguistics. Müller advanced a theory on the structure and form of the Biblical Psalms, which Schorr later developed in a series of articles.

== Professor at Lwów University ==
In 1904 Schorr was appointed a lecturer as privatdozent, and in March 1910, associate professor of Semitic languages and history of the Ancient Orient at Lwów University, a chair which he later held in Warsaw.

In 1904–1905 he headed the Toynbeehali, the Society for the promotion of education among Jews in Lwów. He was one of the founders and long-term members of Opieka ("Care"), a society to support Jewish Youth in the secondary schools. During his stay in Lwów, Schorr was one of the founders and the first head of the "Society of the teachers of Moses religion of the people's secondary schools of Galicia". He led the first teachers' congress in 1904 in Lwów. He was a member of the board of the Jewish Community Library in Lwów from its inception, and later was its head.

=== Relation to Zionism ===
Schorr took part in the 7th Zionist Congress of 1910 in Basel. The Congress and his stay in Switzerland made an impression on Schorr, as he writes to Gumplowicz:

There is no need to stress how strong an impression I got from the wonderful views of Swiss nature. I will stay here in Basel for 14 days for the whole duration of the 7th Zionist Congress, which is going to start on Thursday. Already today there are several hundred guests, most from Russia, among them the outstanding Jewish figures, and many ladies, as well. Already today, the Congress seems to me to be the most powerful manifestation of Jewish solidarity around the world. During the entire course of Jewish history, there was no such movement that would so deeply enter the consciousness of all the Jews with such an enthusiasm. But already nowadays various groups with different tendencies are being formed, away from the main fundamental idea.

Schorr took part in the conference but did not make any public speeches. Regarding the Zionist movement, he wrote:

As for the Zionist movement ... I am noting in advance, that in my opinion the historical proofs can not be decisive for the present. After all, Professor Winkler proved that the Jews had never been to Egypt but does this mean that the Jewish religion, that is based on the fact of the Exodus of the Jews from Egypt and its consequences, should disappear from history?

Żebrowski presumes that Schorr's participation in the Congress was perhaps one of the reasons that a rich merchant, a banker and fervent Zionist, chose Schorr as a husband for his daughter Tamara. They were married in the synagogue of Prussian Königsberg (modern Kaliningrad) on 31 October 1905.

=== Professor in Semitic languages ===
In April 1916 Schorr received the degree of merited professor of Lwów University in the field of Semitic languages and Ancient Oriental history, combining this post with other duties at the same university until 1923. In 1912 he participated in the international congress of orientalists in Athens, where he was one of the secretaries of the semitology section and presented a lecture entitled "Sumerian and Semitic Beginnings of the Ancient Babylonian Law", which was published in the Paris edition of Revue Semitique. In 1918 he became a member of the Oriental committee at the Kraków Academy, and in 1920 a member of the Polish Scientific Society in Lwów, and in 1923 one of the founders of the Polish Oriental Society in Lwów.

In 1917-1918 he headed the Jewish Rescue Committee in Lwów, and from 1916 on he was a member of the central committee to help the Jewish orphans in the city. The Society of Jewish National and Secondary school, which was established at the beginning of 1919, chose him its first head, and in 1920 entitled him a merited member of the society.

== Transfer to Warsaw ==
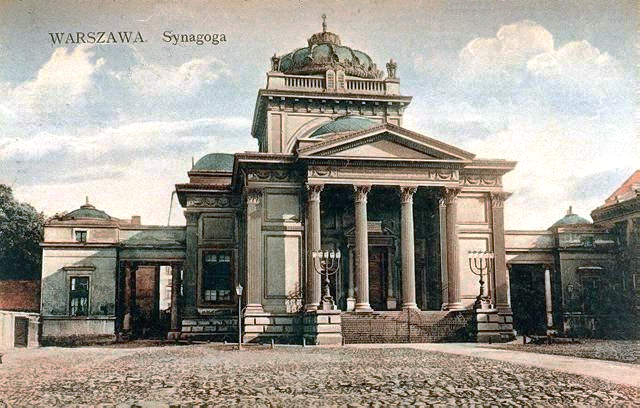
Great Synagogue, Warsaw, where Schorr preached

Schorr moved to Warsaw in 1923. He was invited to Warsaw to succeed Samuel Poznański as preacher at the Great Synagogue, Warsaw on Tłomackie street. Designed to seat 1,100, it was the largest synagogue and community in Europe and second largest in the world, behind only New York. (Note: He was its last minister, and started his term 20 years before it was blown up by the Nazis in retaliation for the Warsaw Ghetto Uprising in 1943.)The Warsaw Judaic community numbered 352,659 Jews in the 1931 census. Schorr also became a member of the Warsaw rabbinical council, one of the top Jewish religious authorities in Poland. Some of his preachings were published. He was elected to the position of inter-regional rabbi whose main duties and functions were to represent the Jewish community in front of the state and administrative authorities. Schorr was appointed a member of the city and regional School Councils by the Jewish community board.

In 1924 he became the head of the State Examination Committee for Jewish teachers of religion and Judaic subjects in secondary schools, and a member of the Ministerial Commission for the evaluation of school handbooks in the field of Judaica.

== Warsaw University ==
In 1926 Schorr became a professor at the University of Warsaw. Schorr headed the Institute of Semitic languages and history of the Ancient Orient. In 1927 he initiated the creation of the committee for setting up the Jewish Library at the Great Synagogue in Warsaw and became its head. This library was completed in 1936. Today the library building houses the Jewish Historical Institute.

=== Institute of Judaic Sciences in Warsaw ===
In February 1928 Schorr, together with M. Balaban, Tohn and Braud, founded the Institute of Judaic Sciences for the research of Judaic sciences and Judaism, in particular Biblical subjects, philosophy, religion, Talmud, sociology, Semitic languages and Hebrew literature. It was located on the site of the present-day Jewish Historical Institute, beside the Great Synagogue. It functioned on a state budget, with donations from foreign Jewish institutions. The Institute retained a library which numbered over 35,000 books, documents and magazines. Professor Schorr became the first rector of the newly created institution, and served in that capacity during 1928–1930 and 1933–34.

In 1933-1934 he was elected a member of the Polish Academy of Sciences, and in 1935 a member of the Finnish Oriental Society in Helsinki. In 1937 Schorr received the title of merited doctor from the Jewish Theological Seminary in New York.

== Schorr and B'nai B'rith ==
From 1901 on, Schorr was a member of the humanitarian society B'nai B'rith "Leopolis" in Lwów, where for a few years he led the library. The B'nai B'rith "Leopolis" was founded in 1889 and since 1932 had its own building at 3 Maja street, 10. The archival documentation of B'nai B'rith "Leopolis" has been partially preserved and is still to be studied. From 1922 "Leopolis" was incorporated into the 13th district of B'nai B'rith Poland and numbered 217 persons, the largest lodge in Poland.

From 1921 Schorr was the president of the Lwów branch of B'nai B'rith in Galicia, part of the 12th district of B'nai B'rith Austria.

In 1922 Schorr was elected the vice president of the Polish district, while the president was lawyer Dr Adolf Ader from Kraków. From 1924 he was the president of the lodge Braterstwo ("Brotherhood") in Warsaw. This lodge numbered 85 members, including 32 merchants, 14 physicians, 13 engineers, eight lawyers, eight industrialists, six bankers, one writer, three senators (Moses Koerner, Schorr, and banker Rafael Szereszowski), one deputy (lawyer Dr Apolinary Hartgas) and two professors — Schorr and his close colleague, historian and friend Meir Balaban. The lodge reached its highest membership in 1931, when it had 130 members. After Schorr's resignation from its presidency, his role was taken over by Meir Balaban and consequently the lodge was headed by lawyer Maurycy Edelman, merchant Maurycy Meyzel, Seminary director Meir Tauber and lawyer Ignacy Bamberg.

The headquarters of Warsaw Braterstwo lodge were located at Rymarska 8 street. In the years of his presidency, Schorr organised many initiatives, undertakings, and cultural events, managed the meetings of so-called "speaking diaries" with the participation of renown personalities, writers and publicists. He took part in the creation of Auxilium Academicum Judaicum, an organisation formed for the erection of the Jewish Academic House in Warsaw. Schorr's brotherhood played a role in the founding of the Reform Institute of Judaic Sciences and the publishing society Menora that published the magazine Miesięcznik Żydowski (Jewish Monthly, 1930–1935), which was under the influence of B'nai B'rith. Through the Warsaw lodge, Schorr co-organised and supported the Relief Committee for the Jewish victims of the economic crisis, continuing his role in the religious affairs of the nomination of rabbis and Orthodox influences. While heading the Warsaw lodge, Schorr set up a special literary award for an outstanding writer of Jewish origin.

Rich members of the lodge played an important role in the charity activities of the lodge. Among them was a friend of Schorr, wood merchant Horacy Heller, who assigned for social activities 20,000 dollars. Significant sums were donated by his colleagues, banker Szereszowski (one of two Jewish colleagues in the Polish Senate), Dr. Joseph Landau, industrialist Maurycy Raabe, and others. In the years 1937–1938, a violent anti-Masonic campaign took place in Poland that led to the special decree of 1938 that dissolved any sort of free Masonic societies, including B'nai B'rith.

Moses Schorr performed the functions of vice president of the B'nai B'rith Lodge "Solidaność" (Solidarity) in Kraków. There are dozens of letters written by Schorr preserved in the B'nai B'rith collection of the State Archives in that city. During his presidency Schorr corresponded with a number of B'nai B'rith officials, including the Secretary of the Great Conventional Lodge in Chicago. Polish historian Dr Bogusława Czajecka delivered a paper "Moses Schorr as social activist in the light of B'nai B'rith documents (1922–1938)" during the scientific session on Schorr at the Polish Academy of Arts in Kraków in 1993.

Schorr's views on B'nai B'rith's goals and their practical application in terms of social activities are expressed in his work (in Polish) "Ideals of the Order B'nai B'rith and their Application Towards Real Life Conditions." Schorr describes B'nai B'rith as follows:

... The union of B'nai B'rith, as an international organization (...) is characterized by two fundamental principles: the idea of solidarity of all the Jews in the entire world (...), the idea of universalism of humanity, the brotherhood of all the peoples and nations (...). These two ideas I consider for the highest goal of our spiritual and intellectual program ...

Schorr's initiative helped with the creation of the Lodge "Montefiory" in Łódź, then the second largest Jewish urban community in Poland, with 222,497 Jews. In 1928 lodges "Montefiore" and "Braterstwo" took up the discussion concerning the official name of the organisation, arguing between B'nai B'riss and B'nei B'rith formulations. Schorr's suggestion "...taking into consideration the scientific and practical views, the name of the order should be written "B’nei B’rith" was adopted unanimously.

Schorr authored an appeal of the information bureau of the lodge "Braterstwo" about the situation of the Jews in Germany and other countries after 1933. Schorr was a member of the committee which managed the bureau. His goal in the activity of B'nai B'rith was to unify the principle of national solidarity among the Jews with the ideas of universalism.

== Schorr and political life ==
Though Schorr did not take an active part in political life, he participated as a scientific expert in a questionary campaign about the problems of the Jewish community in Poland arranged in February 1919 by the Governmental Commission. The protocols of the campaign were published in a separate book, W sprawie polsko-żydowskiej. Ankieta ("Concerning the Polish-Jewish question. Questionnary").

Schorr concentrated mainly on scientific work, teaching, and social activities, rather than politics, but in 1935, the president of Poland Ignacy Mościcki named him Senator in the parliament. In his parliamentary speeches, along with articles in the Jewish press, such as Nasz Przegląd and Chwila, Schorr expressed his concern about the growth of antisemitism in Poland and the passive conduct of the authorities in this regard. He led the Jewish immigration and colonial committee, which aimed to make possible the Jewish immigration from Poland to countries other than Palestine. He participated in the Évian Conference in France on the problem faced by 500,000 Jewish refugees from Germany and Austria with the advent of the Nazi regime and the Anschluss of Austria in 1938. The Évian Conference, held in Évian-les-Bains on the French shore of Lake Geneva, was convened at the initiative of US President Franklin D. Roosevelt, who invited European, American, and Australian delegates for an open discussion on organising the resettlement and immigration of those who experienced persecution on the basis of religion or race. Schorr was one of the key speakers in Évian and was highly involved as many Jews fled Germany for Poland. Golda Meir represented Palestine as an observer.

== Last years ==
After the beginning of World War II, Schorr entered the Jewish Civil Committee and on 6 or 7 September he left Warsaw. He knew that the Nazis would not spare him, as he was an active Jewish social leader who often spoke against fascism in the parliament. These fears forced him and his wife, Tamara, to escape eastwards. His daughter Felicia lived in the town of Ostróg near Równe with her three children (two her own and one of her sister Sonia). Moses and Tamara Schorr reached Ostróg on 27 September.

=== Arrest by NKVD ===
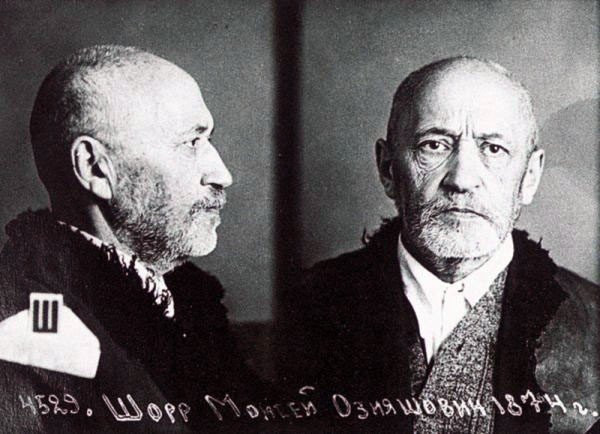
Moses Schorr after the arrest in 1941

The appearance of Schorr was quickly noted by Soviet securities in the town. Two days after his arrival, Schorr was arrested by Ostróg NKVD (Soviet secret police) branch, and was kept in custody in the local prison for a week. Later he was transferred to the nearby regional administrative center of Łuck, where he spent another week in prison.

=== Confinement and questioning ===
On 24 of September he transferred to Lwów where he had lived until 1923. In confinement, Schorr was forced to fill in a questionnaire, was photographed, and had his personal belongings taken: his golden watch, pen, scissors, organiser, a file of photos. The scholar was asked when, by whom and why was he appointed for the Senator's position, when did he become a rabbi, and to which party did he belong. Schorr answered that President Mościcki appointed him to the Polish Senate in the capacity of Rabbi of Warsaw and that he did not belong to any political party. The prosecutor noted down only his words concerning his rabbinical functions and an account of the marriage of Schorr's daughter Sophia (residing in Paris) with an official of the Polish Ministry of Justice. Schorr's wife and daughter Felicia moved to Lwów, where Felicia worked as a waitress.

=== Imprisonment at Lubyanka ===
On February 3, the newly appointed Russian prosecutor of the Lvov branch of the NKVD, Lopunov, received an order from the Deputy of the Peoples Committee of the Ministry for State Security V.N. Merkulov to send him to Moscow for a continuation of the investigation. Schorr was sent in convoy to the First Special Department of the Soviet NKVD. In the accompanying documentation, he was noted to be "healthy".

In Moscow he was held in Lubyanka Prison, in the same cell with the Bund activist Victor Alter, the poet Władysław Broniewski, and the Polish Senator of the National Party professor Stanisław Głąbiński. The Polish nationalist later recollected that became such close friends that they slept together on one bench. In the accounts of cell inmate Mrs. Wisia Wagner from 10 August 1943 we read:

Cell no. 21 was little. It housed 30 persons. Among them the main rabbi of Warsaw, renowned scientist, professor of Warsaw University Dr Moses Schorr, the activist of Bund Victor Alter, Senator professor Stanisław Gląbiński – the leader of Polish National Democrats and other personalities, who formed the intellectual elite of Poland. I spent a few days together with Professor Schorr. Despite his elderly age, he was constantly taken for torturing questioning and beaten. He was awakened in the middle of the night, led away for many hours and only in the morning returned. As he told us in the cell, he was accused of belonging to the protagonists of the bourgeois government. I spent 10 days with Prof Schorr and was astonished by his spiritual posture, despite the sufferings, he did not allow himself to get broken and after questioning was coming back calm and full of dignity. By chance he happened to share his cell with the leader of Endecja [Polish Nationalist Party pursuing the policy of tough assimilation of the minorities]. The representative of Jewish people and former antisemite went into so friendly a relationship that they slept on the same cell bed. After 10 days Prof Schorr was driven off from our prison and I have not seen him ever since.

=== Liberation attempts ===
The attempts to liberate Schorr, which were undertaken by the Polish government-in-exile with the mediation of the Vatican and the United States Department of State did not succeed. In February 1940, Cordell Hull, as Secretary of State during the presidency of Franklin D. Roosevelt, appealed to the Soviet powers through the mediation of international organisations to find Schorr and rescue him from the Soviet prisons. This did not produce any results. The President of the Council of Ministers of the Polish government in exile, Władysław Sikorski, applied to the Minister of Foreign Affairs of his government with the following letter:

I ask you Sir Minister about the entreatment of our Ambassador in the Vatican with the intervention, aimed to free Professor Schorr, arrested by the Bolshevik powers in Lwów. I consider the diplomatic means through Vatican to be the most advisable solution of this matter. After release, I ask you to direct Professor Schorr to France. Head of the Council of Ministers – Gen. Div. Sikorski.

=== Concentration camp and death ===
On 17 April 1941, Schorr was assigned to five years of mandatory prison labour. He was taken to the NKVD's fifth concentration camp in Posty, Uzbekistan, where he fell ill and died in a camp hospital on 8 July 1941. He was buried in grave no. C-30 on the grounds of the hospital. On December 30, 1941, it was reported that the Polish ambassador in Moscow had learned of Schorr's death on July 8, 1941. The Polish government had been trying to liberate him a second time, planning to appoint him to the post of the main Rabbi of the Anders Army, which was forming at that time, but it was too late.

On February 24, 1942, the Jewish Telegraph Agency reported that the Soviet government had identified the location of Schorr's grave.

Jewish publisher A. Sztibel wrote the following lines about Schorr :

At every ship arriving in America from Europe, nearly every Polish Jew claims to be the leader of the Jews of Poland. These are the people, whose names I never heard, despite the fact that I was born and brought up in Poland. In the meanwhile professor Schorr, a real authority of Polish Jewry, is kept in Bolshevik prisons and no one makes the slightest effort to rescue him ... (A. Sztibel, letter to Cyrus Adler)

== Schorr's family ==
After the German attack of the Soviet Union (Operation Barbarossa—June 1941), Schorr's wife, daughter Felicia, and grandchildren, left Lwów for Warsaw. They endured internment in the Warsaw Ghetto, but obtained Costa Rican and Nicaraguan passports (from daughter Sonia). They were next interned at Warsaw's Pawiak Prison on 19 June 1942 as citizens of a neutral state. After several months, they were transferred to the French town of Vittel in Alsace, where they arrived on 20 October 1943, to be exchanged for German prisoners of war. In Vittel, they were held in a special hotel guarded by the Gestapo along with 300 other Jews with foreign passports.

After more than a year of waiting, it became clear that the next day they would all be deported to the Drancy internment camp, from where detainees were transported to Auschwitz. Tamara Schorr and her daughter Felicia Kon decided to commit suicide on 17 April 1944 so that Felicia's children, as orphans, could avoid transfer. Tamara Schorr died after consuming poison. Her daughter Felicia was wounded after she jumped out a window, and was taken to hospital. Their other daughter, Sonia, managed to reach New York City with her husband Arthur Miller toward the end of 1940.

=== Children ===
Schorr was married in 1905 to Tamara Ben Jacob, the daughter of Yitzhak Ben Jacob (1858–1926), a publisher, Zionist, banker and bibliographer from Wilno. They had six children:

- Sonia, wife of Arthur Miller, the prosecutor of the Warsaw High Court and the head of the criminal law department at the Ministry of Justice of Poland; she died in 1961.
- Deborah (died in Lwów in 1917)
- Felicia Kon-Lipets; (died in New York City in 1984)
- Ludwig (1918–1963), an architect who settled in Tel Aviv
- Esther, in marriage Ben-Kohav (died in Jerusalem in 1991)
- Joshua (Otton), an engineer in Jerusalem who died in 2005

== Awards and remembrances ==
Schorr was awarded Poland's Golden Cross of Merit. His name is listed on the memorial next to the Polish Parliament erected in memory of the Senators of the II Polish Republic who perished at the hands of the NKVD and the Nazis.

A scientific meeting was devoted to Schorr. In 1993 a similar meeting took place at the Polish Academy of Sciences in Kraków. In 2001 an Educational Center named in honor of Prof. Moses Schorr was established in Warsaw, aimed at the education of the Jewish community remaining in Poland. Schorr Center was founded as one of the projects of Ronald Lauder Foundation to cultivate Jewish literacy, culture, and history among Jews all over Poland.

=== Streets in Israel named after Schorr ===
There are streets named after Schorr in Jerusalem, Tel Aviv and Holon.

== Scientific legacy ==
The first stream of Schorr's scientific activity deals with the history of Polish Jews. Schorr's historiographic approach and view upon the methodology applied to the study of the history of Polish Jewry is summarized in his own writing:

The major defect of the methods of research of Jewish history in Poland is that the general issues were studied before the details had been exposed. There was attempt to present the history of the Jews in entire Poland, before this history had been reviewed in specific cities. The historical entireness was treated, before the elemental processes had been exposed. Therefore, also today's general works on the history of Polish Jewry, and they are few after all, are characterised by the dilettante forms, lacking integrity, accurateness and clarity in subject presentation. Their material used is meager and not sufficient to encompass the entirety of the history of Polish Jewry, neither in the political-economic sphere nor in the cultural developments. An appropriate solid basis for such a general task can only be constructed by virtue of the archival material, which is so abundantly accumulated in different archives and partially the libraries. The fundamental, scientific presentation of the entire history will only be possible when the factual historical, economic and cultural developments in the major cities will be multilaterally studied on the basis of archival sources. Publication and analysis of the archival documents should be the first task preceding the general studies." — M. Schorr. Lwów, October 1902

The techniques and methods Schorr used in historical studies were far ahead of his young age (28) and the time in which he worked. He began his scientific work as an auditor in Vienna University in 1897 with his paper entitled Zur Geschichte des Don Josef Nasi ("Concerning the history of Don Joseph Nasi"), which was published in Monatschrift fur die Wiessenschaft des Judenstum. In this work he analyses the relations of Joseph Nasi (1524–1579) with the Polish king Sigismund August (1520–1572) in light of the situation of Jews in Poland at that time. Joseph Nasi was a Portuguese born marrano (secret Jew) appointed the Lord of Tiberias and the Duke of Naxos and the Seven Islands. He was one of the first Zionists and an influential Ottoman statesman during the reign of Selim II (1566–1574). Schorr analysed the relations of Joseph Nasi with Poland. Though he was a 20-year-old student at the time, he corrected a fundamental error of Graetz, a leading historian, who claimed that Sigismund August acknowledged a number of commercial privileges for the Polish Jews by virtue of the services of Joseph Nasi to Polish diplomacy at the Ottoman court. On the basis of sources found by Schorr in the historical city archives of Lwów, he came to the conclusion that Joseph Nasi was not guided by altruism but wanted the privilege to trade in Lwów for himself, and obtained it.

=== Doctoral dissertation ===
Schorr's doctoral dissertation, entitled Organizacja Żydów w Polsce ("The Organisation of Jews in Poland"), was first published in Lwów's historical quarterly, Kwartalnik historyczny in 1899, and was later translated into Russian and published in Voskhod. In 1903 Schorr was awarded the Wawelberg Prize (provided by the famous Polish-Russian banker and philanthropist) for his work Żydzi w Przemyślu do roku 1772 ("Jews in Przemyśl until 1772"). It was republished in 1991 in Jerusalem with an introduction by Jakub Goldberg and an epilogue by his last surviving son, Joshua Otton Schorr. The Organisation of Jews in Poland is a serious attempt to summarise the data about the Qahal organisation of the central institutions of Jewish self-administration—the vaads and the brotherhoods of Jewish craftsmen. Schorr wrote to Ludwik Gumplowicz from Vienna in October 1897:

... the organization of Jews in Poland is thus one of the most important and the most interesting parts of Jewish culture in Poland; I will only note the huge importance "the council of four lands" had directing the life of Polish Jews for 200 years. In general, my intention is to devote myself to the study of Jewish history in Poland. For the next task of mine I consider the publication of the most important archival documents concerning the Jews—the way Bershadsky began that already. During my search of the City Historical Archives in Lwów, I became convinced that there are real treasures for the history of Polish Jews. I am staying all the time in Vienna, except holidays. I still have 1½ years until finishing my theological studies. I doubt very much that I will be following the profession of a preacher [rabbi] in practice. I am more fond of scientific work. I repeat that your interest in my historical works is a good stimulus for me; that motivates me even more to my intended research ....

=== Monograph "Jews in Przemyśl" ===
Another work, the monograph about the Jews in Przemyśl, is precious not only for its concise examination of the history of this community but also for the numerous Polish, Latin, and Hebrew documents from the 16th to 18th centuries concerning the history of the Przemyśl Jewish community, which are added at the end of the book: nearly half of the work. Schorr starts his historical account from the early 15th century, when the first Jews began to appear sporadically in significant numbers in the major cities of Czerwona Rus' Red Ruthenia: Lwów, Halicz, Przemyśl and Sanok. The first historical mention of Jews in Przemyśl dates from 1466, and Schorr included next a review of the privileges of Sigismund II August (1548–1572); a statute ad bonum ordinem of Stephen Báthory of Poland (king of Poland from 1576 to 1586) and other privileges; contracts; antisemitic assaults; and documents about internal Jewish organisation. The last chapter deals with the Jewish professional brotherhoods, including Jewish artisan and tailor fraternities—their emergence, organisation, and role in society. The author notes Jewish religious societies such as the Society of Psalms Readers (whose task was gathering in synagogue each day before sunrise to recite the psalms) and the Chevra kadisha (the holy society responsible for burying the dead). Schorr explores the pinkasim (books or journals) of the brotherhoods. He was the first to note the existence of Jewish artisan brotherhoods in that period after finding the records of the Przemyśl guild of Jewish artisans from the 17th and 18th centuries. The wide usage of pinkasim for historical studies was innovative at that time.

Among the wide range of sources presented in the second part of the book we find the first fundamental privilege given by king Sigismund II August to the Jews of Przemyśl in 1559, allowing them to live there with the same rights and freedoms as other townsmen (no. 1); the Order of Sigismund II August to the mayor and counselors regarding the attack on the Jews in 1561 (no. 2); the contract of 1595 between the town hall and Jewish elders on the matter of Jewish participation in the fortification of the city (no. 20); the protest of town pharmacists against the Jewish elders for the production of medical items by the Jews in 1677 (no. 121); the order of the governor of Rus' lands Jabłonowski allowing a free election of a rabbi after the ardent requests of "unfaithful" Jewish elders and the whole synagogue of Przemyśl (no. 130). Several Polish sources from 1759 published in this edition (nos. 143 – 144) deal with charges against the Jews of Stupnica in a supposed ritual Easter murder, their tortures and refusal of the charges, and the consequent execution of the accused. A similar Polish document (no. 76) from the year 1646 deals with charges of ritual child murder against twelve Przemyśl Jews, one of whom was punished. Schorr preserves the archaic form of the old Polish language in the documents which gives them a special character.

=== Work on Jewish laws and privileges ===
Schorr published The Cracow code of Jewish laws and privileges in Poland, and wrote an article about its significance and the contradictory questions regarding the main privileges.

Schorr is the author of a lengthy article about the Hebrew language in the Encyklopedja Polska (Polish Encyclopedia, vol. III, 1915). One of his last works in the field of Jewish history in Poland, is Rechtsstellung und innere Verfassung der Juden in Polen ("The Legal Situation and Internal Organisation of Jews in Poland"), published in German in Berlin and Vienna in 1917.

=== Schorr as Orientalist ===
The second major stream of Schorr's scientific activity concerns Bible studies (in particular research of Biblical Law), Assyriology, and the history of the Ancient Near East in general. Schorr's works were mainly focused on these subjects from 1904. Schorr's switch to Oriental studies was caused partly by professional circumstances: Polish historian Krzysztof Pilarczyk notes that Schorr could not be assured of a professorship in the field of Jewish history in Poland. In 1902 Schorr became interested in the newly discovered Hammurabi Code and thus in the laws of Ancient Babylon and Assyria. Schorr's interest was rooted in his religious beliefs and interest in the Bible and Oriental and Egyptian mythology. His years at the gymnasium and university prepared him to study texts in the Hebrew, Assyrian, and Babylonian languages.

His first works in Oriental studies included a paper on the excavations and discoveries at Amarna (1900), followed by the investigation of Starożytności biblijne w swietle archiwum egipskiego ("Biblical Antiquities in the Light of the Egyptian Archive"). This was published in the magazine Przewodnik naukowy i literacki in 1901 and separately as well. In 1903 Schorr commented extensively on Babel und Bibel ("Babylon and Bible"), a book by his former German tutor Friedrich Delitzsch (1902). Schorr's commentary, "Kultura Babilońska a starohebrajska" ("Babylonian and Hebrew Culture"), appeared in Lwów's Kwartalnik historyczny and later in a separate edition. Kwartalnik Historyczny was the major publication for Lwów historians at that time and Schorr was one of its regular contributors.

Some of Schorr's works were written and published in German, his second native language; German was then an official Habsburg language in Eastern Galicia, along with Polish and Ukrainian. One such study is Die Kohler-Peiserische Hammurabi Übersetzung ("The Peiser-Kohler Translation of the Hammurabi Code).

=== Research on Babylonian history ===
Schorr's main work on the subject of Babylonian history was Państwo i społeczeństwo babilońśke w kresie t.zw. dynastyi Hammurabiego ("The Babylonian State and Society at the Time of the Hammurabi Dynasty); this was published as a separate volume in 1906 in Lwów and later was published in Kwartalnik historyczny. Another work by Schorr in German is Eine Babylonische Seisachtie aus dem Anfang der Kassitenzeit, ende XVIII vorchristl. Jahrhunderts ("The Babylonian Seisachtie of the Times of the Kassites Dynasty, the End of 18th century BC"). In this paper Schorr presents and discusses an ancient Babylonian text newly discovered by the Oxford Assyriologist Stephen Herbert Langdon.

He conducted research on the history of the social and commercial life of the Ancient Orient, and particularly trade in ancient Babylon. The work's title is Ruch handlowy w Satorożytnej Babilonii ("The trade movement in old Babylon"). It was published in 1911 in a commemorative book celebrating the 25th anniversary of the founding of Lwów University.

Schorr translated and systematised old Babylonian legal documents and wrote an extensive commentary entitled Altbabylonische Rechtsurkunden aus der Zeit der I -ste Babylonische Dynastie ("Old Babylonian legal documents from the First Babylonian dynasty"). The legal issues and the legal history of the laws were the main subjects of Schorr's research. He did significant research in comparative studies of the legal systems of Babylon and the surrounding cultures of that time, in particular the Hebrew legal system.

Kodeks Hammurabiego a ówczesna praktyka prawna ("The Hammurabi Code and Ancient Oriental Legal Practices") first appeared in Rozprawy (Studies) of the historical department of Kraków Academy of Sciences; in 1907 it was published separately.

Schorr's Urkunden des altbabylonische Zivil- und Prozessrechts ("The Documents of the Old Babylonian Civil and Criminal Law) is considered to be his greatest scholarly achievement in the Oriental field. It is a volume of sources with extensive comments by Schorr.

== Publications in Zionist daily Chwila ==
Schorr actively cooperated with the Lwów Zionist newspaper Chwila ("The Wave"), published in the inter-war period. These articles remain unexamined by historians. The newspapers for 1918-1939 are kept in the scientific library of Lwów University. The most important articles are Palestyna a Babylon w świetle najnowszych wykopalisk ("Palestine and Babylon in the Light of Recent Archaeological Excavations", 1923); and Samuel Hirsch Margulies (1922), which is dedicated to Galicia native Samuel Hirsch Margulies (1858–1922), who became the leader of Italian Jewry. This article was in commemoration of Margulies, who had died that year. In the obituary, Schorr writes:

Italian Jewry has undergone a great loss in the death of the Rabbi of Florence and rector of local rabbinical seminary Dr. Samuel Hirsch Margulies (died on March 12), who had been the Rabbi for more than three decades leaving a strong footprint on a life and culture of the Jews of whole Italy. Margulies was of Polish origin...In 1890 he was called for the position of the Rabbi of Florence, where he managed to become the leader of whole Italian Jewry. He became the spiritual leader in all the spheres of the civic life, on account of his deep Judaic knowledge, organisational abilities and personal favourite pursuits in the subjects of spirit and heart. Thanks to him the indifferent religious life of Italian Jews started to be a live artery filled with strong native Jewish traditions and culture. He also initiated the centralized unification of all Jewish communities which created a new Collegio rabbinico italiano...in Florence...This seminary produced an array of young Rabbis, who started the spiritual renaissance of Italian Jewry."

Schorr's broadest article in Chwila was Prawo Mojżesza na tle poròwnawczem prawodawst Starożytnego Wschodu (The Laws of Moses in Comparative Perspective with the Laws of the Ancient Orient"). This work was a series of articles in several newspaper issues, where Schorr draws comparisons between Biblical and Babylonian laws in the first part of the series, following with a comparison with the Assyrian and Hettite legislatures in the second and third sections. Schorr also refers back to his previous work, The Hettites' Problem, published seven years before in Kwartalnik historyczny.

A few other newly discovered publications of Schorr should be mentioned include Kwestya żydowska w dobie Sejmu Wiekiego ("The Jewish Question at the Time of the Great Sejm"); religious teachings such as Radosna Chwila ("The Joyful Moment"), and Pesach Micarim - Pesach le Atid on the occasion of the Easter celebration.

=== Publications by M. Schorr ===
- Prof Dr. M. Schorr na nowej placówce pracy (Prof. Dr. M. Schorr at the new place of work). Chwila, 18 November 1923.
- Schorr, M. Kwestya żydowska w dobie Sejmu Wielkiego, (Jewish question at the time of the Great Seim). Chwila, 13–24 July 1920.
- Schorr, M. Palestyna a Babylon w świetlie najnowszych wykopalisk, (Palestine and Babylon in the light of new archeological excavations,) Chwila, 27, 28, 30 January 1922; 1–6 February 1922.
- Schorr, M. Prawo Mojżesza na tle porównawczem prawodawstw Starożytnego Wschodu (Moses' Law in comparative perspective with the legislatures of the Ancient Middle East: Assyrian, Babylonian and Hittite) Chwila, 3–7, 13, 17, 19–22, 24–29 November 1923.
- Schorr, M. Radosna Chwila (Joyful moment,) Chwila, 9 December 1923;
- Schorr, M. Pesach Micraim - Pesach le-atid. Haggadah do użytku Chwili (Haggadah for the use of Chwila) Chwila, 14, 15, 17 April 1922;
- Schorr, M. Samuel Hirsch Margulies, 1858–1922, (Samuel Hirsch Margulies, 1858–1922). Chwila, 13 May 1922.
- Schorr, M. Archiwum żydowskiej kolonii wojskowej w Egipcie z V w. (Archive of Jewish military colony in Egypt of the 5th century). Lwów, 1912.
- Schorr, M. Aus der Geschichte der Juden in Przemyśl (History of Jews in Przemyśl). Vienna: Verlag von R. Lövit, 1915, 28 p.
- Schorr, M. Żydzi w Przemyślu do końca XVIII wieku (Jews in Przemyśl until the end of the 18th century). Lwów, 1903. VIII + 294 pp.
- Schorr, M. Żydzi w Przemyślu do końca XVIII wieku. Jerusalem: Israeli Academy of Sciences – Art-Plus, 1991.
- Schorr, M. Pomnik prawa staroassyryjskiego z XII w. przed Chr. (Monument of Old Assyrian Law of 12th century B.C.). Lwów: Archiwum Towarzystwa Naukowego we Lwowie, 1922.
- Schorr, M. Problem Chettytów z powodu najnowszego odkrycia lingwistyczno-historycznego (Problem of the Hittites due to the newest linguistic-historical discovery) in Kwartalnik Historyczny, Lwów, 1916.
- Schorr, M. Przyczynki do frazeologii psalmów biblijnych a babilońskich (Articles concerning the phraseology of Biblical and Psalms), in Rocznik Orientalistyczny, Cracow, 1914 -1915.
- Schorr, M. Język hebrajski w Polsce (Hebrew language in Poland), Encycopedya Polska (Polish encyclopaedia), Vol. 3 (1915).
- Schorr, M. Kultura babilońska a starohebrajska (Babylonian and Hebrew culture). Lwów, 1903, 28 pp.
- Schorr, M. Państwo i spoleczeństwo babilońske w okresie t. zw. dynastyi Hamurabiego okoŀo 2500 - 2000 pr. Chr. (Babylonian state and society in times of Hammurabi dynasty of 2500 - 2000 B.C.). Lwów: Drukarnia Ludowa, 1906.
- Schorr, M. Organizacja Żydów w Polsce od najdawniejszych czasów do r. 1772 (Organisation of Jews in Poland since the earliest times till 1772). Kwartalnik Historyczny (1899).
- Schorr M. Kazanie inagauracyjne wygŀoszone w Wielkiej Synagodze na Tŀomackiem dn. 7. 12. 1923. (Inaugurative speech presented at the Great Tlomacka Synagogue on 2.12.1923). Warsaw: Druk. Kupenztocha i Kramaria, 1923, 28 p.
- Schorr M. Kodeks Hamurabiego a ówczesna praktyka prawna (Hammurabi Code and the Ancient Middle Eastern legal practice). Cracow, 1907;
- Schorr, M. Die Kohler-Peisersche Hammurabi Übersetzung (Kohler-Peiser's translation of the Hammurabi Code) Vienna, 1907;
- Schorr, M. Ważniejsze kwestyi z historyi semickiego Wschodu (The Important Issues on the History of the Semitic Orient) Lwów: Druk. Związkowa, 1907, 60 p.
- Schorr, M. Starożytnosci biblijne w świetlie archiwum egipskiego z XIV w. przed Chrystusem (Biblical Antiquities in the Light of Egyptian Archive of 17th century B.C.) Lwów: Druk. Związkowa, 1901, 34 pp.
- Schorr, M. Tell-Amarna. in Welt, October,1900.
- Schorr, M. Ruch handlowy w Starożytnej Babilonii (The trade movement in the Ancient Babylon) in "Księga pamiątkowa ku uczczeniu zaŀożenia Uniw. Lwowskiego", Lwów, 1911;
- Schorr, M. Urkunden des albabylonischen Zivil- und Prozessrechts (Documents of Old Babylonian civil and criminal law) Leipzig: Vor der Asiatischen Bibliothek, 1913;
- Schorr, M. Zur Geschichte des Don Josef Nasi in Monatschrift für Geschichte und Wissenschaft des Judenthums, 1897, p. 169 – 237.
- Schorr, M. Krakovskiy Svod evreyskikh statutov i privilegiy (Cracow Collection of Jewish statutes and privileges) in Evreyskaya Starina, 1909, vol. III, No. 1. pp 247 – 264 and No. 2, pp. 76 – 94, 223 – 245.
- Schorr, M. Hauptprivilegien der polnischen Judenschaft in "Festschrift Adolf Schwartz zu siebzigsten Geburtstage 15. Juli 1916", Berlin – Vienna, 1917pp. 519 – 538.
- Schorr, M. Rechtsstellung und innere Verfassung der Juden in Polen – Ein geschichtlicher Rundblick in "Der Jude", 1917, No. II (Reprint), pp. 1 – 36.
- Schorr, M. "Staatsseher und Statslehrer – Ein Beitrag zu Biographie Theodor Herzls" in Festschrift zu Simon Dubnows siebzigsten Geburtstag, Berlin, 1930, pp. 262 – 265.
- Schorr, M. Prof. Dr. Majer Balaban – Z powodu 60-lecia Jego urodzin, 20 lutego 1877 r. (Prof Dr Majer Balaban – on the occasion of the 60th anniversary of his birth) in Nasz Przegląd 21.2.1937.
- Schorr, M. Ideally Zakonu B’nei B’rith, a dostosowanie ich do realnych warunków życia (Ideals of the Order B'nai B'rith and their application in real life conditions). Typescript. Archiwum Państwowy w Krakowie / Polish State Archives in Cracow, B'nai B'rith 351.
