= Błękitny Wieżowiec =

Skyscraper in Warsaw, Poland

Blue Skyscraper
- Błękitny Wieżowiec (Polish)
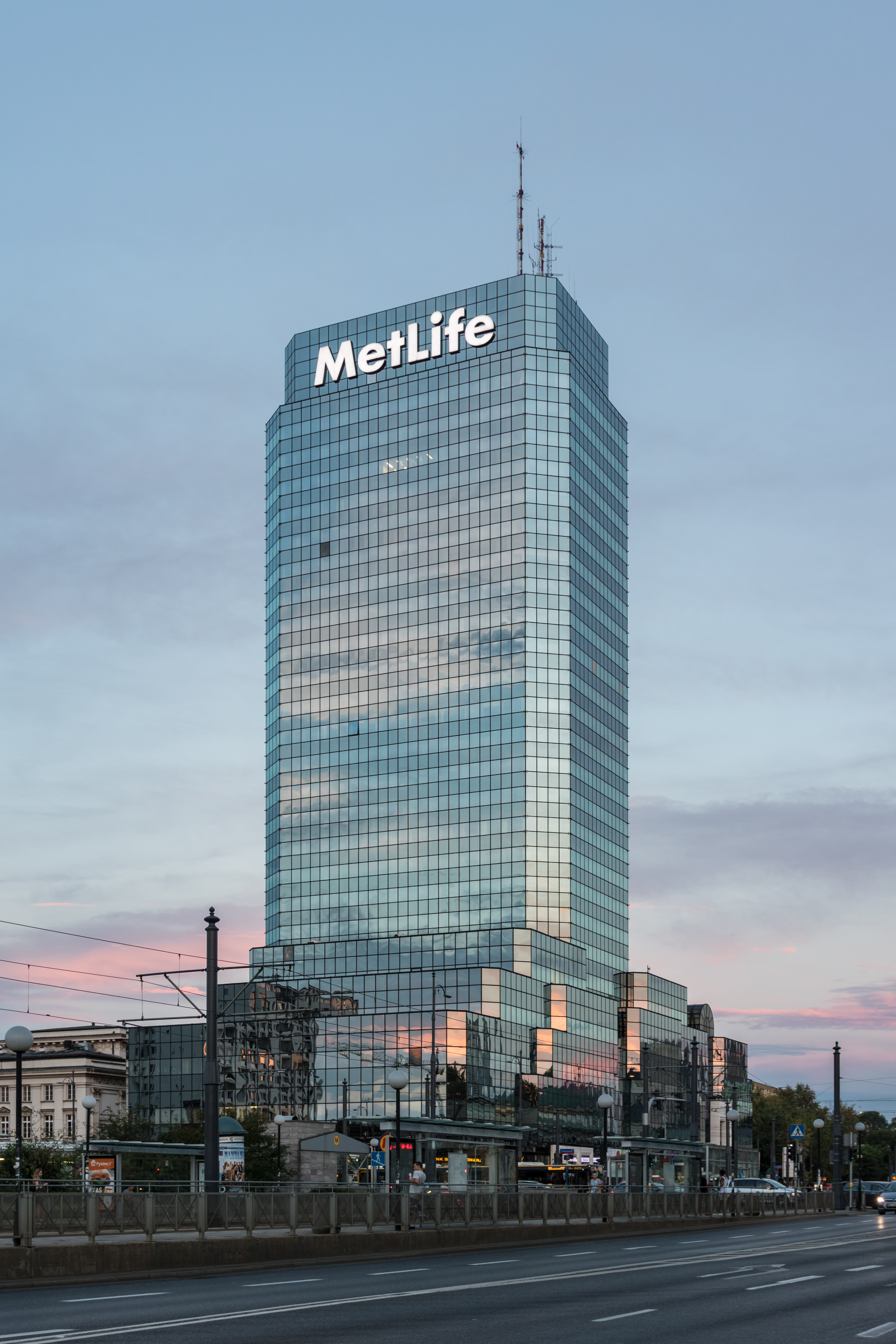
- Interactive map of the Blue Skyscraper area
- Former names: Złoty Wieżowiec (Golden Tower)

General information
- Type: Office
- Location: Warsaw, Poland, Plac Bankowy 2, Śródmieście
- Coordinates: 52.244129°N 21.00226°E
- Construction started: 1966
- Completed: 1991

Height
- Height: 100 m (330 ft)
- Antenna spire: 120 m (390 ft)

Technical details
- Floor count: 27
- Floor area: 23,545 m^{2} (253,440 sq ft)

Design and construction
- Architects: Jerzy Czyż, Andrzej Skopiński, Jan Furman, Lech Robaczyński, Marzena Leszczyńska

The Blue Skyscraper colloquially known as Polish: Błękitny Wieżowiec is a high-rise office building located in the Bank Square of Warsaw, Poland. Built between 1966 and 1991, the tower stands at 100 m (330 ft) tall with 27 floors and is the 46th tallest building in Poland.

== History ==
The building is located in the location previously occupied by Warsaw's largest synagogue, the Great Synagogue, which was destroyed by the Germans in 1943 during World War II. Initial concepts for the construction of the skyscraper had been put forward in the 1950s, and construction began in the 1970s and was suspended shortly after the main structure was built. The unfinished construction was then often called the "golden tower" because of the colour of the facade.

The skyscraper's construction took many years and was interrupted several times. It began in February 1966, but one year later, due to missing documentation and doubts about the structural stability, construction was suspended. In 1971, the building's design and investor were changed again (it was to be intended for the Polimex-Cekop foreign trade headquarters). The construction of the tower resumed in 1974. In 1980, the Presidium of the Government decided to change the building's intended use; it was to be transformed into an 850-bed hotel. Construction was halted once again after the main structure was completed. In 1985, the unfinished investment was transferred to the capital city of Warsaw. Due to the original color of the facade, the building was nicknamed the "Golden Skyscraper".

In April 1988, a contract for the completion of the construction was signed with the Yugoslav consortium Generalexport/Giposs. The contract value was $40.5 million. The copper-colored façade was replaced with an untinted reflective one, which on clear days reflects the blue sky (hence the current name). It was the first façade made of reflective float glass in Warsaw.

The work was completed in 1991. The skyscraper is 120 meters high (including antenna masts) and has 27 above-ground storeys.

Three floors of the skyscraper were handed over to the Jewish Community of Warsaw. The Great Synagogue is commemorated by an MSI plaque placed on the façade facing Tłomackie Street.

The work resumed in the late 1960s and 1970s and was completed in 1981. The project was modified by a Belgrade-based company, replacing the copper-coloured facade with colourless reflective material, which gives a clear reflection of the sky (hence the current name, due to the building being blue during sunny weather). The skyscraper is 120 meters high and has 28 stories. Prominent former tenants include Peugeot and Sony. Both of these companies previously installed large signs on the building, which have since been taken down.

=== The "curse" of the Rabbis ===
The record-breakingly long construction time was explained by a curse allegedly placed by Warsaw rabbis on the construction of a skyscraper on the site of the demolished Great Synagogue. The history of the construction is depicted in the 1985 film I Stand Therefore I Am, starring Wiesław Drzewicz as the narrator, speaking in the first person on behalf of the skyscraper.

== Gallery ==
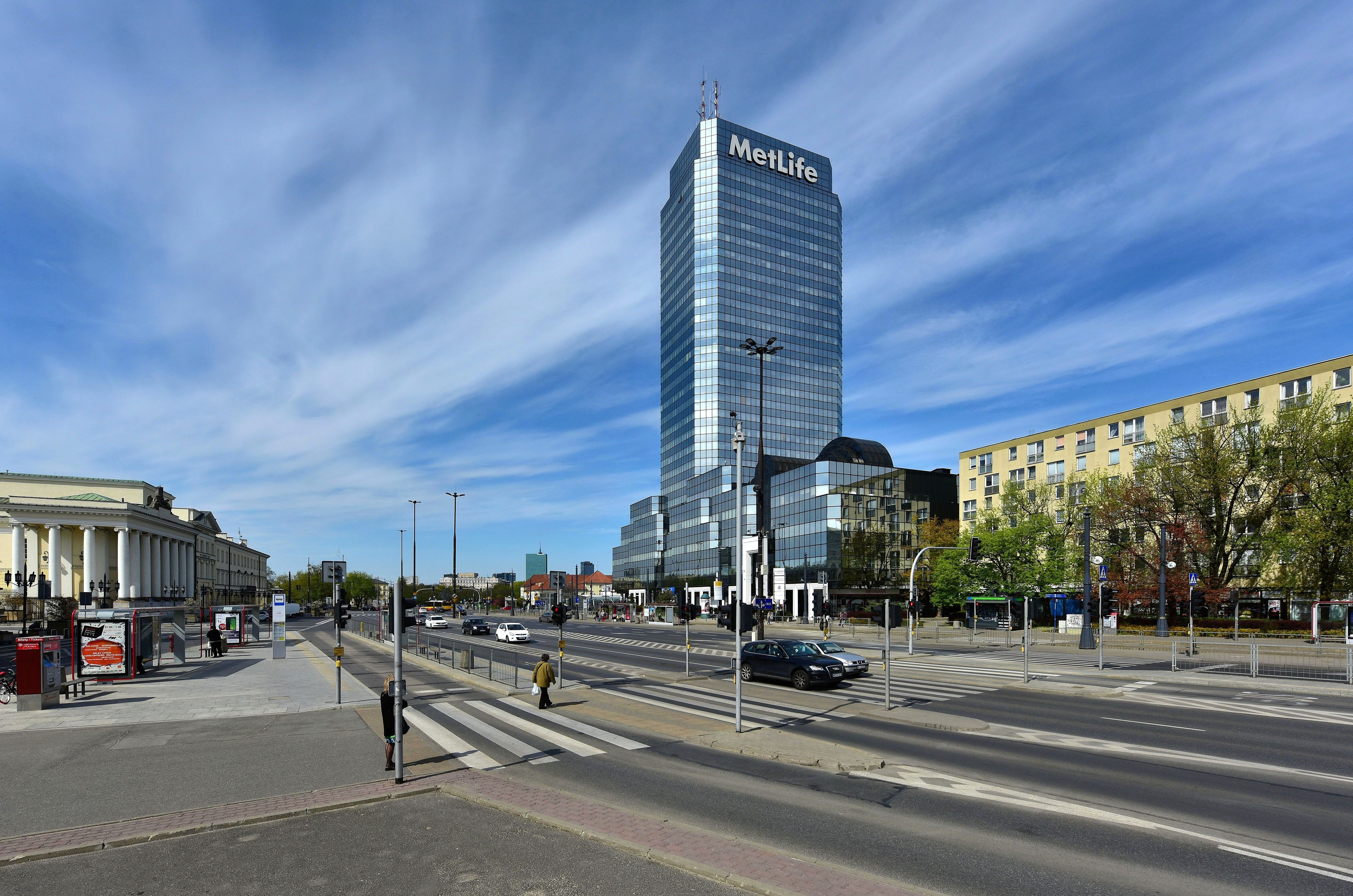
The tower seen from the Bankowy Square in 2018

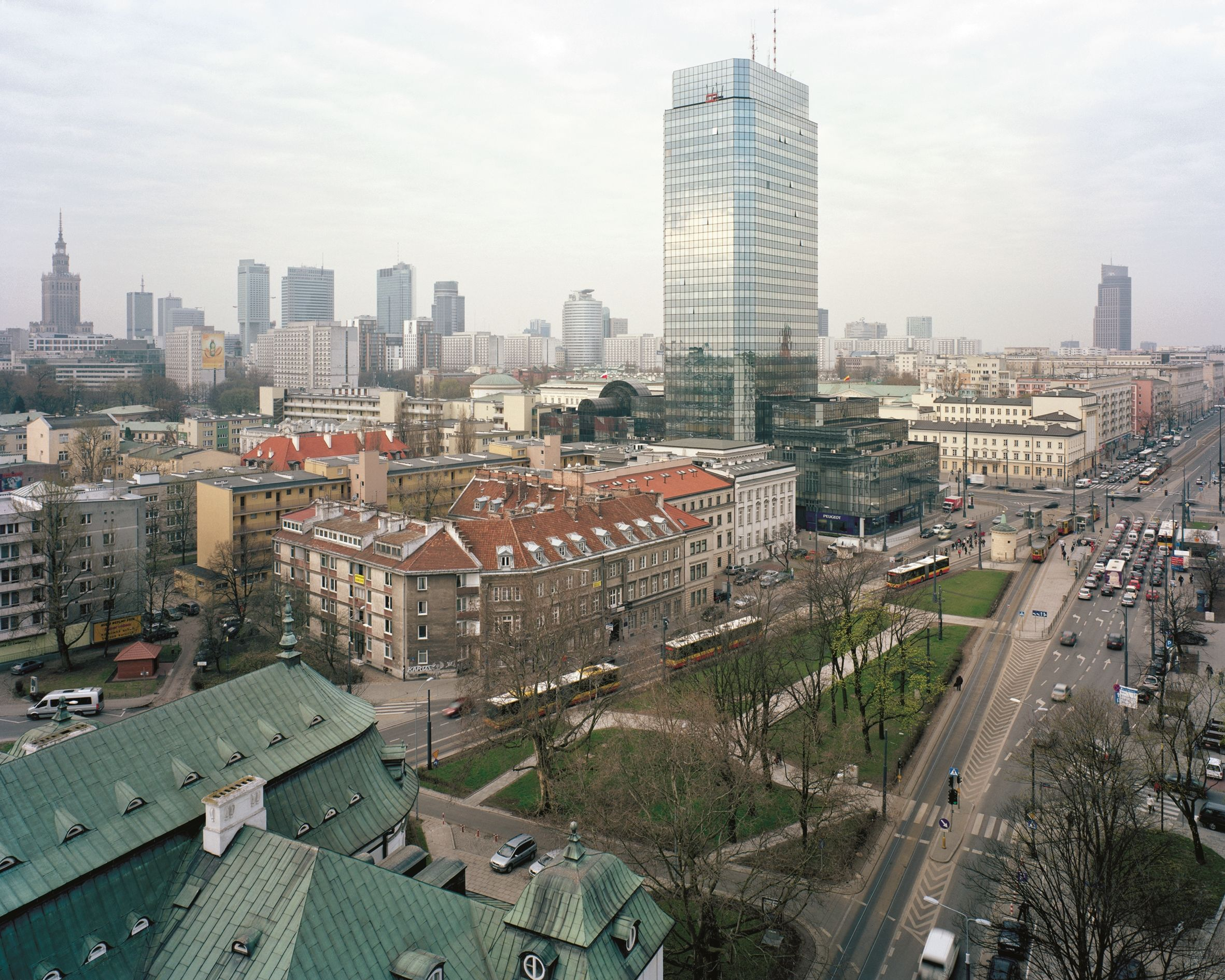
View from the north-east

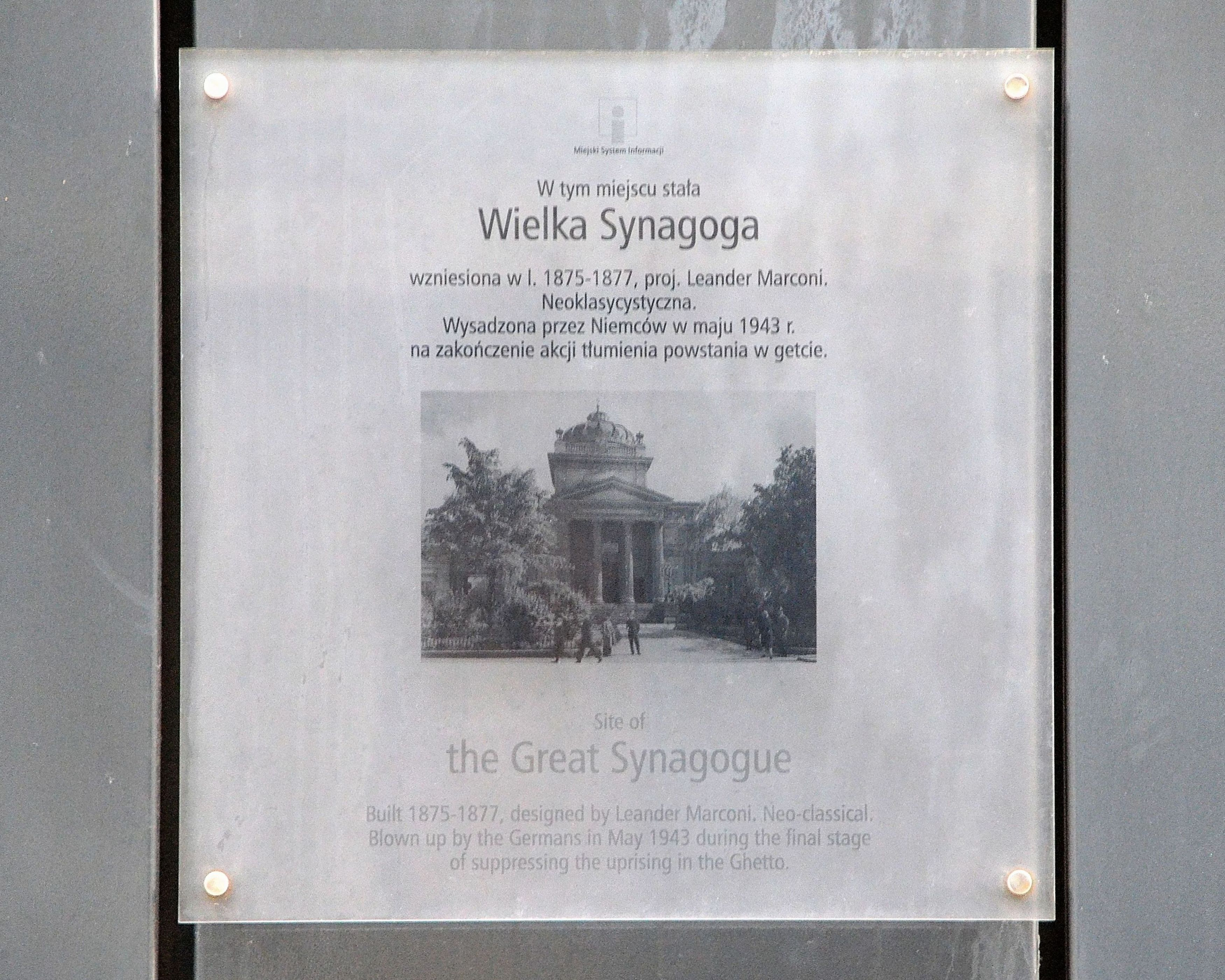
City Information System (MSI) plaque commemorating the Great Synagogue

== See also ==
- List of tallest buildings in Poland

== Sources ==
- Fuchs, Jana (2016). Miejsce po Wielkiej Synagodze (in Polish). Warszawa: Żydowski Instytut Historyczny. ISBN 978-83-65254-08-5.
