= Pinkes =

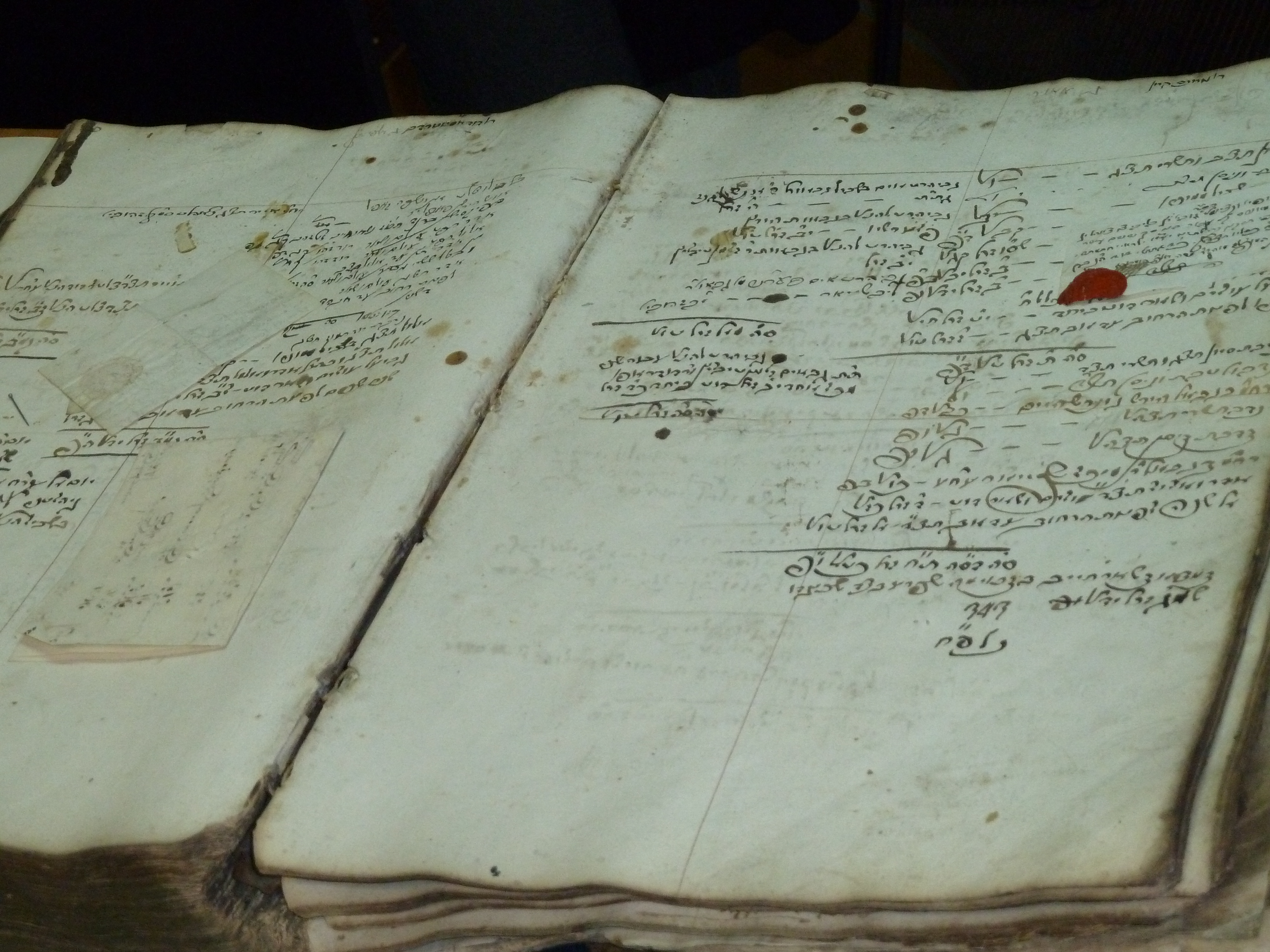
Pinkes of the Jewish community of Frankfurt an der Oder

A pinkes (Yiddish: פּינקס, plural פּינקסים pinkeysim; Hebrew: פִּנְקֵס, also pinkas, פִּנְקָס, plural פִּנְקָסִים pinkasim) is the ledger of a Jewish community, in which the proceedings of and events relating to the community are recorded. Such record book were used to co-ordinate and document organizations in Jewish towns and villages throughout the early modern period in Europe.

== Origin ==
The term pinkes is derived from the Greek word πίναξ, meaning a board or writing-tablet. It originally referred to a physical writing-tablet, as described in the Mishnah, which came in three types:

1. A tablet covered with dust, primarily used for arithmetical calculations, and large enough to serve as a seat;
2. A tablet covered with a layer of wax, where writing was done using a stylus; and
3. A smooth tablet written upon with ink.

Over time, the term evolved to refer to a book composed of such tablets, and eventually any written record. The use of "pinkes" to denote a register is found in the Mishnah: "The pinkes is open, and the hand writes."
