= Great Synagogue (Warsaw) =

Destroyed synagogue in Warsaw, Poland

Great Synagogue of Warsaw
- Polish: Wielka Synagoga w Warszawie
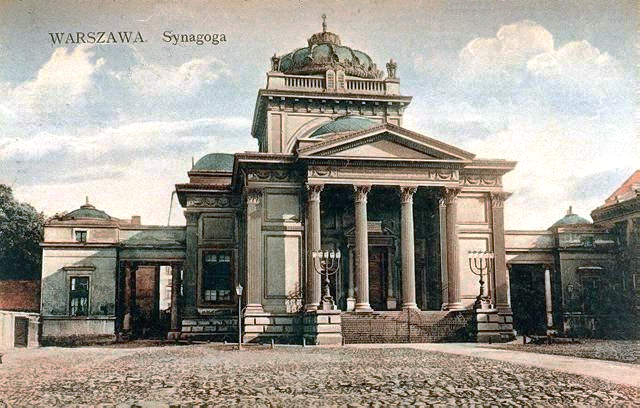
- The former synagogue, in the 1910s

- Location of the destroyed synagogue in Masovian Voivodeship

Religion
- Affiliation: Reform Judaism (former)
- Rite: Nusach Ashkenaz
- Ecclesiastical or organizational status: Synagogue (1878–1943)
- Status: Destroyed

Location
- Location: Tłomackie street, Warsaw, Masovian Voivodeship
- Country: Poland
- Interactive map of Great Synagogue of Warsaw
- Coordinates: 52°14′41″N 21°00′09″E

Architecture
- Architect: Leandro Marconi
- Type: Synagogue architecture
- Style: Neoclassical
- Groundbreaking: 1875
- Completed: 1878
- Destroyed: May 16, 1943
- Materials: Brick

The Great Synagogue of Warsaw (Polish: Wielka Synagoga w Warszawie) was a former Orthodox Jewish congregation and synagogue, that was located on Tłomackie street, in Warsaw, in the Masovian Voivodeship of Poland. Designed by Leandro Marconi and completed in the Neoclassical style in 1878, at the time of its opening, it was the largest Jewish house of worship in the world. The grand synagogue served as a house of prayer until World War II when it was destroyed by Nazis on May 16, 1943.

== History ==
The Great Synagogue was built by the Warsaw's Jewish community between 1875 and 1878 at Tłomackie street, in the south-eastern tip of the district in which the Jews were allowed to settle by the Russian Imperial authorities of Congress Poland. The main architect was Leandro Marconi. It was opened on 26 September 1878 in celebration of Rosh Hashanah.

The synagogue served the acculturated members of Warsaw's Jewish population. Like other such prayer houses in Central and Eastern Europe, its worship was conducted in a relatively modernized fashion, although it did not approach ideological religious reform. Sermons were delivered in Polish rather than Yiddish, an all-male choir accompanied the service, and an organ had been installed, which played only at weddings. Liturgy and other principled issues remained wholly untouched.

After the Warsaw Ghetto Uprising, on May 16, 1943, the SS blew up the building. It was not rebuilt after the war, when few Jews remained or returned to Warsaw after the Holocaust by the Nazis.

It was blown up personally by SS-Gruppenführer Jürgen Stroop on 16 May 1943. This was the last act of destruction by the Germans in suppressing the Revolt of the Jewish ghetto in Warsaw. Stroop later recalled:

"What a marvelous sight it was. A fantastic piece of theater. My staff and I stood at a distance. I held the electrical device which would detonate all the charges simultaneously. Jesuiter called for silence. I glanced over at my brave officers and men, tired and dirty, silhouetted against the glow of the burning buildings. After prolonging the suspense for a moment, I shouted: 'Heil Hitler' and pressed the button. With a thunderous, deafening bang and a rainbow burst of colors, the fiery explosion soared toward the clouds, an unforgettable tribute to our triumph over the Jews. The Warsaw Ghetto was no more. The will of Adolf Hitler and Heinrich Himmler had been done."

— interview conducted by Kazimierz Moczarski, 1981

Since the 1980s, the site was redeveloped for construction of a large skyscraper, devoted mostly to office space. It was once known as the Golden Skyscraper and is currently commonly referred to as the Blue Skyscraper (Polish: Błękitny Wieżowiec).

A scale model of the Great Synagogue is displayed in an exhibit at the POLIN Museum of the History of Polish Jews.

== Gallery ==
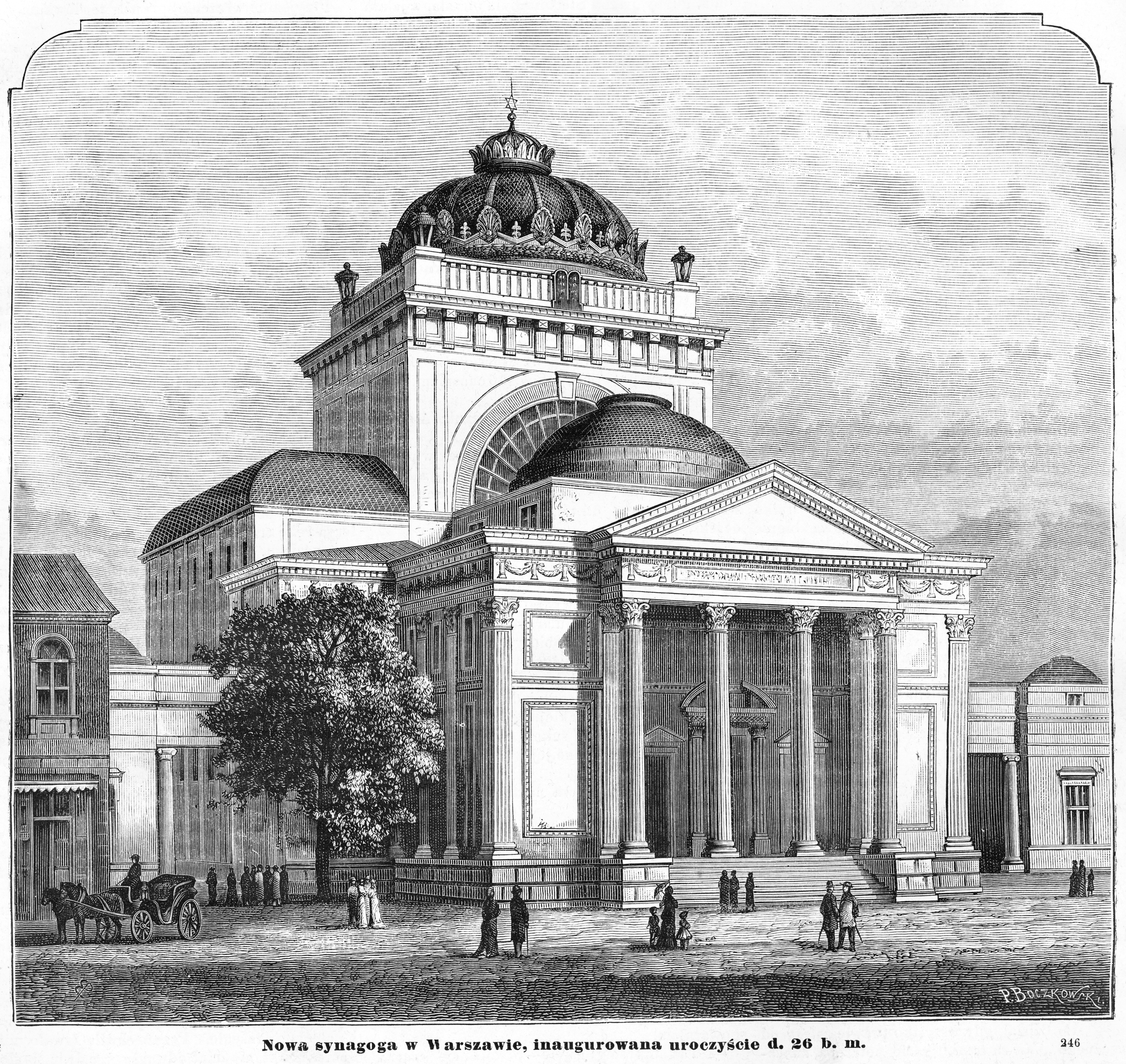
Synagogue just after it was built in 1878

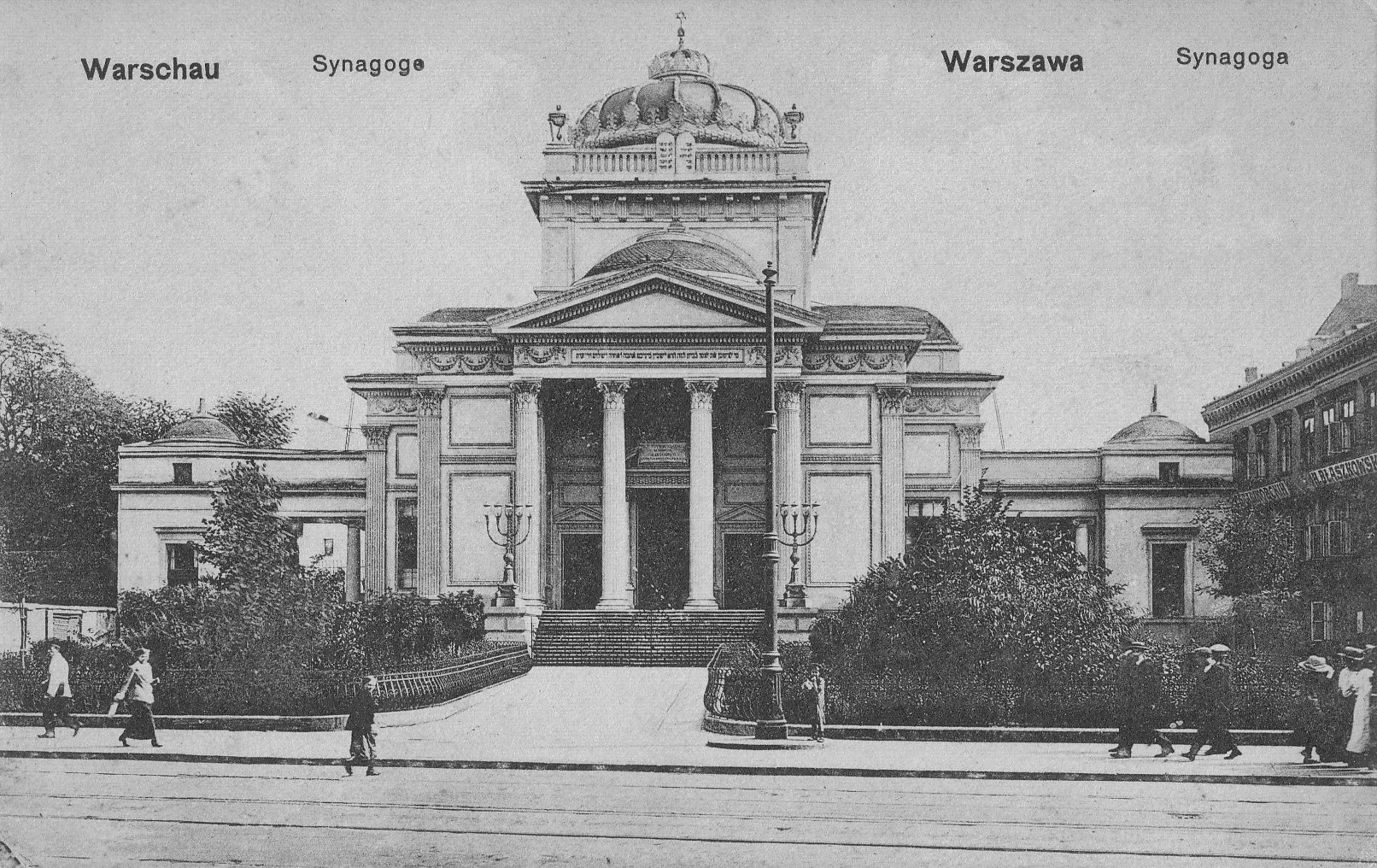
Photograph of the Great Synagogue, c. 1915

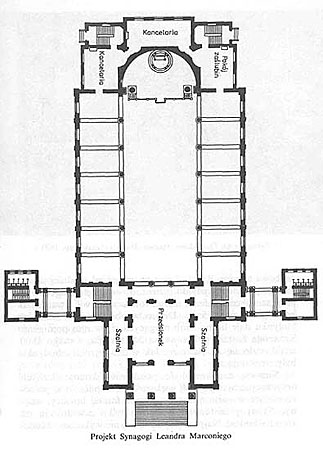
Plan of the structure

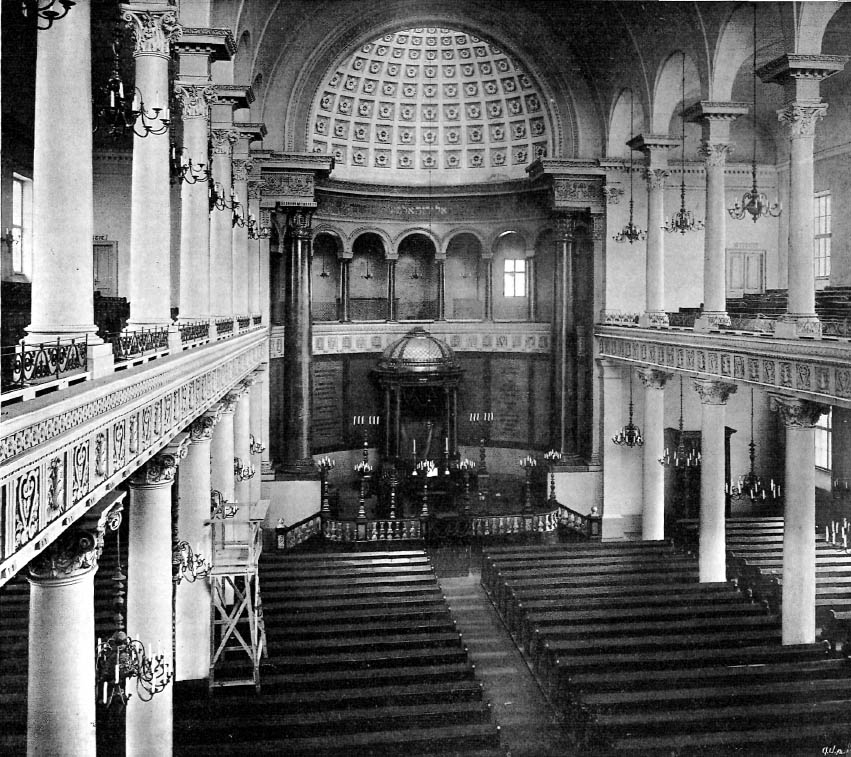
Interior

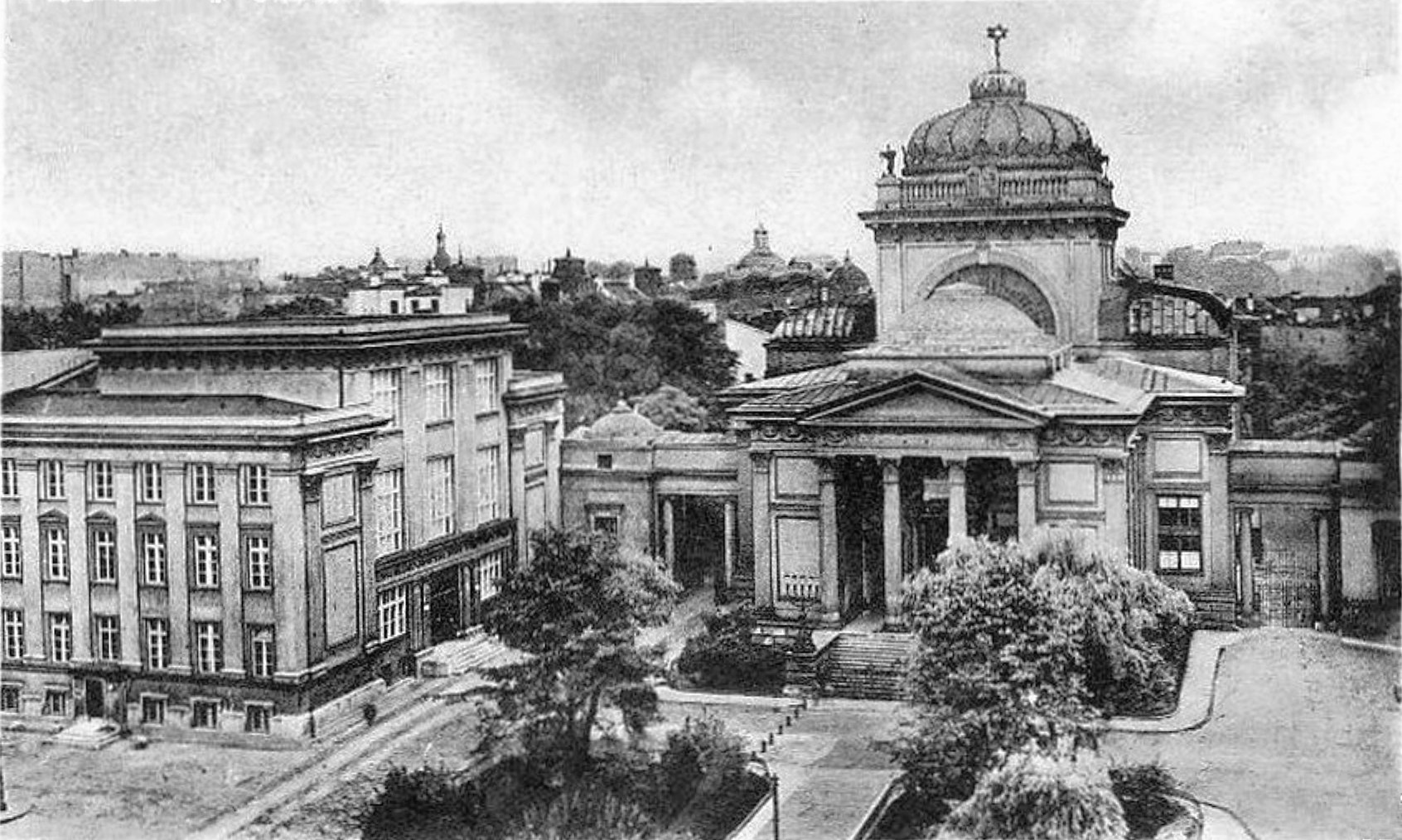
View from Tłomackie street

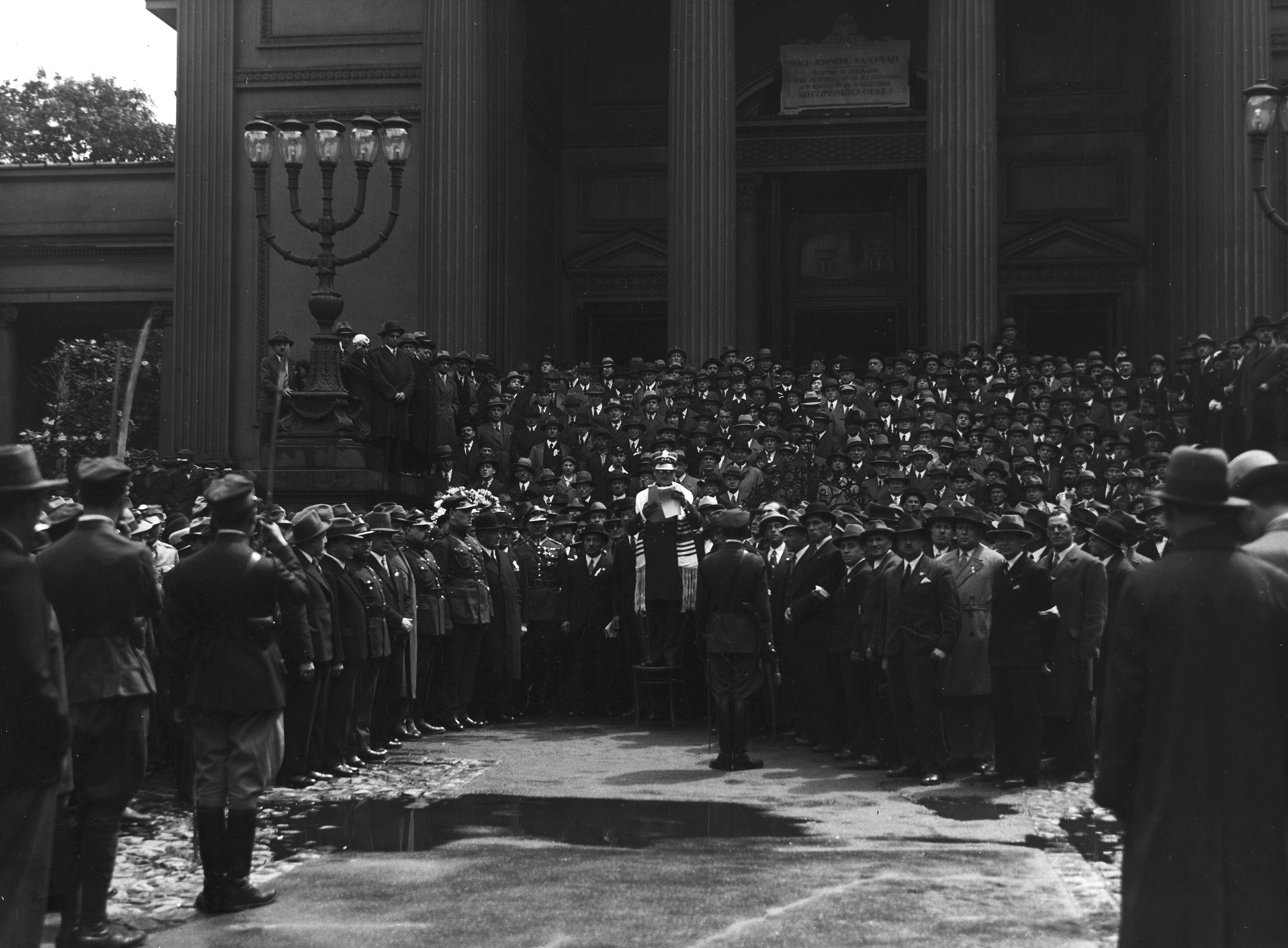
Rabbi Baruch Steinberg speaking before Great Synagogue (1933), reading roll call of the fallen, organized by Union of Jewish Fighters for Polish Independence

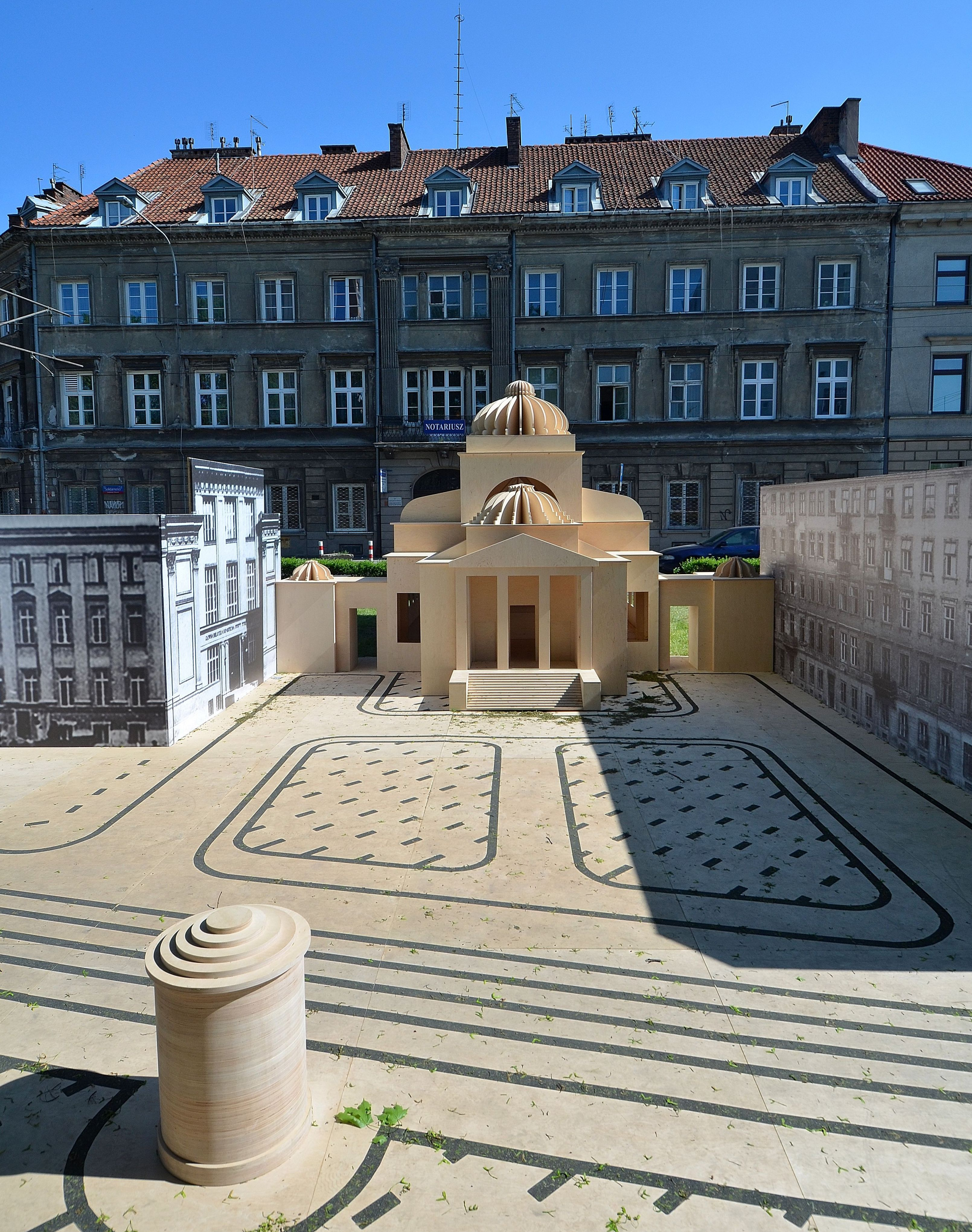
Replica of the synagogue built in Warsaw to mark 70th anniversary of its destruction (2013)

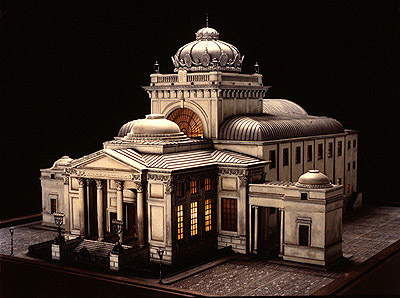
Model of synagogue in Anu – Museum of the Jewish People, Tel-Aviv

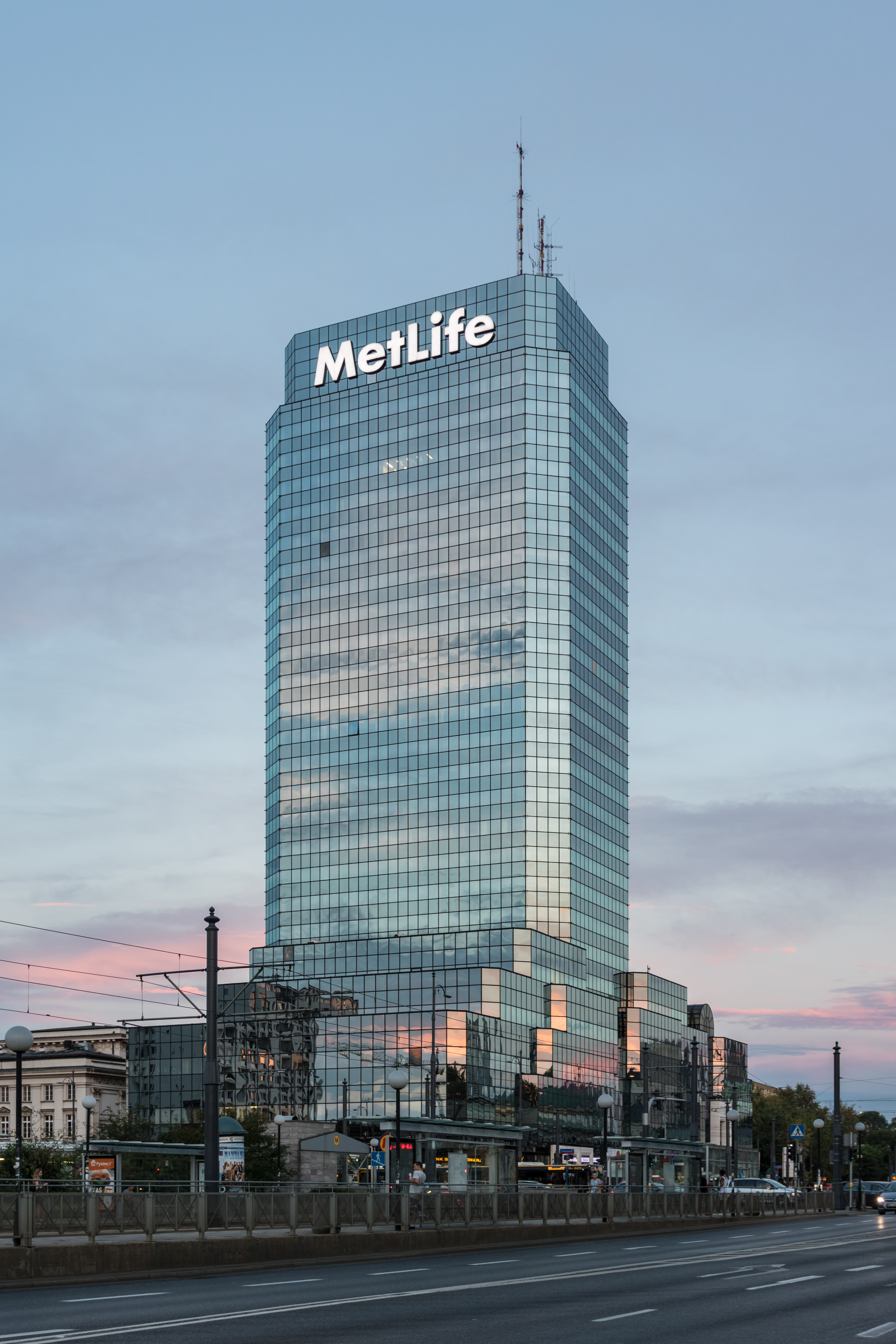
Former site of the synagogue, the Blue Skyscraper

== See also ==
- Chronology of Jewish Polish history
- History of the Jews in Poland
- List of active synagogues in Poland
- Moses Schorr
