= Tłomackie Street, Warsaw =

Street in Warsaw

Coordinates: 52°14′39″N 21°00′10″E

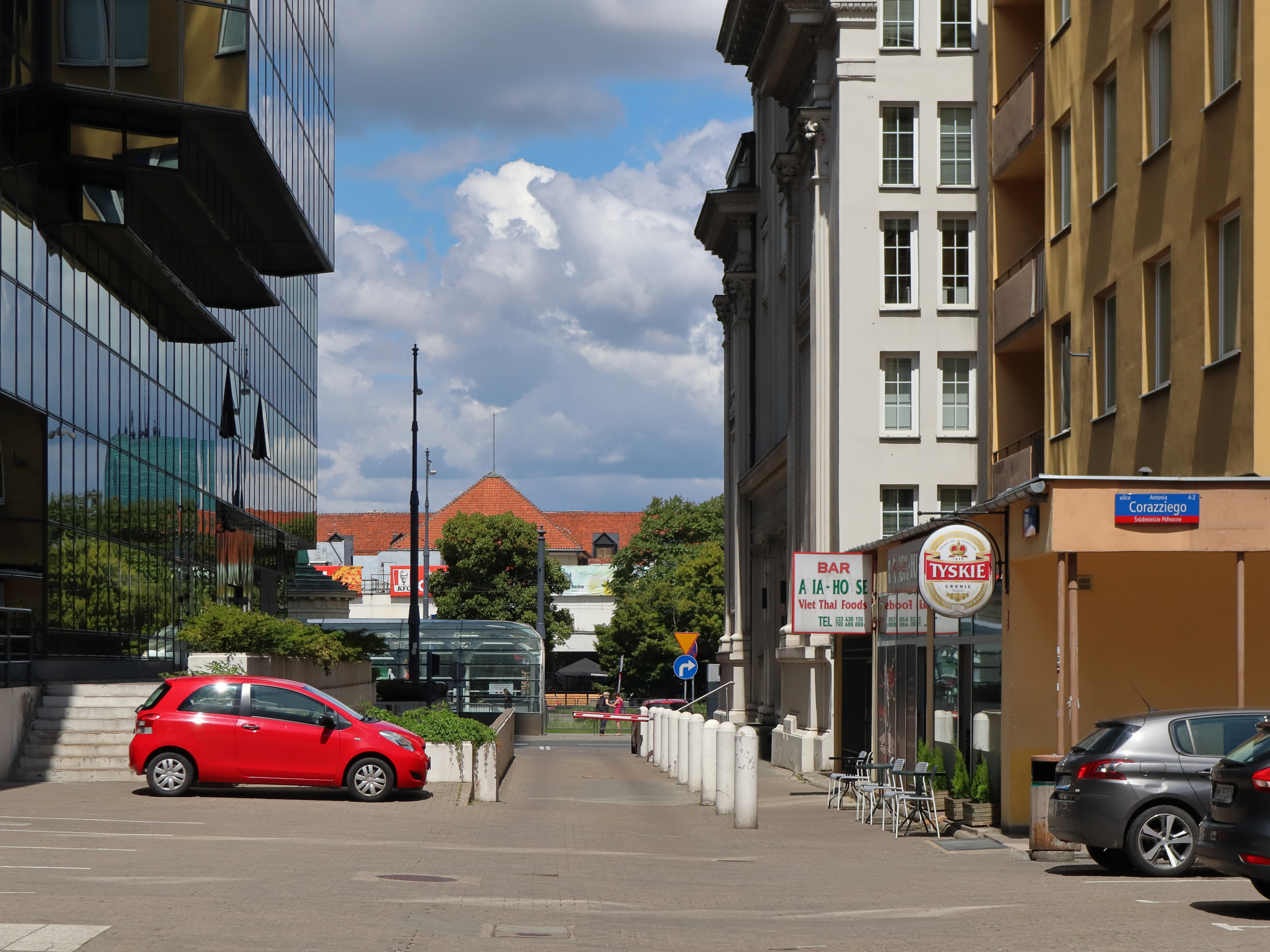
Tłomackie Street

Tłomackie is a small street in Warsaw, Poland, in the area of Śródmieście, next to Plac Bankowy. Initially a small village square of the settlement of the same name, with time it was incorporated into the city of Warsaw and retained its traditional name.

Among its most notable buildings was the monumental Great Synagogue. Blown up by the Germans in the aftermath of the Warsaw Ghetto Uprising during World War II, the Great Synagogue was not rebuilt after the war. The square itself was reduced to a tiny street with only one building, while the rest of the former square has been taken over by al. Solidarności (street) and the Blue Skyscraper (Błękitny Wieżowiec).
