= Jezuicka Street, Bydgoszcz =

Street in Bydgoszcz, Poland

Coordinates: 53°07′19″N 17°59′55″E

Jezuicka Street
Bydgoszcz
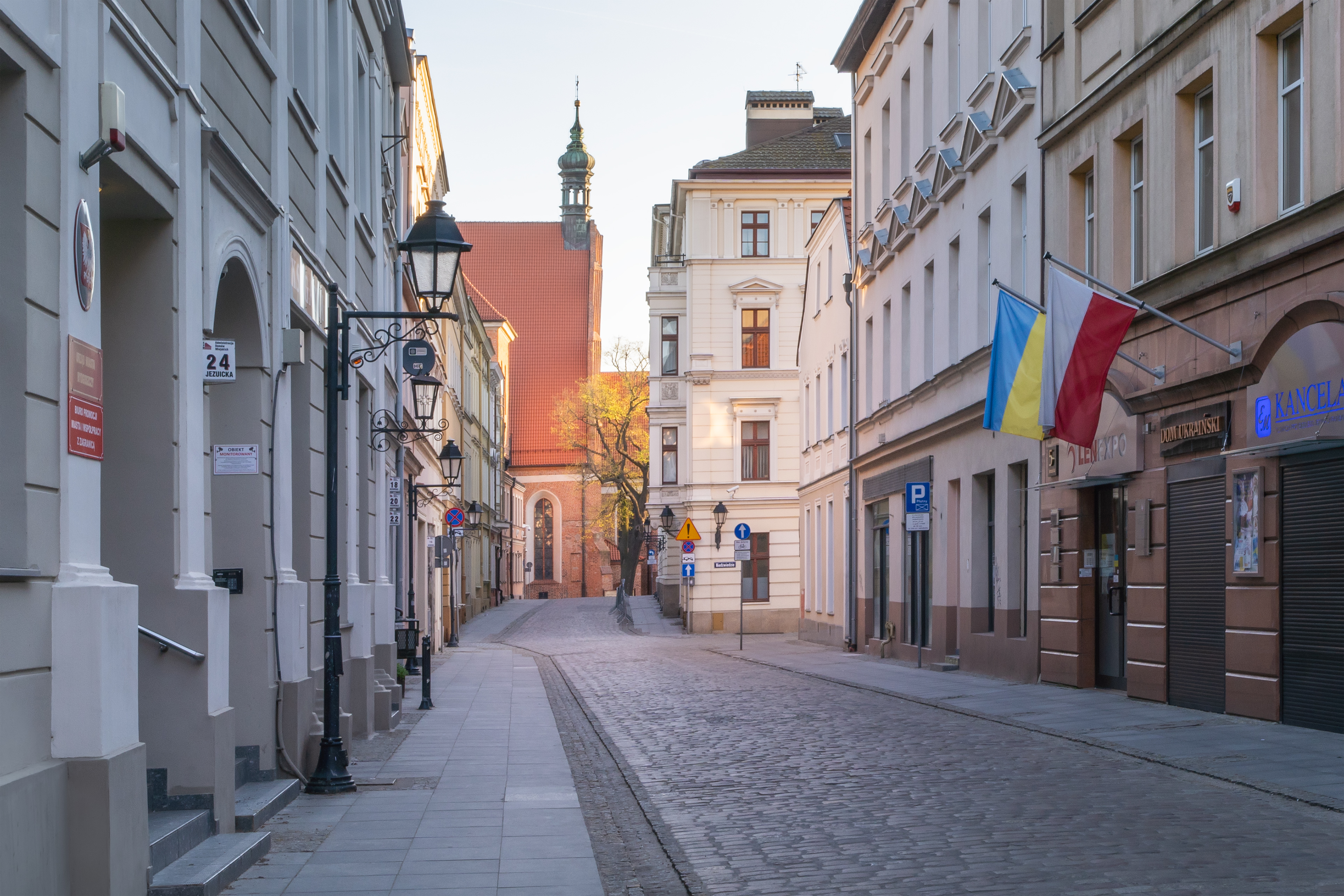
- View to the north

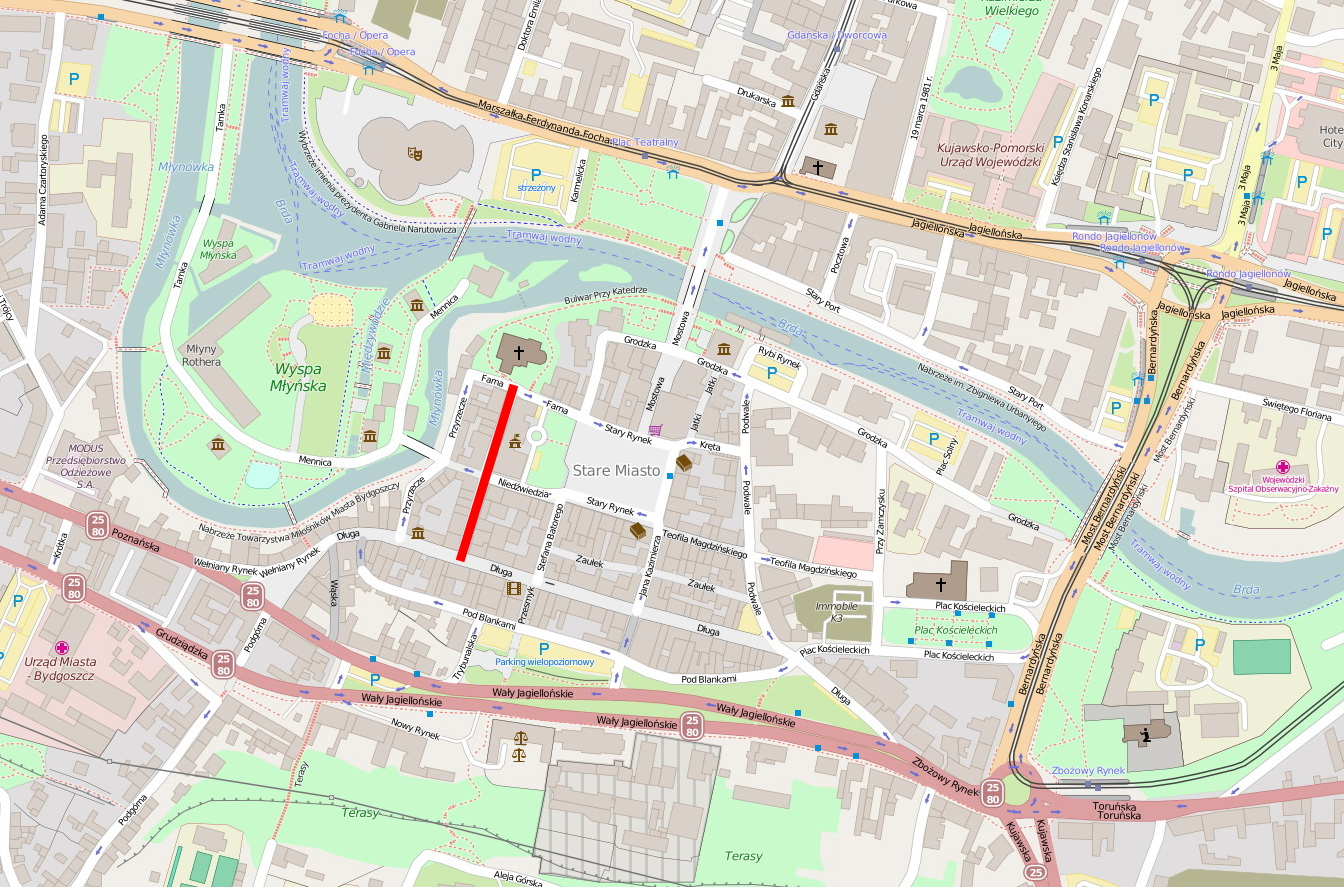
- Location of the street in Bydgoszcz
- Native name: Ulica Jezuicka w Bydgoszczy (Polish)
- Former name: Pfarr Kirchenstraße – Neue Pfarrstraße
- Part of: Bydgoszcz
- Namesake: Society of Jesus
- Owner: City of Bydgoszcz
- Length: 150 m (490 ft)
- Area: Old Town
- Location: Bydgoszcz, Poland

Jezuicka Street is a street located in Bydgoszcz, Poland. Many of its buildings are either registered on Kuyavian-Pomeranian Voivodeship heritage list, or part of Bydgoszcz local history.

== Location ==
The street lies in the western part of the Old Town. It connects Długa street and Farna street, where stands Bydgoszcz cathedral, following along a north–south path. It is 150 m long.

== History ==
Jezuicka street was laid out in the middle of the 14th century, when Bydgoszcz Old Town network was established. It ran in the western part of the city, connecting Długa Street and St. Martin and St. Nicholas Cathedral.

Rescue archaeological works have revealed the presence in the street of fragments of brick dating back to the 15th century. The house at Nr.4 still keeps preserved walls from this period, while foundations from the 17th century have been found at Nr.5.

The history of this part of the city is related to the Order of the Jesuits, which owned a majority of the dwellings located between today's Farna, Jezuicka, Niedźwiedzia streets and the Old Market Square. In 1619, the Society of Jesus erected a monastery here and around 1640, the construction of two Jesuit buildings on the Market Square closed one side of this quadrangle area:

- St Ignatius of Loyola Church (Polish: Kościół pojezuicki pw. św. Ignacego Loyoli);
- Jesuit College (Polish: Kolegium Jezuitów w Bydgoszczy).

During the Swedish Invasions (1660), most of the buildings were burned down, and many others were emptied by their inhabitants before the plague. Properties were then managed by churches, monasteries and hospitals: they were then called tagged as Jesuit.

In autumn 1657, visiting monarques John II Casimir and his wife, together with Frederick William, Elector of Brandenburg and Duke of Prussia, their dignitaries and courtiers, were housed in the Jesuit College and the Jesuit-owned houses nearby.

On the first detailed plan of Bromberg, drawn in 1774 by Prussian geometer Greth, a number of empty plots are visible in Jezuicka Street: only existing houses were located in the central and western part of the street and in the eastern frontage (today's City Hall). Many tenements were erected in the last quarter of the 18th century, as shown on Lindner's map in 1800 and a city map of 1816. It has been reported that between 1772 and 1786, 99 new 2-storey houses were built in Bydgoszcz. From the cadastral plan of 1876, it appears that there are 19 tenements at Jezuicka street, of which 13 located on the western frontage, which survived until today.

In the 1920s, the house numbering of the street was ordered back to the Polish system, while Polish and Jewish population, including several bakers and shoemakers, lived here. During the German occupation of Poland, the inhabitants of Jezuicka street were the first victims of the riots of the Old Town in the early days of Nazi occupation of Bydgoszcz.

After World War II and for several decades, the street kept the character acquired from the middle of the 19th century. In 1979, a renovation work started in the area, so as to order the old buildings of the Old Town, leading in the 1990s to the overhaul of most of the tenements at Jezuicka Street. Today they house bookshops, restaurants, shops, art galleries and in particular:

- The Association of friends of Bydgoszcz City (Polish: Towarzystwo Miłośników Miasta Bydgoszczy) at Nr.4 and 18;
- The Bydgoszcz Scientific Society (Polish: Bydgoskie Towarzystwo Naukowe) at Nr.4;
- City Hall offices at Nr.4a and 14.

In the 2010, street pavement has been renewed, as part of the Revitalization Plan of Bydgoszcz.

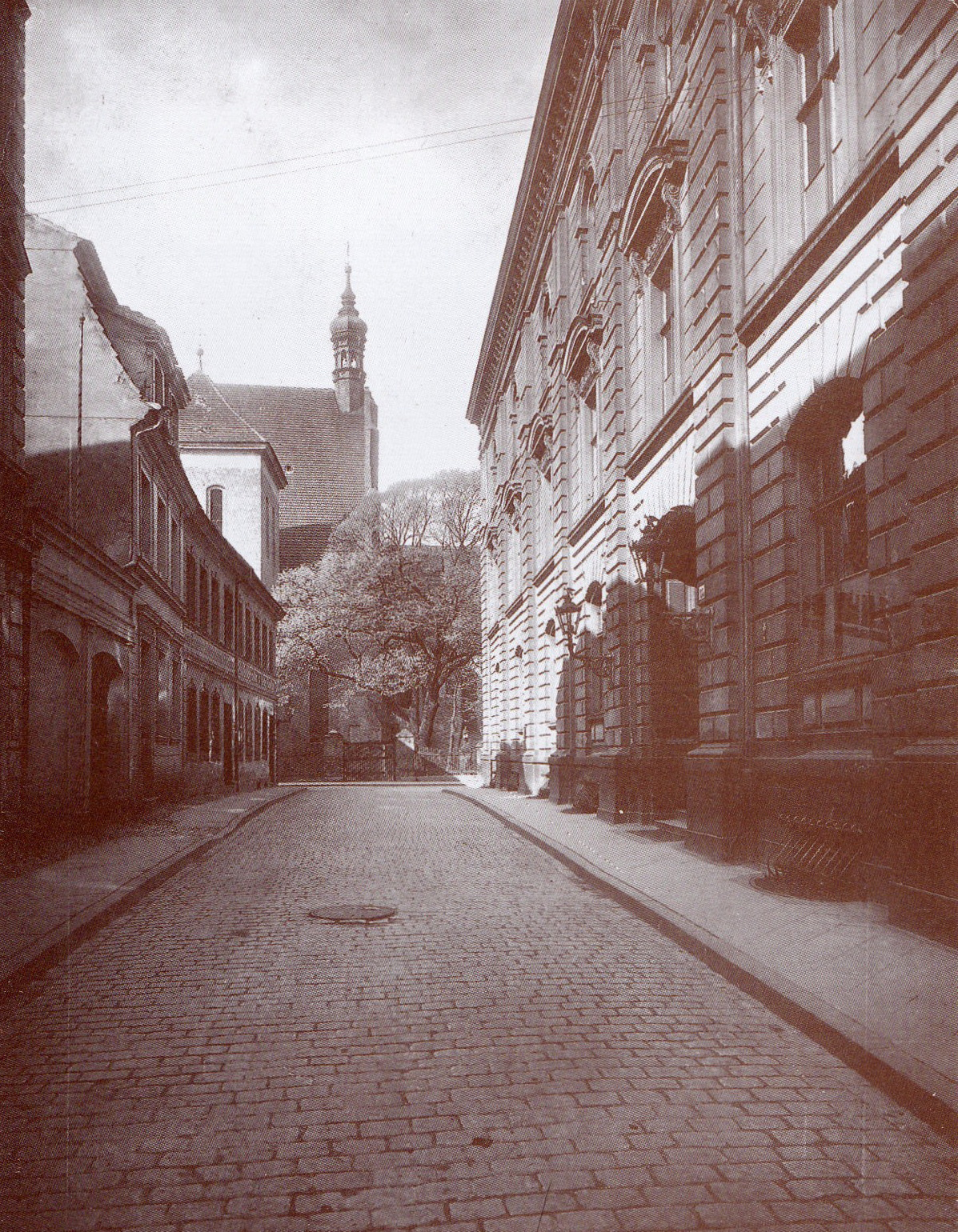
The street ca 1905

=== Naming ===
Through history, the street bore the following names:

- 16th century to first half of the 18th century, – Platea ecclesiastica (Latin, Church street), since the alley led from Długa street to the cathedral;
- 1800–1816, Pfarr Kirchenstraße (German, Parish Church Street);
- 1840–1920, Neue Pfarrstraße (German, New Parish Street);
- 1920–1939, Ulica Jezuicka (Jesuit street);
- 1939–1945, Neue Pfarrstraße;
- Since 1945, Ulica Jezuicka.

Current namesake refers to the Society of Jesus, which erected in the area a monastery (1619), a church (1638) and a college (1648). The place was the most important educational and cultural institution in the 17th century in Bydgoszcz.

== Main places and buildings ==
Jesuicka Street is one of the most beautiful buildings in the Old Town of Bydgoszcz. The old tenements, despite multiple reconstructions, boast Polish Baroque architecture features. Most edifices, however, date back to the 19th century: 20th century series of renovations partially depleted facade architectural details. The oldest and most distinctive building on Jezuicka Street houses today the City Hall (Polish: Ratusz).

Bydgoszcz City Hall, at 1

Registered on Kuyavian-Pomeranian Voivodeship Heritage list, Nr.601359 Reg. A/783 (May 6, 1992)

1644–1653

Neoclassical architecture

The edifice was initially a Baroque architecture building housing the Jesuit College in Bydgoszcz. The institution was established by Bishop Kasper Działyński and Jerzy Ossoliński, Bydgoszcz Starostwo and Crown Chancellor. In the 17th century, there were apartments for Jesuits, a school with four to five classes, an alleyway adapted for school theater performances during school and church ceremonies, and a music hall for members of the school orchestra.

Main construction works were carried out from 1644 to 1653, under the direction of Jesuit builder Wojciech Przybyłkowicz. An expansion of the college was performed in 1696, thanks to funds donation made by Jan Stefan Komorowski, Malbork Regent, brother of Wojciech, then rector of Bydgoszcz Jesuit College (1689). Further constructions were carried out in the college between 1697 and 1709 under the direction of Wojciech Głaznowicz, the last major reconstruction happening in 1726–1740. Jesuit college and St Ignatius of Loyola Church composed one of the most magnificent ensemble in Bydgoszcz. It struck less by the level of decoration than the quality of its various important guests: John II Casimir and his wife, together with Frederick William and his spouse in 1657, officers and generals of the Swedish and Russian armies during armed conflicts in the 17th and 18th centuries.

After the Suppression of the Society of Jesus in 1773, the building was used as a Prussian Gymnasium. In the time of the Duchy of Warsaw, there was a Department of Primary School (1808–1812) and later a faculty (1812–1815) faculty. At that time, the school received the visit, among others, of Julian Ursyn Niemcewicz, Tadeusz Czacki; Stefan Florian Garczyński Polish poet and friend of Adam Mickiewicz studied there.

After the Third Partition of Poland (1795), a Prussian royal gymnasium was set up in the building (1871). In 1879, the ensemble was purchased by the municipality and became the seat of the city hall. To fit its need, municipal authorities ordered a reconstruction in 1878, supervised by building counselor Wilhelm Lincke, and helped by chief mason Albert Rose and chief carpenter Heinrich Mautz (who designed in 1845 Buchholz's tannery). Works remodeled the facade and adapted interiors layout to the needs of office activities. The opening ceremony took place on December 19, 1879.

As a result of the reconstructions made in 1697, 1702, and during the 19th century, the edifice has gradually lost its original Baroque architecture to display Neoclassical features. The two-storey construction is a brick, plastered edifice with basement. Some rooms are barrel vaulted. The Town Hall is the only preserved fragment of the former Jesuit complex. The monastery and the church have been demolished in 1940. From 1994 to 1996, a general refurbishment of the facility was carried out, including a modernization and expansion of the eastern wing. On April 19, 2017, a new town hall clock has been unveiled on the facade.

On the walls of the building are placed several plaques commemorating:

- On the northern side, the 600th anniversary of Bydgoszcz (1946);
- On the eastern side, the anniversary of the liberation of the city from German occupation (1950).
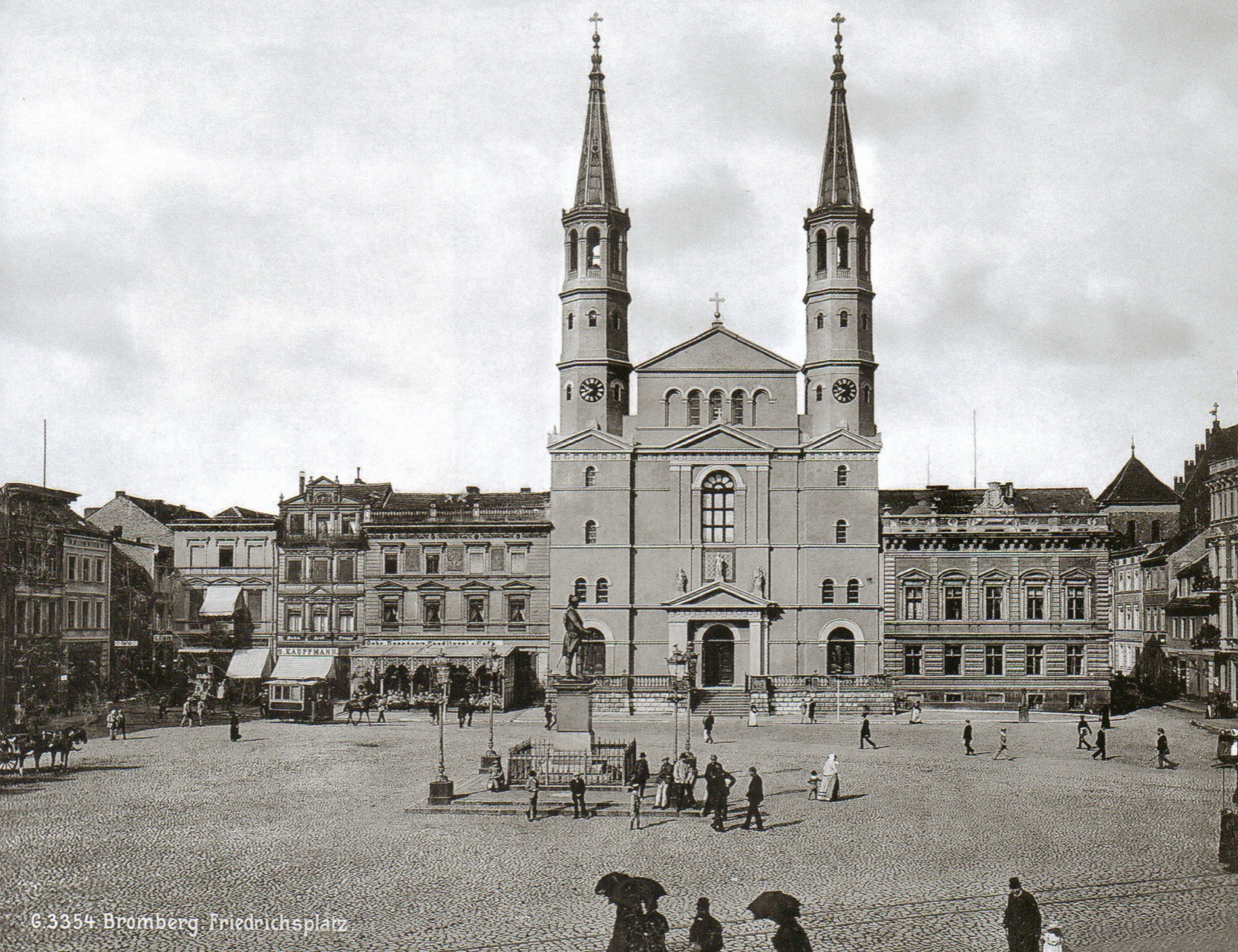
View of the Jesuit ensemble ca 1895

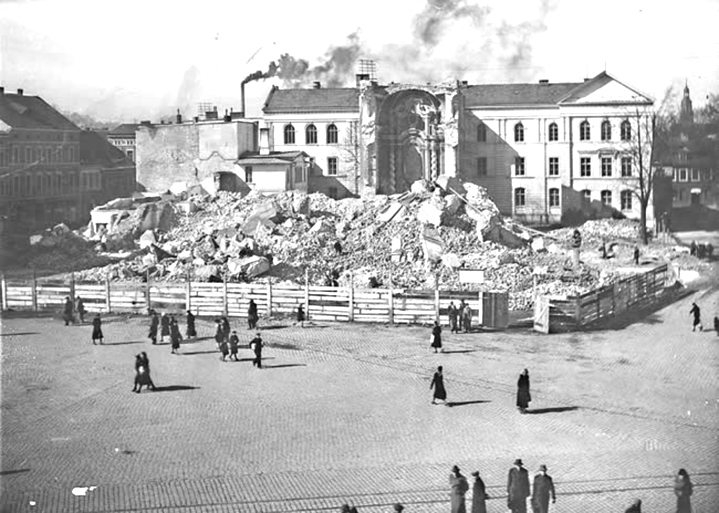
Ruins of the complex in 1940

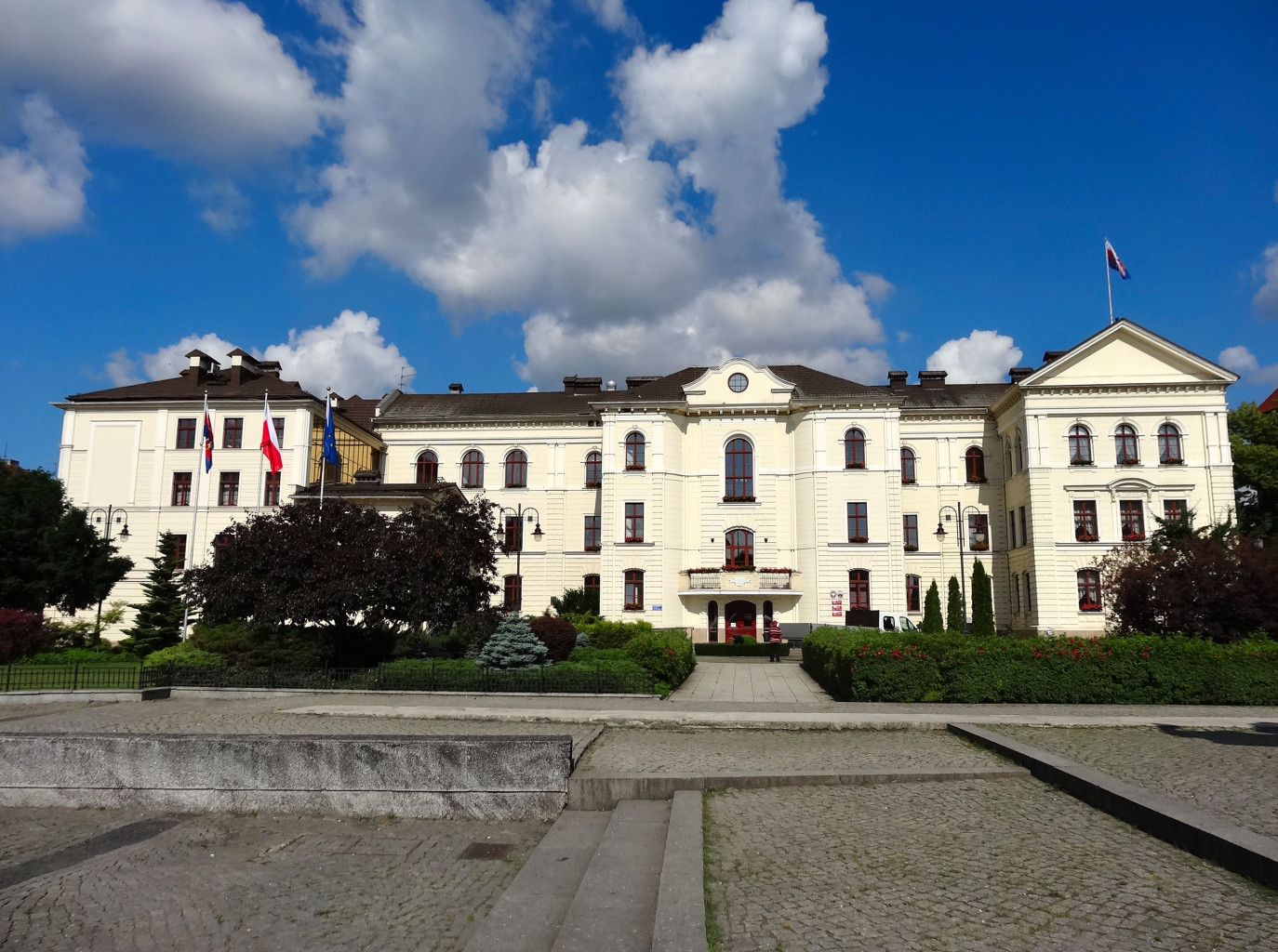
View from the Old Market Place

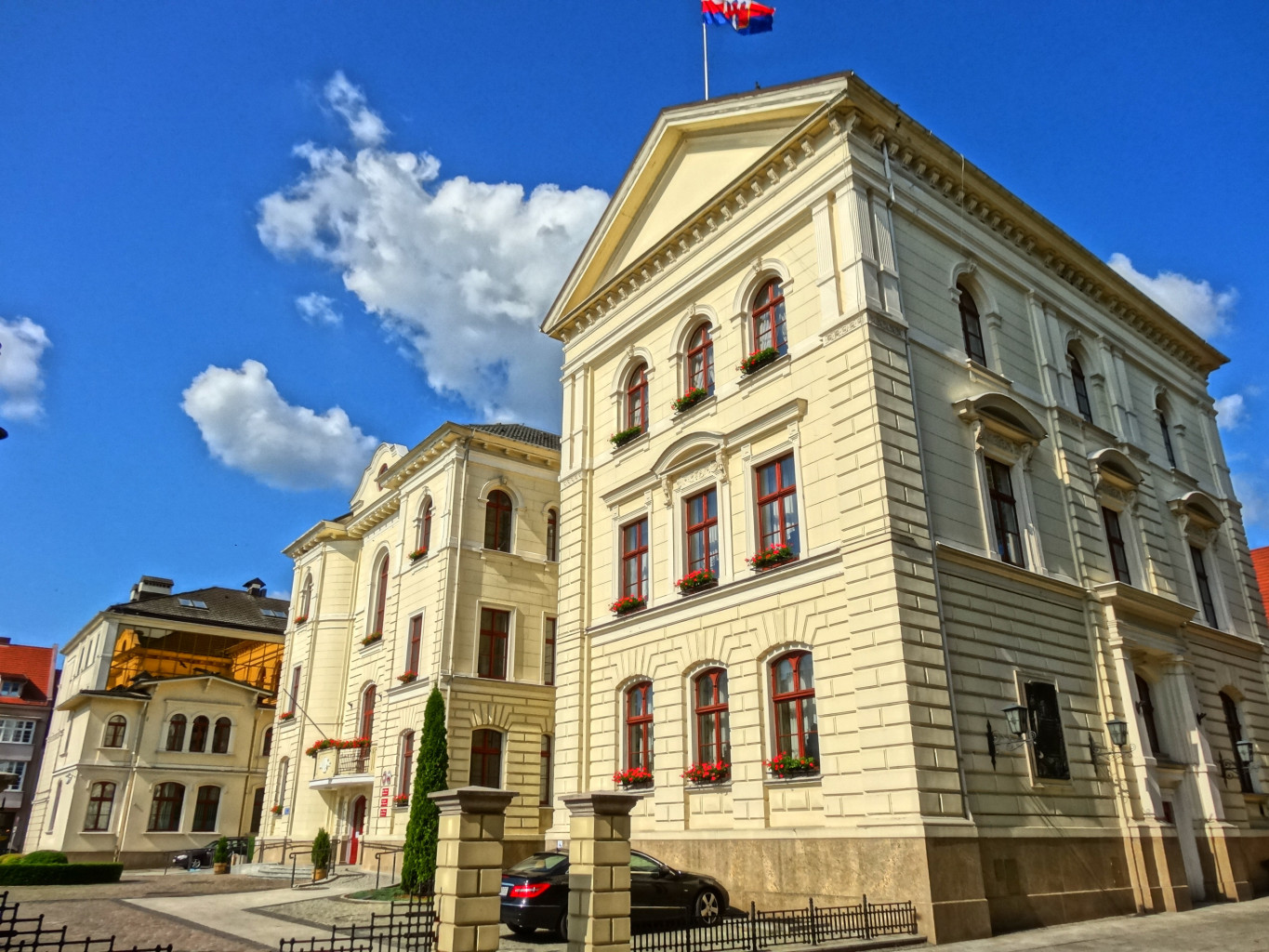
View in the back of the glassy renovated addition

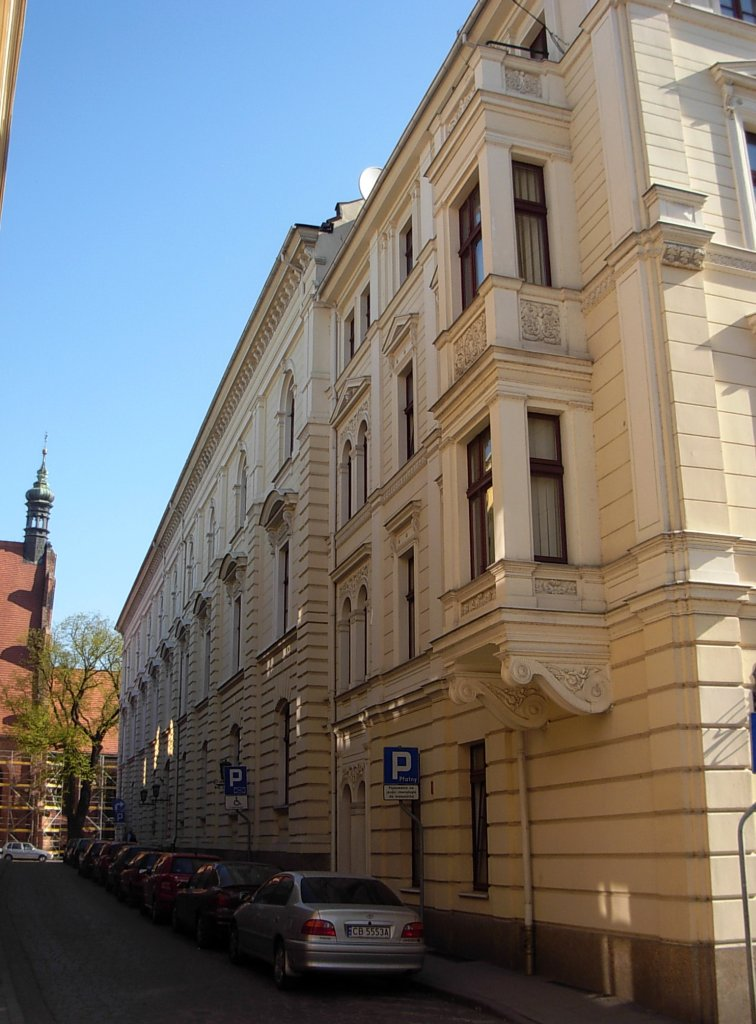
Facade on Jezuicka Street

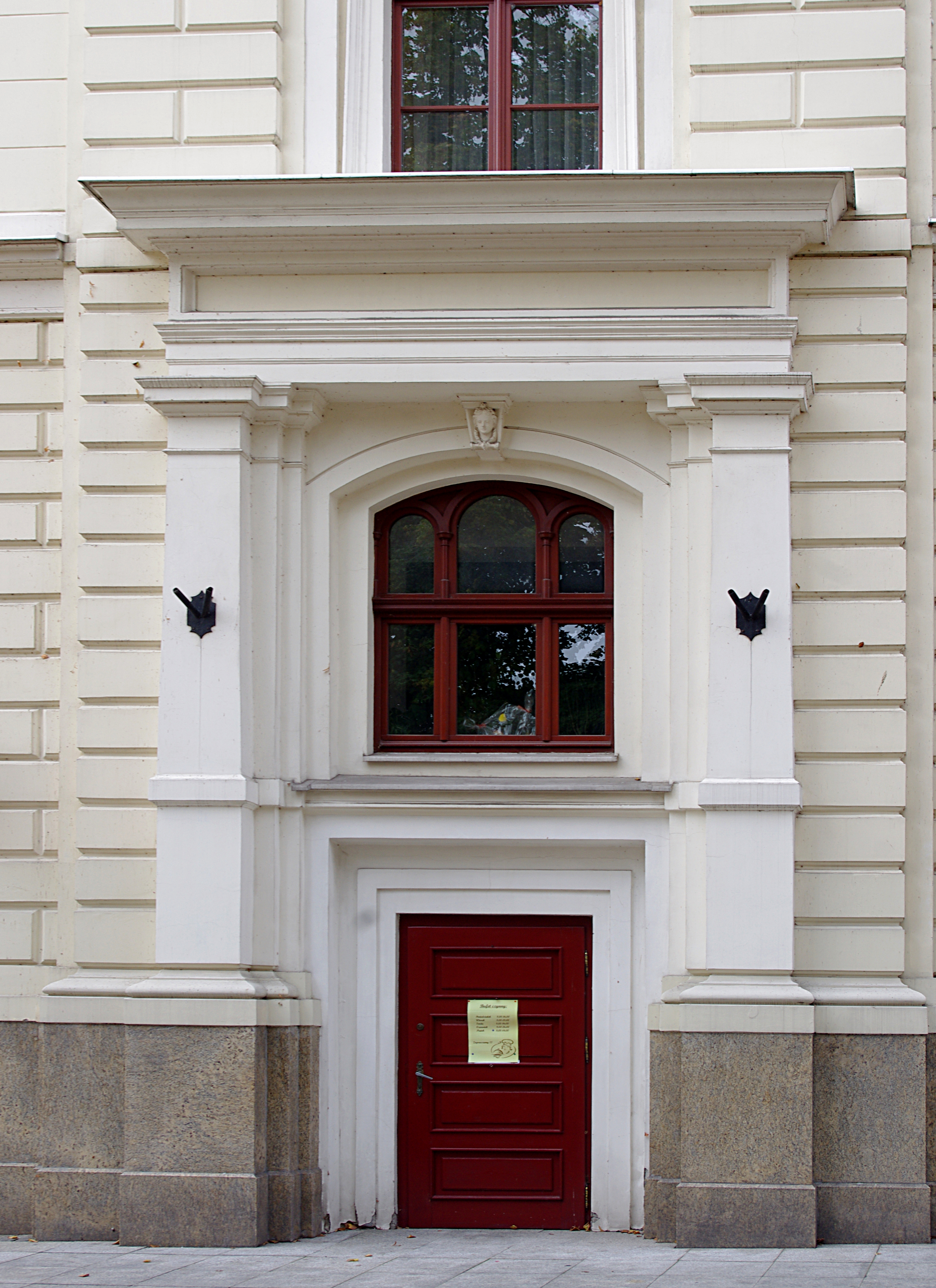
Portal

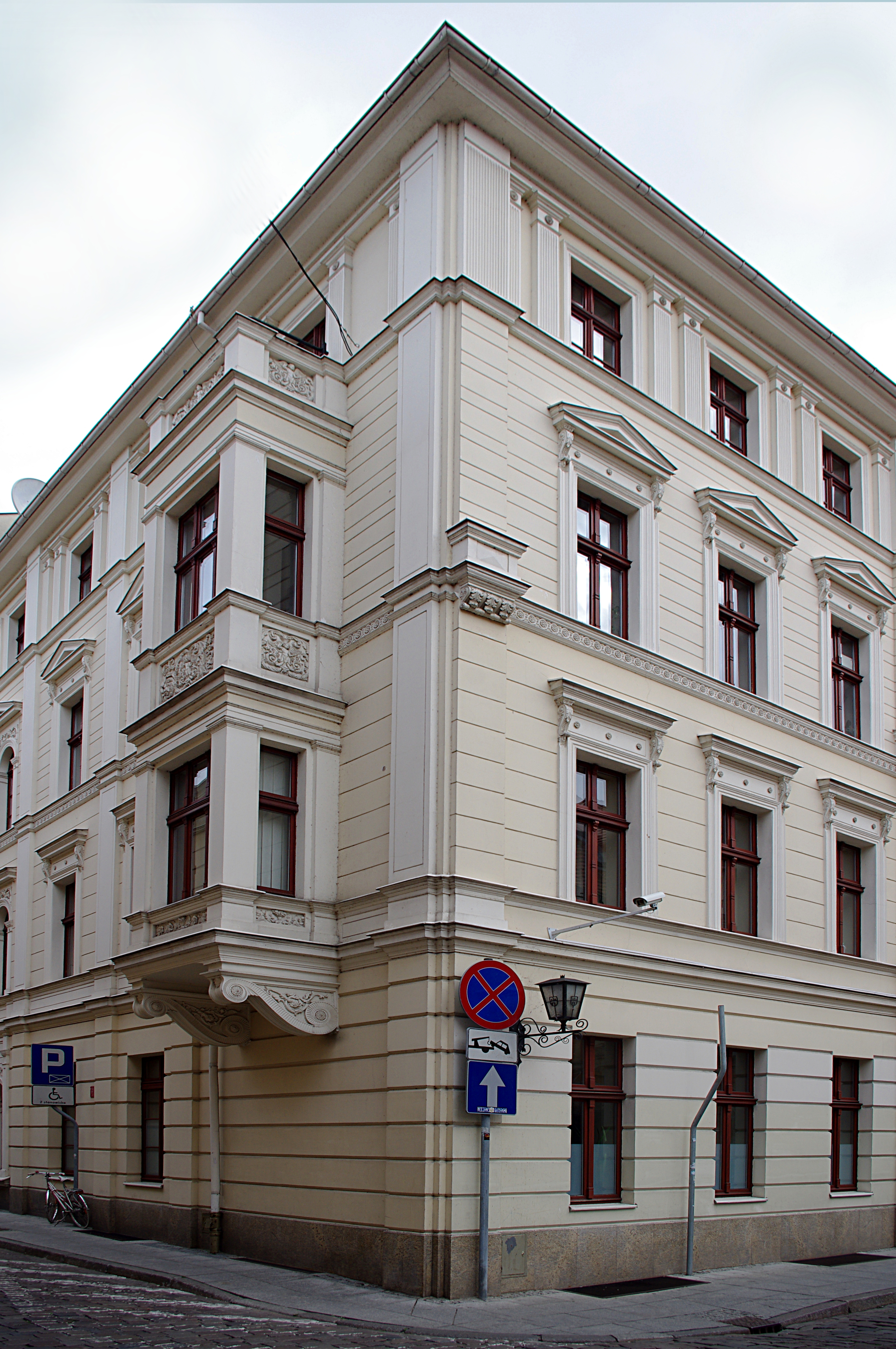
Detail of a bay window

House at 2

Registered on Kuyavian-Pomeranian Voivodeship Heritage list, Nr.601360 Reg.A/883 (January 27, 1971)

1780

Baroque architecture

The first building on this plot was probably erected in the 15th century, as were most of the surrounding houses, but later destroyed, burned or abandoned. The house was rebuilt in the 1770s–1780s, in the Polish baroque style, its address was then Neue Pfarrstraße 14. In 1899, it was closely linked to the neighboring house at Nr.4, housing offices of the "Stadtbriefpost Hansa", a post office ran by Mrs Schwarz, a widow.

At the end of WWII, the building, then nationalized, fell into disrepair. Renovation only occurred in 1980, as one of the first houses aimed by the city project of restoration of the Old Town. Since that time the building houses the Bydgoszcz Scientific Society, with a scientific library, a reading room, editorial offices, a conference hall and a studio. In the 1990s, moved there the Library of the History Department of Kazimierz Wielki University, the Department of Culture of the City Hall, the Office of the State Service for the Protection of Monuments (Polish: Państwowa Służba Ochrony Zabytków, PSOZ), and the Provincial and Municipal Office for the Protection of Monuments.

The townhouse has two storey with an attic and eyelid dormers; its horseshoe-shape footprint has wings onto Jezuicka, Farna and Przyrzecze streets. The upper part of the house displays an 18th-century Polish Baroque style, a passageway with an 18th-century preserved courtyard and an open wooden gallery. The front elevation on Jezuicka street is adorned with medallion-shaped sgraffiti designed by Witold Wasik, representing five scientists and artists associated with Bydgoszcz and the region: Emil Warmiński, Jan Kasprowicz, Jan Śniadecki, Jędrzej Śniadecki and Leon Wyczółkowski.

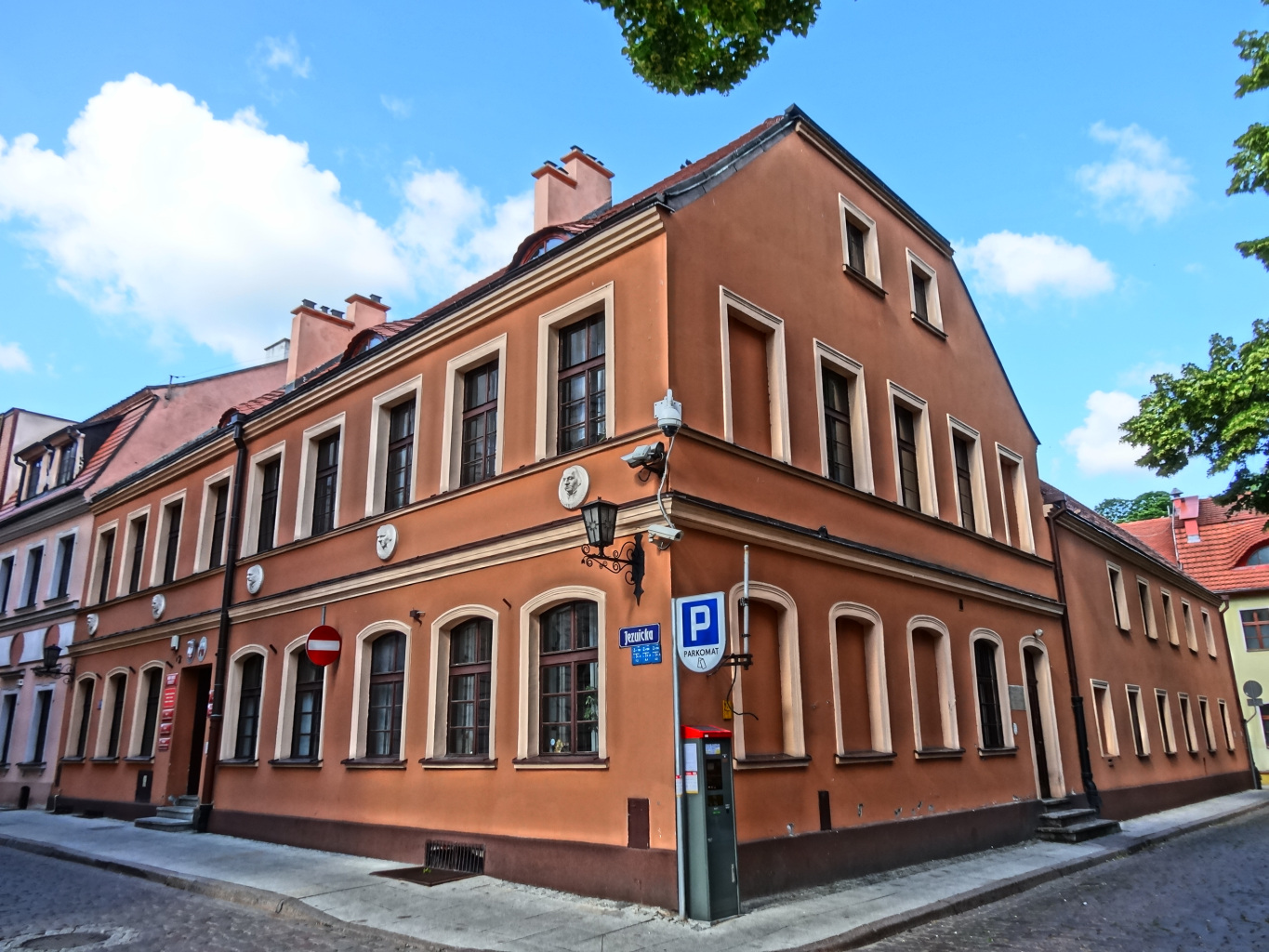
The house at Nr.2

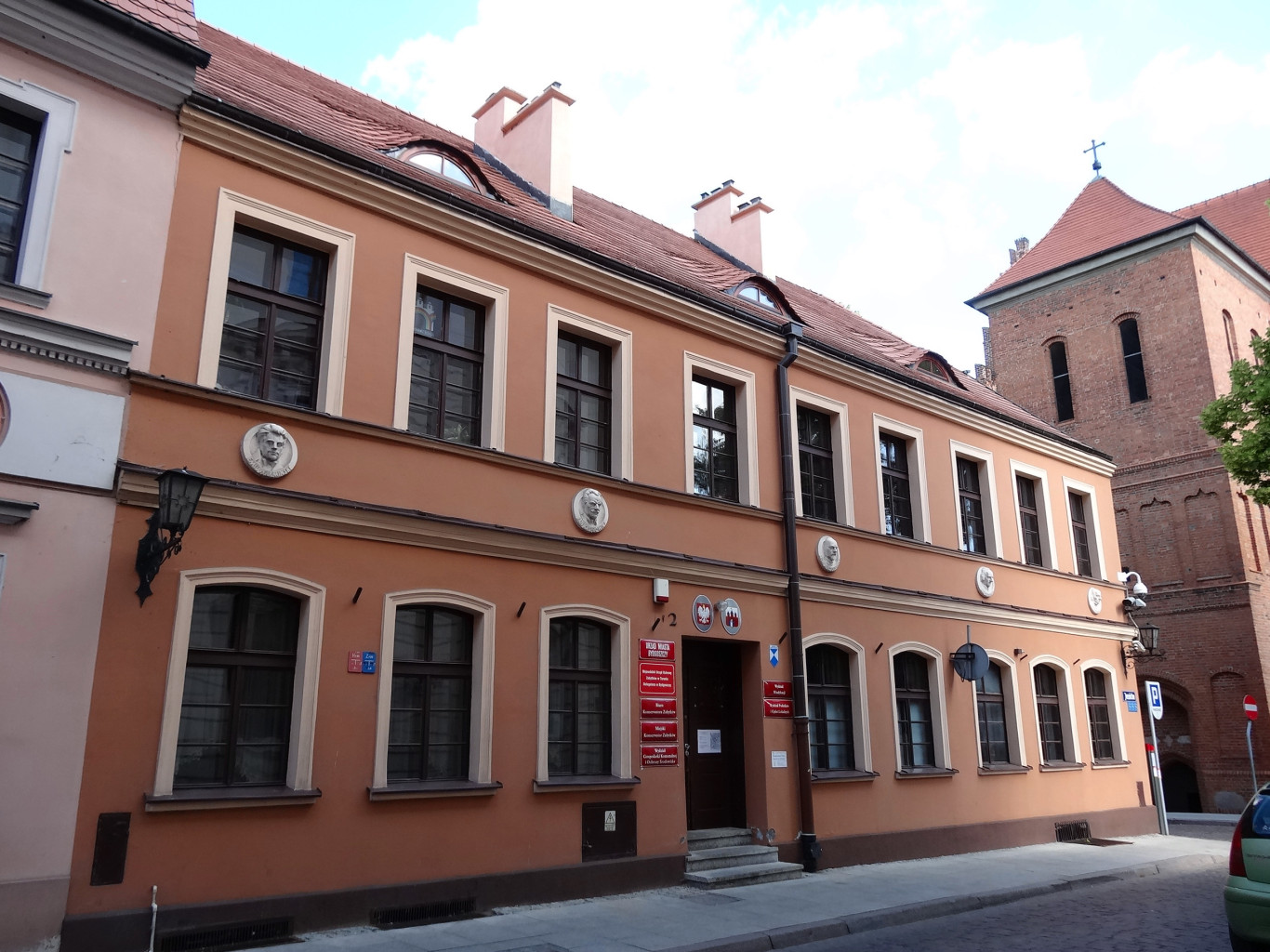
Facade viewed from Jezuicka Street, with famous figure medallions

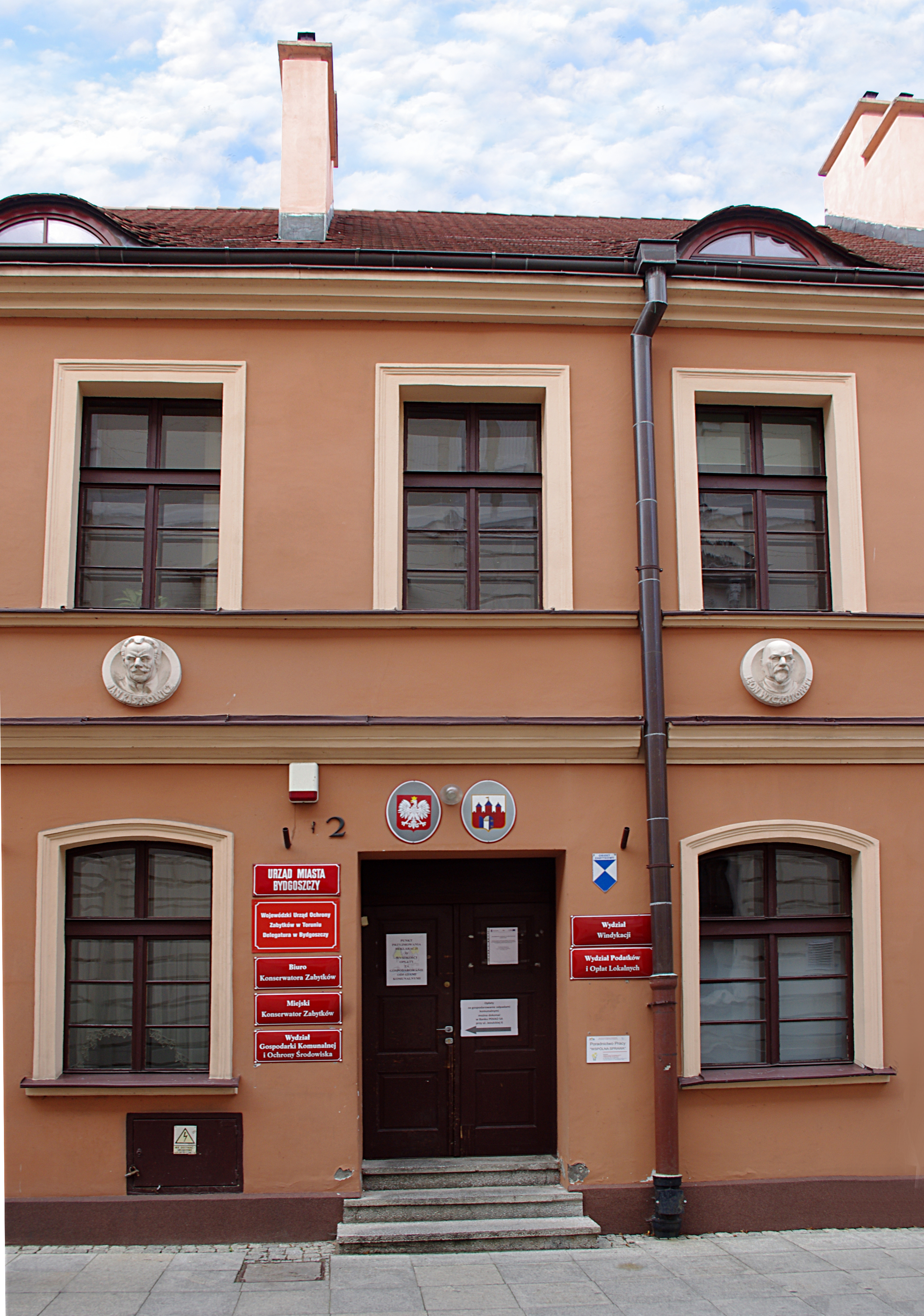
Main door, topped by eyelid dormers

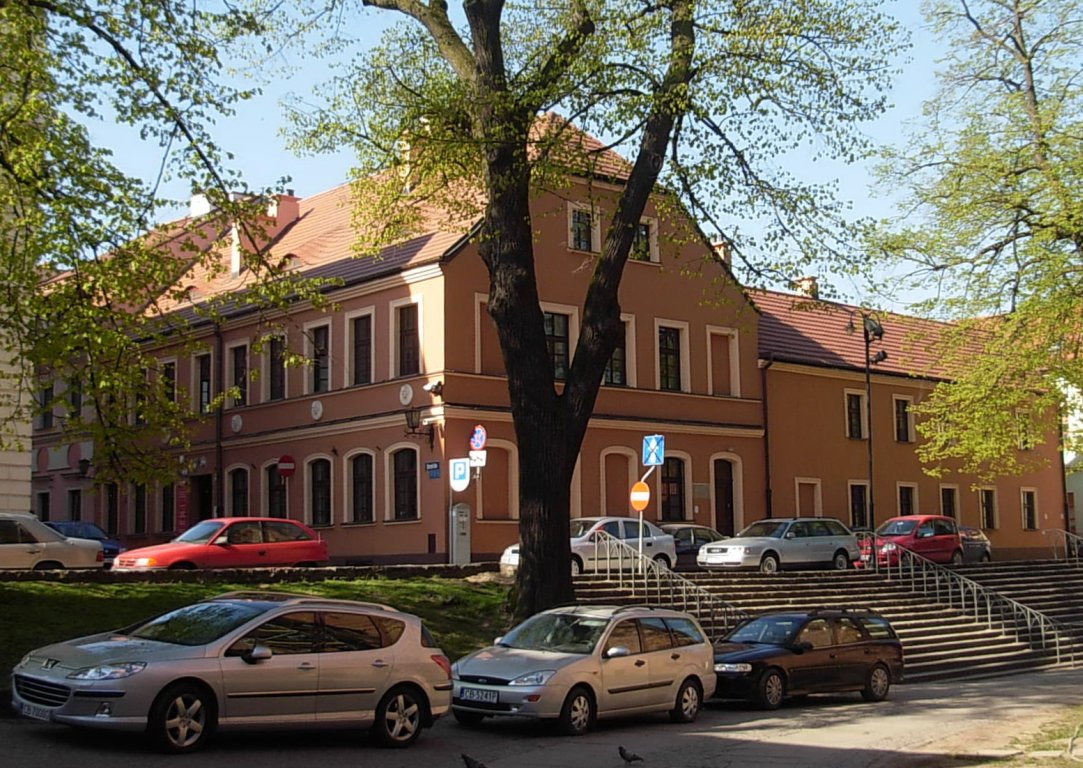
View from the cathedral frontcourt

House at 3, corner with 11 Niedźwiedzia street

1775–76

Baroque architecture

A pharmacy was established here in 1776 under the Prussian occupation: in 1921, it changed names (from Pod Czarnym Orłem/Under the black eagle to Pod Niedźwiedziem/Under the Bear) while changing owners (from Władysław Kużaj to Ignacy Rochon). This was the second oldest pharmacy of the city (the oldest is the pharmacy Under the golden eagle-Polish: Pod Złotym Orłem, at the Old Market Place), but was disbanded in 1950. From 1915, there was also a Polish bookstore (Polish: Księgarnia Bydgoska) run by bookkeeper and publisher Leon Posłuszny. In 2015, a plaque commemorating the Polish pharmacist Ignacy Rochon, shot by the Gestapo in 1939, has been unveiled at the tenement, after his grandson funded the renovation of the house in 2014.

The tenement architecture strikes by the bear figure set over the entry, symbol of the gone pharmacy, as well as by the eyelid dormers on the roof.

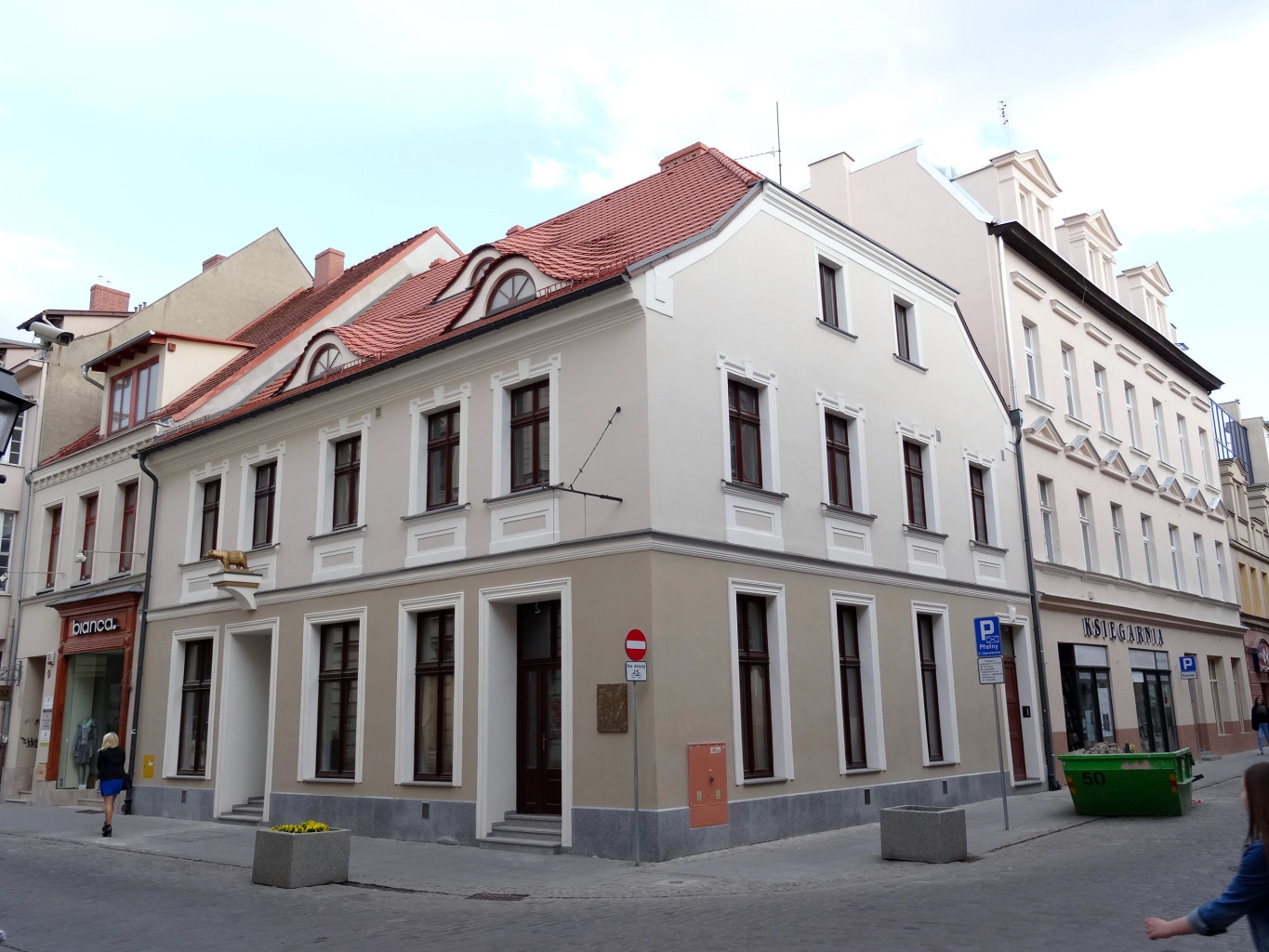
View from Jezuicka street

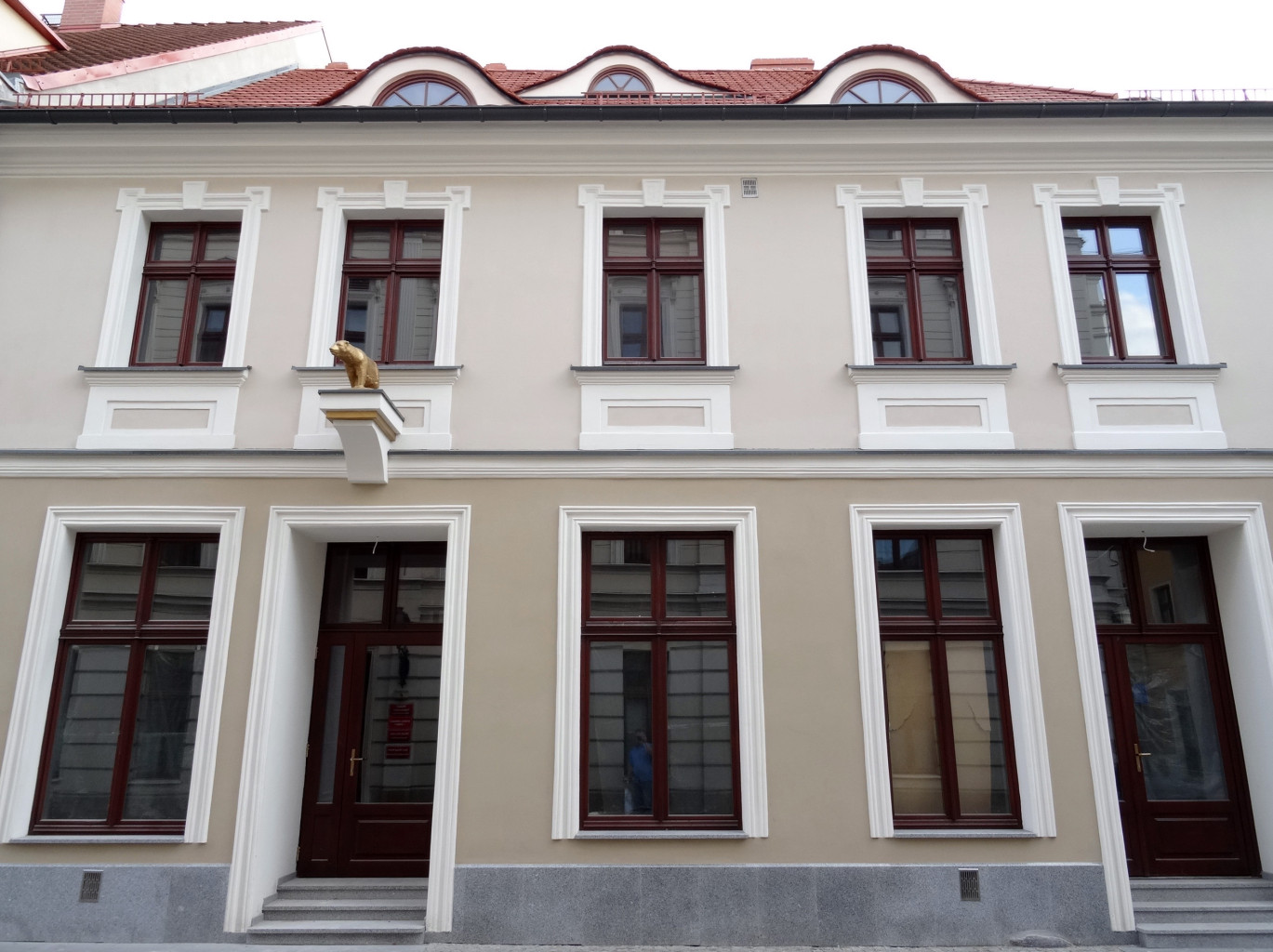
Facade onto Niedźwiedzia street

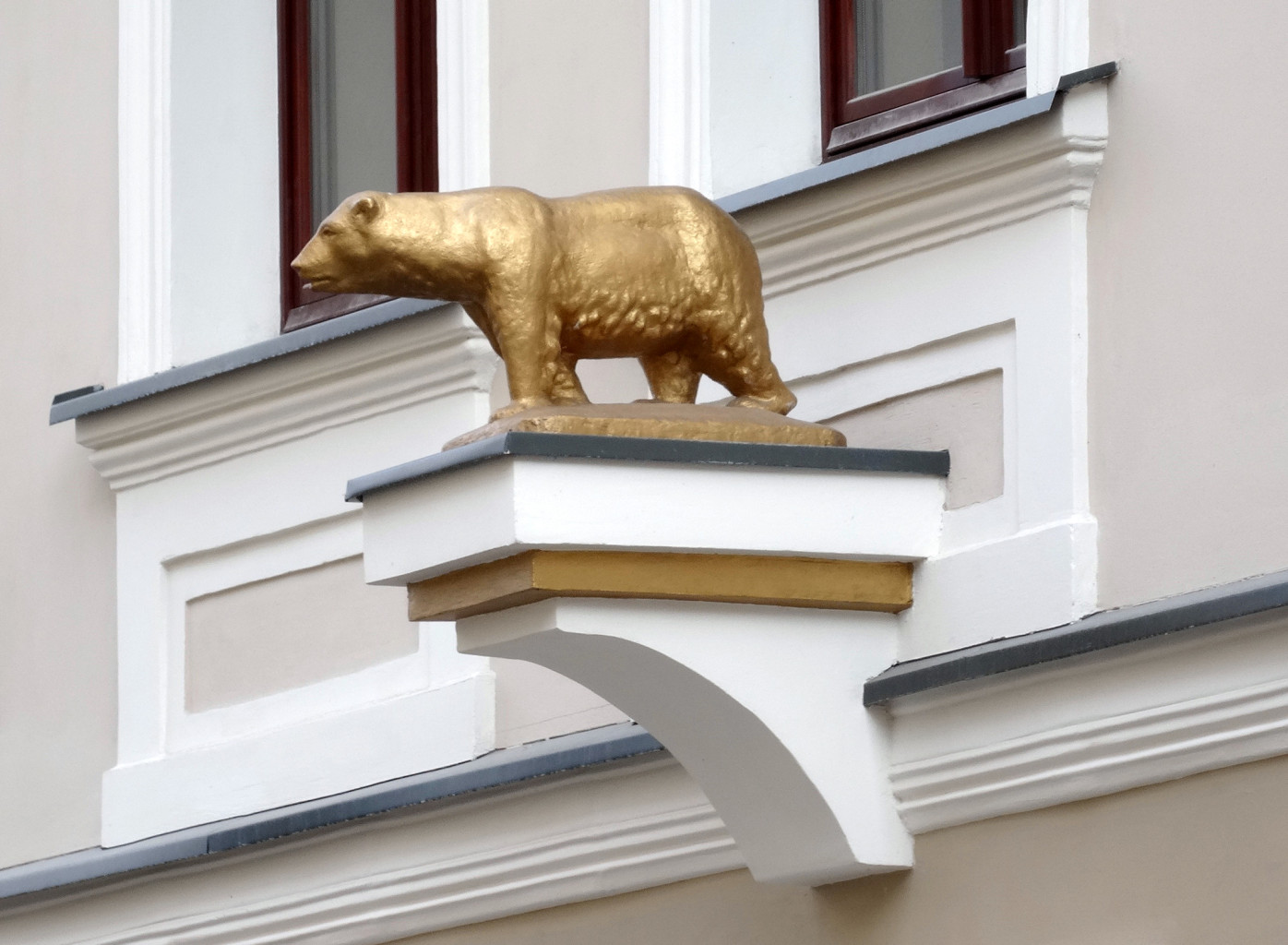
Detail of the bear, symbol of the gone pharmacy

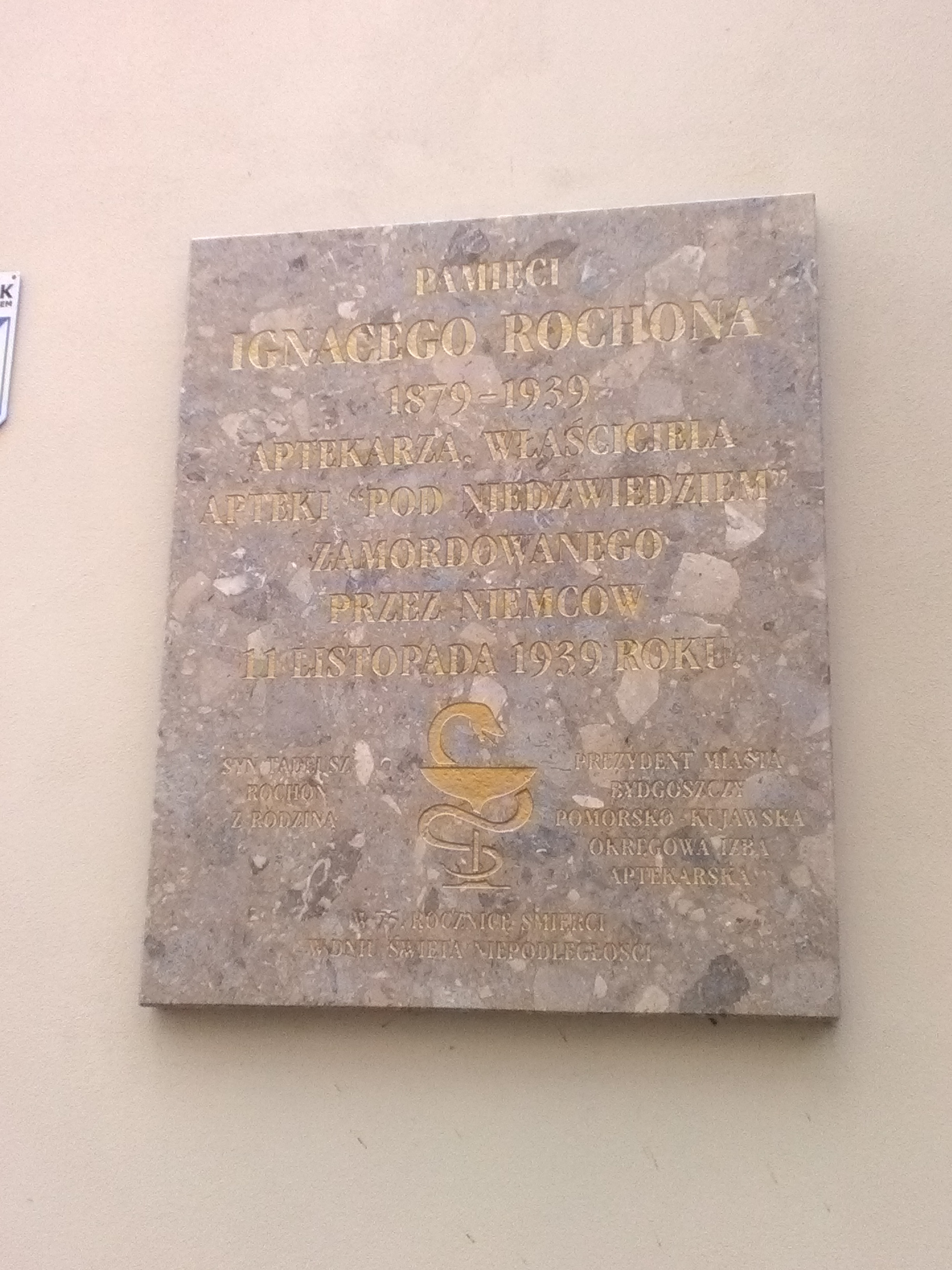
Plaque in memoriam of Ignacy Rochon

House at 4

Registered on Kuyavian-Pomeranian Voivodeship Heritage list, Nr.601361 Reg.A/885 (August 28, 1967)

1744–1775

Baroque architecture

The first building on this plot dates back to the 15th century, according to the dating of preserved brick cellars. The first known owner at the end of the 17th century is identified as Felicjan Grzybowski. His widow, Regina Grzybowska sold the property in 1764 to the Rehberg family. The house was rebuilt in 1775 once Christian Wilhelm Schulz bought it. Until the end of the 18th century, owners were real estate agents, such as Jan Gottlieb Rump (1792), Jan Gabriel Oppermann (1793), and Jan Daniel Kranz, an auditor of the Office of Excise Tax. From the beginning of the 19th century until 1839, the owner was Frederick Wilhelm Kutzer, a tanner. After him, the new landlord was Luisa Adler, one of the most influential lady in the city during Prussian period. She was the widow of a counselor of Bydgoszcz regency and land owner (he possessed the area of Górzyskowo district of Bydgoszcz), who changed his name to Adlershorst. One of her sons, Friedrich Wilhelm, was an architect who designed Bydgoszcz St Peter's and St Paul's Church on Plac Wolności.

From 1842 to 1874, the house belonged to a metal craftsman, Fryderyk, related to Frederick Wilhelm Kutzer the tanner. Following landlords were:

- Carl Reinhold Lange, inspector of the military hospital;
- Julius Goldstein, a merchant;
- the German loan fund until 1885.

In 1899, a post office, "Stadtbriefpost Hansa", led by Mrs Schwarz, a widow established here. It used also the neighbouring house at Nr.2 for office purposes.

After the end of World War II, the house was taken over by the State Treasury and was intended for housing tenants. Between 1967 and 1969, the edifice was restored according to Stefan Klajbor's design, who also designed Bydgoszcz Pomeranian Philharmonic. In 1969, Bydgoszcz Scientific Society (Polish: Bydgoskie Towarzystwo Naukowe) moved there, together with facilities at Nr.2. Today, the tenement also houses the Association of friends of Bydgoszcz City (Polish: Towarzystwo Miłośników Miasta Bydgoszczy).

The townhouse is a two-storey building with an attic. The basement still keeps preserved Gothic vaults from the 15th century. Upper stories date back to the second half of the 18th century, following Polish Baroque architecture style. The front elevation displays an arched portal and two adorned shed dormers. Interiors are decorated with Gdansk-Flemish baroque style furniture.

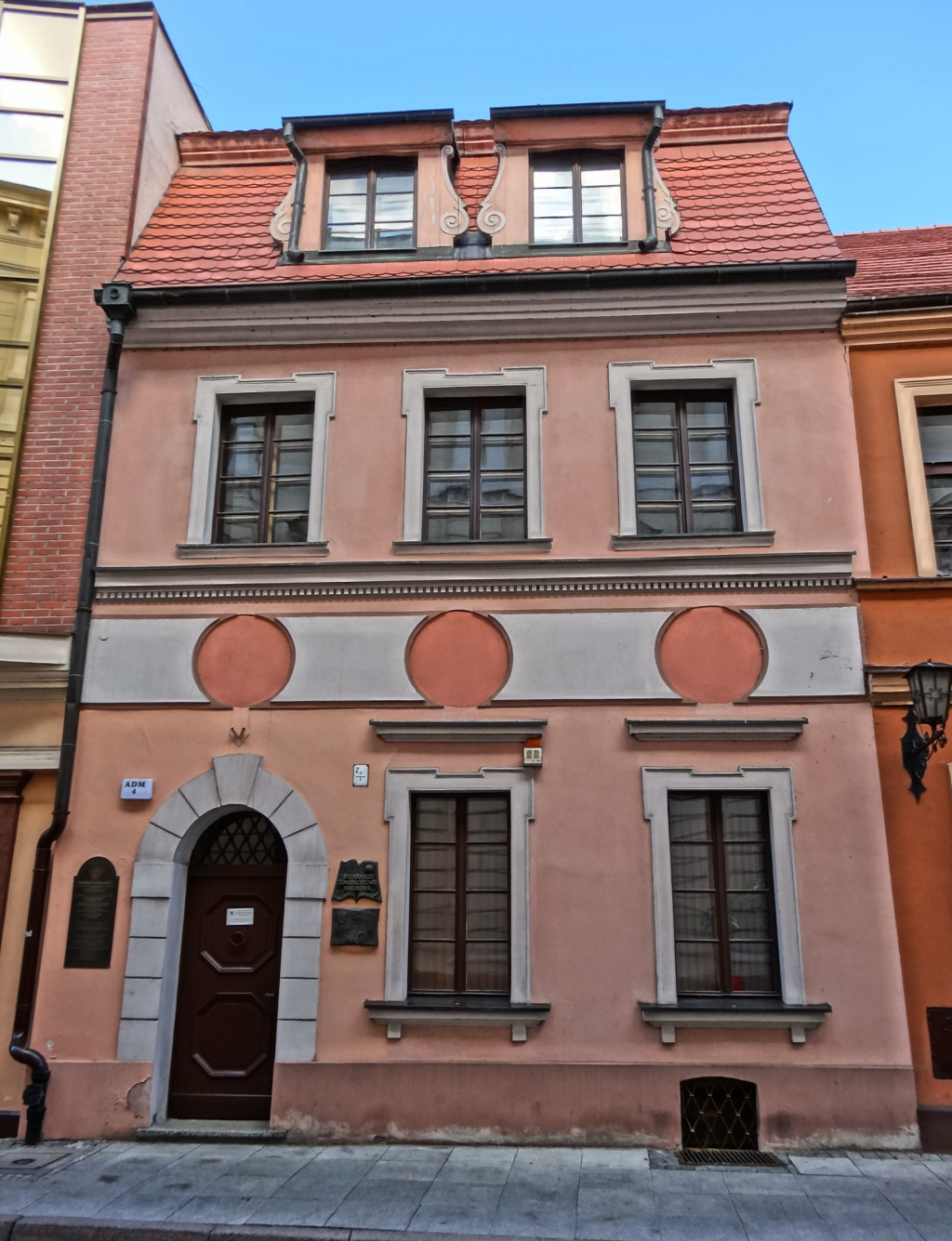
View from the street

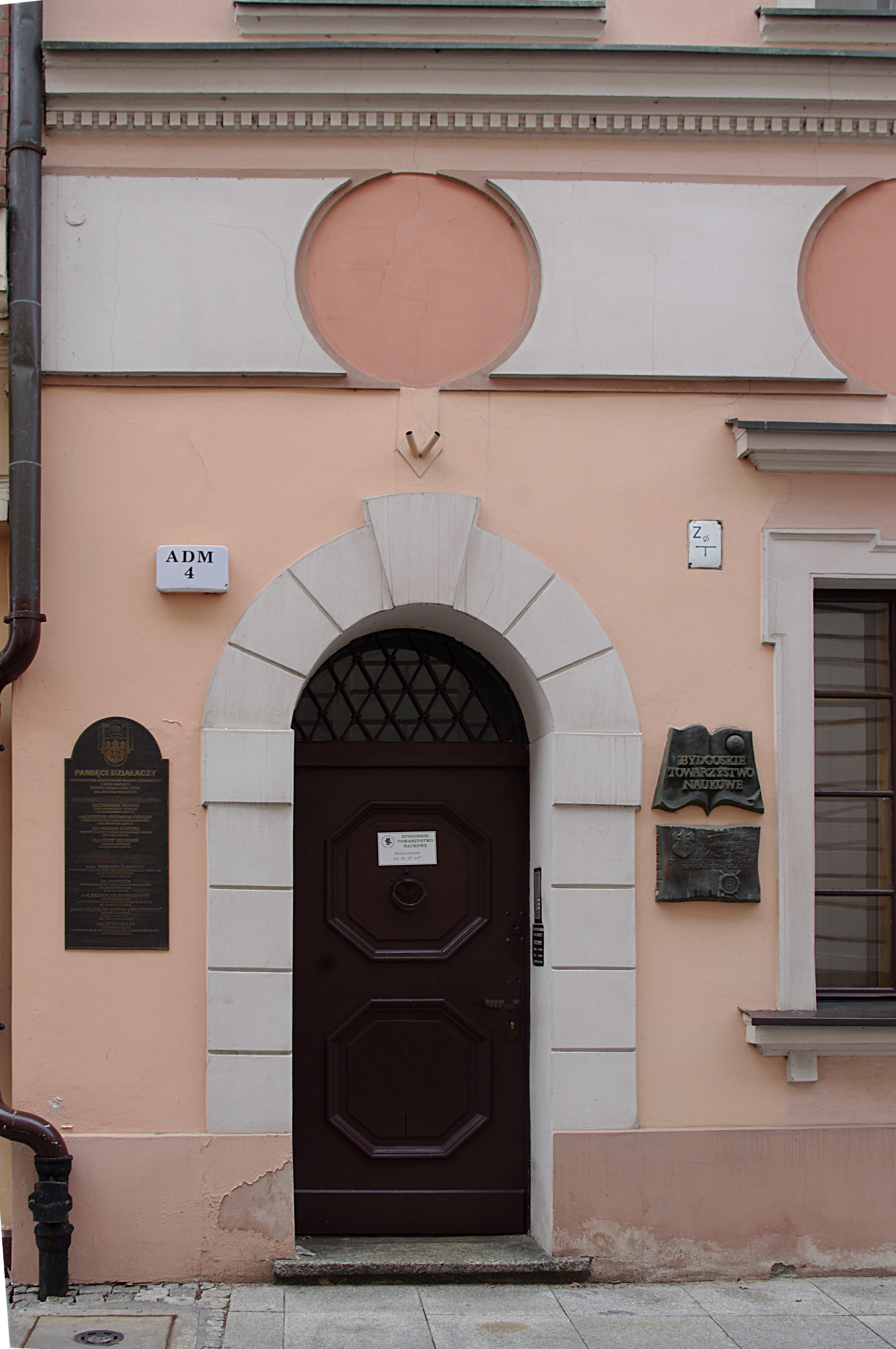
Portal

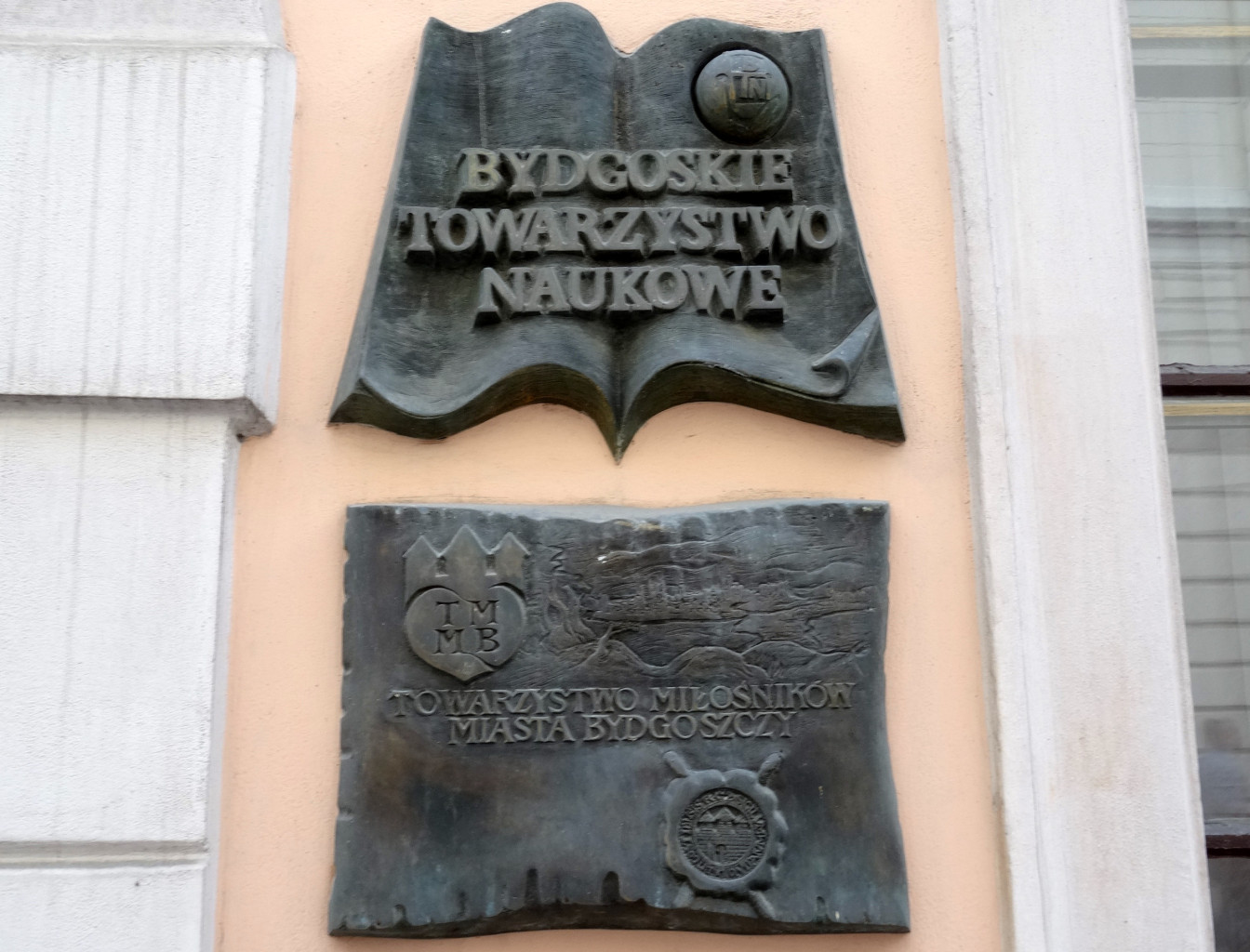
Plaques of the associations

House at 5

1850–1900

Eclecticism

The present tenement had for first landlord Johann Sawiskowski, a barber, in the 1850s; address was then Neue Pfarstraße 18. In the 1880s landlords were from the Cohn family, active Jewish merchants and rentiers in the old town. The building has mainly been used as a tenant house.

Main elevation displays typical eclectic features, with triangular pediments, decorative lintels and three large shed dormers.

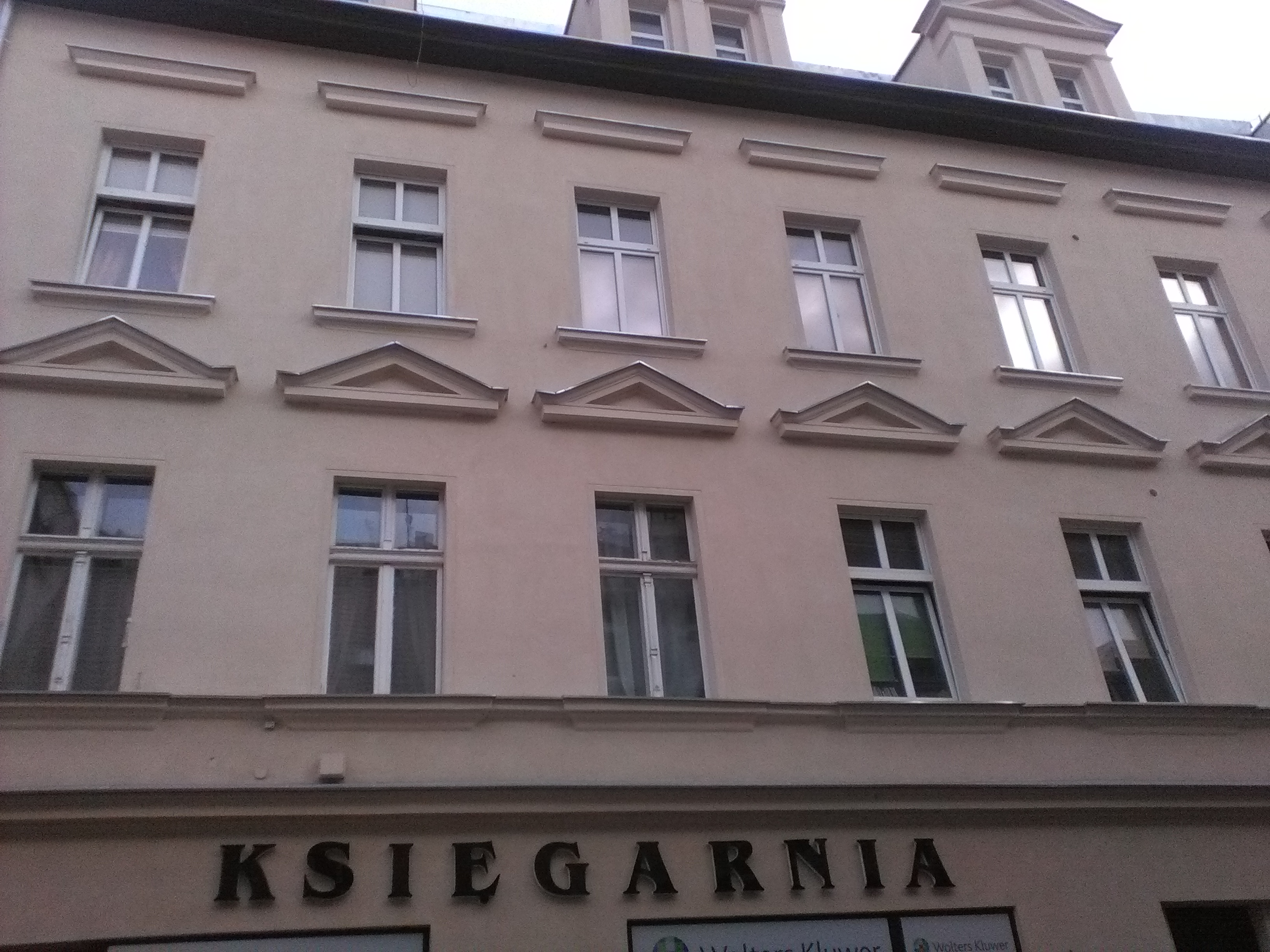
Main elevation on the street

House at 6

1893, by Carl Rose

Eclecticism

Johann Schulß, a foodmonger, owned the house located at then Neue Pfarstraße 12 in the 1860s. Anton Hoffmann, a Bydgoszcz architect, lived there with his family from 1866 to 1876. In 1893, Polish architect Carl Rose rebuilt the house as it is today. Carl Rose had designed other buildings in Bydgoszcz, mainly in Gdańska Street (16, 51, 135).

Main elevation is richly adorned: bossage on the ground floor, cartouches and broken pediments on the first level, dentil corniced openings on the second floor, topped by corbel table. The brick facade highlights nicely the whiteness of the plasterer motifs.

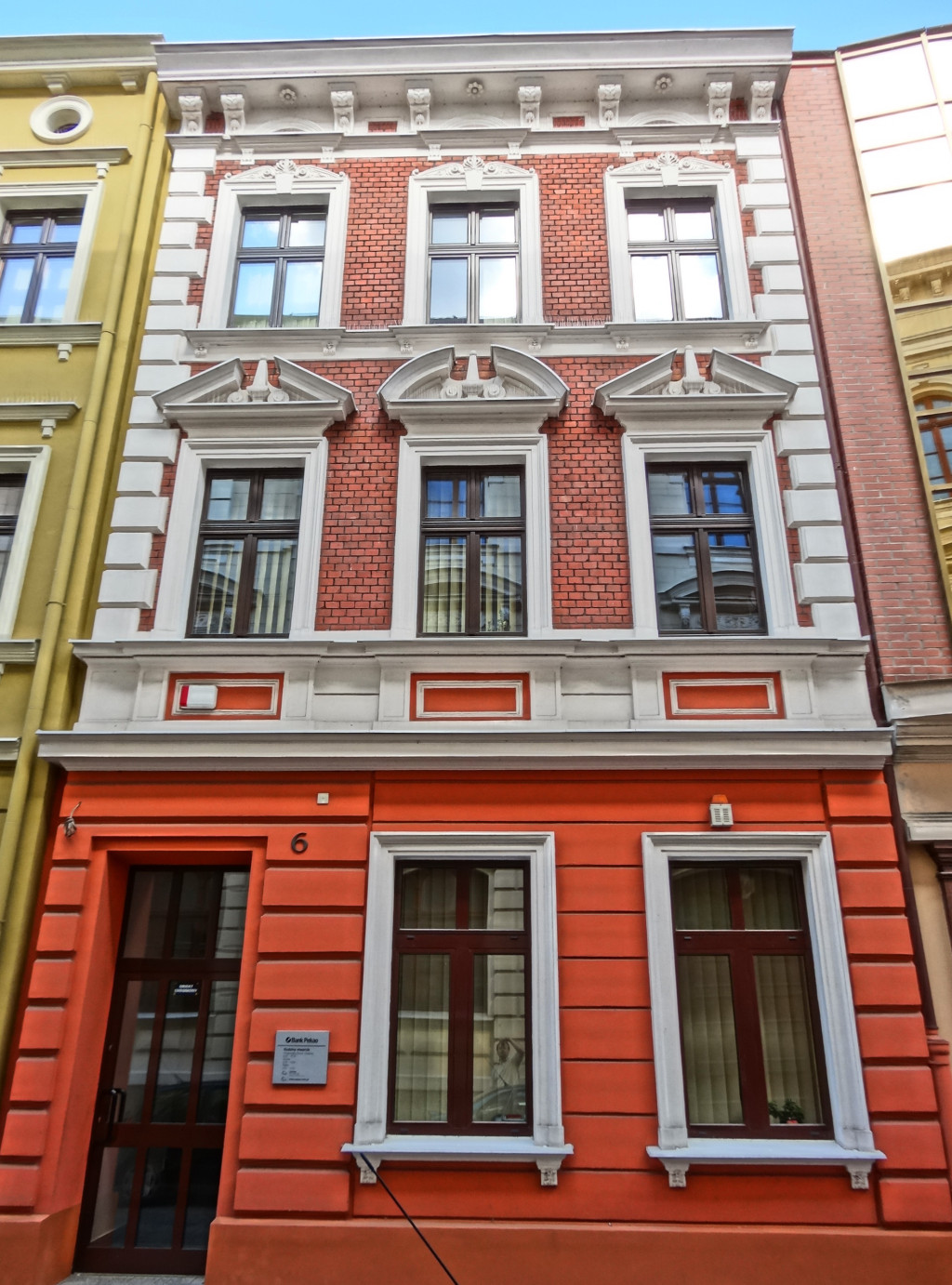
Main elevation

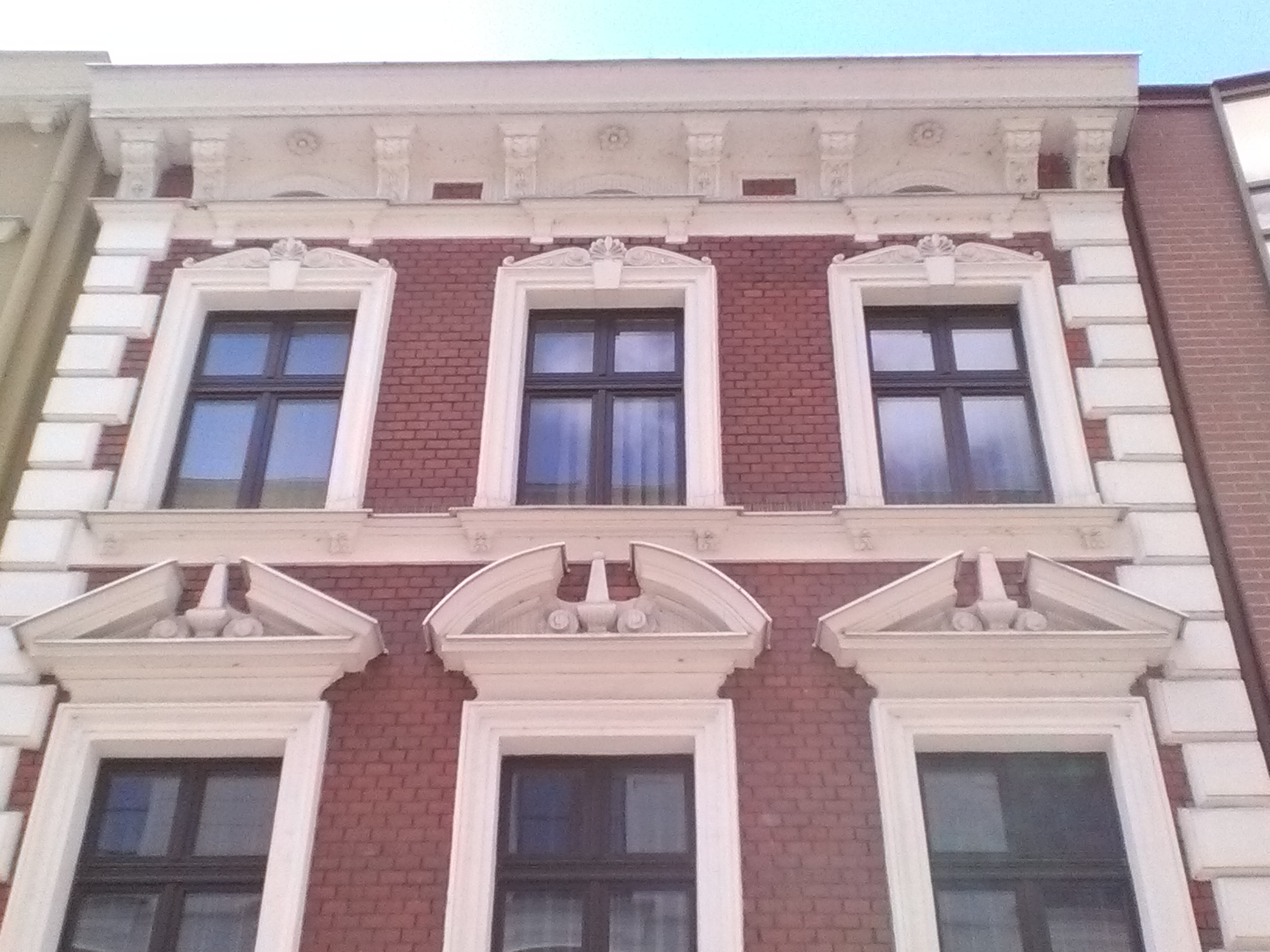
Detail of the motifs on the upper floors

Houses at 8/14

1850–1900

Eclecticism

Those tenements date back to the same period. Nr.8 had a teacher, Theophil Wolowski, as first landlord. In the 1880s, a book shop had been opened at Nr.10, run by Louis Carow. Building at Nr.14 had housed for many decades a restaurant (from the early 1870s until the end of WWI), today it is the seat of Bydgoszcz Cultural Affairs (Polish: Biuro Kultury Bydgoskiej).

Facades mirror one another, incorporating many neoclassical elements. Houses at Nr.8 and 10 display a few more architectural motifs, especially in the decoration of the openings (lintels, corbels, dentils).

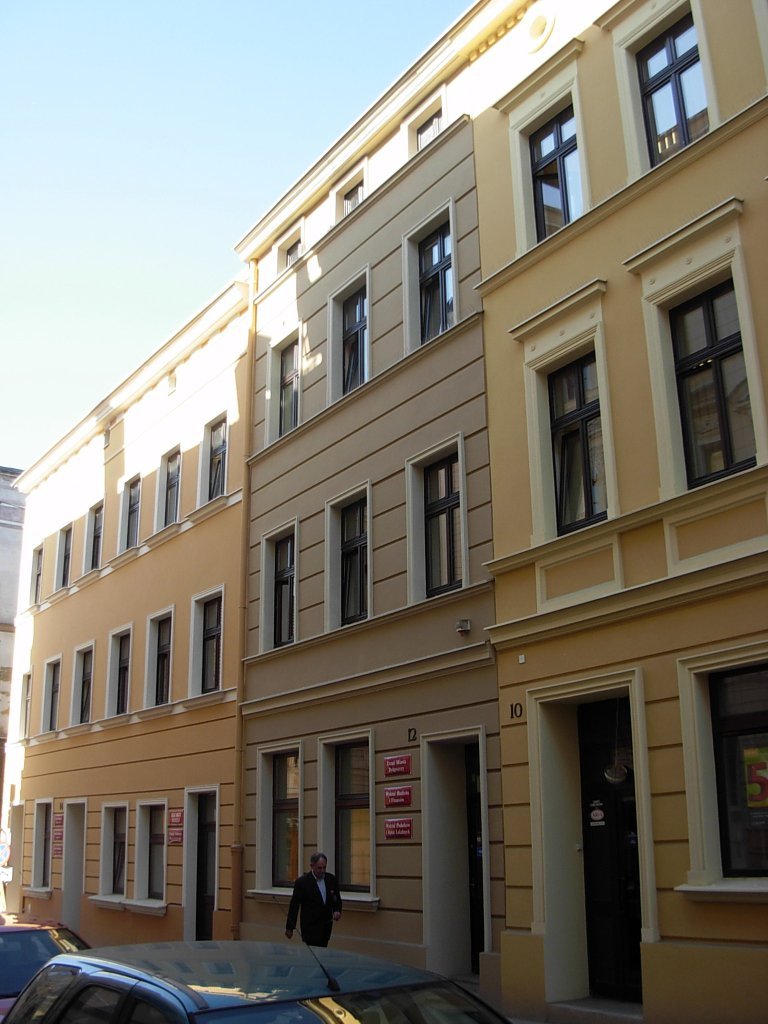
Main elevations of Nr.10 to 14

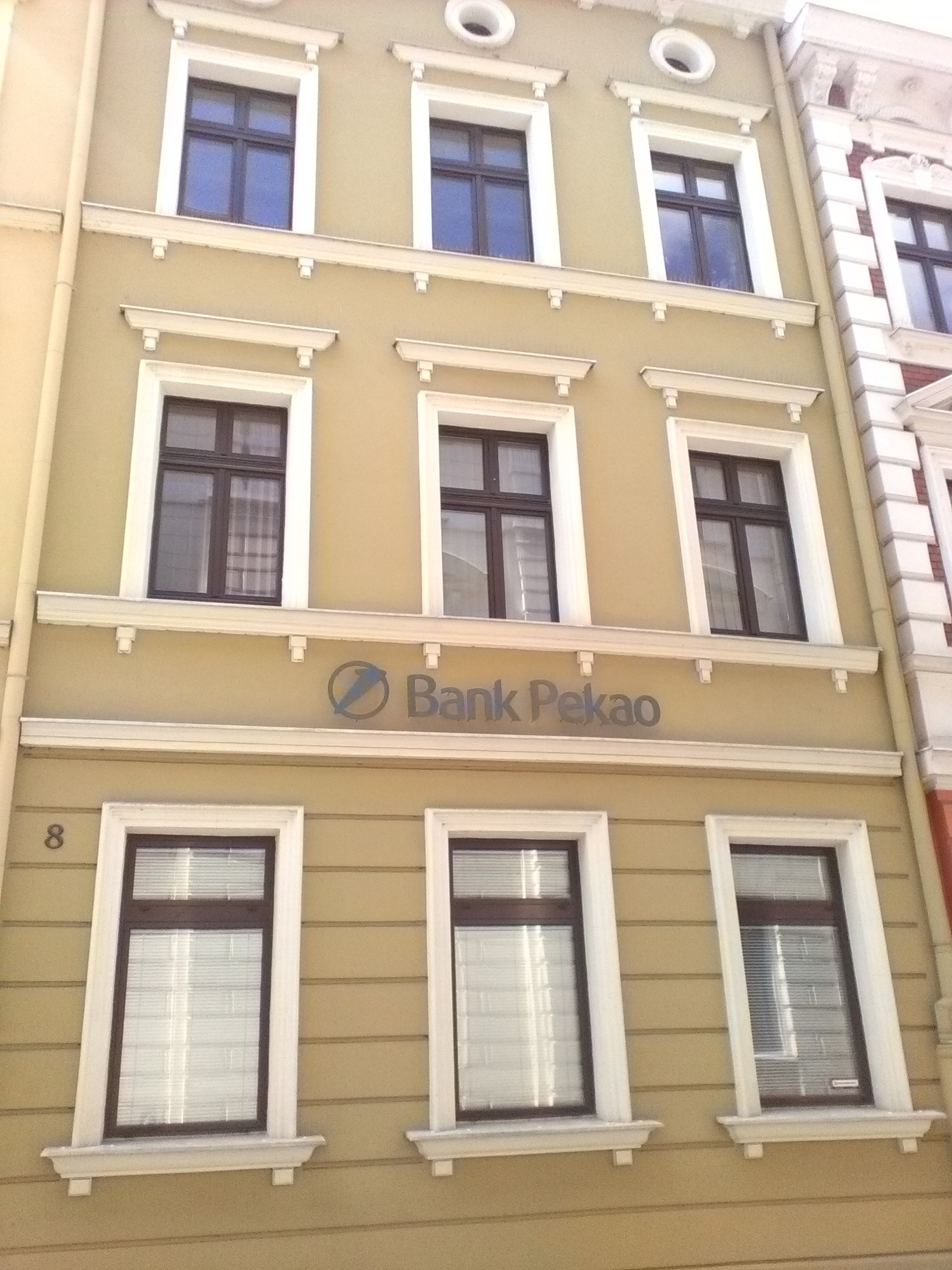
Facade at Nr.8

House at 9, corner with 25 Długa street

1776–1777

Corner house with Długa street, it mirrors with the same style the house at Długa 23. In the second half of the 19th century, the building landlord, Moritz Aronsohn, had a printhouse there. One can notice the preserved wrought iron balcony.

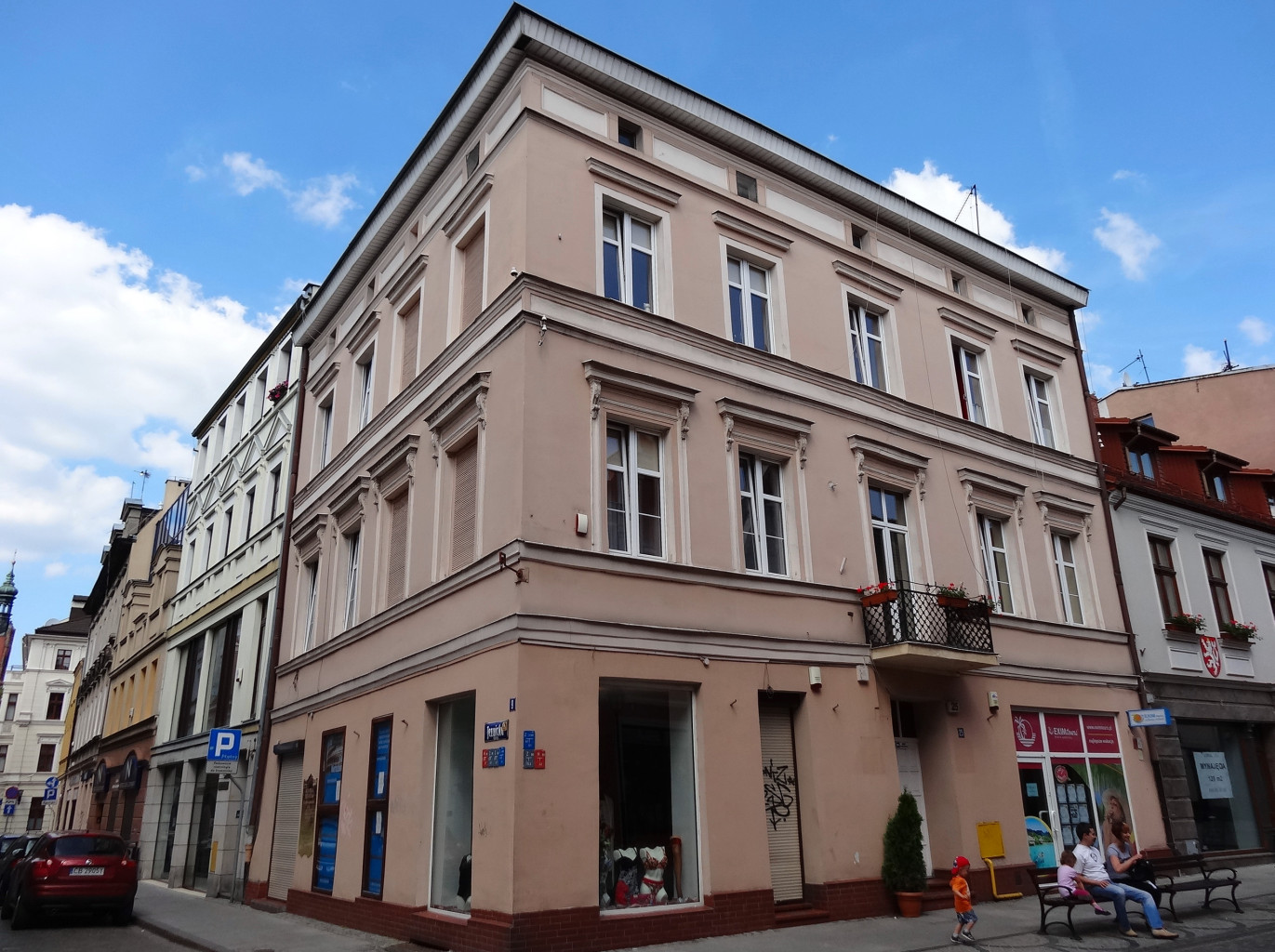
Main elevation of the corner

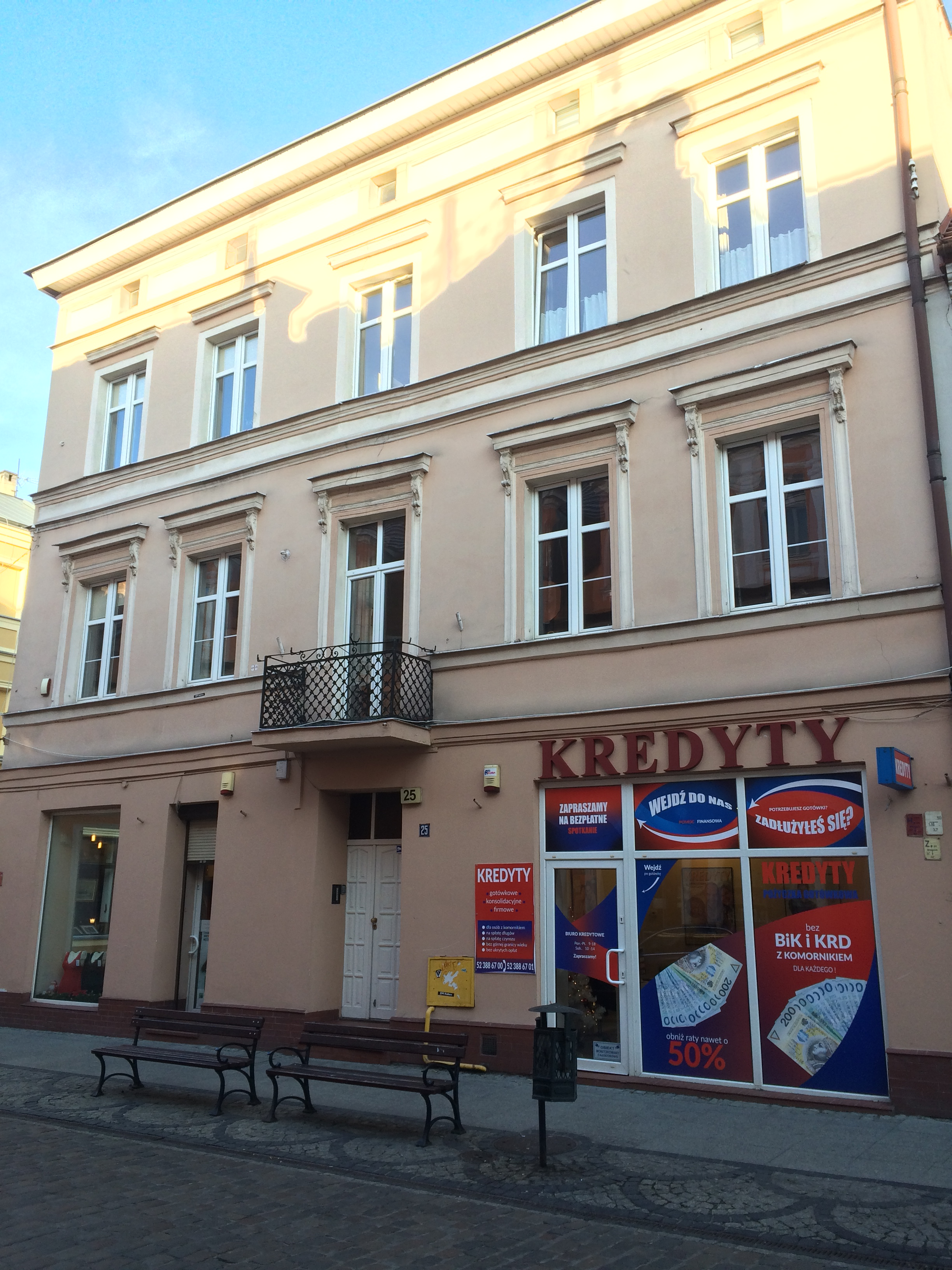
Facade onto Dluga street

House at 16, corner with Ku Młynom street

1905

Neoclassical architecture

Before it was rebuilt with the current style, the tenement had housed the firm of Wilhem Biegon, a flour merchant, from the 1860s until the end of Prussian period (early 1920s). Today, the ground floor welcomes a restaurant, Kukuryku.

Facades are stripped from any details, as understood in Neoclassical architecture. Few geometrical motifs can be noticed above the second floor, with some dentils. The main entrance on Jezuicka street boasts a superb adorned wood-panelled portal. This corner house has been entirely restored in 2016.

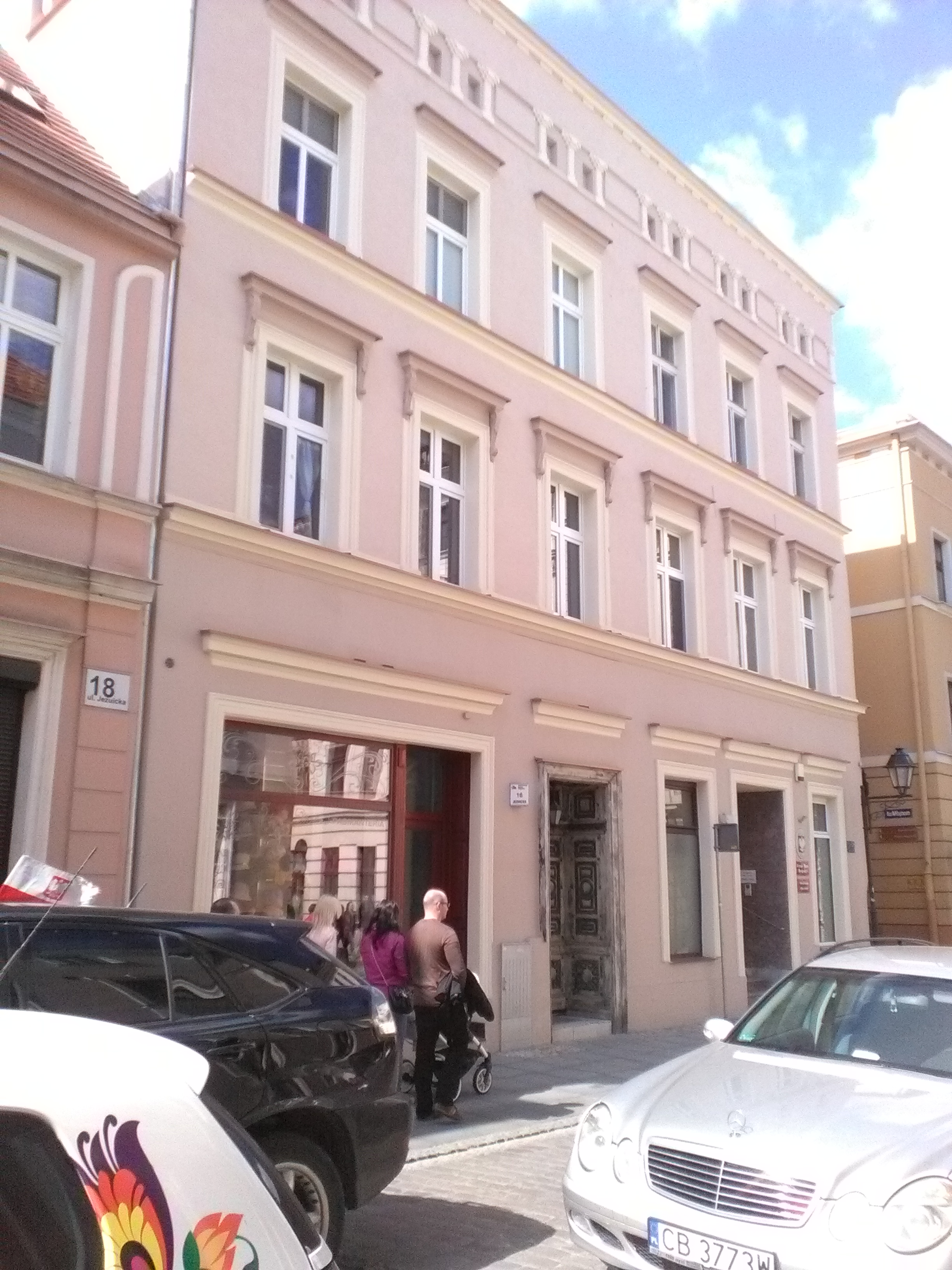
Elevation on Jezuicka street

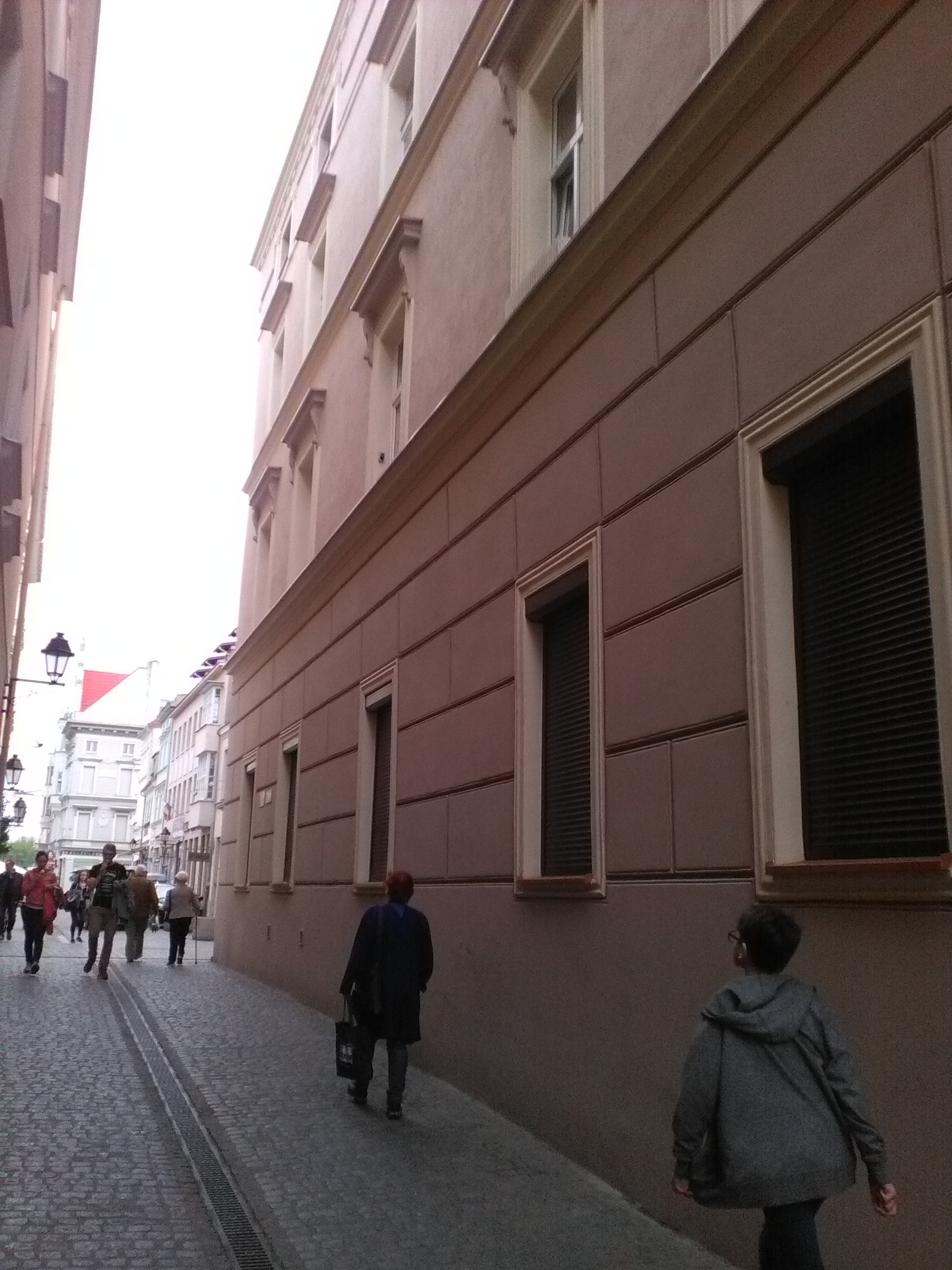
Facade on Ku Młynom street

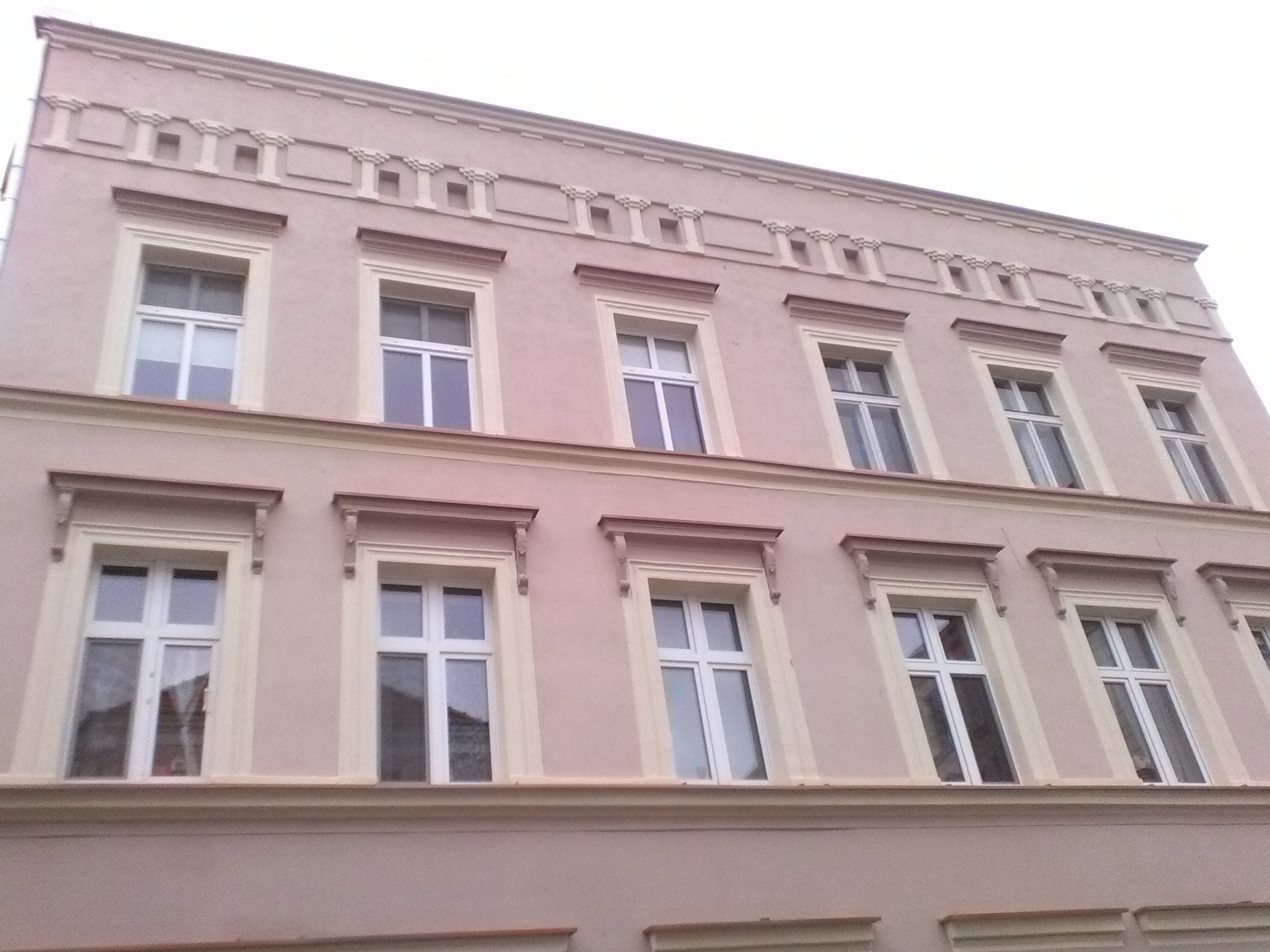
Detail of the upper elevation

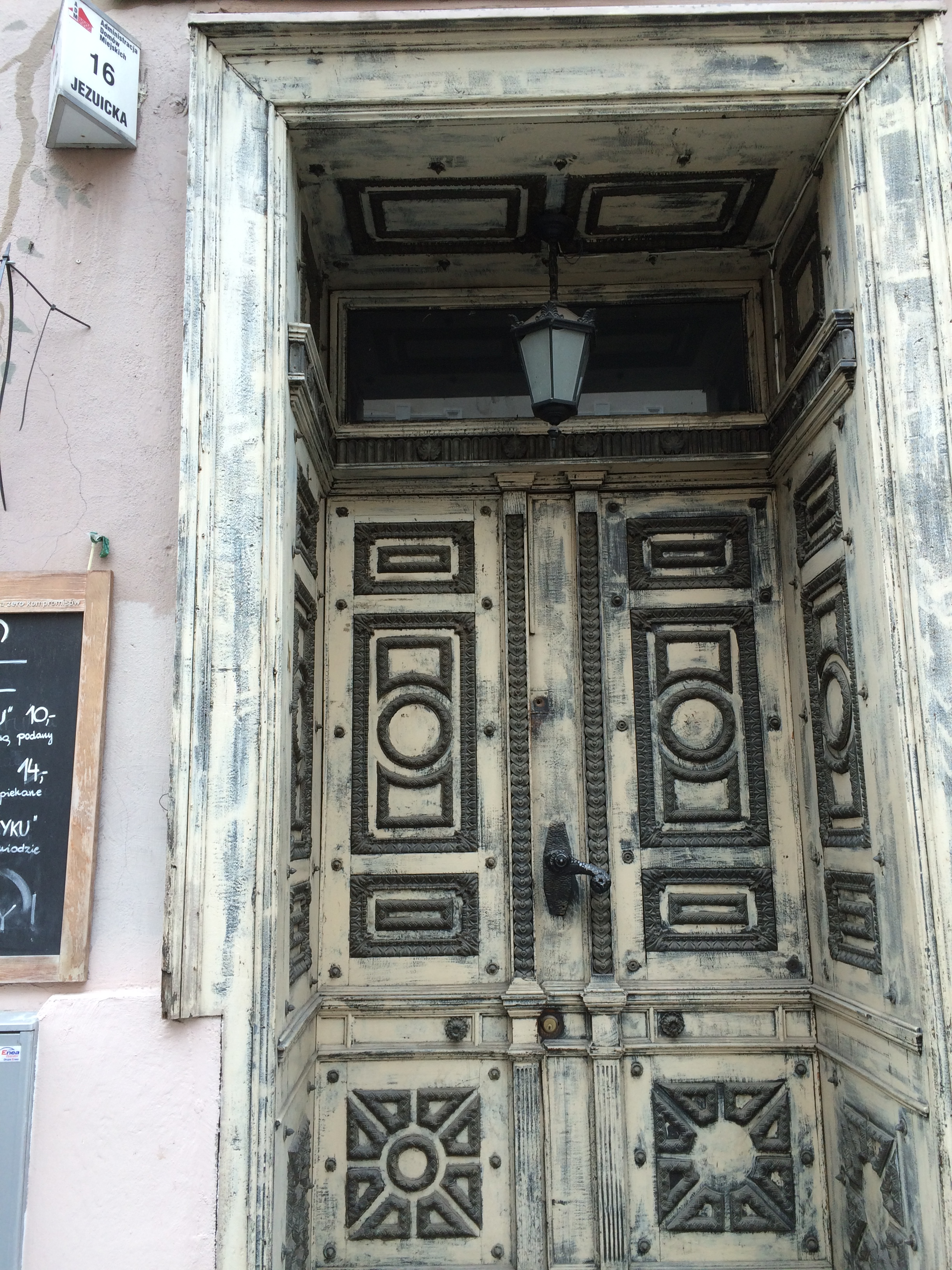
Adorned portal

House at 18

1850

Neoclassical architecture

Initial address was Neue Pfarrstraße 5. The house design is very close to the ones built at the same time in downtown Bydgoszcz, at Focha street 6 or Gdanska Street 40. Today, it houses municipality offices.

One can notice the characteristically large shed dormer.

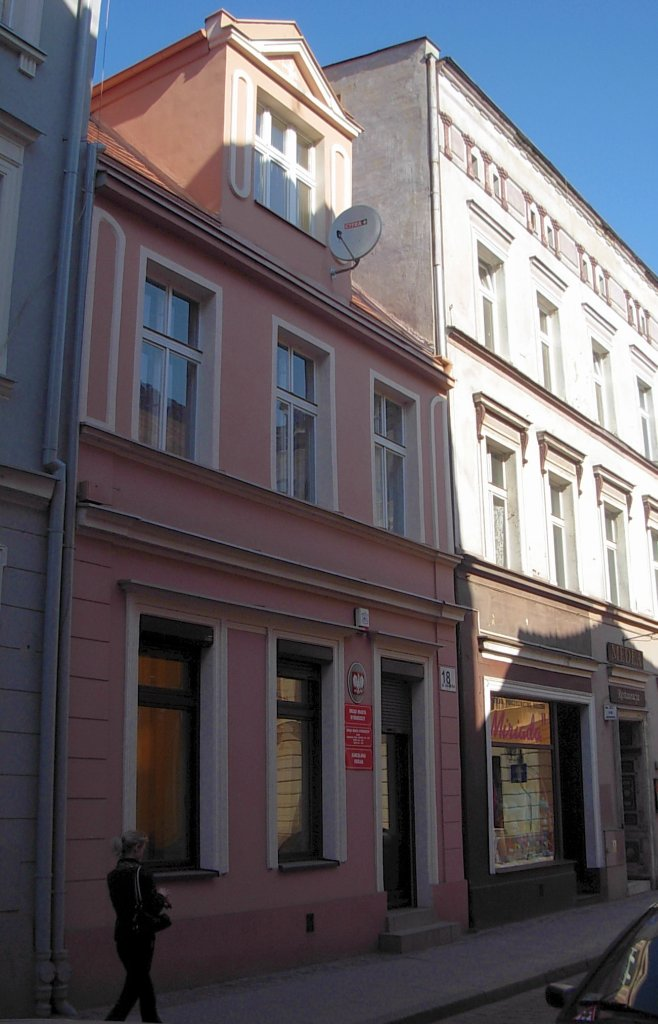
Main elevation

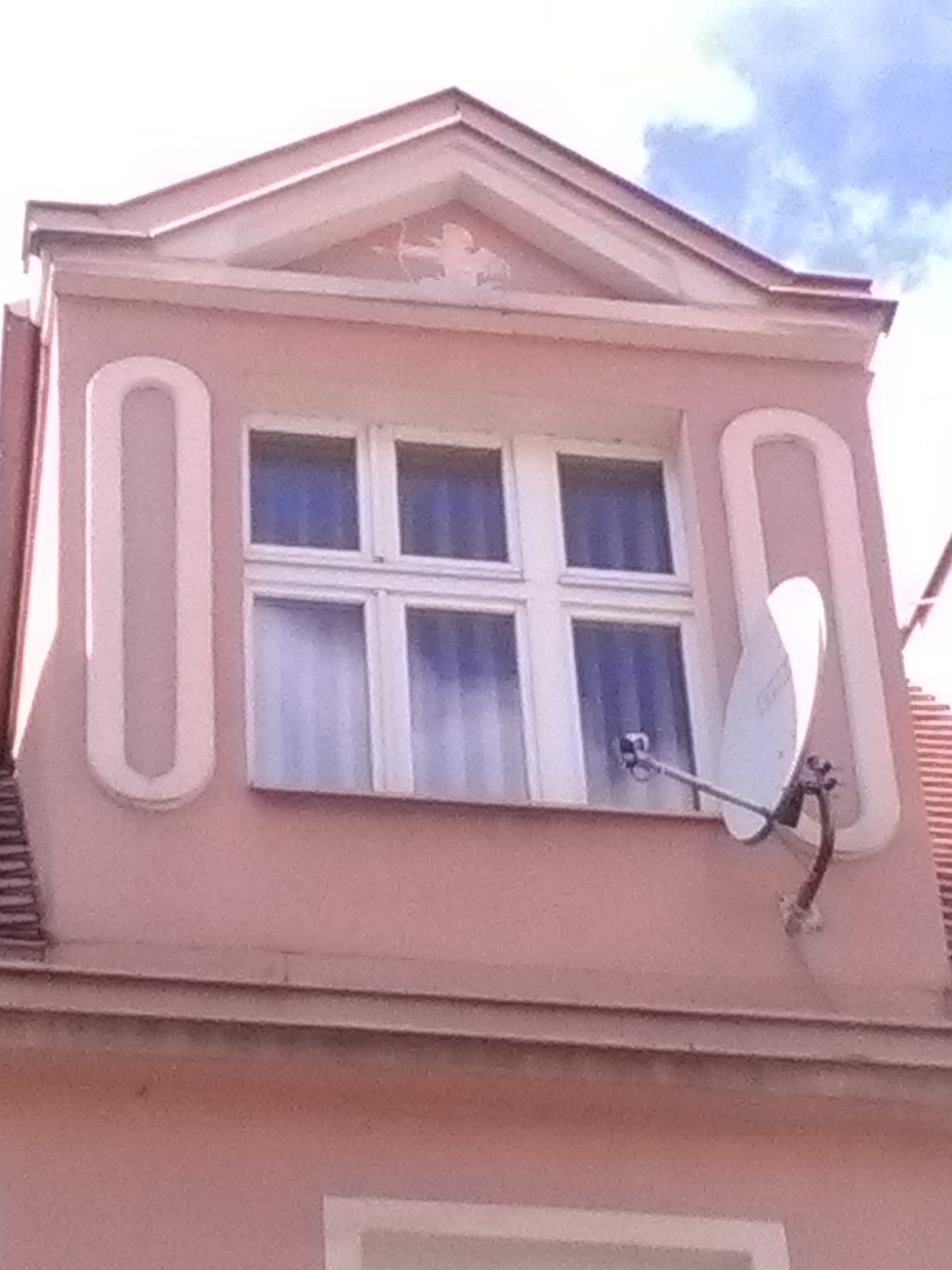
Shed dormer

Houses at 20 and 22

1850

Neoclassical architecture

Both tenements have been built in the mid-19th century. At Nr.20, Carl Müller, owner since the 1870s, moved there in the 1880s and opened a locksmith and machines fixing workshop. He then lived there as a rentier until the end of World War I. At Nr.20, Gustav Abicht, a merchant in clothing business, lived there from the 1860s until the 1920s.

Facades mirror each other, with very few architectural details, except for geometrical pediments on first floor facade at Nr.22.

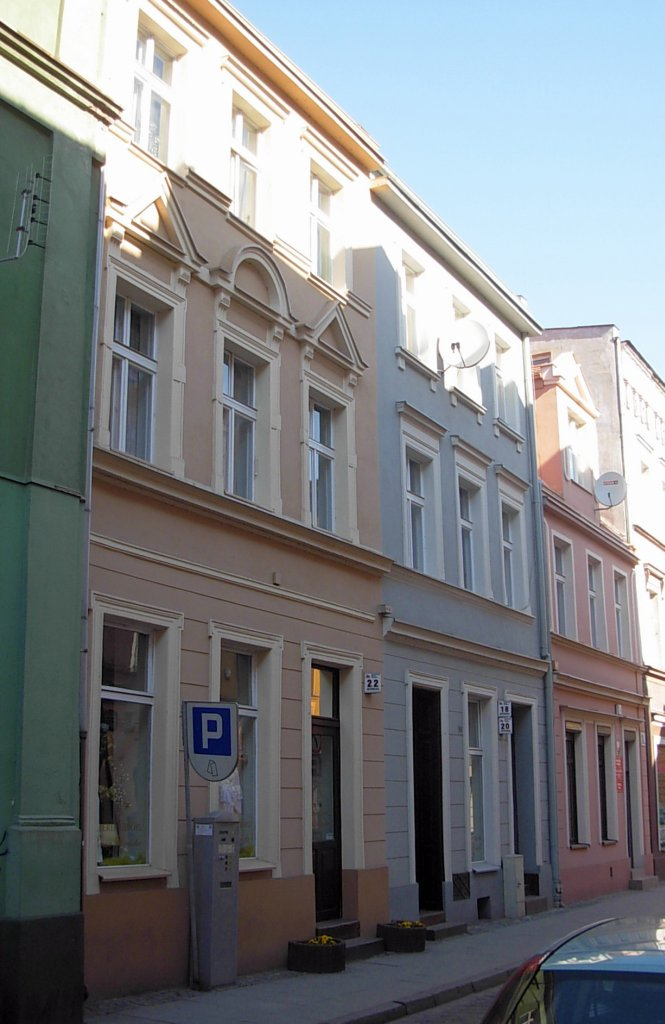
Elevations at Nr.20 and 22

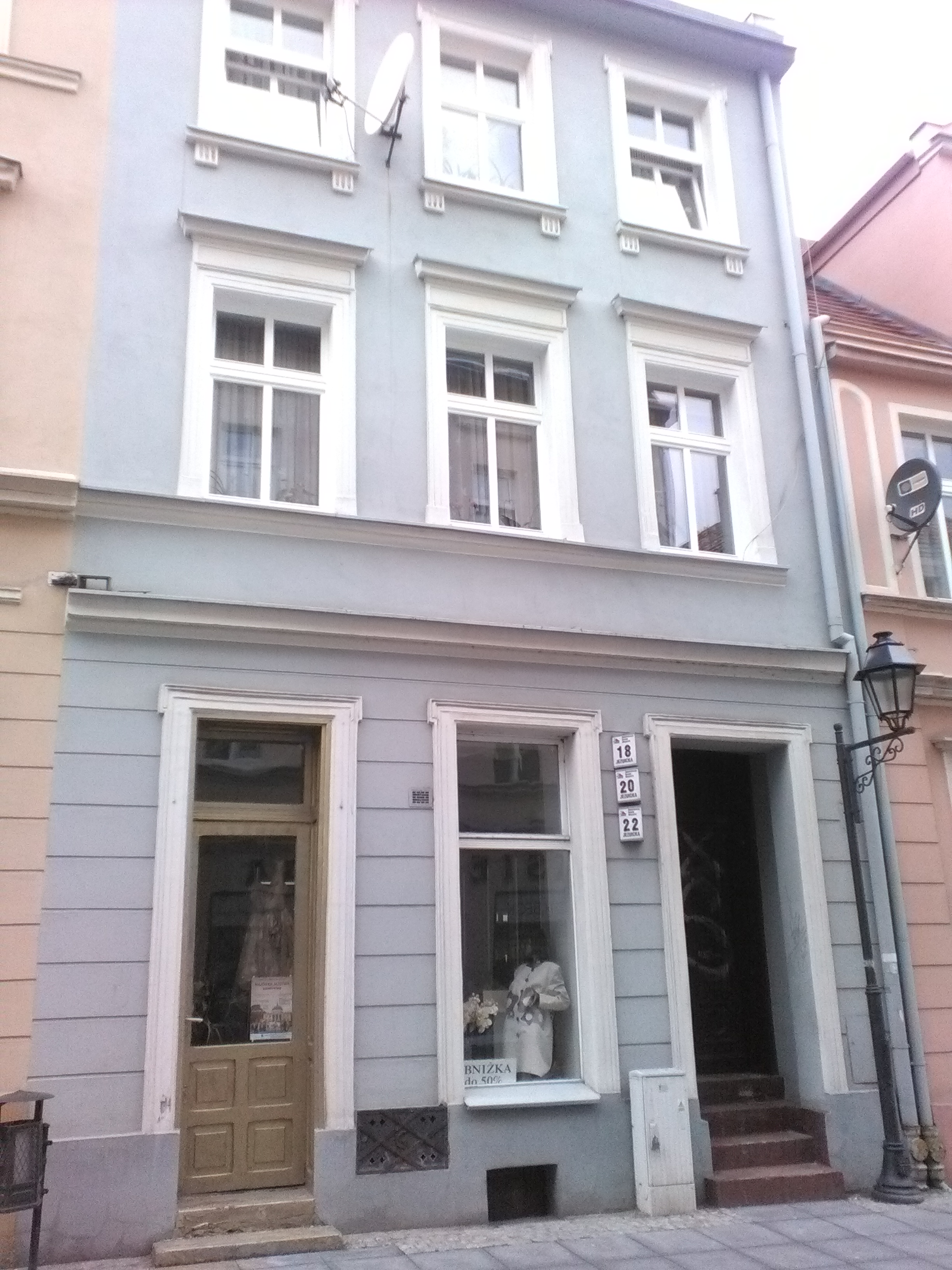
Facade at Nr.20

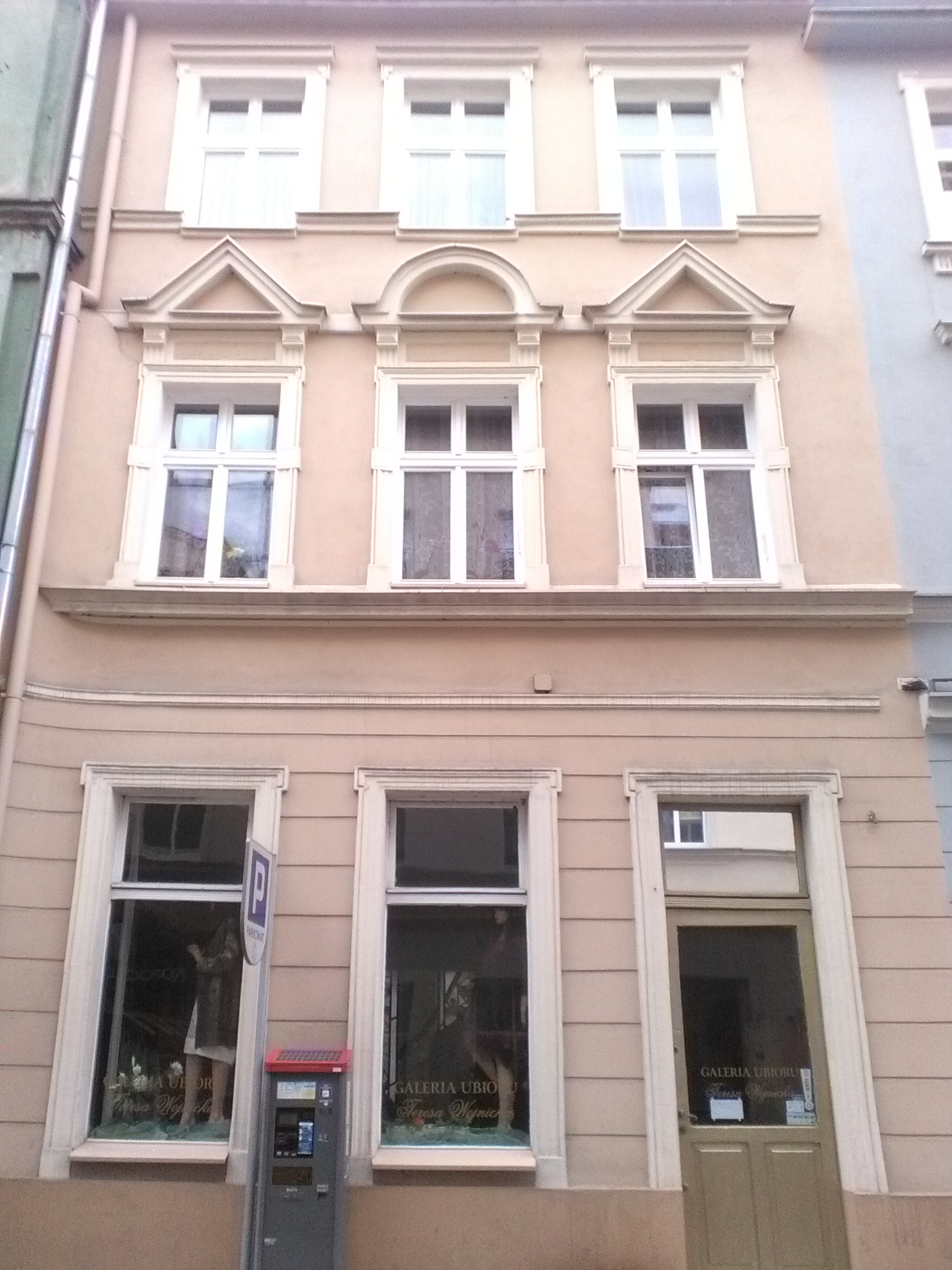
Facade at Nr.22

House at 24

18th–19th century

Neoclassical architecture, elements of Art nouveau

In the 1950s, Stanisław Hass who had previously run restaurant Cristal at Plac Wolności 1 before World War II, opened there a smaller restaurant, U Hassa (At Hasses), which closed in 1971. Nowadays, a book shop operates on the ground floor, together with municipality offices.

Main attraction of the facade is the elegant Art Nouveau portal, with curved shapes and a large transom light.

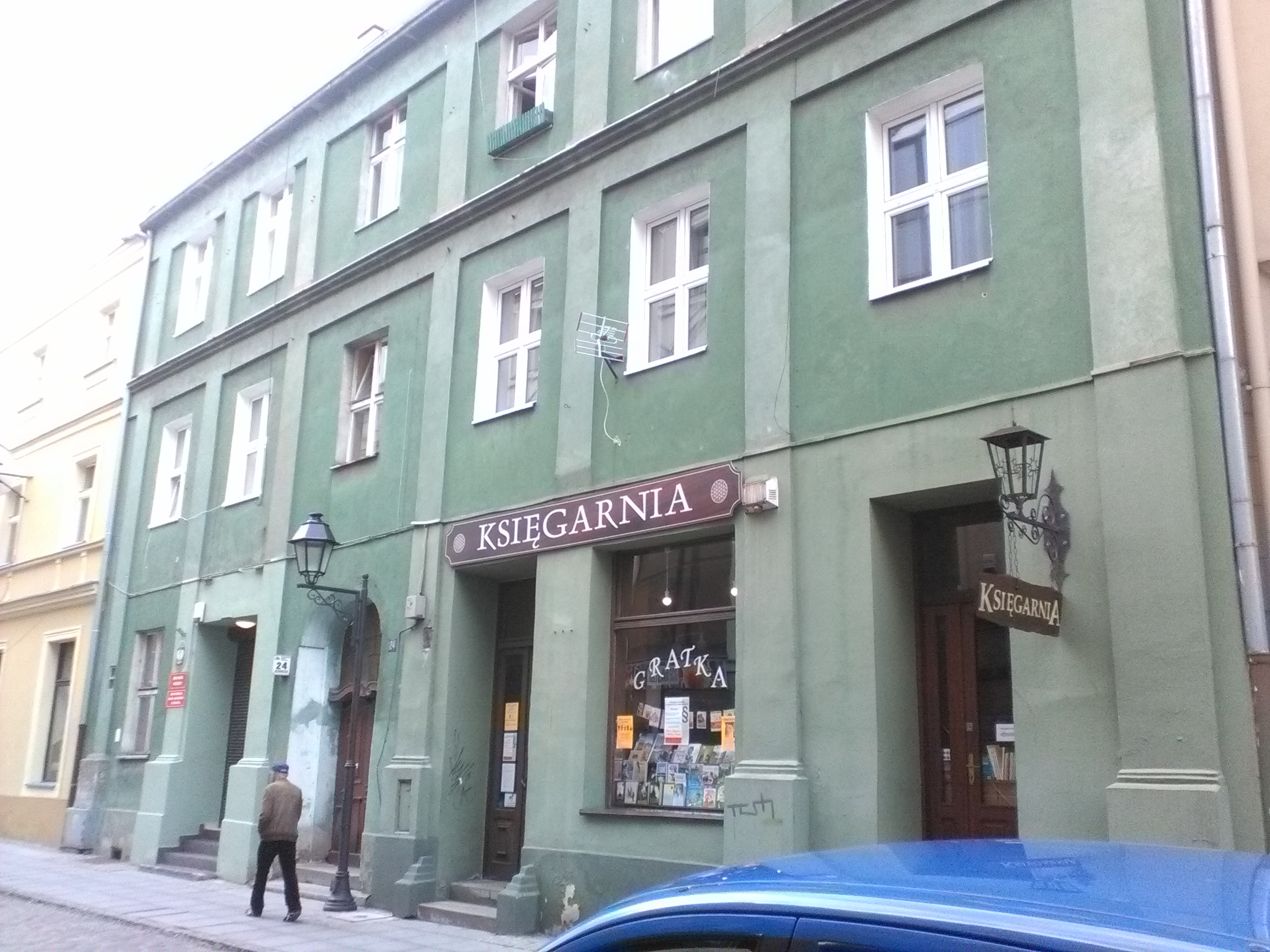
Elevation on Jezuicka street

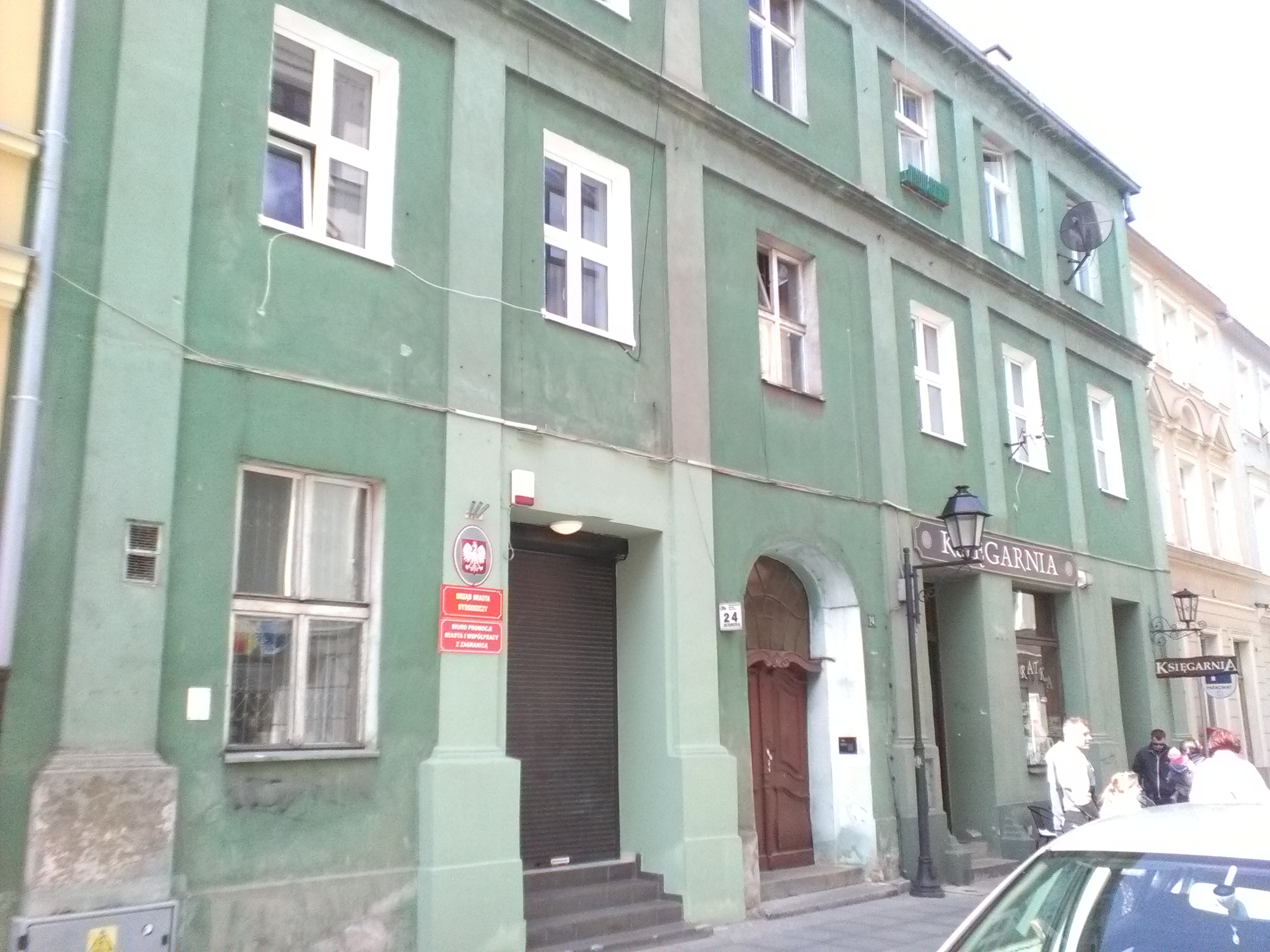
Facade on Jezuicka street

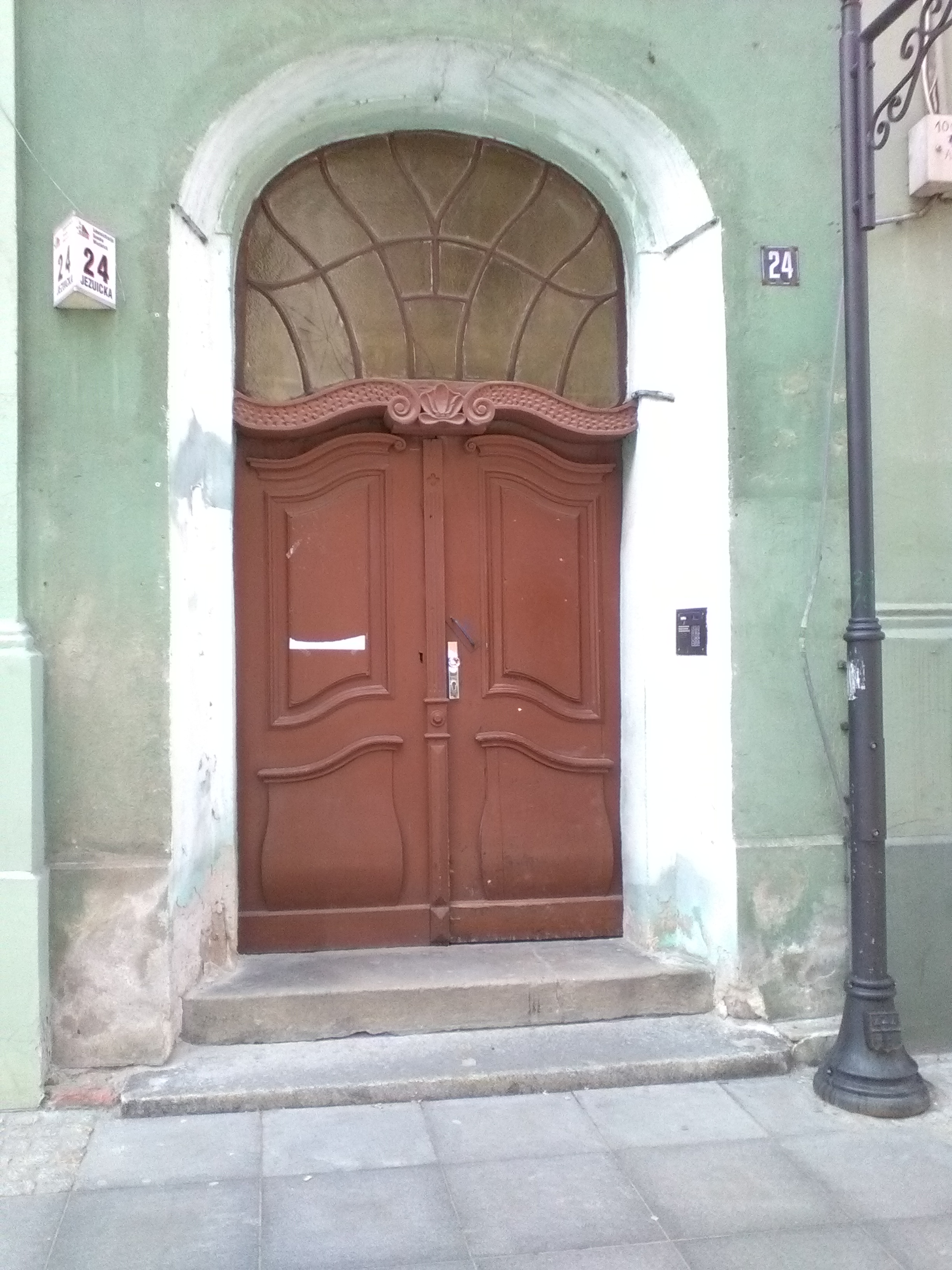
Art Nouveau portal

House at Długa street 23, corner with Jezuicka street

1776

Corner house with Długa street, refurbished in 2015. In the 1880s, the house at then Friedrich Straße 49, was owned by Mrs Flora Indig, managing a shop selling material for writing and drawing.

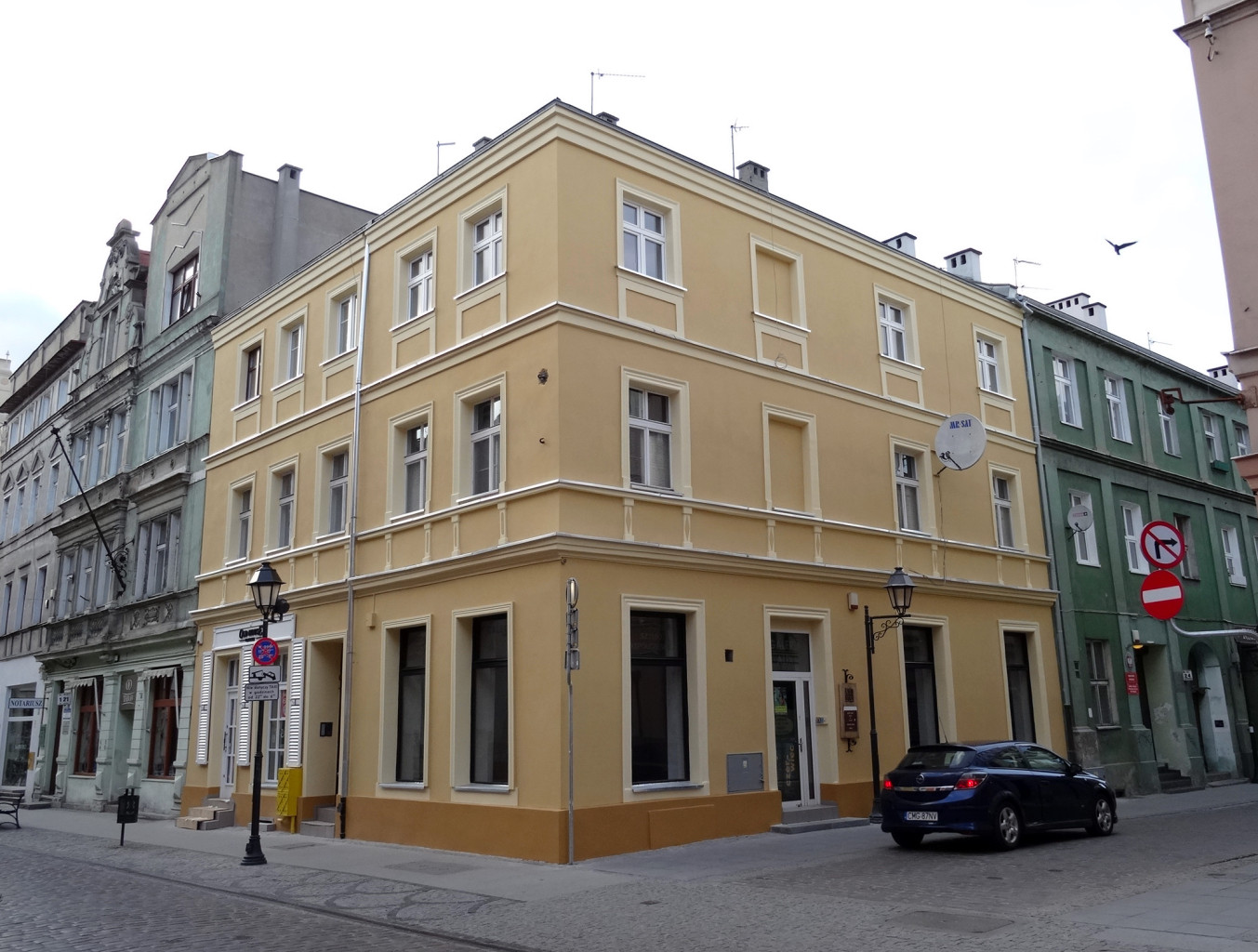
Main elevation of the corner

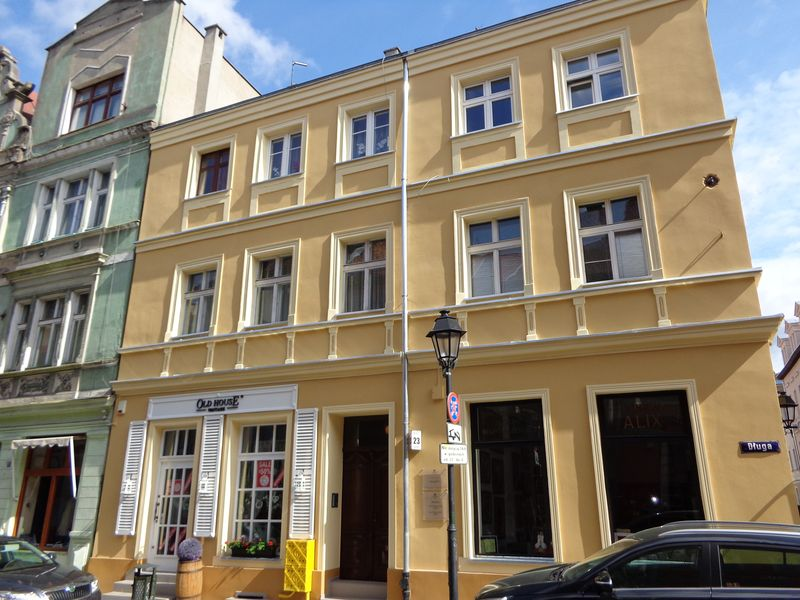
Elevation on Dluga street

== See also ==
- Bydgoszcz
- Bydgoszcz Architects (1850-1970s)

== Bibliography ==
- (in Polish) Derenda, Jerzy (2006). Piękna stara Bydgoszcz – tom I z serii Bydgoszcz miasto na Kujawach. Bydgoszcz: Towarzystwo Miłośników Miasta Bydgoszczy.
- (in Polish) Umiński, Janusz (1996). Bydgoszcz. Przewodnik. Bydgoszcz: Regionalny Oddział PTTK „Szlak Brdy”.
- (in Polish) Drygałowa, Waleria (1968). Kamieniczki nr 4 przy ulicy Jezuickiej. Kalendarz Bydgoski. Bydgoszcz: Towarzystwo Miłośników Miasta Bydgoszczy.
- (in Polish) Pawlak, Marian (2009). Kolegium Jezuickie w Bydgoszczy (1619–1780). Kronika Bydgoska XXX. Bydgoszcz: Towarzystwo Miłośników Miasta Bydgoszczy.
