= Pomeranian Leather Company "Kobra" =

Former shoemaker in Bydgoszcz, Poland

Coordinates: 53°08′08″N 18°00′33″E

Pomorskie Zakłady Przemysłu Skórzanego "Kobra"
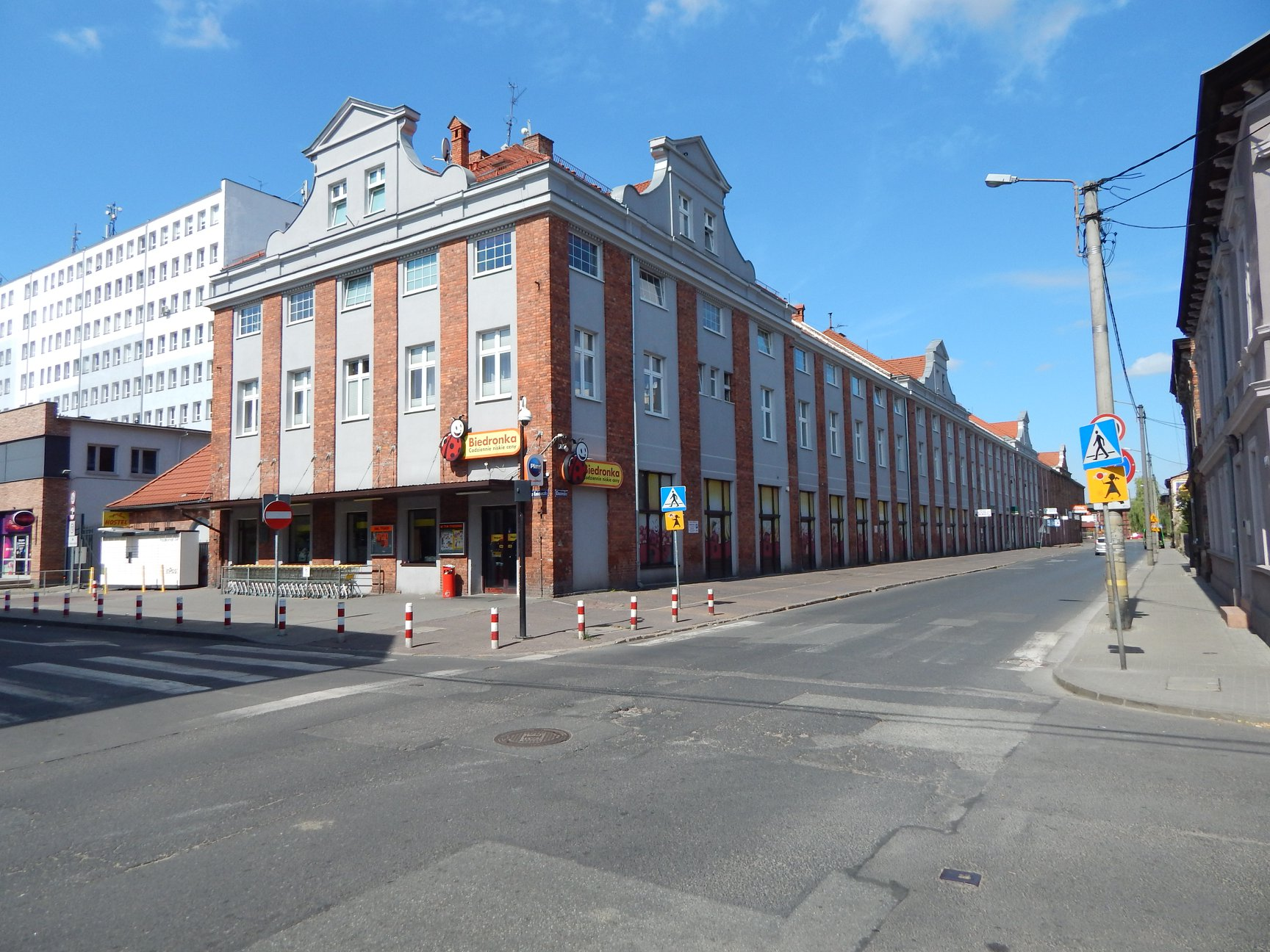
- Former building of the factory at 27 Kościuszki, Bydgoszcz
- Company type: State-owned enterprise
- Industry: Footwear
- Predecessor: "LEO" Fabryka Obuwia Spółka Akcyjna
- Founded: 1876 in Bromberg, German Empire
- Founder: Wiktor Weynerowski
- Defunct: April 1992, Poland
- Fate: Bankrupted
- Headquarters: Bydgoszcz, Poland
- Area served: Worldwide
- Products: Shoes
- Owner: State Owned
- Number of employees: 1674 (1954)

The Pomeranian Leather Factory "Kobra" is a former shoe producing company based in Bydgoszcz. The firm was one of the largest in Poland in its domain. It went bankrupt in 1992. Starting with felt shoes, the company then manufactured leather footwear, mainly for men and for uniformed services; it provided as well production and repair services for the leather industry.

== History ==
=== Prussian period ===
Initially Wiktor Weynerowski launched a furniture factory and a steam sawmill at Jagiellońska street, then at 45 Promenada street. These facilities operated till the outset of WWII, when machines and devices were dismantled and taken to Piła. On its stead, the Germans organized car workshops using the remaining buildings and halls.

The history of the factory starts in 1876, when Wiktor founded a felt footwear factory. He ran it in his modest apartment and after a few years moved to buildings at 34 Swiętej Trojcy street (non existent today) purchased from the former Byring dressing factory. In 1891, Wiktor's son, Antoni, took over the management of the company, which employed a dozen of people. In 1906, a 5 hectares (12 acres) plot of land at the corner of Kościuszki and Chocimska streets, in downtown district, was bought and Antoni asked architect Paul Sellner to design a modern factory complex. In 1912, the entire production and 300 employees were transferred to this three-story building equipped with social facilities and an elevator for goods. After Wiktor's death in 1917, the company was run exclusively by his son Antoni. A the time, the raw material for the production of footwear was mainly supplied by Ludwig Buchholz's tannery, established in 1845 on the bank of the Brda river and one of the largest leather factories east of the Elbe.

=== Interwar period ===
In the 1920s, the employment reached 200 people, and the daily production topped 200 pairs of various footwear (leather/felt/sports shoes and slippers). Leather came not only from the local Buchholz tannery in Bydgoszcz, but also from imported sources in United Kingdom, France and Netherlands.

In 1929, the company management was handed over to Antoni's sons, Henryk (as an engineer) and Witold (as a lawyer and an economist). From this date, the business related to the production changed significantly, operating as a commercial law company based on modern forms of management. In 1932, the enterprise was transformed into a joint-stock company under the branding "LEO", as a memento to Antoni's wife Leokadia, who died in 1927, and to Henryk 's and Witold's older brother Leon Teodor, who died on October 1, 1918, during the First World War at the Battle of Verdun.

During the Great Depression, production was down by 70% and employment by 80%. Fortunately, from 1934 onwards, the factory experienced a significant boom, becoming one of the largest footwear companies in Poland. Employment increased to 400 people seasonally, brand stores were opened in all major cities of Poland (i.e. Kraków, Warsaw, Lwów, Toruń and Poznań) and in Bydgoszcz in March 1932, at 15 Gdańska Street. Already, the brand "LEO" started to be known on the European market thanks to its massive export levels, with its logo portraying a stylized lion's head. A factory branch dedicated to producing military boots was established in Warsaw and land was purchased near Mielec in Małopolska where was planned the erection of a new plant in the framework of the Central Industrial Region scheme. During this period, "LEO" shoes were competing in Central Europe with the Czech Bata for the quality and the level of production.

In Bydgoszcz, other smaller footwear factories operated. One can cite:

- Mechanical Footwear Factory "Standard " (Polish: Mechaniczna Fabryka Obuwia "Standard") at Dolina street, employing 100 people;
- Footwear Factory "Minerwa" of Sigurska and Tucholska (Polish: Fabryka Obuwia "Minerwa" Sigurski i Tucholski), established in 1922, at Chrobrego street, producing daily 400 pairs of shoes.

In January 1939, the Polish Ministry of Military Affairs turned to Weynerowski's company with an order for the production of army shoes. This command was however partially completed due to the invasion of Poland in September 1939.

=== Second World War ===
After German forces entered Bydgoszcz, the factory was taken over by the Nazi occupation authorities and confiscated. A German manager was designated, Walter Krause. Like most factories, the production was partially converted to the war effort of the Wehrmacht. The Weynerowskis had fled Bydgoszcz before the arrival of the German forces and the repressions against the civilians. They reached Warsaw then Red Army-occupied Brest on the Bug river. There, on October 15, Antoni was hospitalized for exhaustion and dementia and died on November 29, 1939.

Witold and his family escaped to Netherlands while Henryk was arrested and tortured by the Gestapo. Afterwards, he moved to Konstancin near Warsaw, where he ran a thriving shoe factory, saving Poles and co-financing the Home Army.

=== PRL period ===
After the liberation of Bydgoszcz, the firm was nationalized and integrated into a new corporation gathering the former "Buchholz tannery" as well as many small private plants from pre-war time.

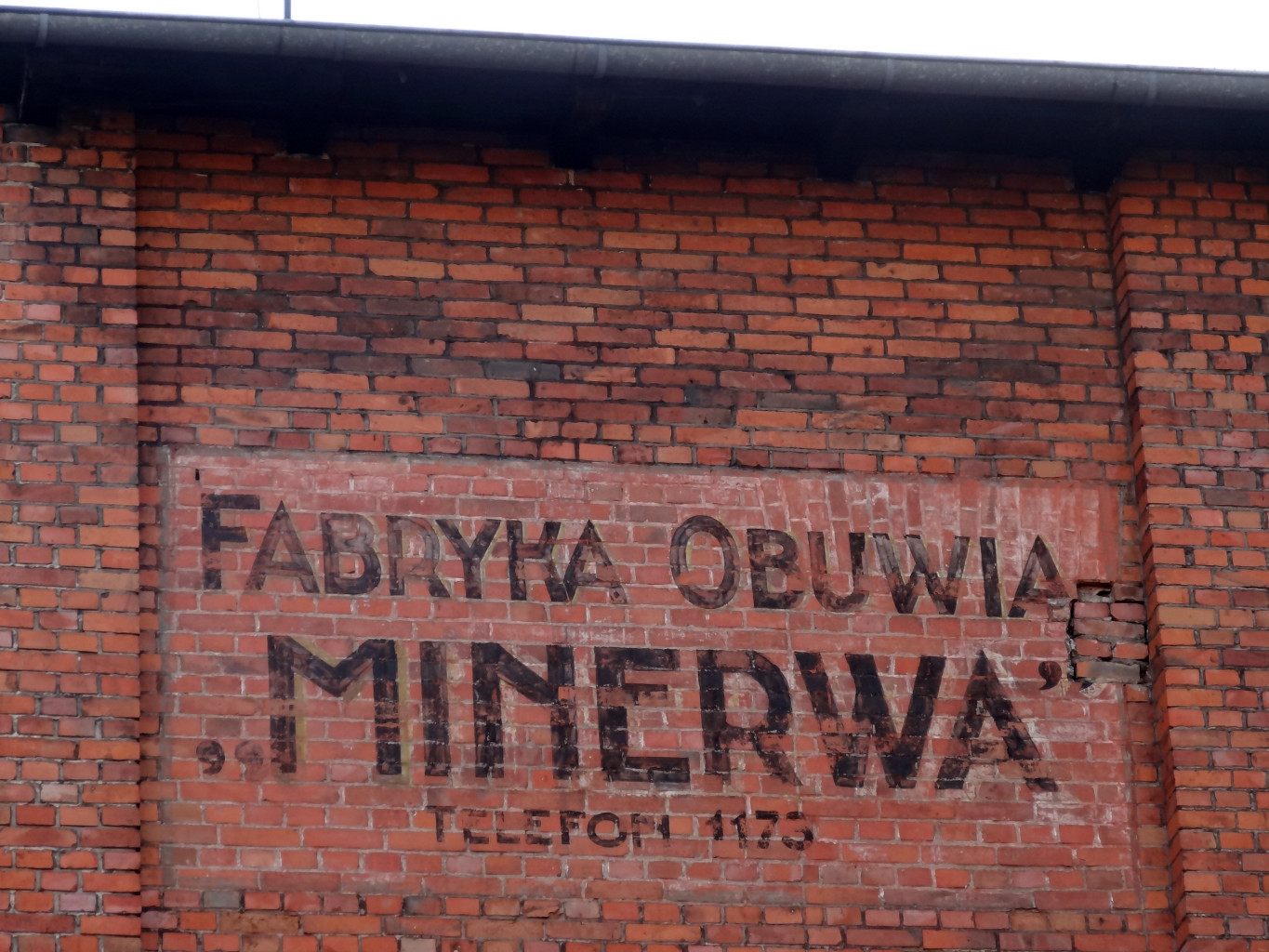
"MINERVA" mural advertising at Chrobrego street

The state-owned enterprise included factories in the leather and footwear businesses from all over the Bydgoszcz Province. It comprised:

- tanneries in Bydgoszcz, Włocławek, Rypin, Chojnice and Lidzbark;
- shoe factories in Bydgoszcz (i.e. "LEO", "Minerwa", "Junak", "Helios"), Barcin and Solec Kujawski.

In 1948, the conglomerate (Pierwsza Państwowa Fabryka Skór-State Leather Factory Nr.1) has been employing 246 people and in 1954 - 1674 people, among whom 1050 women. In the 1950s, the company was merged into the State Leather Industry Department based in Łódź. In 1956, the (ex-"LEO") factory at Chocimska street was expanded. Furthermore, the conglomerate was re-branded Pomeranian Leather Industry Plant "Kobra" (Polish: Pomorskie Zakłady Przemysłu Skórzanego-PZPS "Kobra") in 1960.

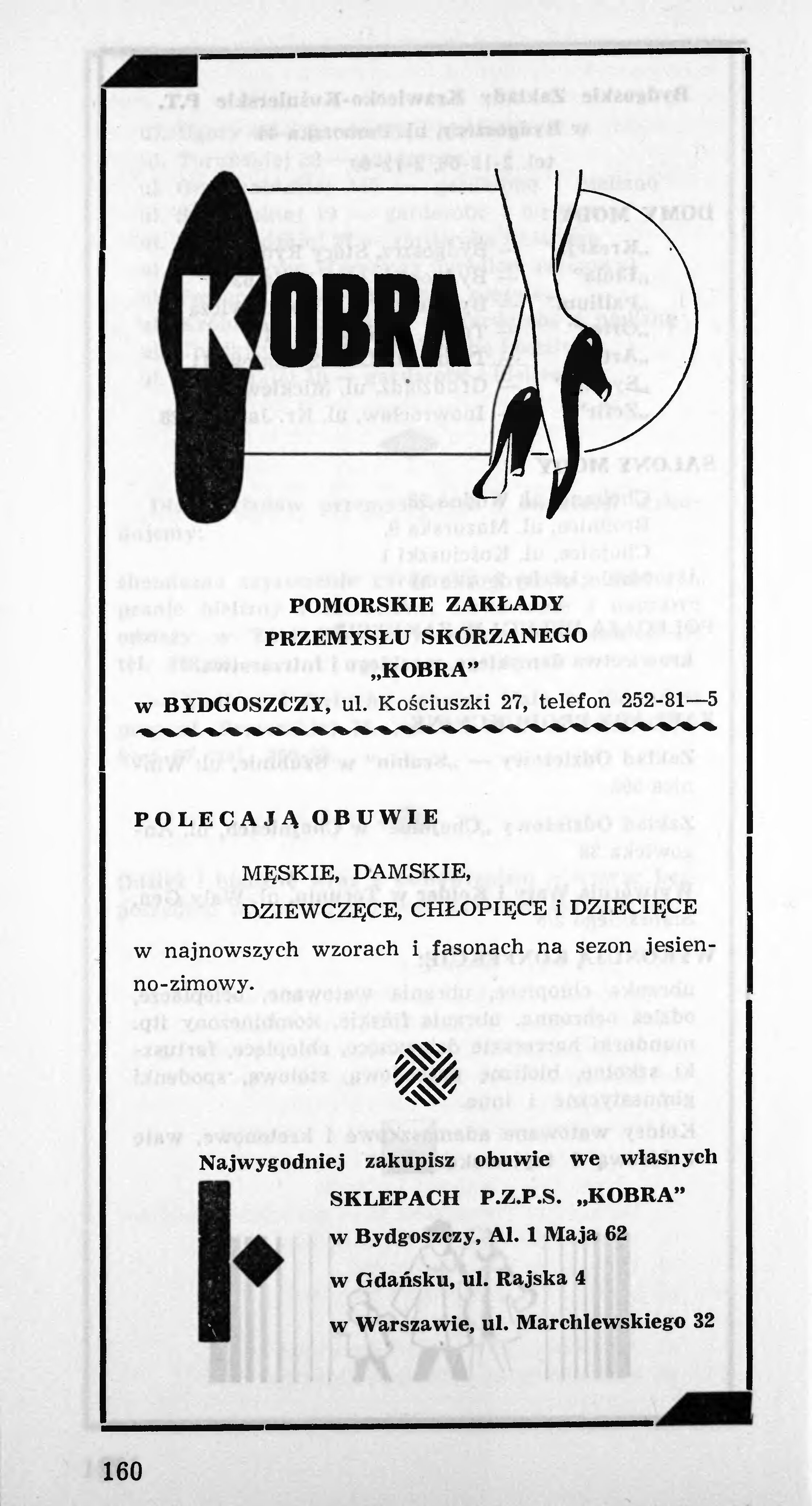
Advertising for "Kobra" in 1968

In the 1960s, most machines and devices were obsolete to follow the pace of modern technologies. The conglomerate was in deficit deepened by rigidly calculated selling prices, mismanagement and an extensive inadapted production.

A large scale modernization of the machinery was undertaken from 1975 to 1980, in plants of Bydgoszcz and Solec Kujawski, where imported production line was introduced. Hence the manufacture of shoes using glue and polyurethane soles could be launched. No new factory, however, was constructed: as a consequence, the fumes and the downtown location made operations harmful to the environment. Working conditions at "Kobra" factory were harsh in the cramped and old pre-war plants, with a dense and noisy machinery and a poor ventilation system unable to filter the glue vapours. Some efforts were made to improve these poor working conditions in the 1970s as an office building and a new production hall (inter alia) were erected next to the plant at Kościuszki street. In addition, "Kobra" main warehouses were moved closer, at 102 Gdańska Street. The factory was one of the most feminized plants in Bydgoszcz.

On the one hand products intended for export had to passed several quality control tests several times as a warranty of high workmanship, on the other hand footwear delivered to local retail usually was plagued with lower quality. In 1976, 26 to 33% of the production was targeted by consumer complaints: it was, however, the same level of poor qualitative indicators that one could measure in other plants at the time of the Polish People's Republic. The 1970s saw an improvement in production technologies, thanks to imported raw materials and semi-finished items. The "Kobra" brand was known and appreciated in Poland and socialist countries, praised for their durability and design. Frequently, one can see constant queues of customers in front of the company shop at 62 Gdańska street, where were sold in particular the so-called "export rejects".

Through the 1970s and the 1980s, mainly men's shoes were manufactured in a classic design. The plant delivered approximately 13,000 pairs of shoes a day, including 1600s pairs for uniformed services (Polish State Railways, State Fire Service, Milicja Obywatelska and ZOMO). Regular exportations targeted USSR and United Kingdom, where 53% of production was shipped to from Solec Kujawski's plant in the 1970s. Smaller quantities were exported to West Germany, France, the Netherlands, Afghanistan, Kuwait, Barbados, Angola, Libya and Ghana. Poles often used "Kobra" footwear abroad (e.g. USSR, Hungary) as a means to barter goods which were in short supply in Poland such as gold, color televisions, sweaters, electronic watches, etc.

=== Post-PRL time and collapse ===
In 1991, when market economy took over the country, Far East cheaper footwear combined with the collapse of exports to USSR left "Kobra" unable to compete, burdened with extensive infrastructure and large workforce and it found itself in a dire economic situation. Trade unions refused to reduce the workforce and no changes were carried out (commercialization, or privatization) in the firm.

In April 1992, the bankruptcy of "Kobra" was declared, leading to a cessation of operations on August 31 and the entire personnel was laid off. In 2006, the company PZPS "Kobra" was suppressed from the National Court Register.

== Naming ==
- 1876–1891 – W. Weynerowski – Fabryka Obuwia w Bydgoszczy
- 1891–1929 – W. Weynerowski i Syn – Fabryka Obuwia w Bydgoszczy
- 1929–1932 – W. Weynerowski i Syn Jawna Spółka Handlowa, Fabryka Obuwia w Bydgoszczy
- 1932–1939 – "LEO" Fabryka Obuwia Spółka Akcyjna
- 1939–1945 – "LEO" Schuhfabrik A.G. Bromberg
- 1945–1960 – Bydgoskie Zakłady Obuwia (included in "Państwowa Fabryka Skór" or "State Leather Factory")
- 1960–1992 – Pomorskie Zakłady Przemysłu Skórzanego-PZPS "Kobra"

== Commemorations and miscellaneous facts ==
- In September 2012, for the 100th anniversary of the establishment of the Weynerwoski shoe factory and the 20th anniversary of "Kobra" collapse, a commemorative plaque has been unveiled. Placed above the factory gate at 27 Kościuszki street, it has been realized on the initiative of the Society of the Enthusiasts of the City of Bydgoszcz (Polish: Towarzystwo Miłośników Miasta Bydgoszczy).

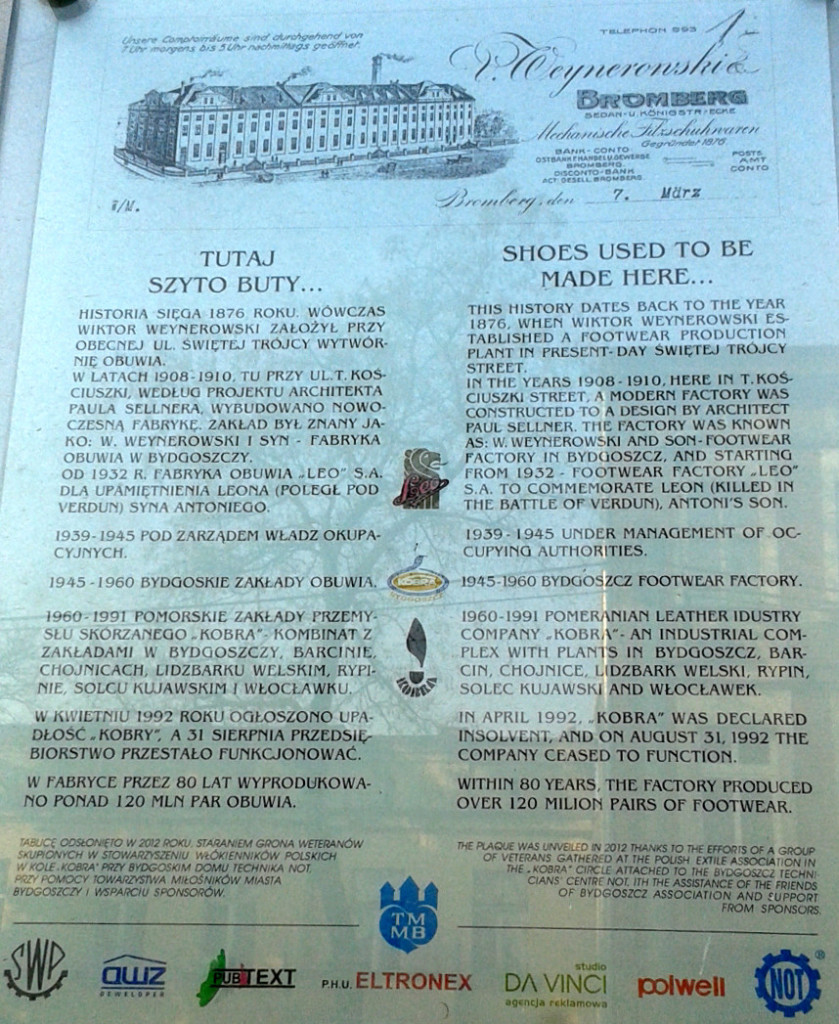
Commemorative plaque at Kościuszki street

- Since 2013, former employees of the factory have collected exhibits (tools, devices for the production, various souvenirs, documents, shoe elements, forms, dies) to hand them over to a would-be leather museum on the premises of the former tannery plant at Garbary Street.
- The plant ceased its operations on August 31, 1992. During its 80 years of existence, the factory has produced over 120 million pairs of shoes.
- In its heyday, the "Kobra" company employed about 4,000 employees (including 3,000 in Bydgoszcz) and produced 3 million pairs of shoes per year.
- The area of the former Buchholz tannery in Bydgoszcz (which became in 1945 a branch of "Kobra") houses today the campus of the University of Economy.
- The villa of Witold Weynerowski, the co-owner of the "LEO" factory, still stands today at 16 Kopernika street. The house displays a Dutch style, in reference to Witold's wife, Julia née Kessler, who was from the Netherlands.
- The former warehouses of "Kobra" at 102 Gdańska street have been converted in the 1990s into apartments.
- The original name of the plant was planned to be Pomerania instead of Kobra.
- In June 1934, the "Leo" sports club was established at the factory, with several sections, among others women's games, table tennis, boxing, cycling and football. In November 1934, the club got its own utility room for table tennis and a makeshift boxing ring at 109 Gdańska street, at old factory premises.
- Antoni Weynerowski had a strong policy of social activism and philanthropy. His sons followed the paths taken by their parents in Bydgoszcz towards charitable activities. Henryk organized Sunday trips for the factory personnel and their families, to local recreational places (Koronowo, Borówno, Myślęcinek). Christmas tradition in the factory was to meet under the Christmas tree, each of the employees receiving a gift.

== See also ==
- Bydgoszcz
- Antoni Weynerowski
- Eastern Bloc Economies

== Bibliography ==
- (in Polish) Andrzejewski, Roman (2008). "LEO" od Weynerowskich. Kalendarz Bydgoski. Bydgoszcz: Towarzystwo Miłóśników Miasta Bydgoszczy.
- (in Polish) Grysińska, Katarzyna (2021). Weynerowscy - od butów i dobrych uczynków. Kronika Bydgoska XLI. Bydgoszcz: Towarzystwo Miłosnikow Miasta Bydgoszczy. pp. 157–181.
