= Kaliszewski =

Kaliszewski is a Polish surname. Notable people with the name include:

- Jerzy Kaliszewski (1912 – 1990), a Polish actor
- Władysław Kaliszewski (1886 - 1964), a Polish insurgent, soldier in the Polish Army
