= Retired Enlisted Association =

Non-profit organization

- Founded: 8 February 1963; 63 years ago
- Founders: George Skonce and Dean Sorell
- Type: nonprofit 501(c)(19) organization
- Region served: United States
- Website: Official website

The Retired Enlisted Association (TREA) is a 501(c)(19) non-profit organization of the United States. Its mission is to enhance the quality of life for uniformed services enlisted personnel of the United States, their families and survivors - including active components, Reserves, and National Guard, and all retirees.

== Background ==
TREA was founded by retired Master Sergeants George Skonce and Dean Sorell. Together with other retired enlisted personnel they met at the Ent Air Force Base Non-Commissioned Officers' Club in Colorado Springs, Colorado to form The Retired Enlisted Association on 18 February 1963. Today the organization has 65 active chapters in the United States.

The Retired Enlisted Association has maintained tax-exempt status since June 1984.

TREA is incorporated in Colorado and has a congressional charter under Title 36 of the United States Code. It is governed by a volunteer Board of Directors (BOD) elected by the general membership. Any enlisted person, retired from an active or reserve component of the United States armed forces, either for length of service or permanent medical disability is eligible for membership.

In 2018, TREA Memorial Foundation agreed to spend $425,000 on programs benefiting veterans and to dissolve, after allegations it misled donors about using contributions to buy phone cards for service members and their families.

In 2023, TREA reported $643,997 in revenue, $701,707 in expenses, and $3,363,472 in total assets; contributions were reported as $319,522.
