= Władysław Kaliszewski =

Polish soldier (1886–1964)

- Władysław Kaliszewski
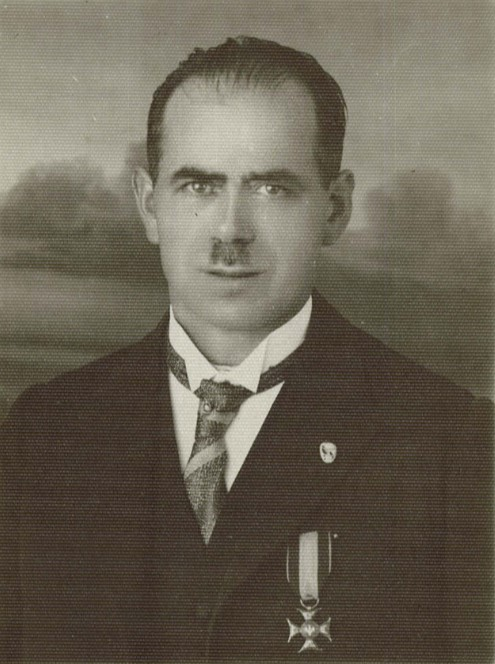
- Władysław Kaliszewski
- Born: May 5, 1886; Września, Province of Posen Prussia
- Died: July 29, 1964 (aged 78); Bydgoszcz, Poland
- Resting place: Nowofarny Cemetery in Bydgoszcz
- Occupations: National Activist, merchant, banker, soldier in the Polish Armed Forces
- Known for: Insurgent during the Greater Poland uprising
- Spouse: Salome Poszwalda
- Children: Gabryela, Felicja, Janina, Maria, Stefania, Aleksandra, Jerzy
- Awards

Signature
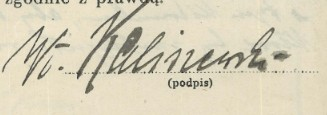

Władysław Kaliszewski (1886-1964) was a Polish insurgent, soldier in the Polish Army and a knight of the Order of Virtuti Militari.

== Biography ==
=== Early life ===
Władysław's parents were Franciszka née Krall (2 March 1853 - 4 December 1927) and Karol Kaliszewski (2 November 1843 - 19 January 1905), a carpenter. He had many siblings:

- six sisters: Jadwiga, Wiktoria, Zofia, Antonina, Marianna and Halina;
- two brothers: Leon and Kazimierz;
- two half-sisters: Helena and Stanisława.

Władysław was born in Września, where after finishing primary school, he started training as a carpenter, like his father. He followed this trade until the outbreak of World War I. He was a member of the Sokół patriotic movement.

=== First World war (1914-1918) and Greater Poland uprising (1918–1919) ===
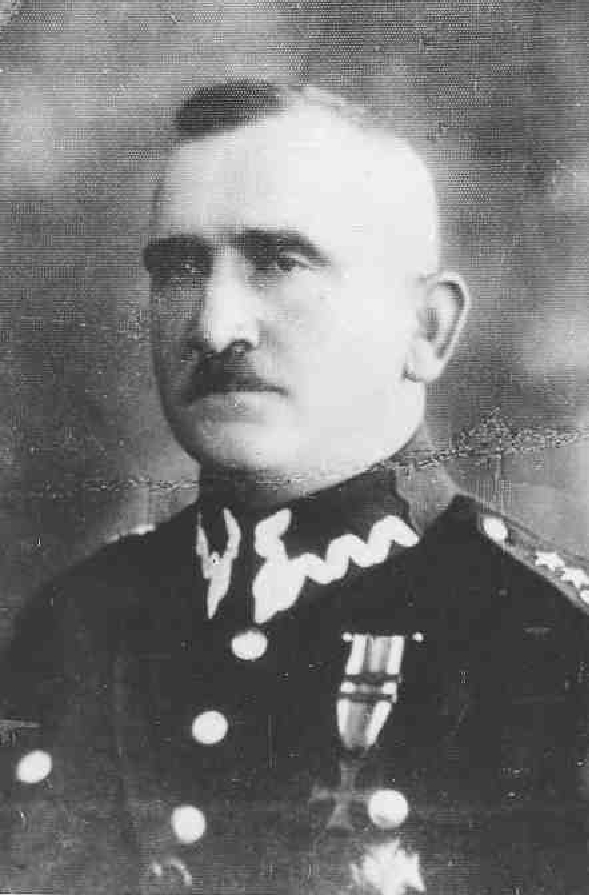
Trawinski Jozef, commanding the 1st Września Company

During the world conflict, he served in the Imperial German Army, fighting on the eastern front and in France. At the end of the war, he was demobilized and returned to Września.

On 6 January 1919, Władysław joined as a volunteer the 1st Września Company, commanded by Józef Trawińskione. The company was one of the Polish insurgent units. He took part in skirmishes against Grenzschutz Ost, a paramilitary volunteer formation established in 1918-1919, operating on the eastern borders of the Weimar Republic together with similar German troops (Freikorps or Selbstschutz). Władysław also fought in battles in Szubin and Rynarzewo, participating in the Uprising until its end (16 February 1919).

Returning to civilian life in March 1919, he took up work as a clerk at Września administration offices (magistrat).

=== Polish–Soviet War ===
In June 1920, Kaliszewski volunteered for the army and went to the Polish–Soviet front with the 268th Volunteer Battalion of the Wrzesińska Legion (Legia Ochotnicza Wrzesińska). The battalion then joined into the 66th Kashubian Infantry Regiment (66 Kaszubski Pułk Piechoty): Władysław served as a private in the 1st company.

In the Polish-Bolshevik war, Władysław distinguished himself on 14 September 1920, during the Battle of Horodec (in today's Belarus), during which he commanded a reconnaissance patrol spotting enemy's positions. During the exchange of fire, he received a severe gunshot wound to the left lung: he nonetheless remained at his post, maintained discipline in his unit and helped repelling a counterattack by Soviet forces. He only left the ranks on the direct order of his platoon commander.

For this act of bravery, Władysław Kaliszewski was awarded the Silver Cross of the Order of Virtuti Militari. The decree officializing this medal was signed by Marshal Józef Piłsudski, then Commander-in-Chief of the Polish Armed Forces.

=== Second world war and later life ===
Kaliszewski was demobilized in 1921, with the rank of Private first class. He subsequently took up a position at the Merchant-Industrial Bank of Września (bank kupiecko-przemysłowy). With the economy decline, he was out of work for some time, but in the following years he opened a tobacco shop in Września.

He was socially active as an active member of various associations:

- the "Sokół" Polish Gymnastics Society. He stood as the president of the local branch between 1922 and 1937;
- the Greater Poland Insurgents' Association (Związek Powstańców Wielkopolskich);
- the Western Borderlands Defense Association (Związek Obrony Kresów Zachodnich);

In the meantime, Władysław obtained the title of engineer.

In 1937, he moved to Bydgoszcz to work at the state sawmill. During German occupation in WWII, he worked as a day worker in a construction company, Richard Mielke, based at 22 Dworcowa street.

At the end of the conflict, Kaliszewski worked at the Bydgoszcz Municipal Office as an accountant. He was as well active at the local Municipal Construction Association.

Living at 3 Przyrzecze street, he retired in 1956. Władysław Kaliszewski died in Bydgoszcz and was buried at the Nowofarny Cemetery in Bydgoszcz.

== Family ==
Władysław married in 1918 was Salomea née Poszwald (31 October 1886 - 18 March 1967). The couple had 7 children, six daughters and one son:

- Gabryela (born 1920);
- Felicja (born 1924);
- Janina (born 1926);
- Maria (born 1927);
- Stefania (born 1928);
- Aleksandra (born 1929);
- Jerzy (died infant in 1932).

== Orders and commemorations ==
- Silver Cross of the Virtuti Militari: no. 4676, 3 February 1922.
- Cross of the Greater Poland Uprising (Wielkopolski Krzyż Powstańczy): no. 07.19-0.148, 19 July 1960.

== See also ==
- Bydgoszcz
- Sokół movement
- Partitions of Poland
- Resistance movements in partitioned Poland (1795–1918)
- Freikorps

== Bibliography ==
- Życiorysy powstańców wielkopolskich: K - tom ll /Kaliszewski Władysław - Karasiński Jan [Biographies of the Greater Poland insurgents: K - volume ll / Kaliszewski Władysław - Karasiński Jan] (in Polish). Poznań: Zarząd Okręgowy Związku Bojowników o Wolność i Demokrację w Poznaniu. 1963.
- Jankiewicz, Wacław (1929). Zarys historji wojennej 66-go kaszubskiego pułku piechoty im. Marszałka Józefa Piłsudskiego [Outline of the military history of the 66th Kashubian Infantry Regiment named after Marshal Józef Piłsudski] (in Polish). Warszawa: Wojskowe Biuro Historyczne. pp. 31–32.
