= Przyrzecze Street, Bydgoszcz =

Street in Bydgoszcz, Poland

Coordinates: 53°07′19″N 17°59′53″E

Przyrzecze street
Bydgoszcz
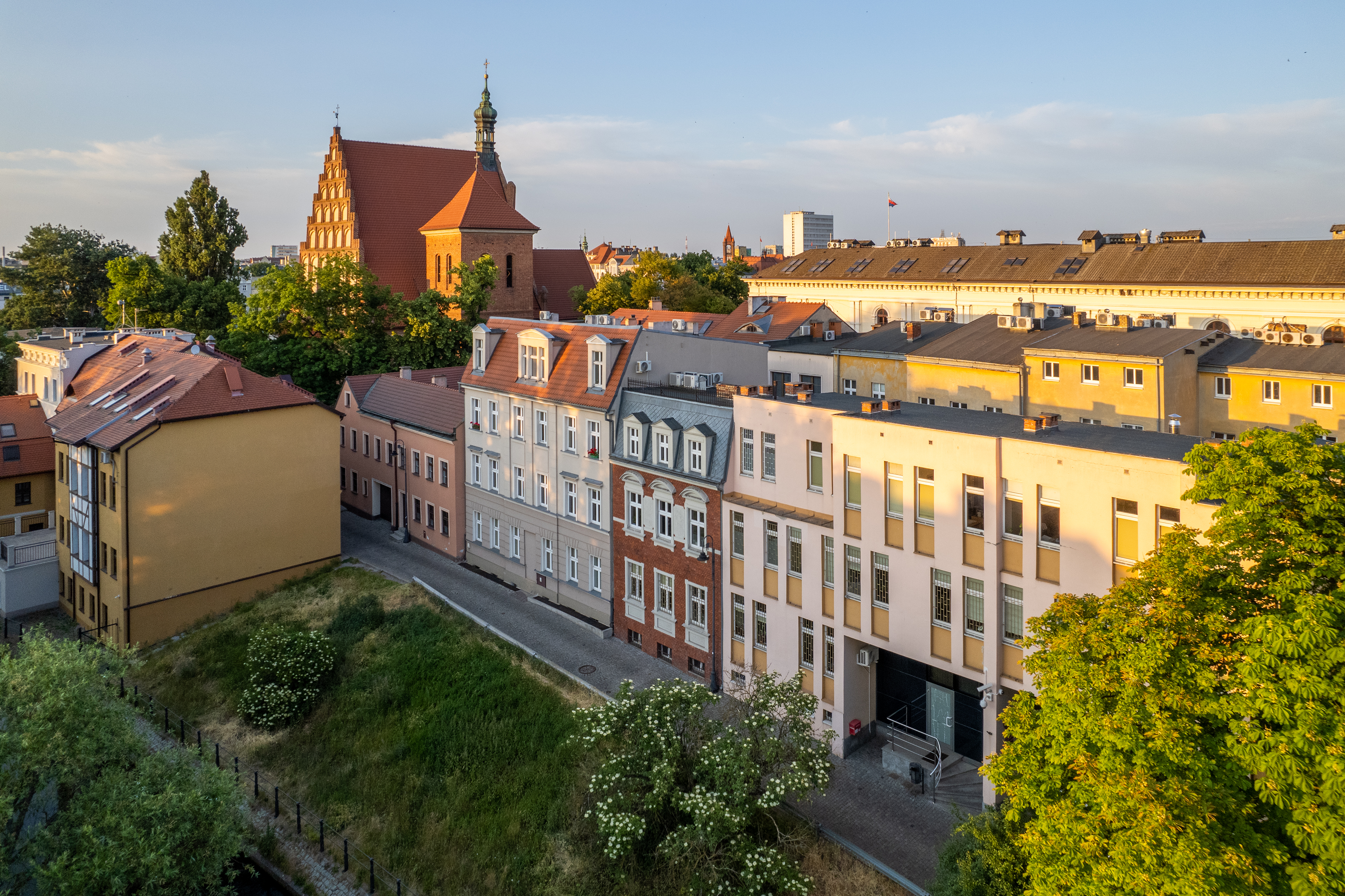
- Bird's-eye view

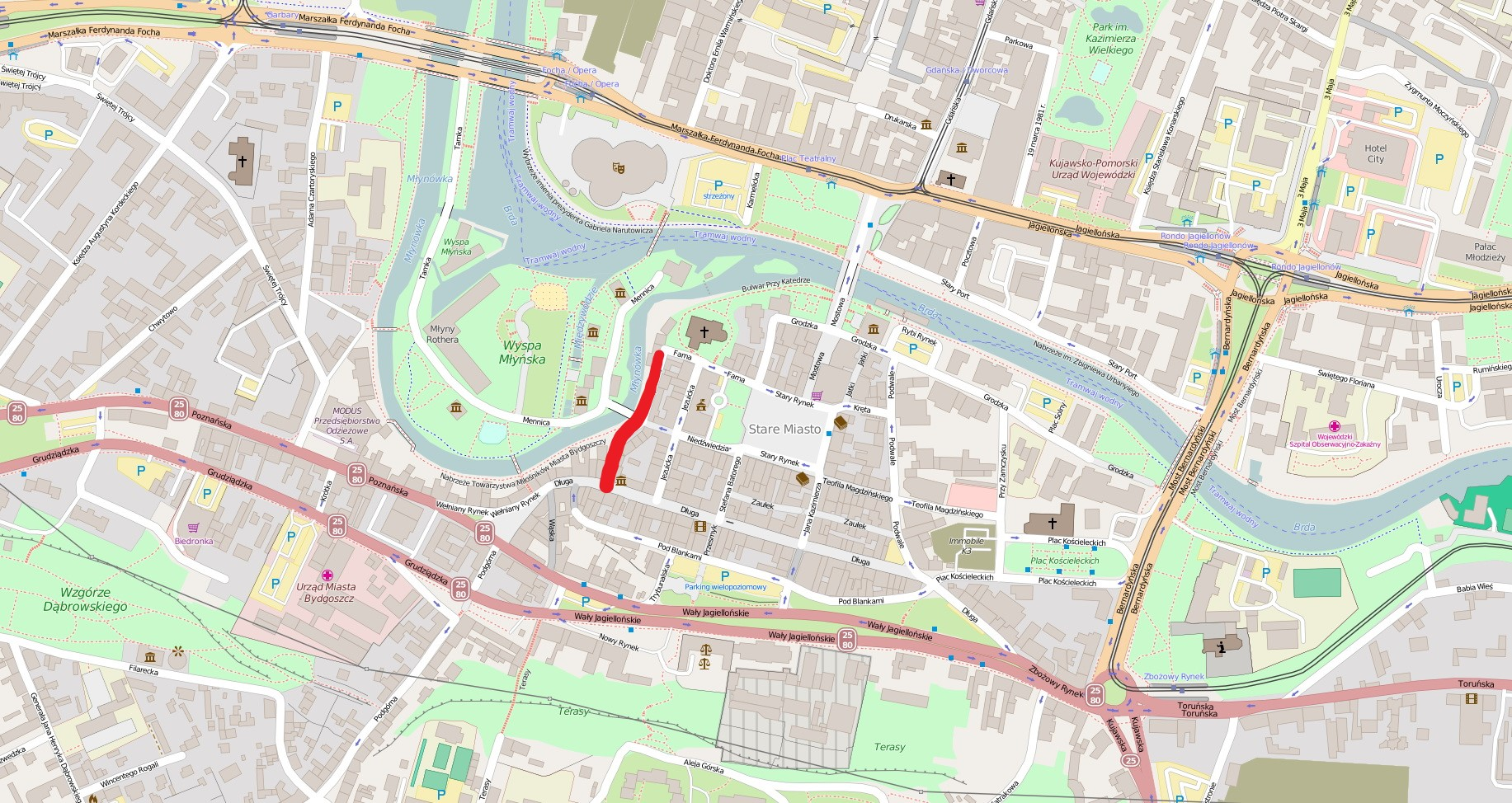
- Location on a city map
- Native name: Ulica Przyrzecze w Bydgoszczy (Polish)
- Former name: Brahe gasse
- Part of: Bydgoszcz
- Owner: City of Bydgoszcz
- Length: 160 m (520 ft)
- Area: Old Town
- Location: Bydgoszcz, Poland

Przyrzecze street is a street located in the old town district of Bydgoszcz, Poland. Many of its buildings are part of Bydgoszcz local history. Due to the proximity of the river, its townhouses represent a picturesque urban complex.

== Location ==
The street is located in the western part of Bydgoszcz old town, along Młynówka (transl. Mill River), a branch of Brda river which borders Mill Island on its western, southern and eastern sides. The short street (160m long) runs roughly on a north–south axis, from Farna Street to Długa street. The street connects with Mill Island via the Mill Bridge (Polish: Most Młyński), which has been standing on this spot since 1791, but has been re-built many times.

== History ==
=== Period prior to Poland partitions (1795) ===
Przyrzecze Street was laid out in the middle of the 14th century, during the formation of Bydgoszcz Old Town. It ran on the western outskirts of the city of Bydgoszcz, on the border of the Młynówka branch.

At that time, the street was connected in the north to Grodzka Street and to the Młyńska Bridge (at the very spot of today's foot bridge leading to Opera Nova). At the end of the 18th century, with the extension of the cemetery around the Cathedral, Przyrzecze street northern tip ended to Farna Street, as it is nowadays.

During an archaeological rescue survey carried out in the area, fragments of a wooden structure were unveiled. Presumably, it was a wood-covered street, running along the banks of the Młynówka river, including:

- Relics of the pavement discovered at a depth of 1.6 metres (5.2 ft) to 1.7 metres (5.6 ft) below today's surface;
- Remnants of a wooden water pipe pointing towards the river;
- Below the wooden layer, ceramics from the end of the 14th century.

=== Prussian period ===
On the first detailed plan of Bromberg, realized in 1774 by Prussian geometer Greth, most of the buildings on Przyrzecze street are located on the southern part, near Długa street. In the northern part, houses were only present in the eastern frontage, as backsides of tenements located on parallel Jezuicka Street. Like today, the northern area of Przyrzecze street gently slid down to the river, offering a public access to water collection.

On a plan of the city from 1876, the development of the street is similar as today, with townhouses on the eastern side, and industrial buildings on the west side. Indeed, the city expanded during the second half of the 19th century along the Brda river and many industrial plants such as tanneries, breweries and distilleries began to emerge here. Frontages with odd numbers were the back of houses on Jezuicka street and even numbers were borne by building courtyards giving onto Młynówka river, as one can still observe today along the water side (Venice of Bydgoszcz).

=== Interwar Period and German occupation ===
The street, by its seclusion and its design became a refuge for Bydgoszcz outcasts, even during German occupation of the city. Hence, the renaming of the alley between 1939 and 1945, as Flunderweg (from the muddy flounder fish).

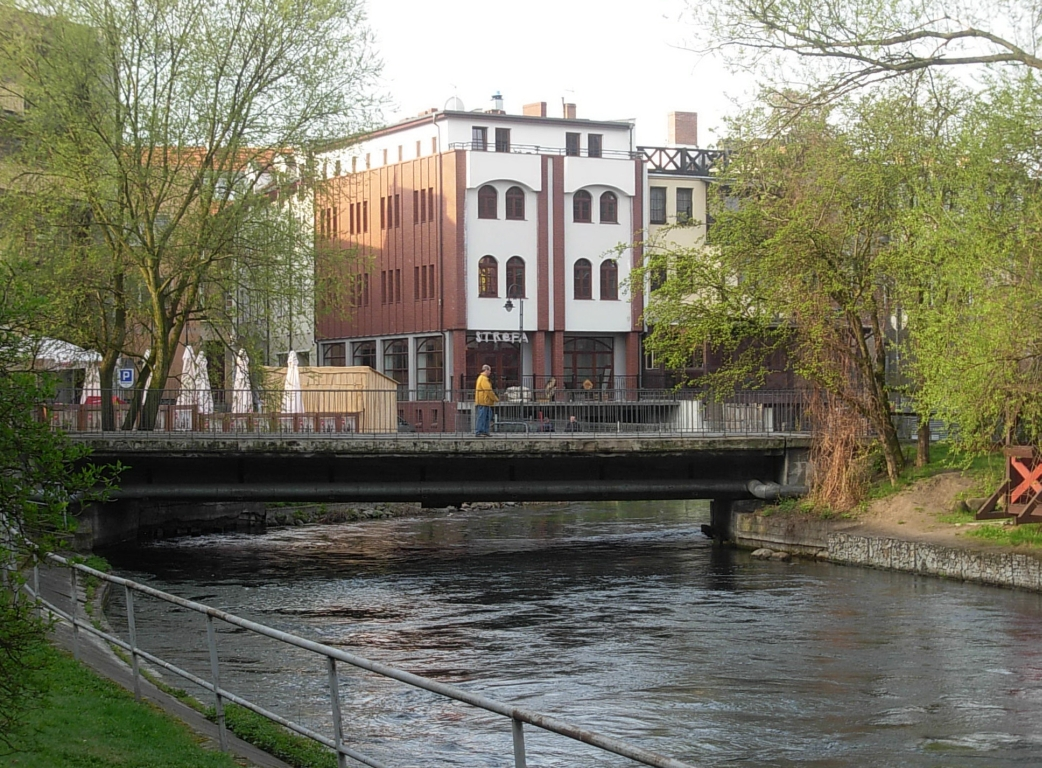
Mill Bridge and Przyrzecze street elevations

=== Postwar period ===
After the second World War, real estate, nationalized, fell into ruin. In the 1970s, Przyrzecze street was considered as one of the ugliest in the city, primarily because it did not give onto the Brda river. In 1974, a city authorities decided to reconstruct this area, as part of the overall plan to "renovate Old Town old buildings". Works started first with Jezuicka and Przyrzecze streets and the first modernized buildings were completed by 1980.

In 1990, several houses on the Młynówka river have been demolished, such as Przyrzecze 5 and a wattle and daub water mill that stood near the bridge leading to Mill Island. Between 2000 and 2010, four houses were built on their plots, as a continuation of the Venice of Bydgoszcz water front.

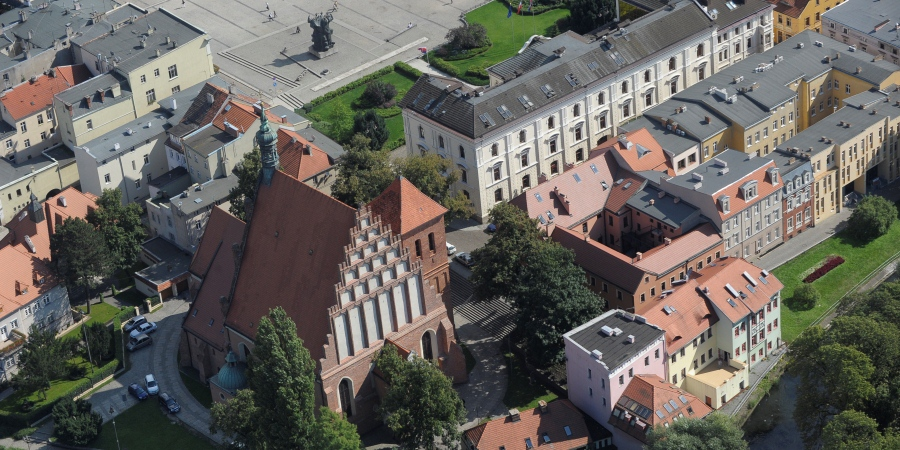
Bird's-eye view with the cathedral (left), Przyrzecze street (foreground) and parallel Jezuicka street (backdrop)

At the beginning of the 21st century, tenement houses on the eastern frontage have been refurbished, with City Hall offices and other institutions moving in. In 2010, Przyrzecze street was included in the Revitalization Plan of Bydgoszcz.

=== Naming ===
Through history, the street bore the following names:

- From the 16th century to first half of the 18th century, Platea aquatica (Latin, Water street);
- 1750–1840, Wasser Gasse (German, Water street);
- 1840–1920, Brahegasse (German, Brahe Alley, Brahe was the Prussian name of Brda river);
- 1920–1939, Ulica Przyrzecze;
- 1939–1945, Flunderweg;
- Since 1945, Ulica Przyrzecze.

Current street name refers to the proximity with the Młynówka river. In Polish, Przyrzecze means By the river (przy-rzeka).

== Main places and buildings ==
Przyrzecze Street, adjacent to the Młyńska river and Mill Island, is part of the eastern side of the Venice of Bydgoszcz. Some tenement houses dates back to the 18th century and have been remodeled, others have been erected during the renovation of the area in the 1990s.

Tenements at 2/4

1866 (Nr.2), 1820s (Nr.4)

Eclecticism, Neoclassical architecture

The plot on Nr.2, then Brahegasse 9, was purchased by a tan leather, Michał Zamoiski; his son, Frederick continued to run the workshop. In 1846, Ludwig Casimir Buchholz, a master tanner from Koronowo bought the tannery. To keep the pace with his successful business, Buchhloz extended the activity to current Garbary Street 2, along the main branch of Brda river. The house at Przyrzecze 2 was then rented: first tenant was a shoemaker and his workshop. The Buchholz family owned both properties till 1922.

The plot at Nr.4 has first been a storage area (German: speicher) when constructed. In the 1890s, the area was referenced as a garden, or as non built, even in the 1930s

Today, the ensemble houses the District Prosecutor's Office of Bydgoszcz-North (Polish: Prokuratura Rejonowa Bydgoszcz-Północ). The architectural complex comprises:

- a neoclassical building at Nr.2 (grey facade), topped by stuccoed frieze;
- an eclectic house at Nr.4 (yellow facade), with the wooden main door, featuring a transom light with stained glass motifs. Its roof displays two nice eye dormers;
- a modern edifice (green elevation), added later to Nr.4.

During the winter 2017/2018, the ensemble of buildings of the street giving onto the river will undergo a restoration.

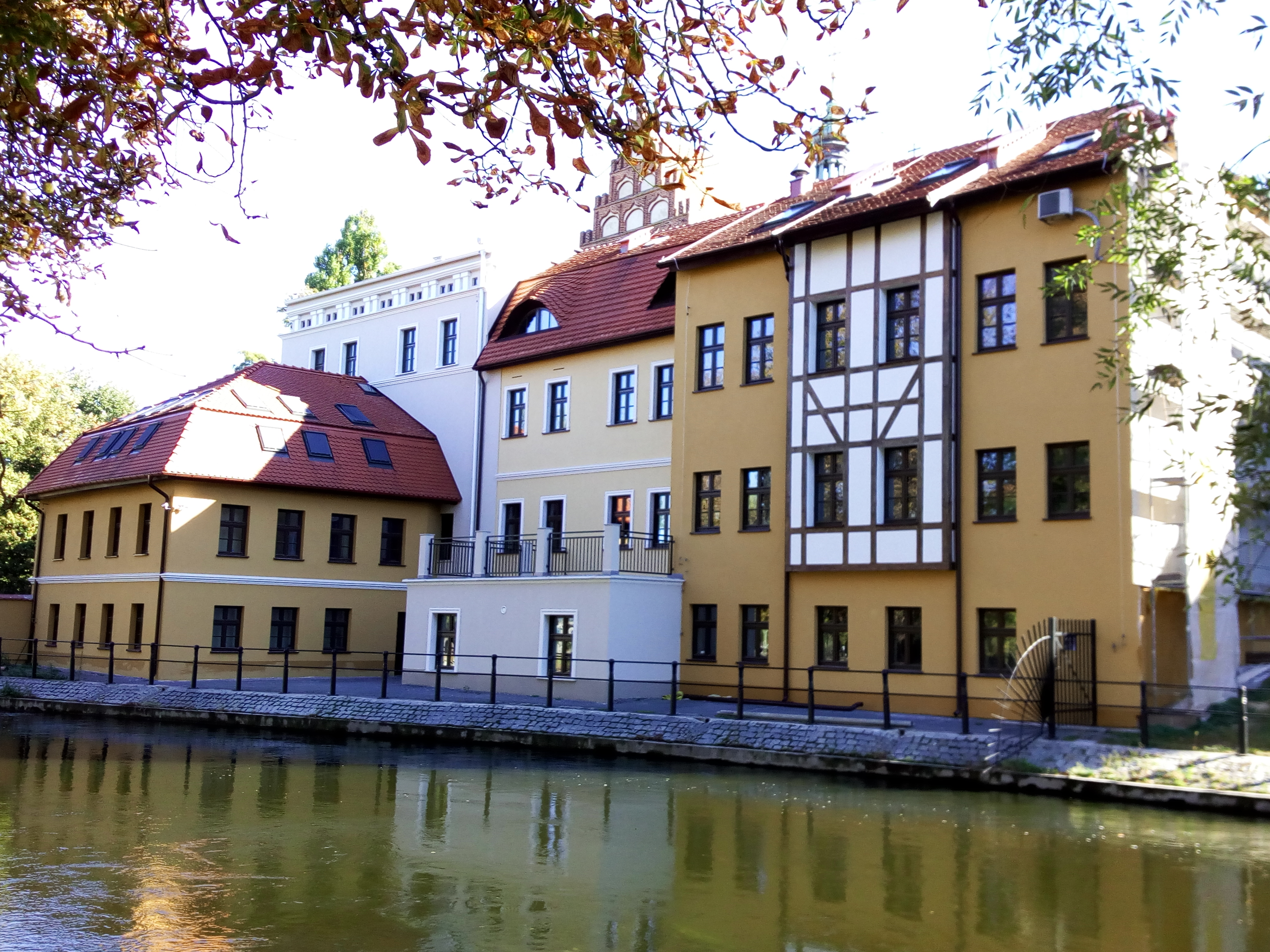
Facades on Młynówka river

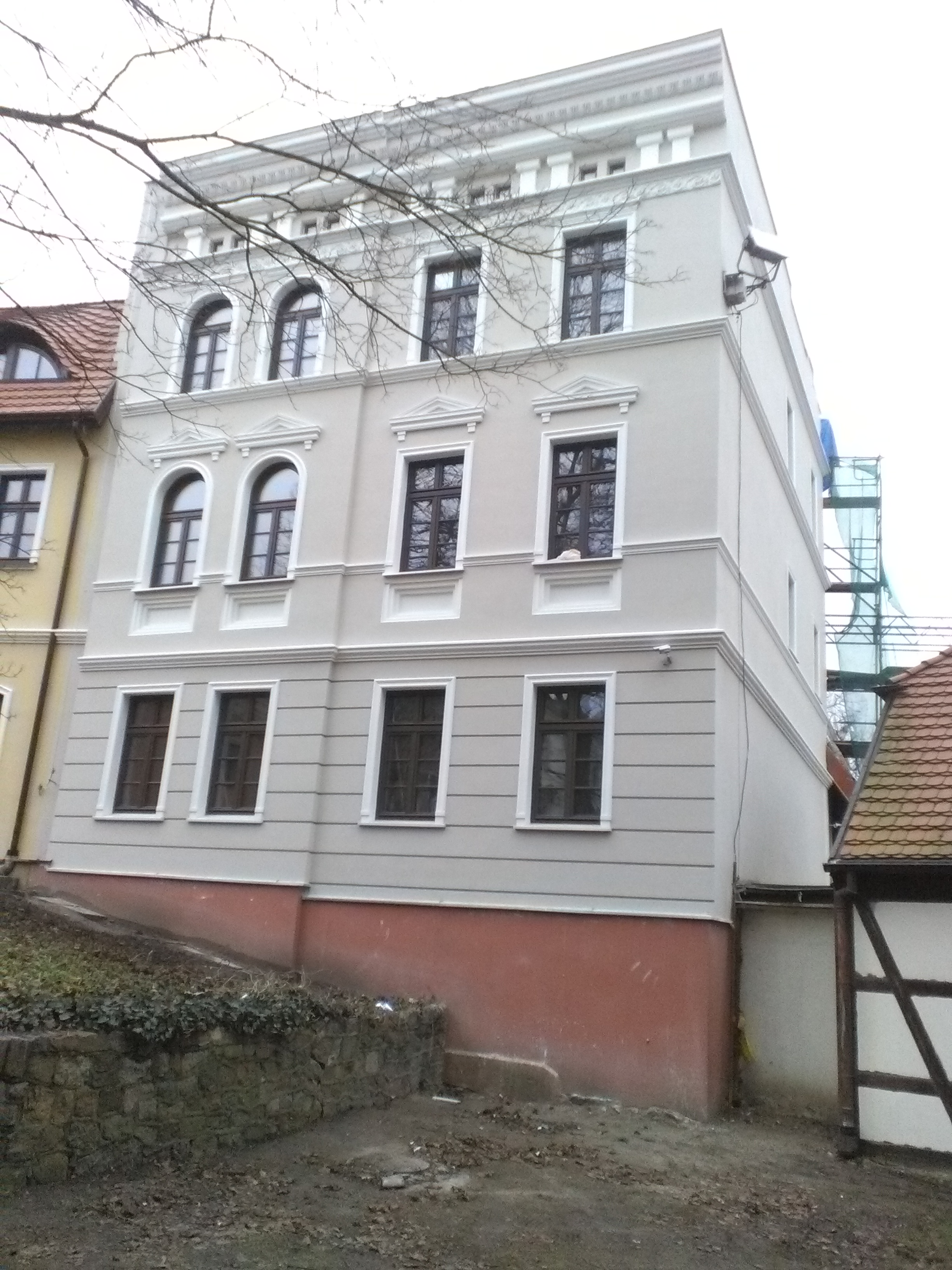
Facade at Nr.2 from the street

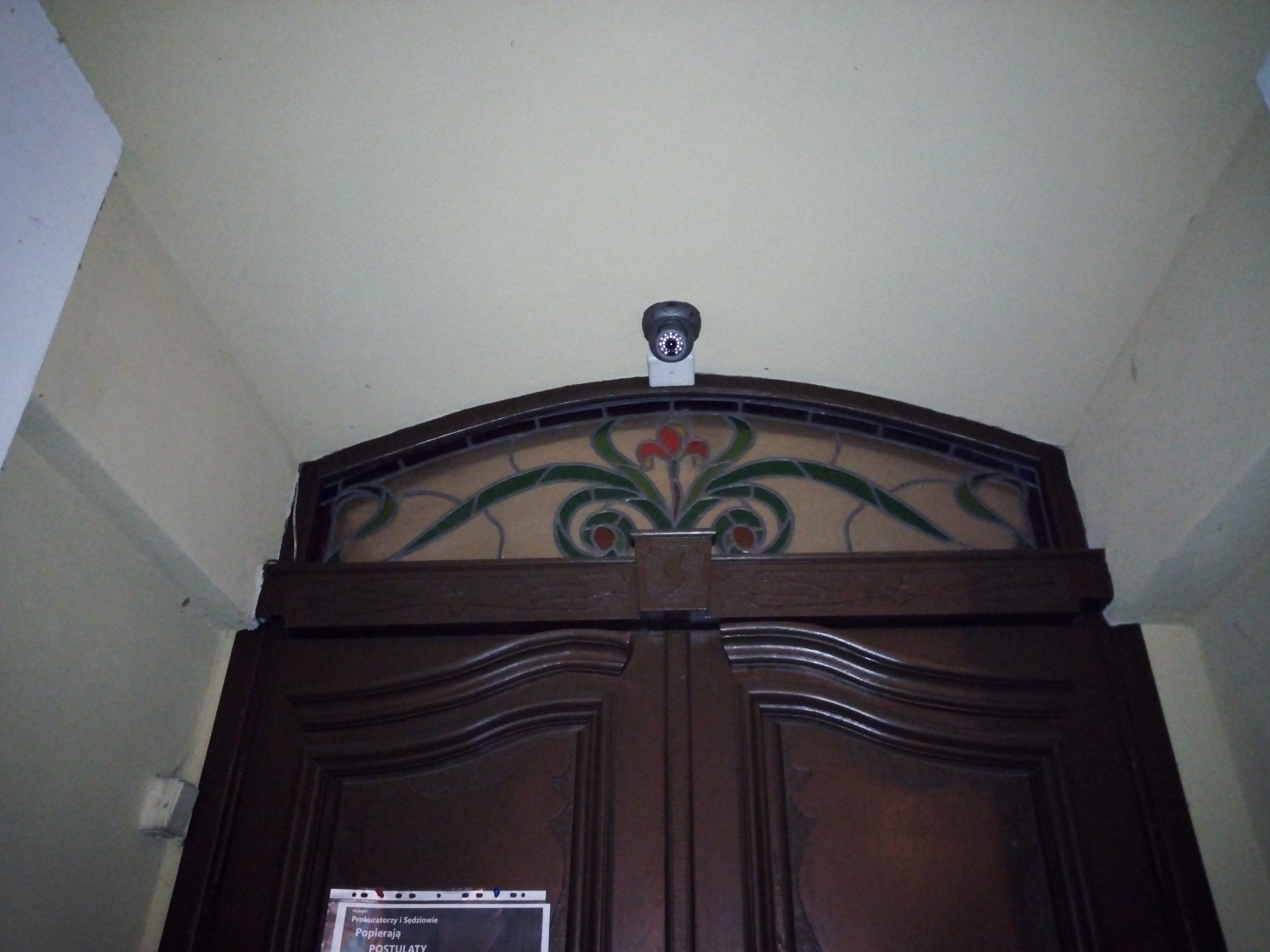
Transom light at Nr.2

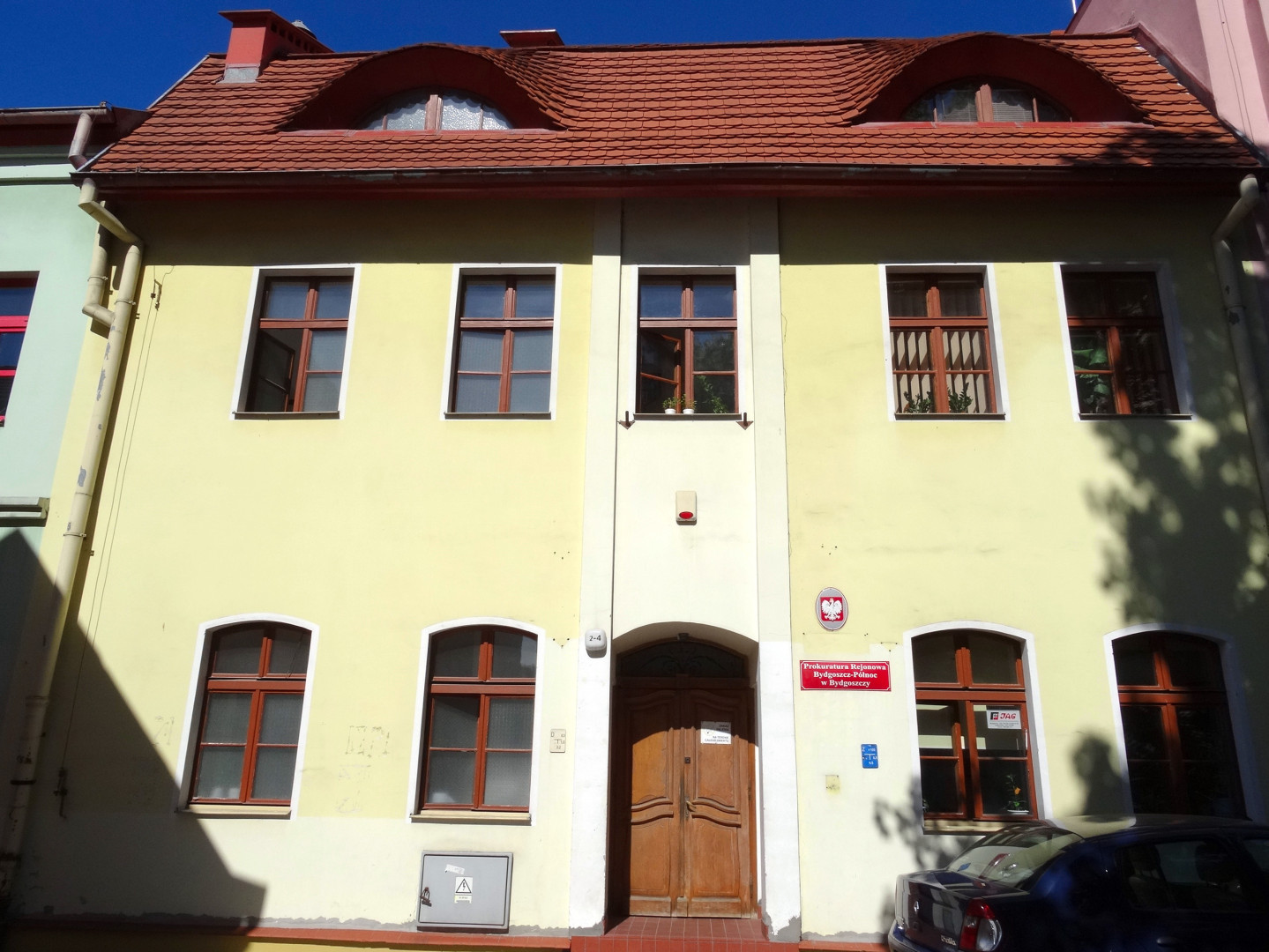
Nr.4 from the street

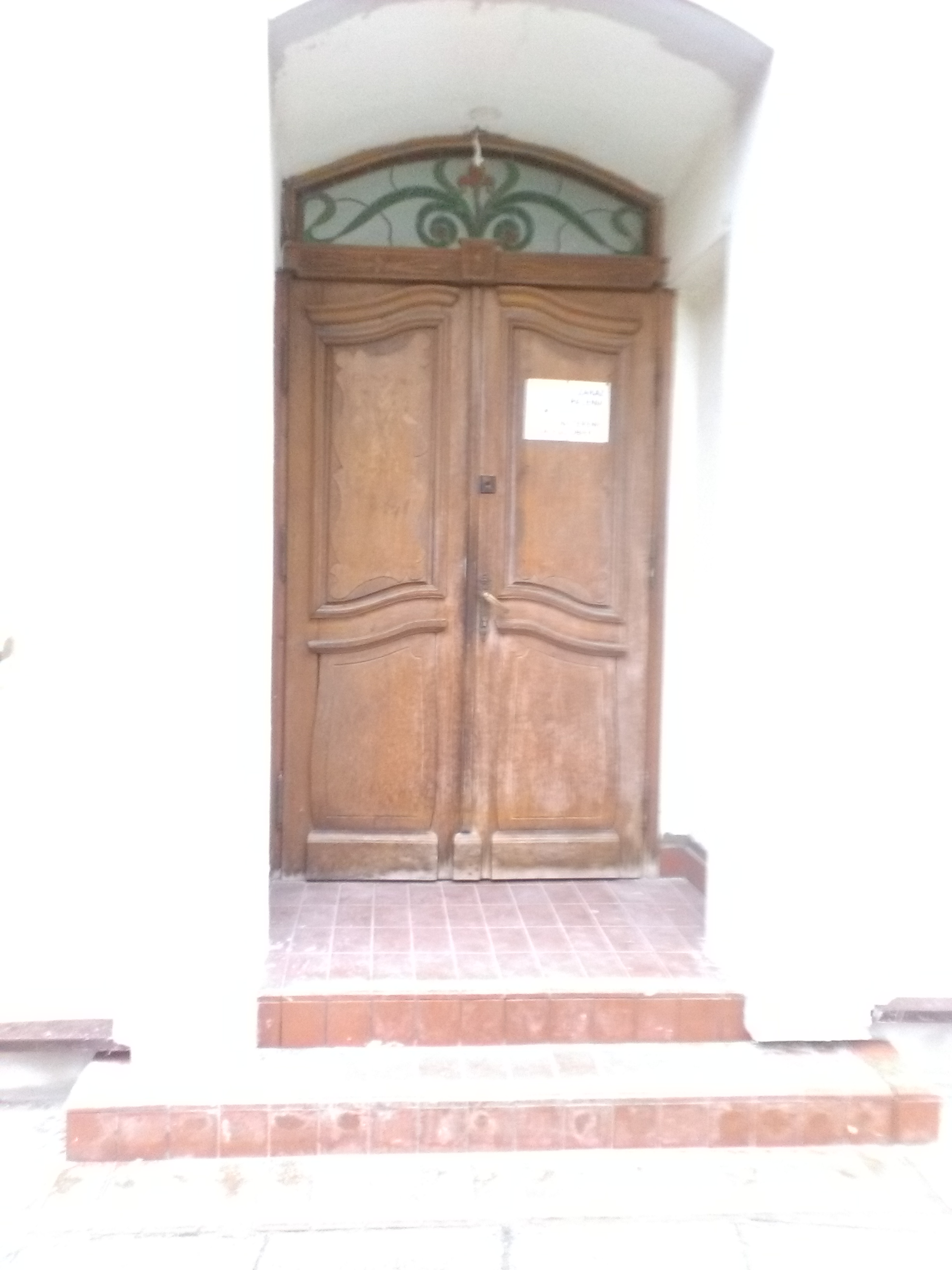
Main door of Nr.2/4

Tenement at 5 now gone

19th century

The property at Nr.5, then Brahegasse 12, was associated with house at Neue Pfarstraße 12, today's Jezuicka Street 4, as an outbuilding. Buildings were razed in 1990.

Tenement at 6 now gone

1834-1855

Eclecticism

Property at N.6 was once a garden falling to the river, attached to a tenement at Jezuicka Street 4. In 1839, the owner, Frederick Wilhelm Kutzer, a tanner, sold the garden to Wilhelm Ferdinand Miller, a merchant who built a house here. His son transformed the house to a steam bath on stilts over the river, similar to the one he had already at N.8. In 1870, this property was purchased by Paulina Ventzki. Following landlords were investors: rentier Maaß, cooperative owner August Albrecht and merchant Franciszek Buczkowski, who had a cheese dairy shop at the Old Market. The edifice was rebuilt in the 1930s.

The tenement was a real icon of the Venice of Bydgoszcz, till its demolition in 1990. Building side on the river displayed two-storey, with characteristic galleries running all along the facade: as such the house was known as"The Gallery (Polish: Galeriowiec). The edifice comprised also an attic and two side wings. Today the plot is empty, with a lawn overlooking the river.

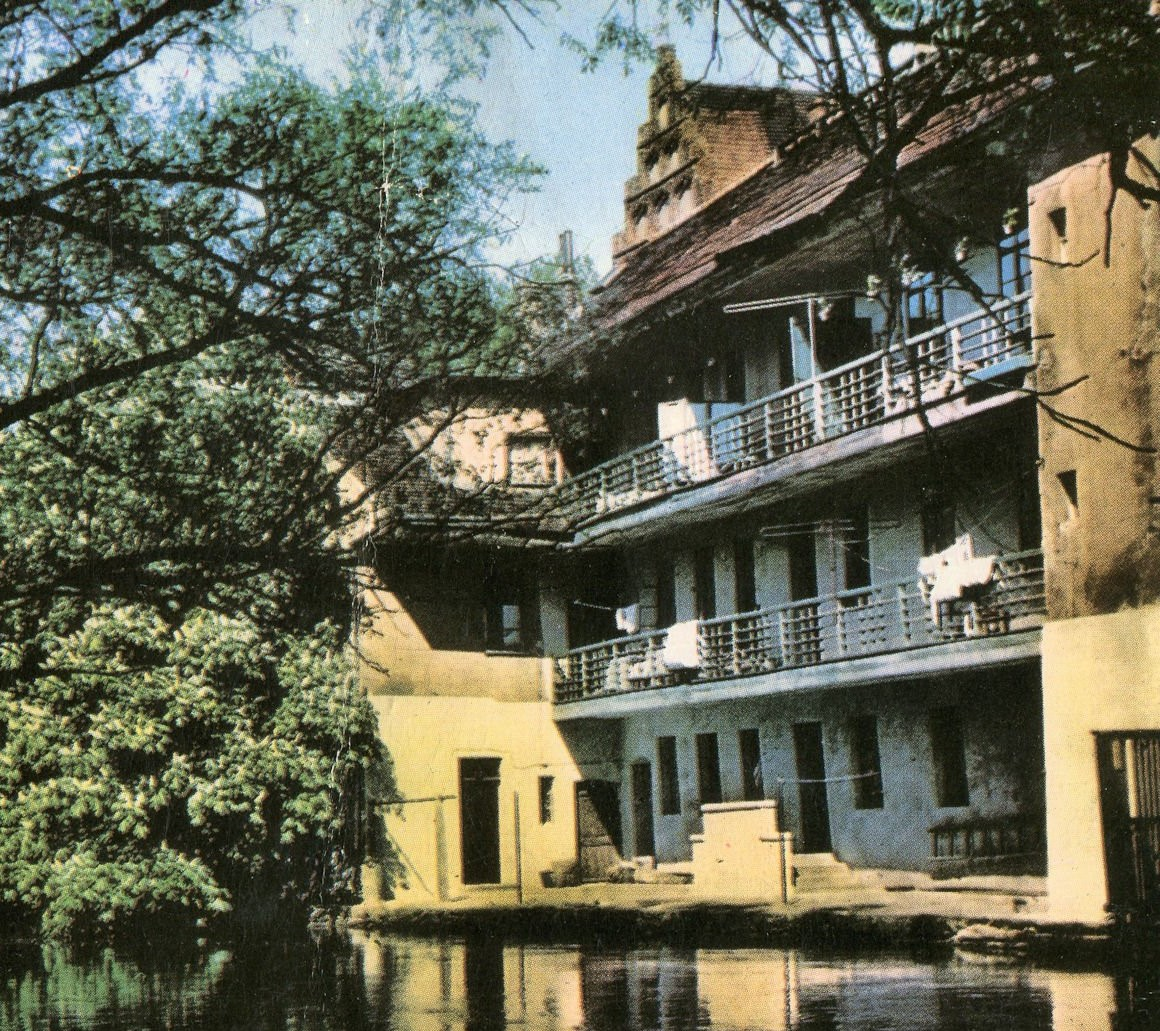
N6 facade on the river, ca 1968

Tenement at 7

Eclecticism

Throughout the Polish partition period (1795–1920), owners were the Wołowski family. Together with Brahegasse 11 (today's Jezuicka 8), it formed one architectural ensemble. The house has been rebuilt in the 1990s, and integrated to tenements 9 to 13 to fit, among others, the city Department of Civil Affairs (Polish: Wydział Spraw Obywatelskich - WSO) and a post office.

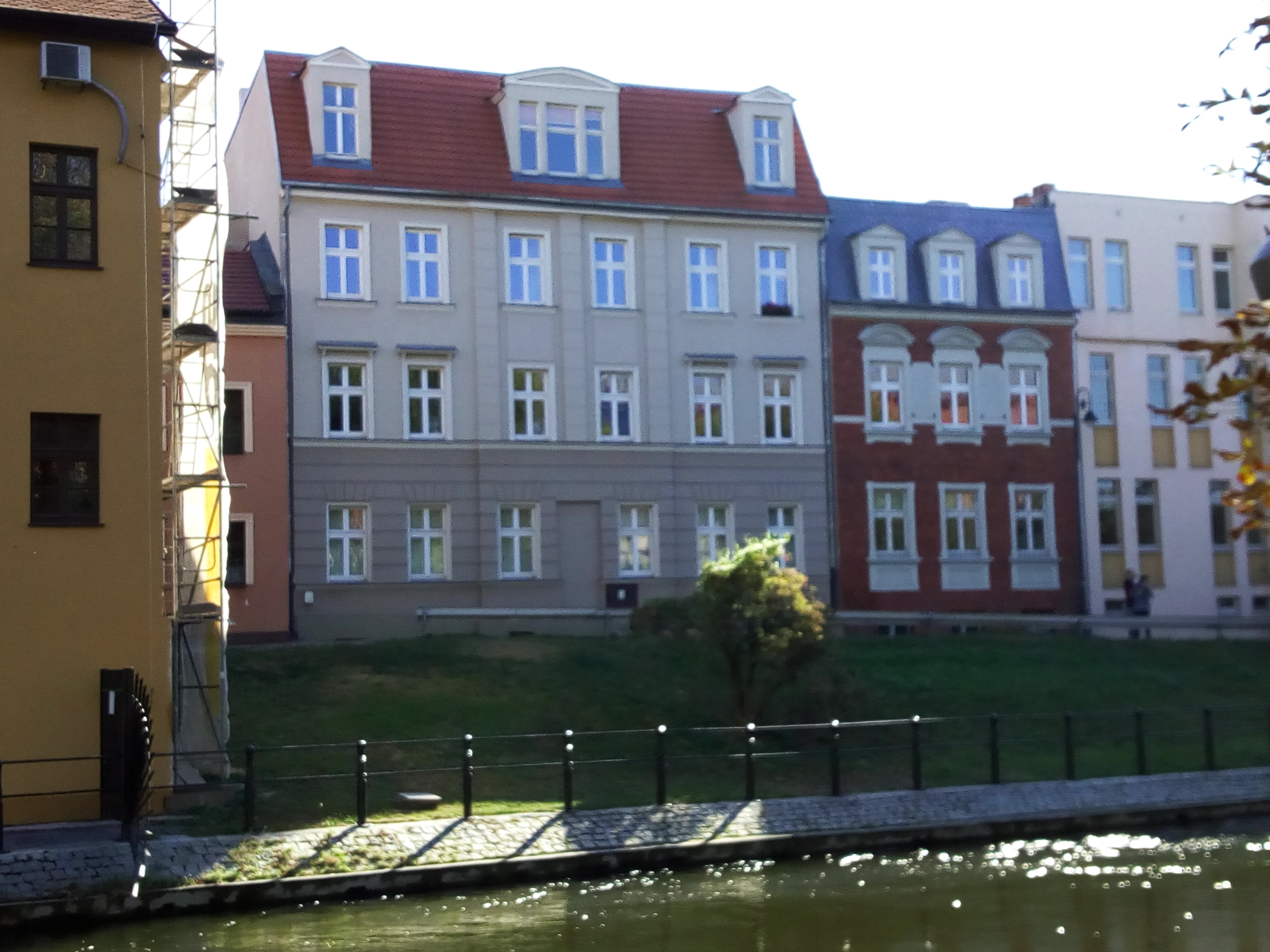
Current view of the renovated frontage (Nr.7 to 13)

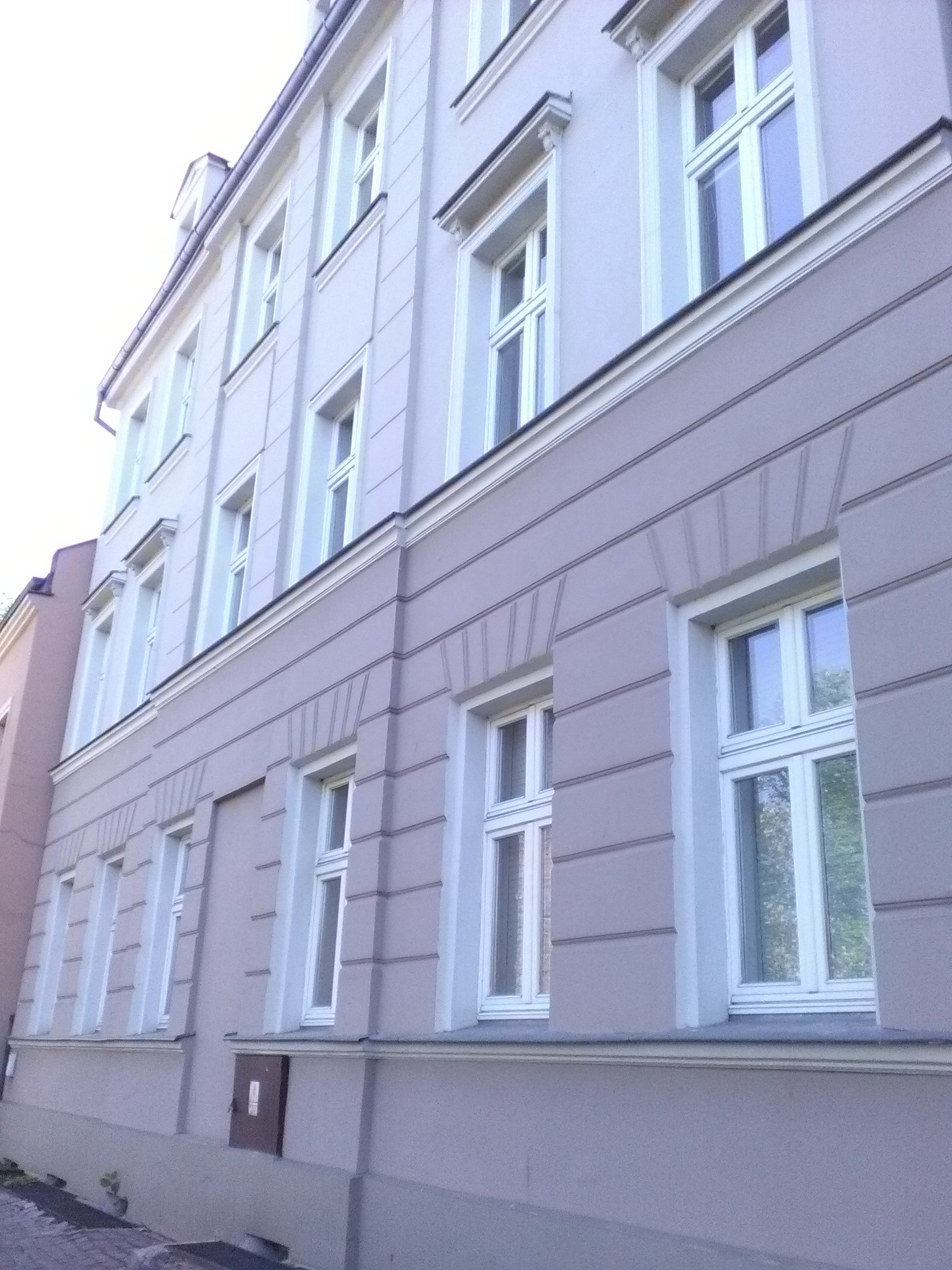
Facade at Nr.7

Tenement at 8 now gone

1890s

In the late 18th century, on the plot was built a small tenement and a granary. Both edifices changed owners regularly: the place was used as a storage and workshop area (vinegar factory, leather shop in the 1860s). In 1869, landlord's son (Miller the young) expanded the building to house bath cabins over the river, supported by wooden stilts. The interior was divided into several separate cabins that could be lowered down to the water by a system of chains. The great success of this business allowed Miller to open a similar bath house at today's Nr.6 a few years later.

Like tenement at Nr.6, Miller's bath house was a long-lasting iconic emblem of Bydgoszcz Venice. The edifice was demolished in 1990. .

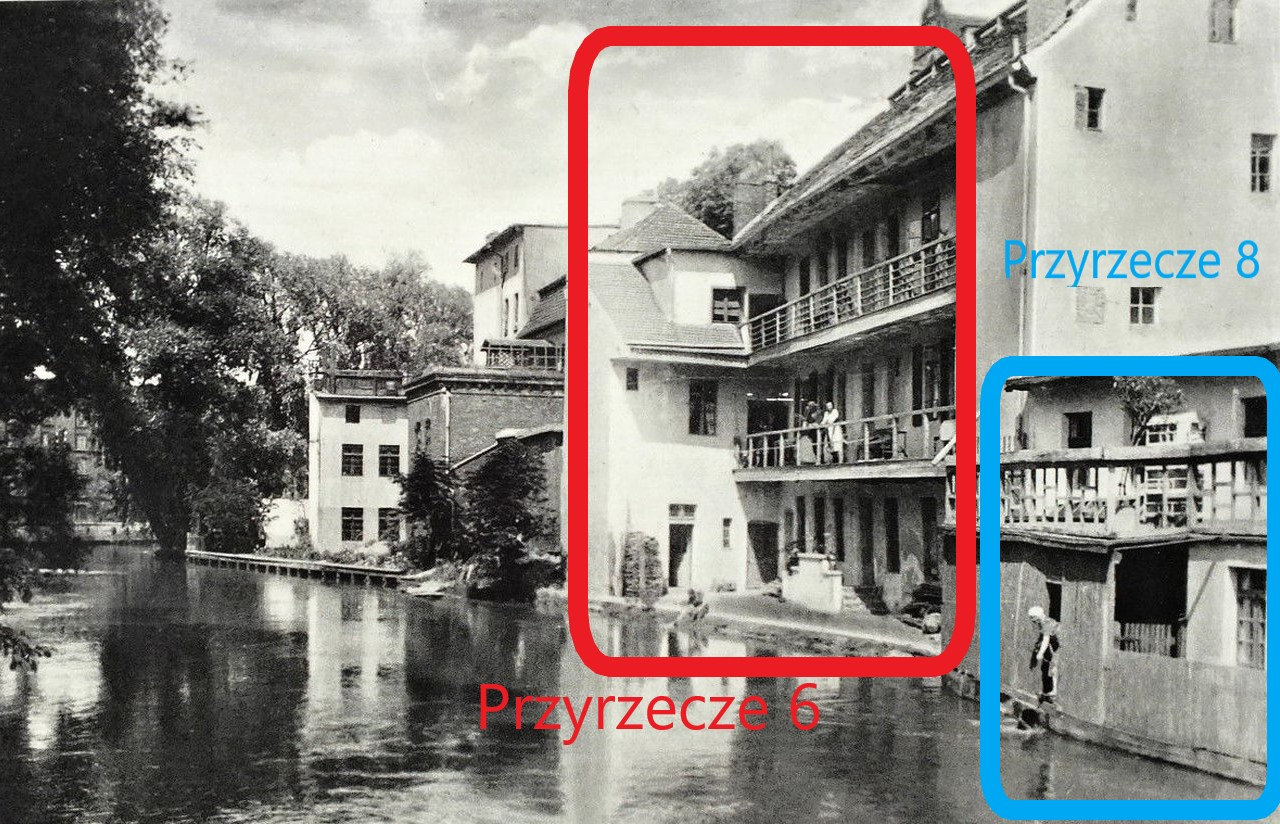
1944 postcard with both gone houses, 6 (left) and 8 (right)

Tenements at 10/14 now gone

1890s

Before 1795, Tomasz Ossowski, owned a brewery on this area, stretching over Brahegasse 2, 3 and 4. The Ossowski was a very wealthy and influential Polish family from Bydgoszcz:

- the family also owned tenements (now gone) at Nr.21, 23 and 26;
- before Tomasz, Sebastian Ossowski founded in 1637 the St. Sebastian chapel in St. Martin and St. Nicholas Cathedral;
- Sebastian's granddaughter, Katarzyna, was the wife of Bydgoszcz mayor, Wojciech Łochowski (The Young).

Tomasz's heir, Regina, sold the 3 houses at 10, 12 and 14 to Prussian citizens : Andrzej Roch and Henry Brinkmann. After a series of owners, a restaurateur, Carl Wagner, bought the ensemble in the second half of the 19th century. The second husband of his widow, Bartłomiej Czerwiński, opened there another restaurant, which has been in business till the end of the second World War. The establishment was very popular in Bydgoszcz.

Building ensemble has been dismantled in the second half of the 20th century, during a re-construction of the Mill Bridge; today, the place is not built and offers a clear area during summer times for food vendors and nearby bar terraces. Poet Wojciech Banach (born 1953 in Bydgoszcz) lived in one of these houses in his youth.

Tenement at 7/13

The house has been rebuilt in 2006, and integrated to tenements 7 to 11 to fit, among others, the city Department of Civil Affairs (Polish: Wydział Spraw Obywatelskich - WSO) and a post office.

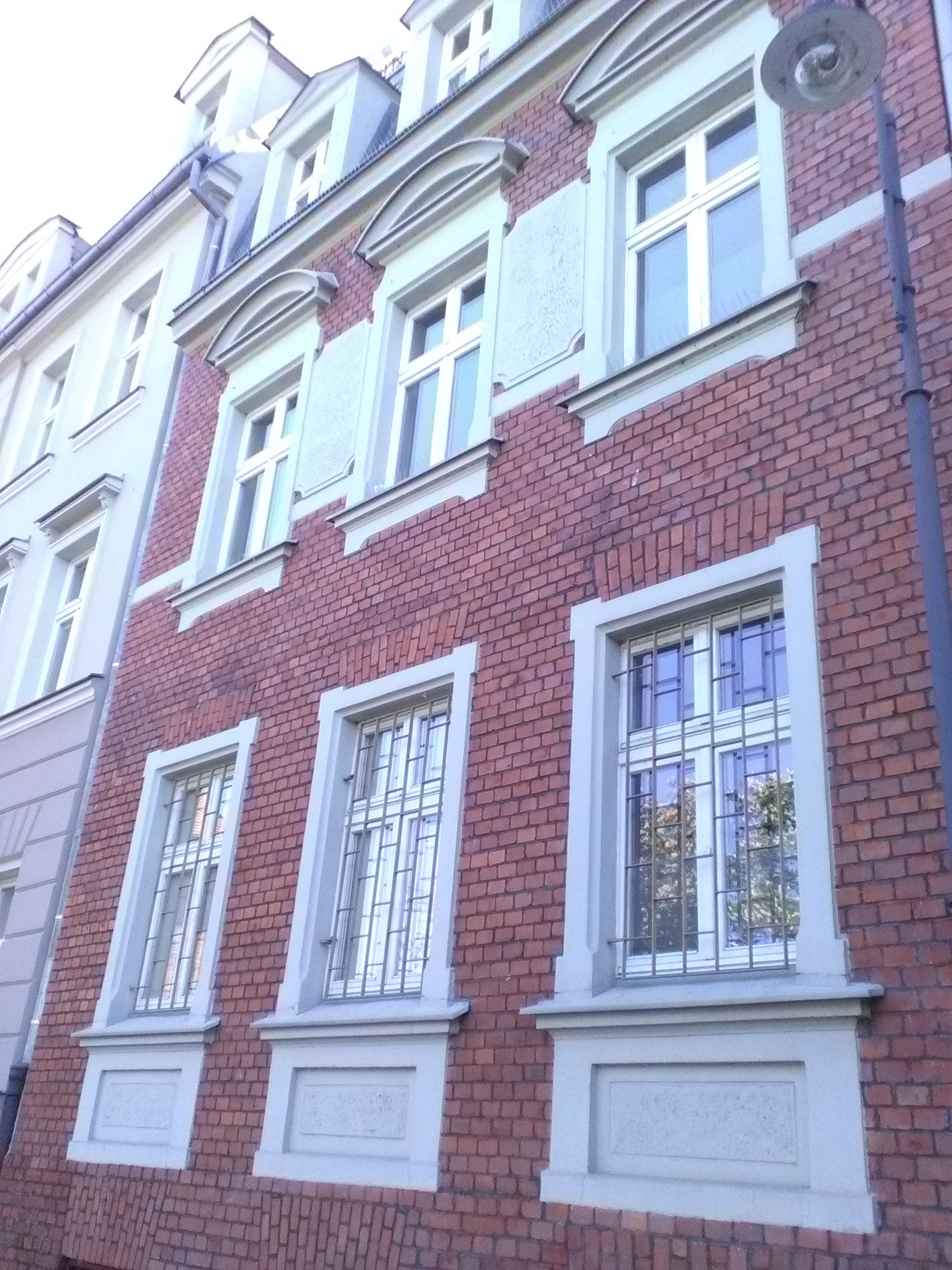
Facade at N9

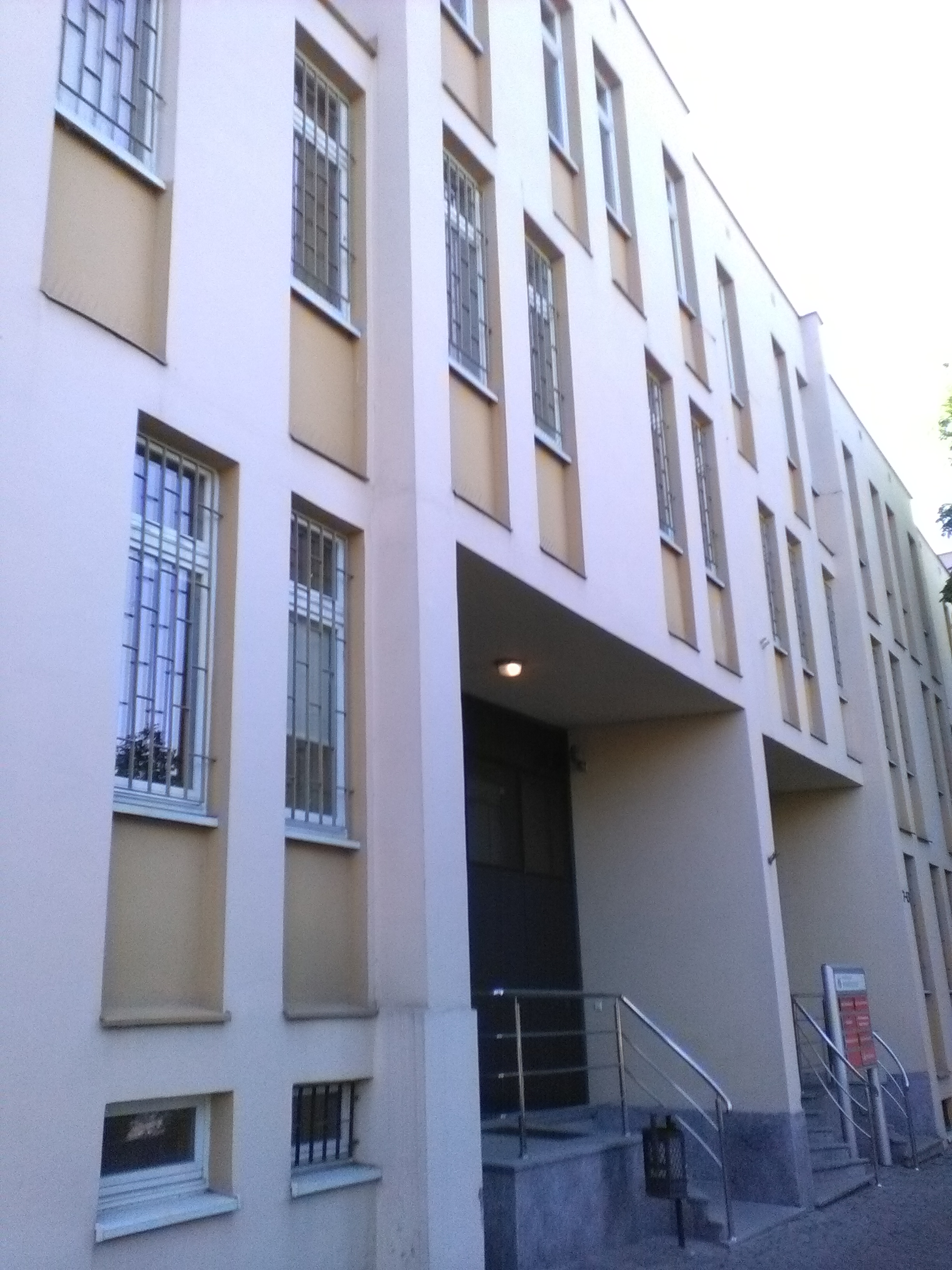
Facade of the post office at N11/13

Tenement at 15

1990s-2000s

Modern Architecture

First buildings, referenced at Nr.21 and 23 (then Brahegasse 21 & 22), were property of the Ossowski family, till 1835. The ensemble has been razed at the end of the 20th century, a large habitation house complex stands now on this spot.

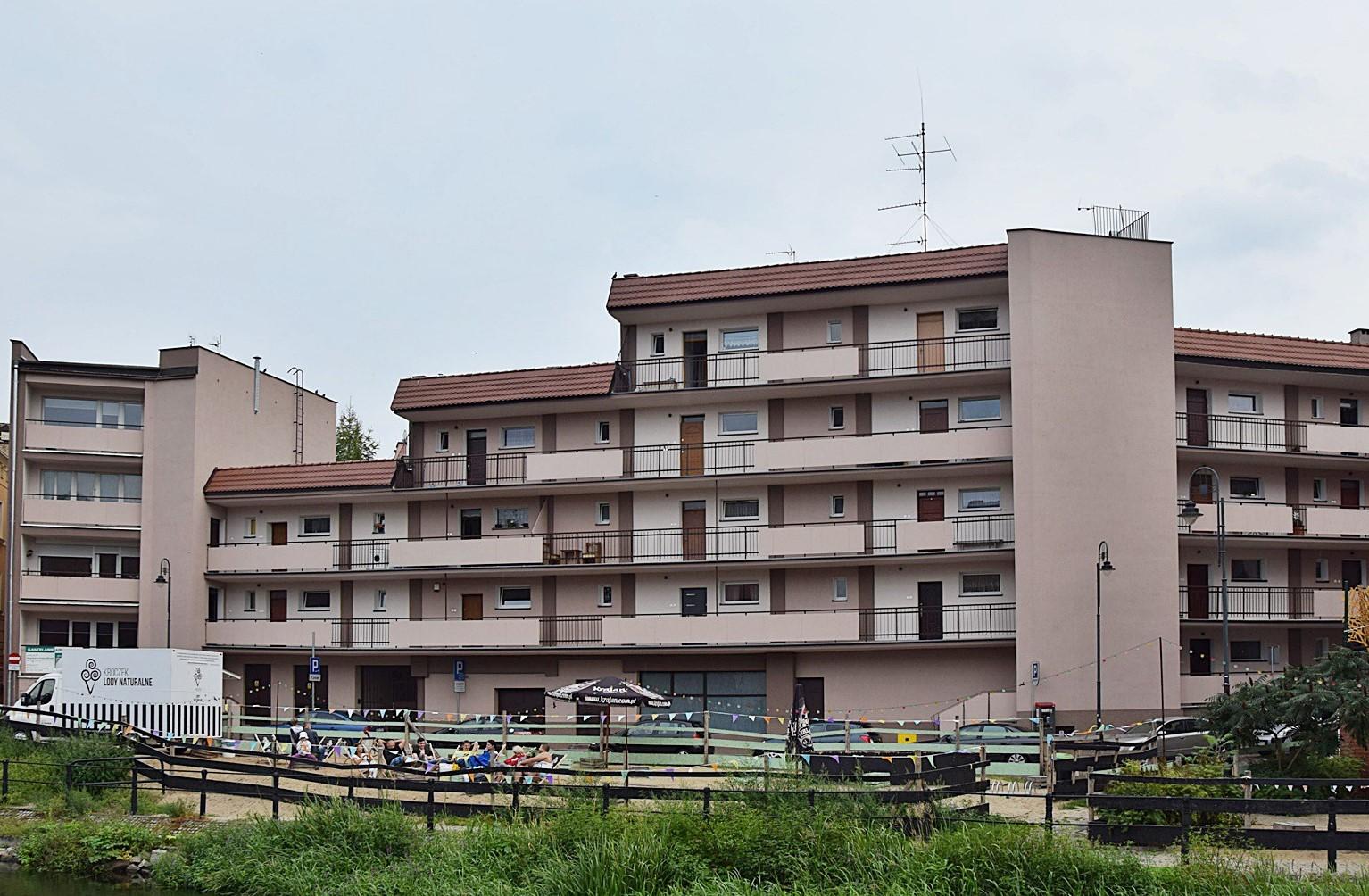
View from Mill Island

House at Długa street 11, corner with Przyrzecze Street

19th century

Neoclassical architecture

The house was inhabited during almost a century by the Lebenheim family (Amalie, Jacob, Wilhem) who worked in the leather business, when the address was "Friedrich Straße 43". This tenement ends the southern branch of Przyrzecze Street.

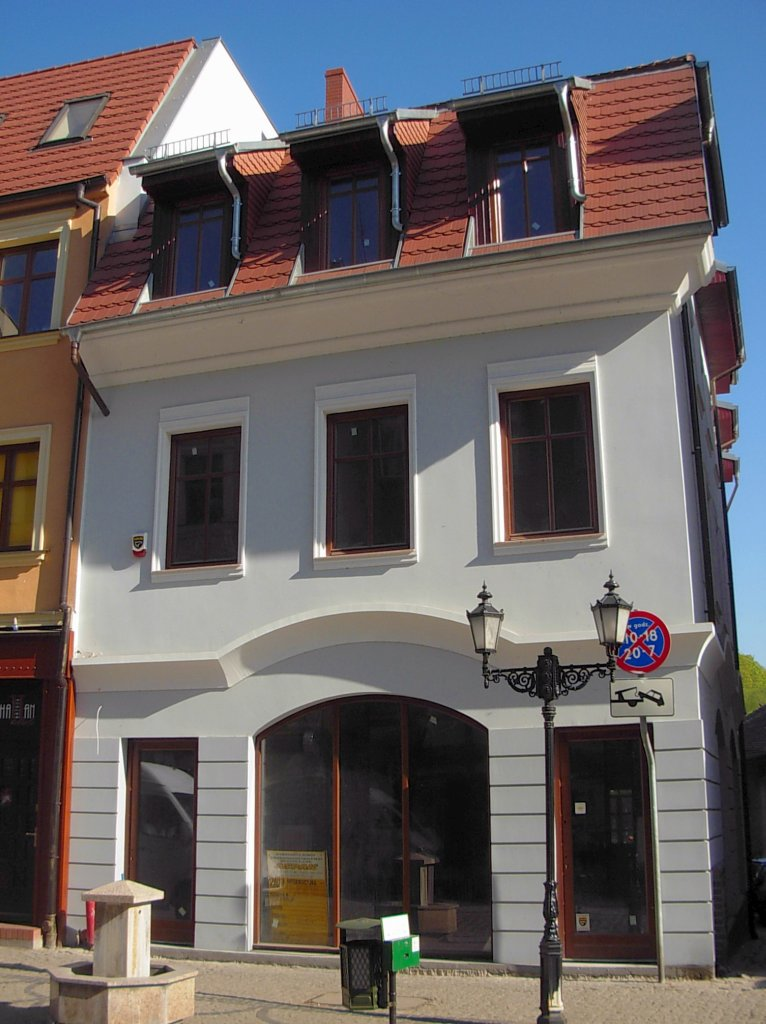
View from Długa street

== See also ==
- Bydgoszcz
- Bydgoszcz Architects (1850-1970s)

== Bibliography ==
- Derenda, Jerzy (2006). Piękna stara Bydgoszcz. Tom I z serii: Bydgoszcz miasto na Kujawach (in Polish). Bydgoszcz: Towarzystwo Miłośników Miasta Bydgoszczy. ISBN 9788391617809.
- Gordon, Wincenty (1970). Bydgoskie Stare Miasto. Ulica Przyrzecze. Kalendarz Bydgoski (in Polish). Bydgoszcz: Towarzystwo Miłośników Miasta Bydgoszczy. p. 67.
- Umiński, Janusz (1996). Bydgoszcz i okolice: Przewodnik (in Polish). Bydgoszcz: Regionalny Oddział PTTK „Szlak Brdy”. ISBN 9788321725239.
