= Ludwig Buchholz's Tannery, Bydgoszcz =

Coordinates: 53°07′37″N 17°59′42″E

Ludwig Buchholz's tannery in Bydgoszcz
- Polish: Garbarnia Buchholza
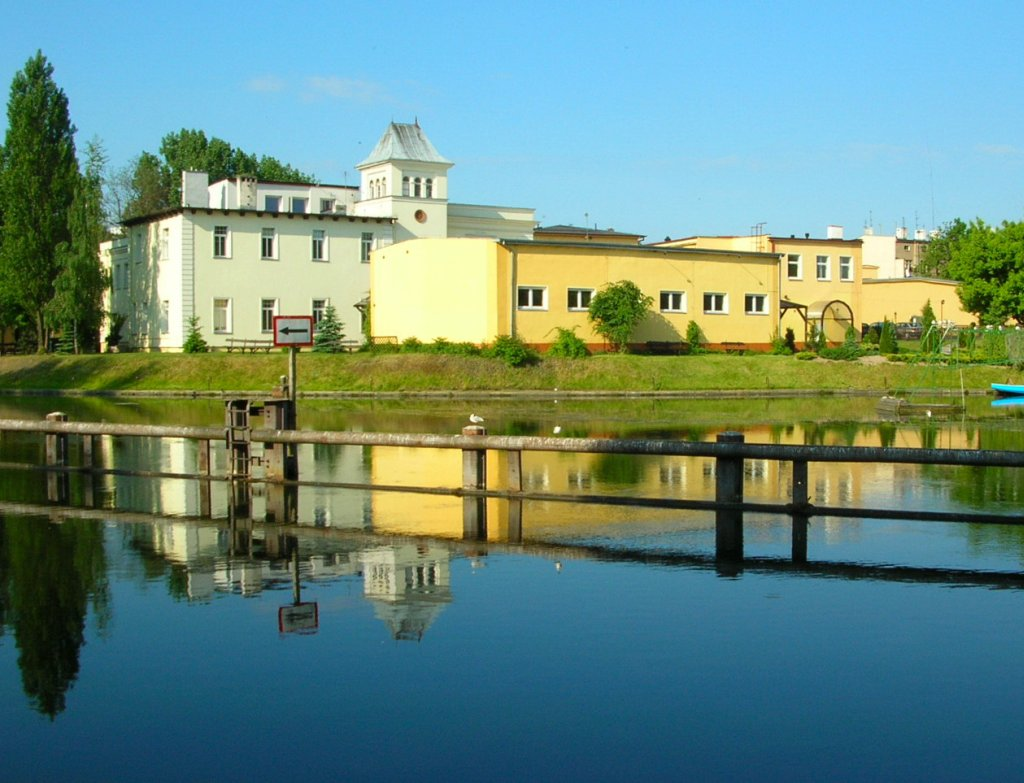
- View of the complex from the Brda river

General information
- Type: Tannery
- Architectural style: Eclecticism, Neo-Baroque
- Classification: Nr.601293, Reg. A/1066 (April 4, 1995)
- Location: Poland
- Address: 2 Garbary Street
- Town or city: Bydgoszcz
- Elevation: 38m
- Completed: 1862
- Renovated: 1899, 1914
- Closed: 1992
- Owner: Private University of Economy

Design and construction
- Architect(s): Heinrich Mautz, Carl Rose

Website
- eurostudies.pl/home.1.html

Ludwig Buchholz's Tannery was a leather complex factory which operated from 1845 to 1992 in Bydgoszcz, Kuyavia, Poland. The plot and the administrative building are now used by the Private University of Economy of Bydgoszcz (Polish: Wyższa Szkoła Gospodarki w Bydgoszczy).

== Location ==
Ludwig Buchholz's tannery was standing in a Brda river bend, on the west bank, at the junction of Garbary and Grottger streets. Out of the factory complex, only the villa of Ludwig Buchholz is still preserved today.

== History ==
=== Ludwig Buchholz ===
Ludwig Casimir Buchholz was born on March 4, 1822, in Koronowo, from Carl Buchholz and his second wife, Ewa. He quickly learned the craft of tanning, and traveled through the whole Kingdom of Prussia and several other countries to improve on his trade skills as a youngster. He founded in Bromberg a small tannery on February 23, 1845, at Jezuicka Street where he employed two people. Main production was focused on working cattle skins originating from Germany, with a yearly production not exceeding 100 units. After receiving tanning master graduation in 1855, he took part twice to the city industrial exhibitions (1855 and 1868).

With the increase of production, the workshop had to be relocated to Przyrzecze street, along a leat channel of the Brda river. In 1861, Ludwig Buchholz bought several parcels along the river, in the vicinity of Schleusen and Albert straßen (today's Garbary and Grottgera streets), designed for the construction of a larger leather factory. First buildings in this area were completed in 1862, in particular Ludwig's s villa, and at the end of the 19th century the tannery was operational. It was a large, fully mechanized company employing 170 people and processing 140000 skins per year.

Ludwig Buchholz set up a residential building for workers, and in 1895 he celebrated company's 50th anniversary by refunding an important cash sum to all his employees. At that time, he also donated 10000 German gold mark to the city of Bromberg, with specific guidances to use part of it for the relief of the poorest during Christmas period.

The economic success of the tannery launched Ludwig Buchholz's social and political career: he had been a member of the City Council since 1858, and a member of the city magistrate from 1874 to 1891. He was specifically active at the Income Tax Board and the Directorate for the Poor, but also a member of the board of several charity and charitable organizations. By and large, he was considered as a prominent industrialist and a wise socialite. He also acted as a member of the local assemblies, Poznan and Bydgoszcz counties. He was honored with the dignity of commercial counselor (1872) and decorated the Order of the Red Eagle- Knight 4th class (1895). Ludwig Buchholz died on May 25, 1900, in Bydgoszcz.

=== The Tannery ===
The tannery was founded in 1845, by 23-year-old Ludwig Buchholz. The design of the factory complex was prepared by carpenter Heinrich Mautz. In 1862 a residential house and a few factory buildings were built, and by 1876 there 13 were standing on the plot. The factory was located at streets Garbary 2-8 and Grottgera 7-10.

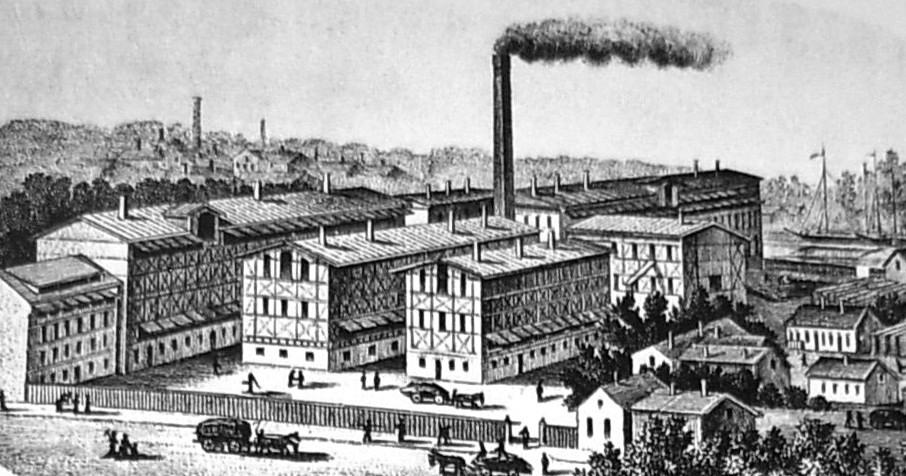
Ludwig Buchholz's tannery ca 1875-1900, drawing by Berthold Jaeckel

The factory had a thriving activity, requiring the construction of a new factory and a sawmill on a convenient location near the bridge over the Brda River. At the end of the 19th century, a general modernization of the machinery took place: most of the equipment was then steam driven with engines built by Theodor and Adolf Wulff company in Bydgoszcz, located at Bahnhoffstraße 29.

At the eve of the 20th century, Buchholz's tannery was one of the largest leather factories in eastern Prussia. Production was sold mainly in the German Empire, especially the eastern provinces and Berlin. The company opened its own branch in Königsberg, managed by Ludwig's son. After Ludwig's death in 1900, the firm was managed by his son Herman.

The tannery continued to operate through the 20th century with German funds, and its products were awarded several times at international fairs (Rome in 1926, Paris in 1927). After the Great Depression in Poland, the factory was running at 50% of its capacity in the late 1930s, employing about 250 employees. Its activity continued during the German Occupation of Poland (1939–1945).

After World War II, the factory was nationalized and merged into the Kobra with other local factories producing shoes. In 1956, the main local branch of Kobra was located in Bydgoszcz, at Chocimska street. In the 1970s the facility produced daily 13 000 pair of shoes (mainly men's), including 1600 pairs for uniformed services (Polish State Railways, fire brigade, national police and paramilitary police). Kobra used to export to Great Britain, Germany and the USSR. The factory declined at the end of the 1980s, and eventually went bankrupt in 1992.

=== University of Economy of Bydgoszcz ===
In 1999, the entire plot was purchased by the University of Economy in Bydgoszcz (private), then named which Higher Pomeranian School of Tourism and Hotel Industry. The institution has been founded in 1989 by the firm Kolfer, owned at the time by Krzysztof Sikora and Małgorzata Szymańska-Sikora. Its activity was initially related to tourism and Information technology.

The establishment of the university was preceded by the Kolfer College School, created in 1994.

The Higher Pomeranian School of Tourism (Polish: Wyższa Pomorska Szkoła Turystyki i Hotelarstwa) has been established officially in Bydgoszcz, on April 26, 1999, and was listed in the register of non-state higher education institutions on June 10, 1999, (Nr.145).

New curriculums were introduced in 2004: sociology, architecture and urban planning, geography, transport and logistics. This change in the nature of the university was sanctioned by a change in its name on October 1, 2004, as University of Economics. The structure of the university then relied on three departments: technical, socio-economic, tourism and hotel divisions.

In 2006, local branches have been established in Ełk, Malbork and Inowroclaw. Others have been opened in Slupsk (2010) and Toruń (2011).

== Architecture ==
The only building from the Buchholz's facility that survived is Ludwig's house.

The edifice displays Eclecticism style with predominant forms of Baroque Revival architecture. It is a typical instance of industrial architecture, as it has been developed in factory complexes in the second half of the 19th century. Such ensembles from the same period are also found in Bydgoszcz (Villa Carl Blumwe), Łódź and Warsaw. The villa served as a home for owners and as business offices.

Its present appearance owes much to a subsequent redesign in 1899, by architect Carl Rose, who also built a rear building in 1914. Carl Rose was a prolific Prussian designer in Bydgoszcz, with realizations in Gdańska Street (51,135), Konarskiego or Warmińskiego streets. He created a small inner courtyard for the villa, glazed in the 1940s and turned into a palm house by architect Carl Schaum from Hamburg.

Inside, one can appreciate the original fireplace on the ground floor, probably designed during the rebuilding of 1899, adorned with Neo-baroque motifs.

Since 1999, Ludwig's villa is the administrative seat of the private University of Economy of Bydgoszcz.

== Gallery ==
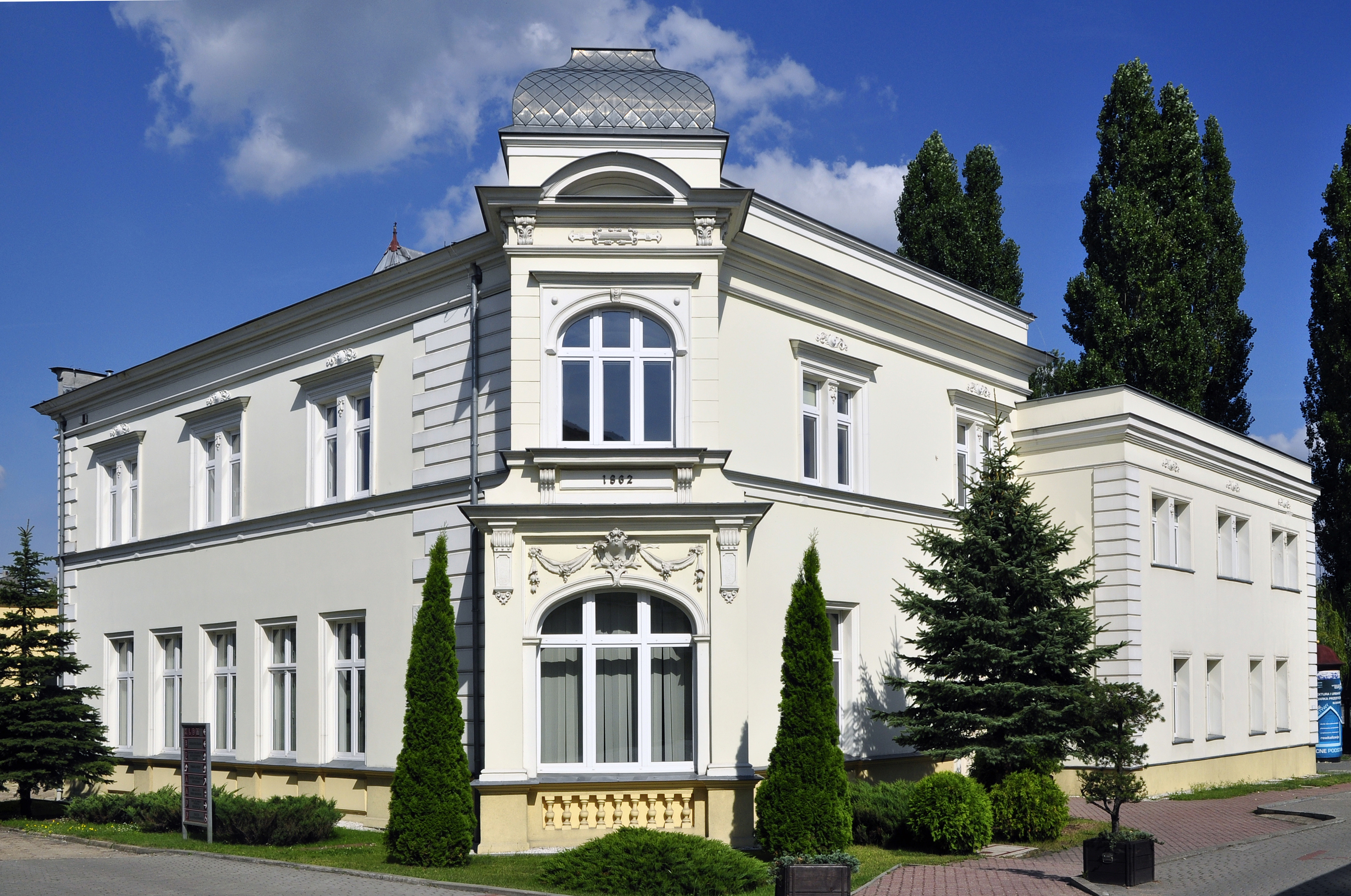
Ludwig's House on the University of Economy campus

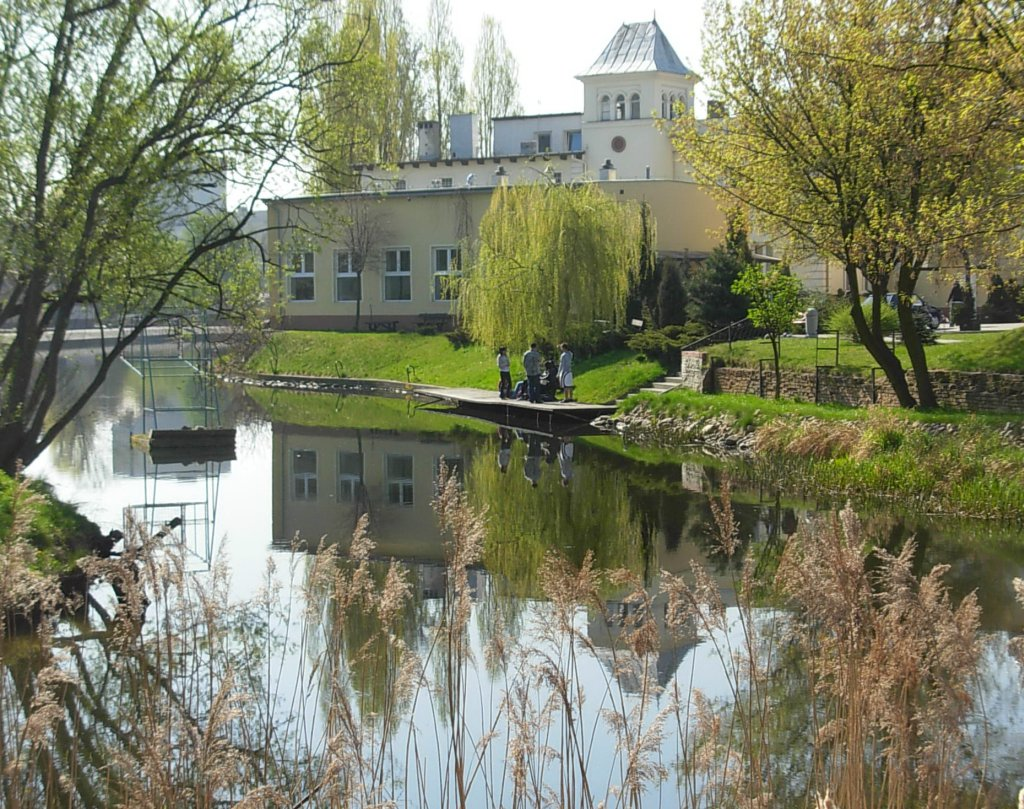
View from Brda river opposite bank

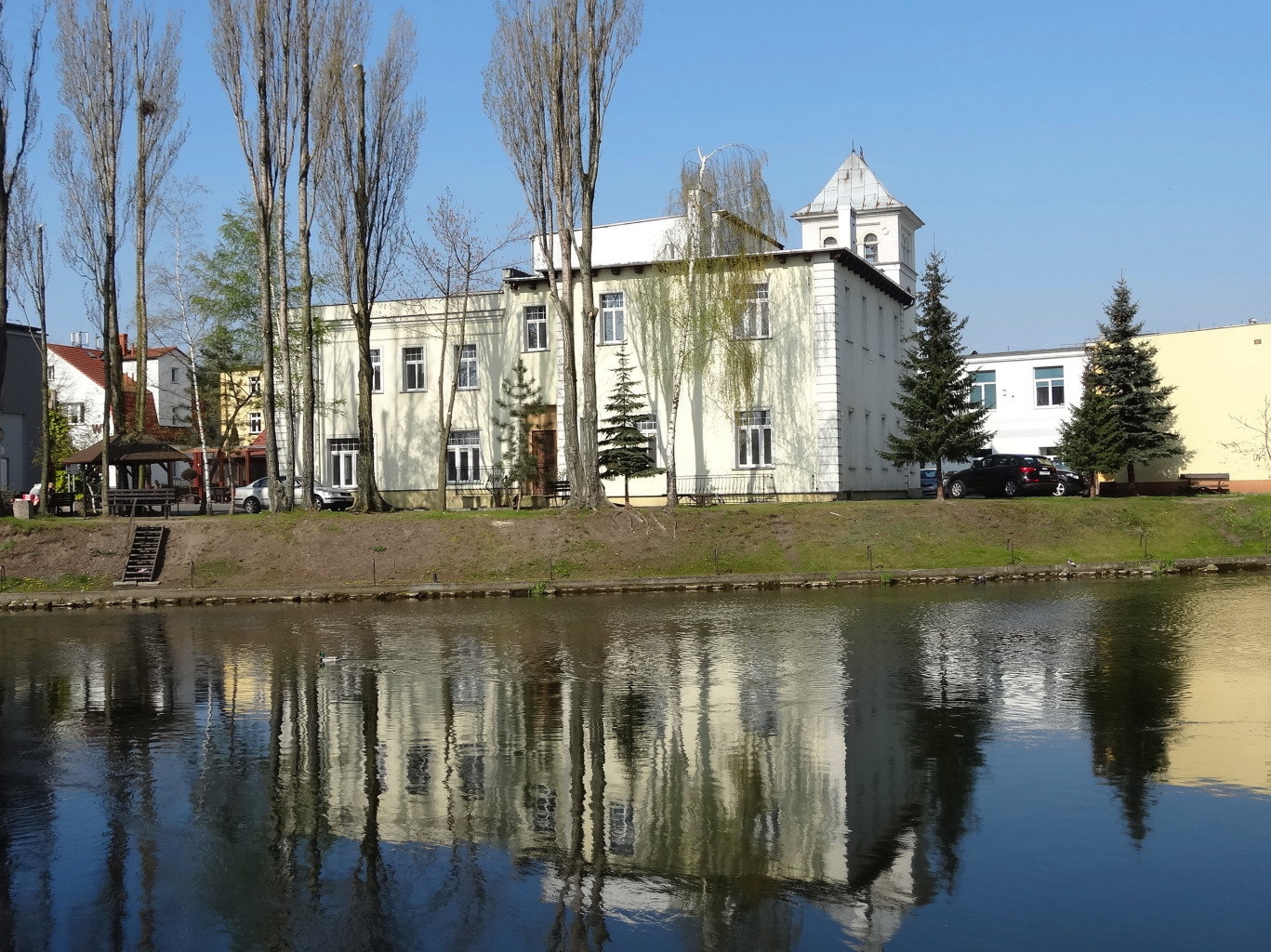
Ludwig's House

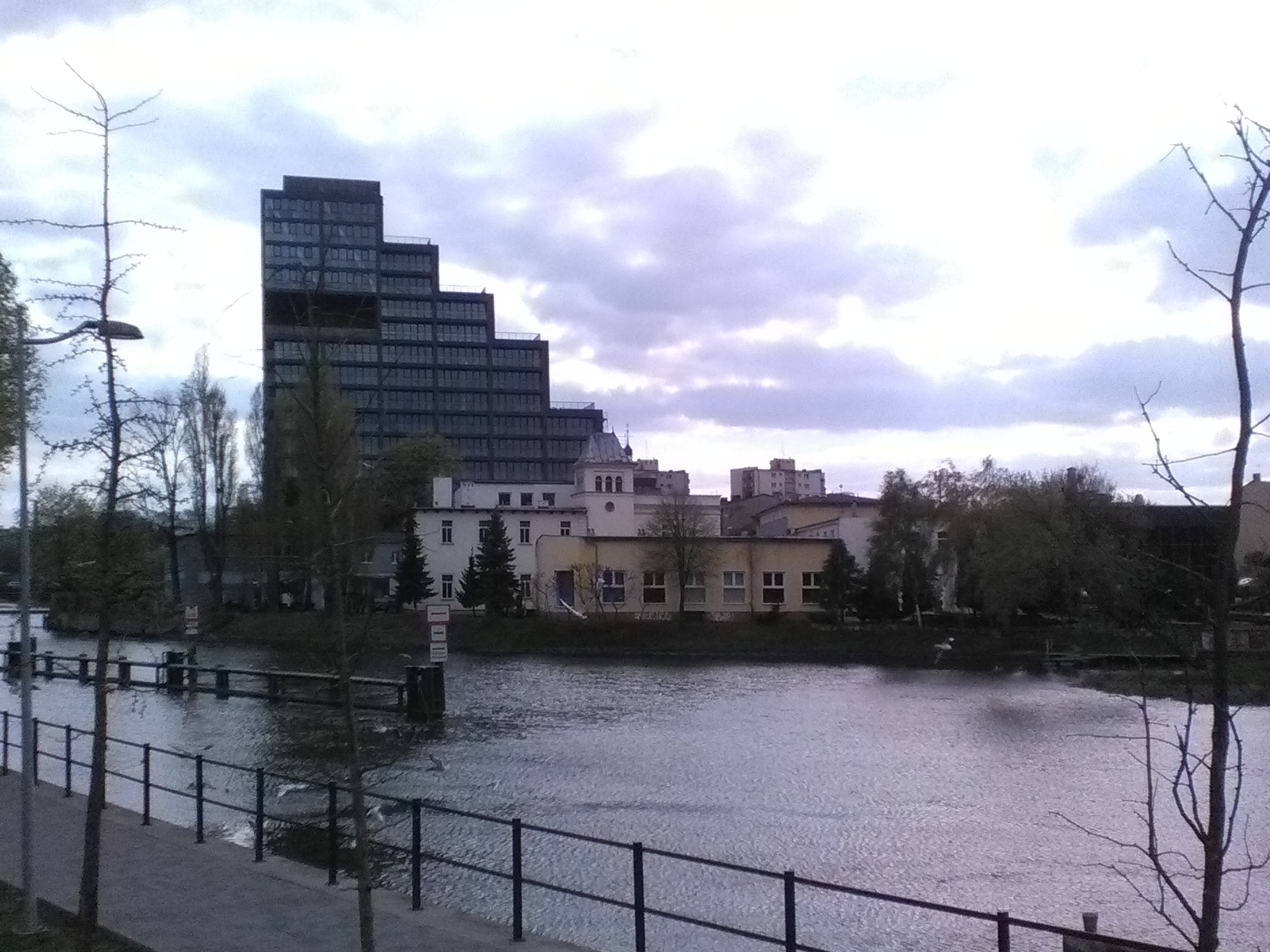
Nordic Haven building in the backdrop

== See also ==
- Garbary Street
- Blumwes' buildings in Bydgoszcz
- Gasworks building, Bydgoszcz
- Mill Island in Bydgoszcz

== Bibliography ==
- (in Polish) Wysocka, Agnieszka (2004). Bydgoszcz w stronę Okola. Urząd Miasta Bydgoszczy – Rada Osiedla Okole. ISBN 8392172507.
- (in Polish) Błażejewski Stanisław, Janusz Kutta, Marek Romaniuk (1997). Bydgoski Słownik Biograficzny. T. IV. Bydgoszcz: Kujawsko-Pomorskie Towarzystwo Kulturalne Wojewódzki Ośrodek Kultury. pp. 27–28. ISBN 8385327428.
- (in German) Gewerberat Böhm: Industrie und bemerbe in Bromberg. Bromberg: A. Dittmann. 1907. pp. 182–183.
