= Uniformed services =

Individuals operating to protect the public

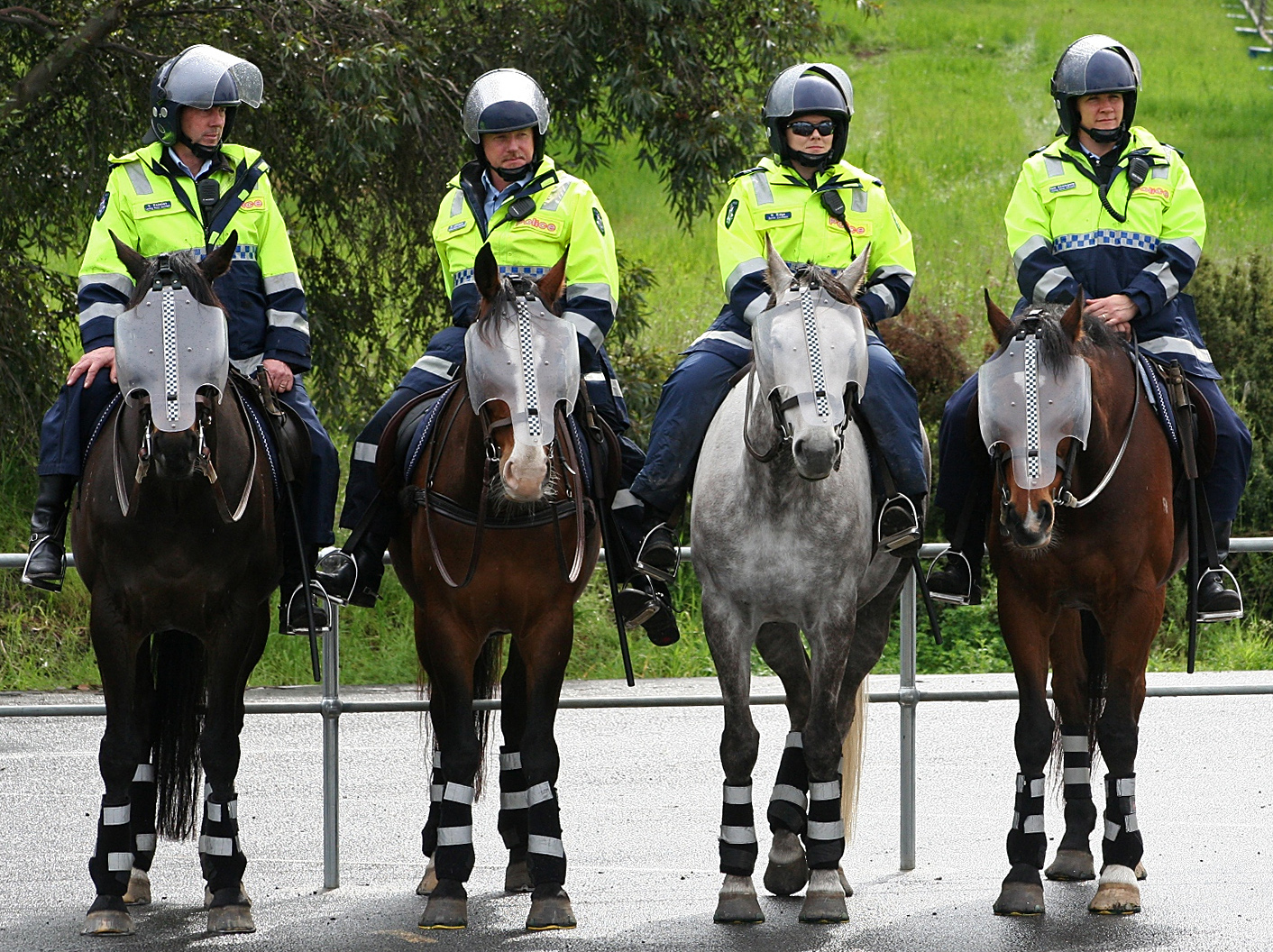
Australian Mounted Police Force

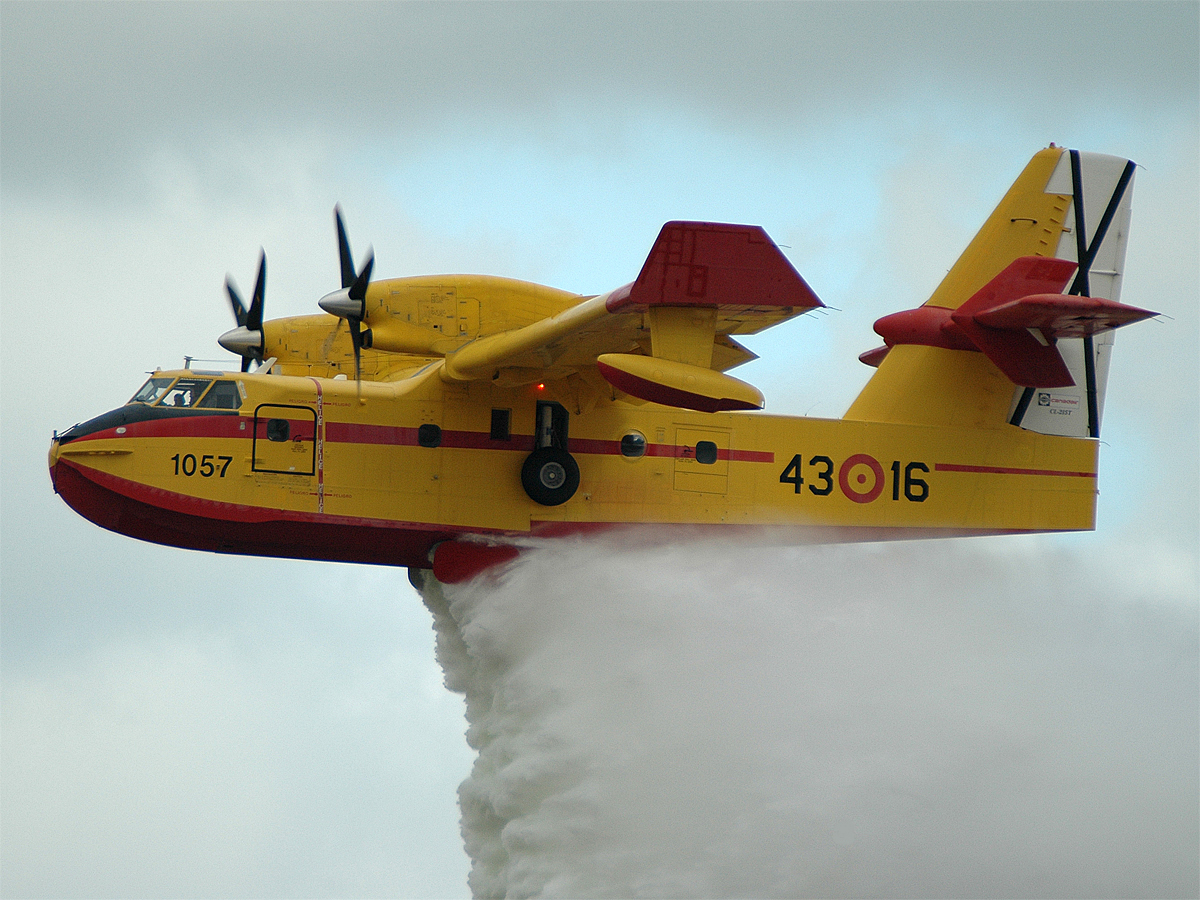
Canadair CL-215 extinguishing fire, with a bright yellow livery.

A uniformed service is a person working in similar uniform worn within a group to operate a specific duty. This often includes the armed service and public officials. In practice, this means applying identifying colours, patterns, or symbols to clothing or equipment, such as camouflage, or a logo. Some forms of a uniformed service is an organized force, legal official, or a health official, that ensures public protection.

Commonly, a law enforcement or an emergency service will use identifying patterns, and sounds, often with the means to inform the public to and to facilitate a faster response, if necessary. Often when signaling, both sounds, and lights, it is possible for the ongoing public traffic to stop, or slow down. This increases the safety of traffic and the emergency response for the transport of an individual, from a possibly ongoing emergency.

Military camouflage is used to hide during a military operation which often serves the purpose to deceive any perceived threat. Though it is possible for the camouflage to be an identifying color if used in the wrong conditions.

== Principles ==
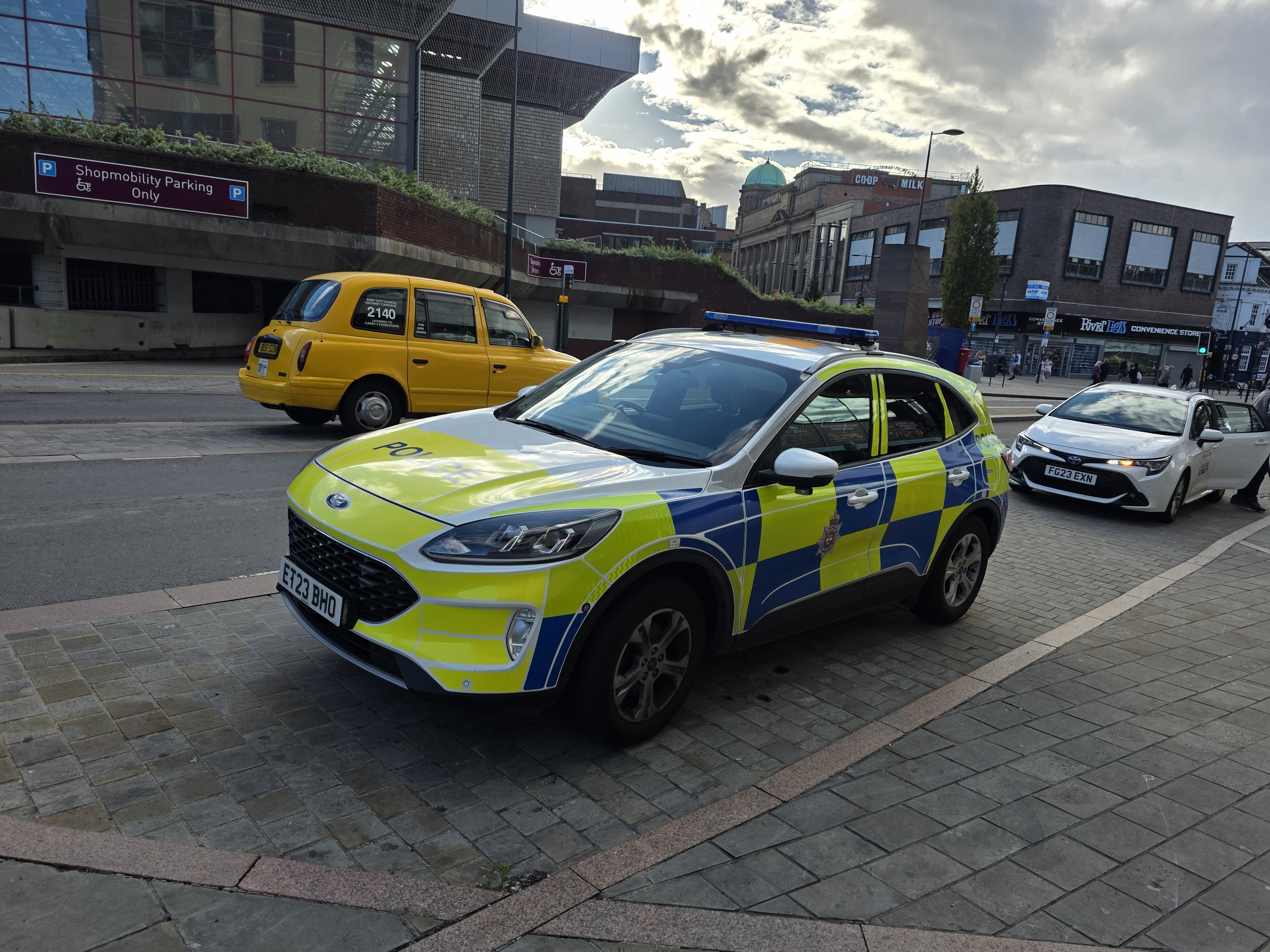
Distinctive patterns of a law enforcement agency using the art rule of symbolism to ensure authority.

A uniformed service operates under several different principles and characteristics. This includes identifying patterns both on vehicles and clothing.

=== Checkered patterns ===
In some environments, distinctive patterns are used to highlight their presence in the public and often promote authority by means of operating it correctly with legitimate roles. Related checkered patterns, used by other services include individuals participating in speed competitions, which is commonly associated with black and white.

=== Black and White ===
In other practices law enforcement use the tactic of deception to the public with a stereotypical uniform. This is done to ensure the following of legal rules, and to ensure safety. For speed competitions it plays a common role often for a starter to signify the start of a race, and for roles including providing weather conditions. The flag is used by a uniformed service, commonly known as the Motorsport Marshals, who control the flag and coordinate direct communication to drivers.

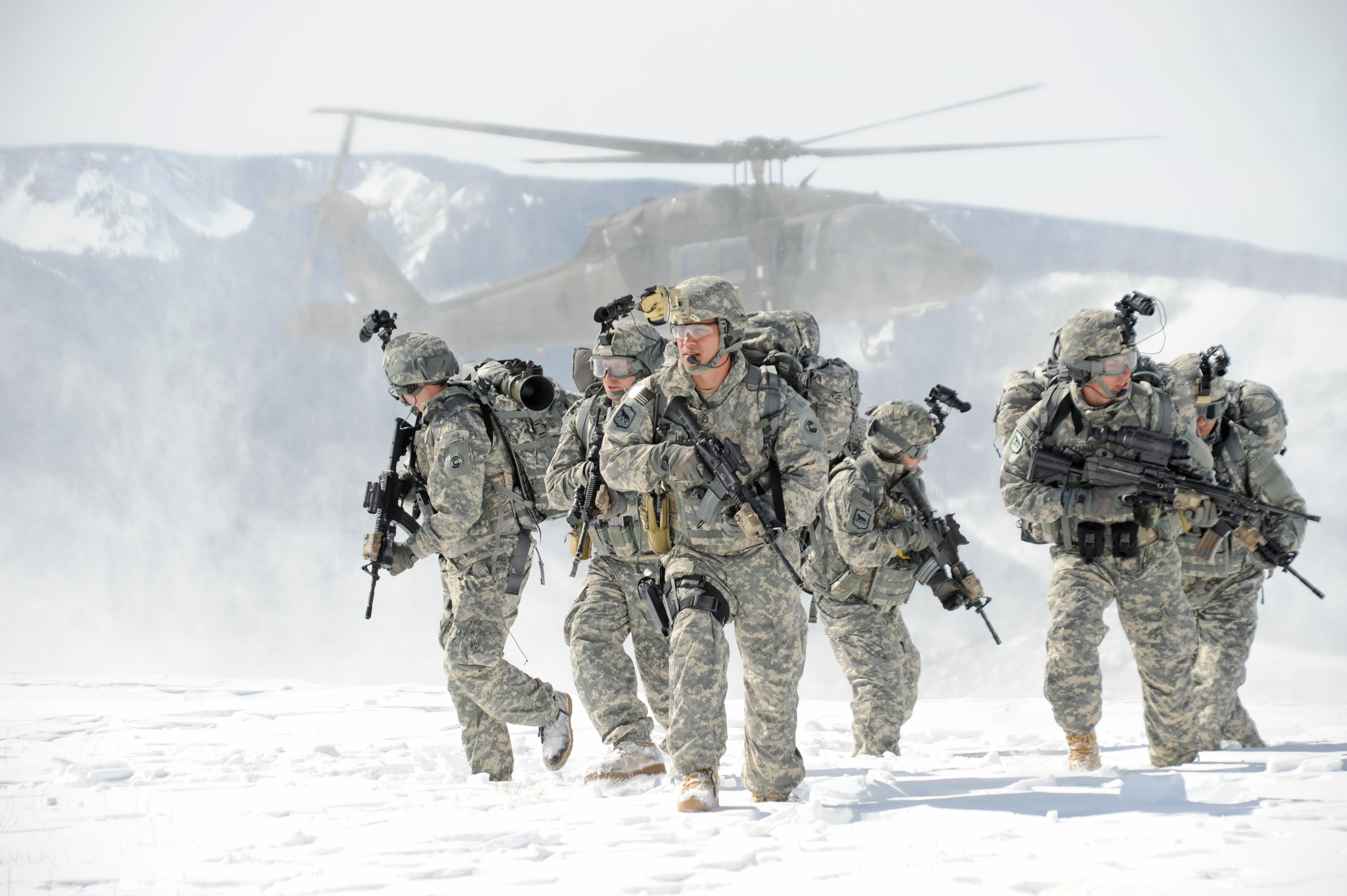
Tactical cold weather clothing

=== Clothing ===
Identifying colors are used to by in most practices all uniformed service. This creates a large variety of different patterns and characteristics. Clothing may be used topically for camouflage or military performing roles in the armed forces.

=== Protective equipment ===
If needed for the use of; chemicals, fire, wartime, safety or for medical cases. It can be used for protection, or for experiments.

== See also ==
- Uniformed services of the United States
- Hong Kong Disciplined Services
