= Bydgoszcz Cathedral =

Catholic Church, Bydgoszcz, Poland, 14th century

Coordinates: 53.1228°N 17.9989°E

St. Martin and St. Nicholas Cathedral
- Katedra św. Marcina i Mikołaja
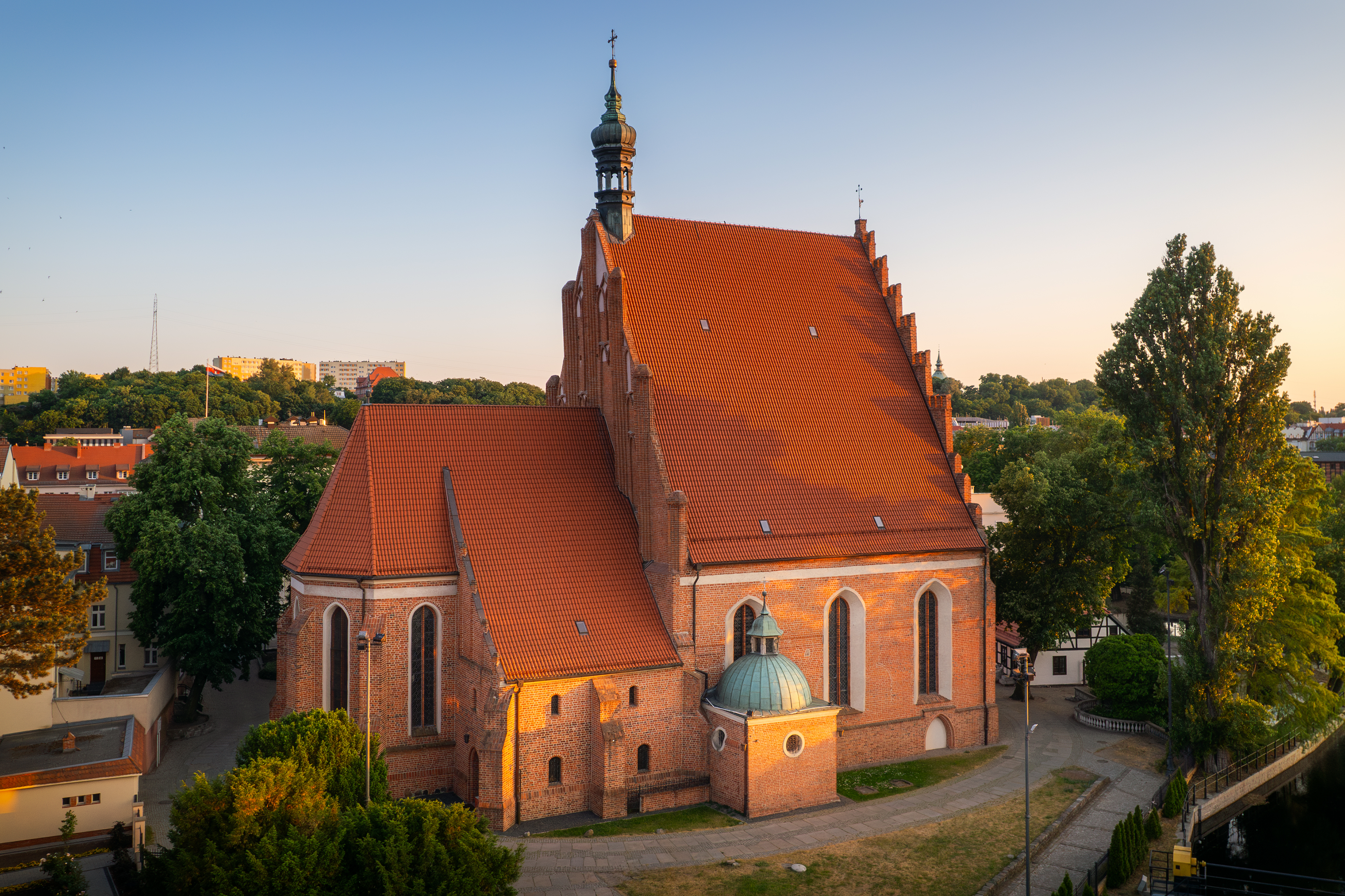
- St. Martin and St. Nicholas Cathedral
- Location: Bydgoszcz
- Country: Poland
- Denomination: Roman Catholic Church
- Website: www.katedrabydgoska.pl

History
- Dedication: The Most Holy Virgin Mary, Queen of Poland, Martin of Tours, Saint Nicholas
- Consecrated: March 25, 2004

Architecture
- Heritage designation: Nr.601220-Reg. A/740 (November 3, 1960)
- Style: Brick Gothic
- Groundbreaking: 1346–1364
- Completed: 1425

Specifications
- Capacity: 1800 seats
- Length: 52 metres (171 ft)
- Width: 40 metres (130 ft)
- Materials: Brick

Administration
- Diocese: Roman Catholic Diocese of Bydgoszcz

St. Martin and St. Nicholas Cathedral (Polish: Katedra św. Marcina i Mikołaja), or simply known as Bydgoszcz Cathedral, is a Catholic church built in the 15th century. It has a Gothic style, serves as a parish church and cathedral of the Diocese of Bydgoszcz. It also houses a shrine dedicated to the Virgin Mary. Its address is 10 Farna Street.

It is the most valuable architectural monument of the Old Town, standing on the Brda riverside. It was elevated to cathedral on March 25, 2004, by decision of then Pope John Paul II. Since November 3, 1960, the cathedral has been registered on the Kuyavian-Pomeranian heritage list.

== History ==
=== Construction of the first temple ===
The Bydgoszcz parish church was founded by first mayors of the city, Jan Kiesselhuth and Konrad, at the same time the parish itself was created, after Bydgoszcz's establishment in 1346. The church building and its adjoining cemetery (active until 1809) were located in the north-western corner of city marketplace (today's Old Market Place – Polish: Stary Rynek), reaching the banks of the river Brda and its millrace branches feeding water mills (today's Mill Island).

The 17th-century chronicle of Bydgoszcz by Wojciech Łochowski as well as historical researches suggest that prior the construction of the parish church, an older temple dedicated to Saint Giles had already been standing in the suburbs of the old city of Kujawski. From the 13th century, it served as a chapel of ease for local officials and knights of Bydgoszcz castle. After the construction of the castle in Bydgoszcz in the middle of the 14th century, Saint Giles's church replaced the castle chapel. Until building completion of the parish church, its priest resided at the chapel of ease. This episode established a later but distorted tradition, making Saint Giles's church the oldest parish church in Bydgoszcz; the chapel was demolished in 1879 when constructing Bernardyńska Street.

It is believed that Bydgoszcz parish church was partly a wooden church, and completed around 1364, before the erection of the first Carmelite monastery in Bydgoszcz (1398). The first mention of a church priest was made on 22 July 1402, a reference to the church dates back to 1408 and the title of the parish church was quoted in a 1417 document. Together with the church a parish school was established.

Part of the church was built of brick, allowing the synod of the diocese of Włocławek to take place here in January 1425. In addition, the northern wall of the present church still bears brick traces of windows and a portal. In 1425, a fire destroyed some elements of the building, probably the wooden roof, while archived city documents were also lost during this disaster, according to Wojciech Łochowski's chronicles.

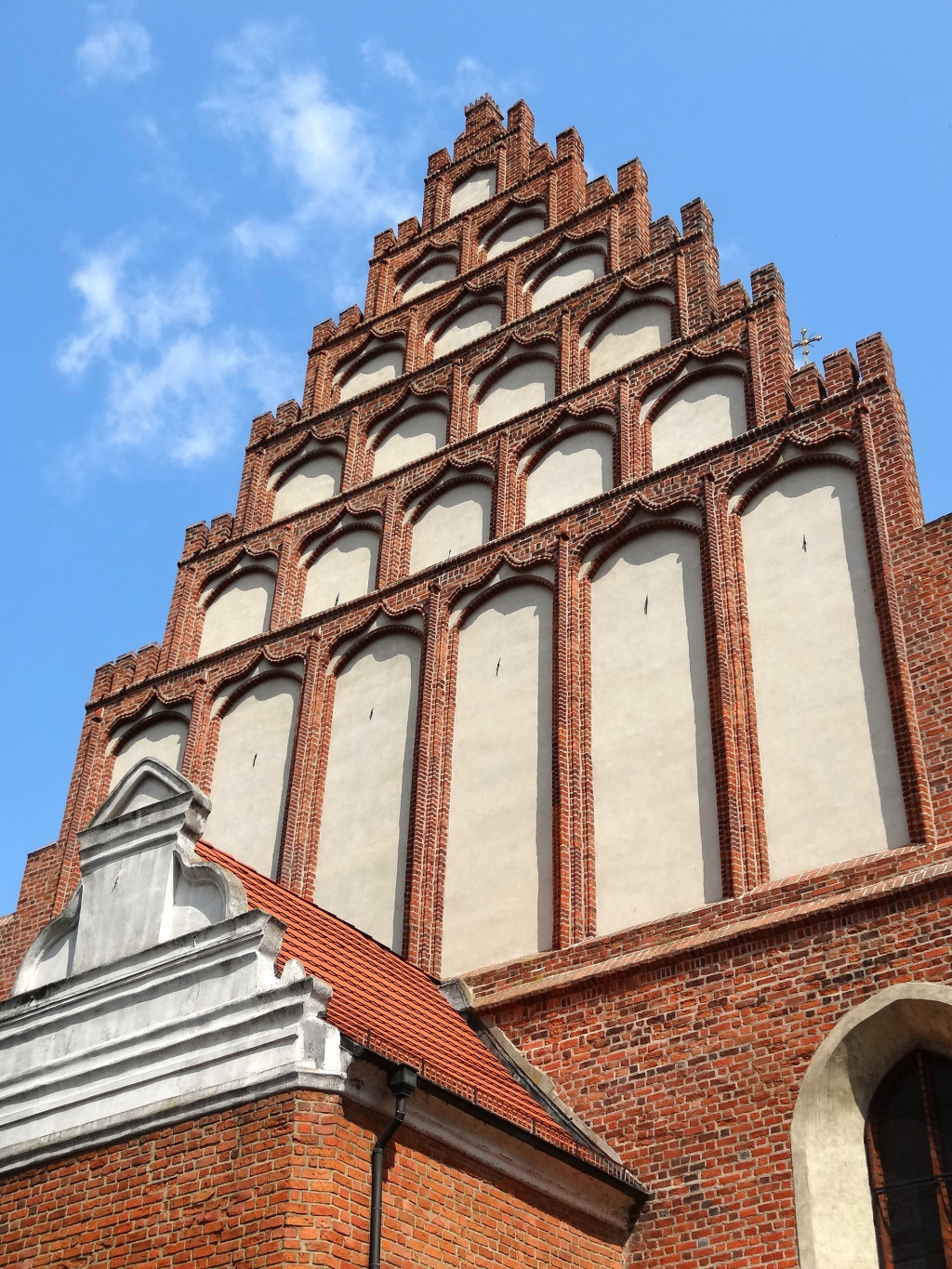
Western façade, with crow-stepped gable

=== Construction of the Gothic temple (1425-1466) ===
The reconstruction of the temple the same year (1425) comprised the enlargement of the main building and the construction of two aisles. Since builders integrated into the new building the northern brick wall from the previous temple, the church displays a chancel wider than the nave by almost 2 metres.

Like other mediaeval religious structures, the construction did not interrupt the liturgical services, as mentioned in 1449 in a document related to the erection of the Holy Trinity Church in the northern suburb of the city (at the location of today's Poor Clares' Church.

Funding for the project, albeit fluctuating, was mainly provided during the Thirteen Years' War (1454–66) against the Teutonic Order, when Bydgoszcz was frequently visited by Casimir IV Jagiellon, his retinue, high ranking clergy, crowds of dignitaries, knights, and by the Margrave of Brandenburg Frederick II or Eric II, Duke of Pomerania. Jan Kościelecki, local power broker and one of the major financial tycoons in Poland at the time (1457–1475), also contributed in a significant way.

The church exterior was completed in 1466: the same year, interior decoration began with the altars being set up:

- Virgin birth of Jesus altar in the northern aisle in 1466;
- Stanislaus of Szczepanów altar (1488);
- main altar realized by Poznań painter Wawrzyniec Stuler, ordered by Bydgoszcz parish priest Mikołaj in 1460.

In 1497, Krzesław Kurozwęcki, bishop of Włocławek, organized there a synod for clergy of Kujawy. For this occasion, the church received additional dedications, complementing the one from the 14th century to Saint Nicholas: it received as patron saints Martin of Tours, Adalbert of Prague and Stanislaus of Szczepanów. The celebration of these dedications was celebrated each year, on the first Sunday after St Bartholomew the Apostle day (i.e. August 24).

The area of the aisle and the chancel, around 604 square metres (6,500 sq ft), was in 1466 the ninth largest parish church in the diocese of Włocławek, after:

- Gdańsk's St. Catherine's Church, St. Mary's Church, St. Jean's church, St. Pierre-St. Paul's church and St. Barbara's church;
- Puck parish church;
- Church of the Holy Cross in Tczew.

Within Kujawy, only the St. Nicholas parish church in Inowroclaw was larger.

=== Expansion of the 16th-18th century ===
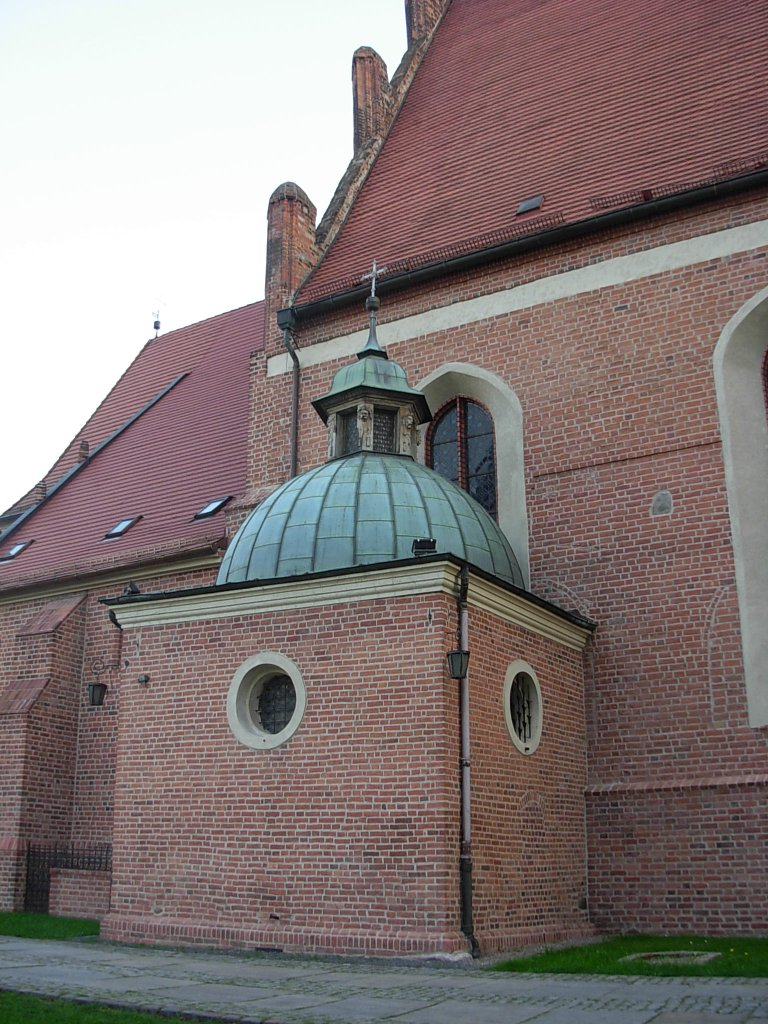
Chapel of the Holy Cross, built in 1617

At the end of the 15th century, roofs were elevated, using pine wood, brought via the Brda river and chopped on the spot, the gable and the presbytery roofs were star-shaped and vaulted. At the same time, the church's southern steeple was attached to the main body.

From 1466 to 1617, three quadrangular chapels were erected and attached to the main body, while a fourth chapel was built at the location of the former presbytery entrance. In 1559, a turret carrying a light bell cast by master Andrzej was set up at the edge of the nave roof; another bell was suspended there in 1668. In 1702, it was replaced by a Baroque turret, covered with bronze. It still stands today: it is octagonal and has a roof lantern. A new bell was ordered for this realization from bellfounder Absalom Wittwerck from Gdańsk.

In 1585, a Gothic rectangular sacristy was erected, abutting the northern chancel wall: an inscription from 1585 was discovered after the Second World War beneath the plaster of the window sill. Between 1712 and 1745, part of the wooden barrel vault ceiling between the two storeys was replaced by a lunette. In the 1650s, major construction and renovation works started:

- the tower received a third storey, as one can see today;
- a mannerist-style porch was built adjacent to the west façade, with an open vestibule in the basement;
- the western part of the timber roof truss over the nave body was replaced after 1651, according to dendrochronological research, including the repair of the tower stairs.

Under the chancel floor were six vaulted burial crypts:

- Two were realized in the eastern part of the north aisle, under the altars of the Virgin Mary and St. Lawrence of Rome;
- The other four were matched with the foundations of the four chapels.

Between 1712 and 1745, the whitewashed walls of the sacristy, the chancel, the nave and the pillars between the naves were covered in some places with figural polychromes. Other decorative elements of the walls were tombstone epitaphs. Most altars and religious furniture from before the Polish partition were destroyed during the Napoleonic Wars.

Larger roof repairs also occurred at the end of the 17th century, after the destruction by the fire in 1684 of the abutting watermill: during the fire, the wind directed the flames to the northern façade of the church. It took 15 years to clean and repair this heavy damage. The catastrophe brought other diocesan parish priests, from 1712 to 1763, to write about the state of quasi-ruin of the temple and its associated buildings, which contrasted with the good condition of other city monasteries and conventual churches: the Carmelites, the Bernardines, the Jesuits. The church, however, survived in this poor position until the start of the partitions of Poland, although no major emergency investment was made.

=== 18th-century buildings ===
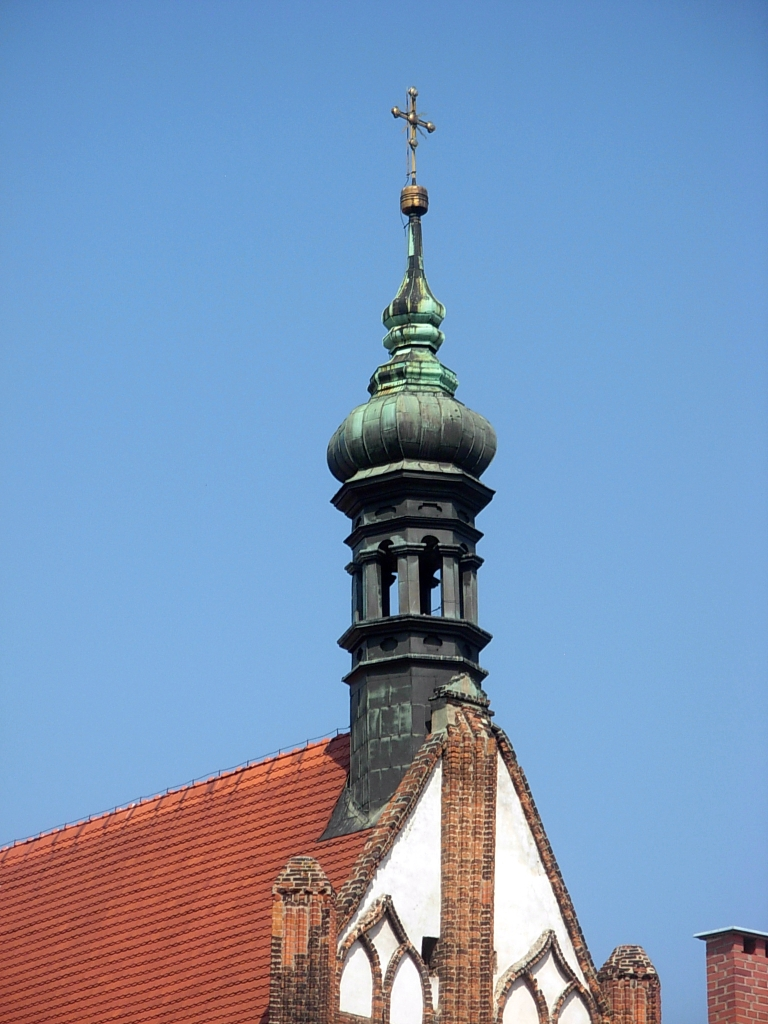
Ridge turret with a roof lantern, on top of the nave roof, set in 1559

By the 18th century many buildings were erected in the vicinity of the church. On the church cemetery premises stood:

- a chapel house;
- a stone statue of John Nepomucene realized in 1745;
- a vaulted crypt located near the church's northern aisle;
- a monolithic chapel and a brick mound in the shape of a crypt.

On the western side of the cemetery, on the area between today's tenement house at Przyrzecze street 2, and the memorial to the Virgin Mary Immaculate Conception of Lourdes, stood a series of buildings comprising the Bydgoszcz parish school building and three houses inhabited by the vicar, his helpers and secular representatives of the church staff. The rectory was located on the eastern edge of the municipal necropolis, on today's Ks. Tadeusza Skarbka-Malczewskiego street.

=== Partition period (1772-1920) ===
At the time of the incorporation of Bydgoszcz/Bromberg into the Kingdom of Prussia as a result of the Partitions of Poland, the parish church was indeed in a poor technical condition. In 1794, for the needs of the Kościuszko Uprising, the silver decoration was depleted, as well as numerous valuables, for a total of 256 grzywna. Other city monasteries also donated to support the revolt, like the Jesuits and the Bernardines.

At the beginning of the 19th century, the church was nearly a ruin. During the period of the Duchy of Warsaw (1807–1815), Russian armed forces used it for military purposes: most of the side altars and removable elements were destroyed at that time.

Between 1819 and 1829, the Kingdom of Prussia funded a refurbishment of the building. During the works, part of the religious equipment was stolen and three side chapels were demolished; the chapel on the northern wall (St. Fabian and Saint Sebastian) survived. Only three old altars were preserved (Blessed Virgin Mary, Saint Barbara, St. Fabian and St. Sebastian), some altars were taken from the other monasteries of the city, liquidated by Prussian authorities:

- two side altars – Saint Roch and Saint Anthony of Padua – from the Bernardine Church (17th to 18th century);
- two side altars – Our Lady of the Scapular and Saint Joseph – from the Carmelite church (17th to 18th century);
- a rococo picture of Carmelite brother Stanisław and four stalls with 18 seats were also taken over from the Carmelites church in Bydgoszcz.

The renovated temple was eventually re-opened in 1831 and reconsecrated. In addition, before 1875, a neo-Gothic annex was erected on the spot of the former chapel of Saint Stephen.

During the Partition period, the temple was the only parish church in the city where the religious and national feeling was still alive among the Poles, especially during the Kulturkampf period.

=== Interwar period ===
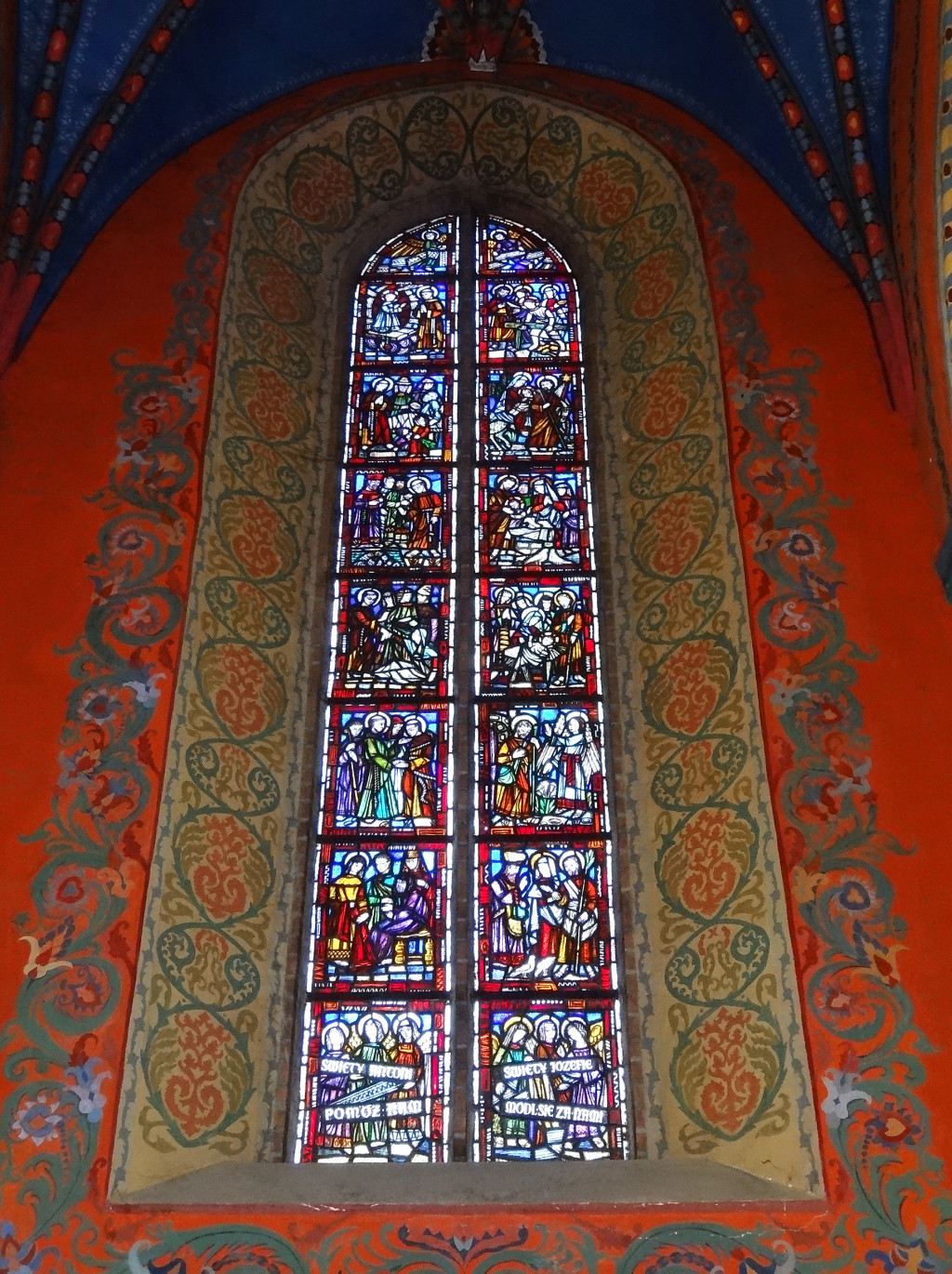
Stained glass window

After the incorporation of Bydgoszcz into the Second Polish Republic's territory in 1920, the parish was divided into five smaller ones, relieving the church of many of the faithful, who had grown to too great a number for the one church: in 1924 the parish comprised 100 thousand people. From 1922 to 1926, the church interiors were completely restored, on the initiative of the then parish priest, Father Tadeusz Skarbek-Malczewski:

- walls and vaults were covered with polychrome motifs executed by Henryk Jackowski-Nostitz, on a design by Stefan Cybichowski (1923–1924);
- stained glass was installed;
- on the main altar, a meticulous restoration of the Virgin Mary with the Rose was carried out.

=== Second World War ===
On January 9, 1940, the parish church was handed over by German occupying forces, formally forbidding any Poles to enter. Its new pastor was Father Alojzy Kaluschke, then prebendary of the Jesuit church on the main Old Square. Most valuable items were pillaged and sent away to Germany; to avoid such pillage, church staff moved part of the religious equipment to country manor houses around Bydgoszcz. For instance, the image of the Virgin Mary with the Rose, identified as a masterpiece, could have been spirited off on July 23, 1943, during the night, to the church of Mąkowarsko, 35 km north of Bydgoszcz. It was brought back to the altar of the side chapel, on September 26, 1945.

Fighting for the liberation of Bydgoszcz (January 1945) caused serious damage to the church: artillery shells burned the roof and destroyed stained glass windows. Shortly after the war, the leaking roof regularly let rain drip into the nave.

=== Postwar period ===
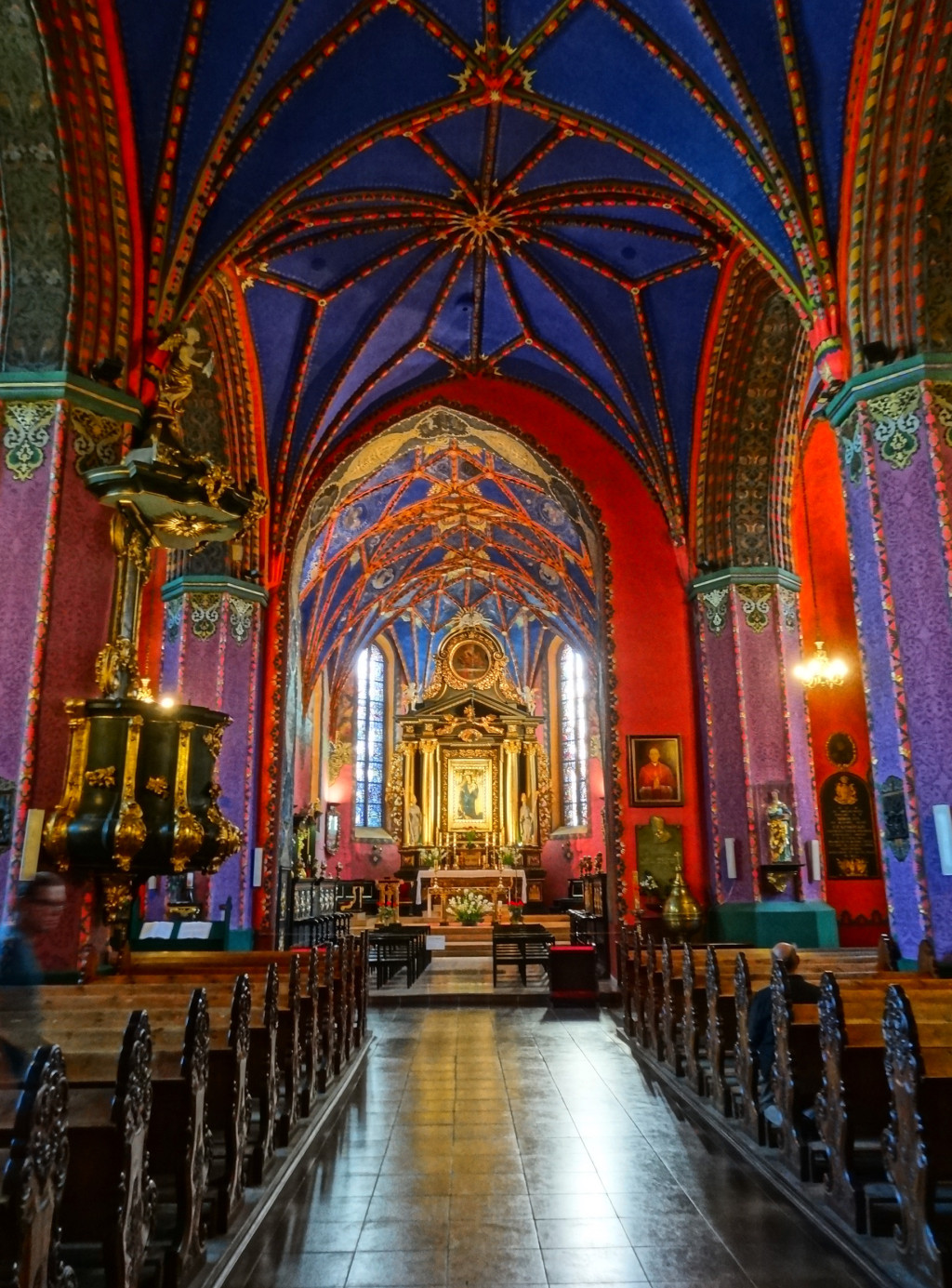
Polychromes of the nave

After the end of World War II, the new parish priest, Father Franciszek Hanelt proceeded to heal war damage and renovate the temple. In 1950, the Madonna and the Rose was moved for conservation to Nicolaus Copernicus University in Toruń. The renovation of the stained glass was realized by Edward Kwiatkowski, lecturer at the Faculty of History and Art of Toruń and a student of Henryk Jackowski-Nostitz, who directed the polychromy of the church before the war, through his stained-glass studio "Polichromia" in Poznań: the technique followed was the one used in the 13th century on Gothic stained-glass windows of the Sainte-Chapelle in Paris. Works at the church lasted from 1952 to 1954.

In 1966, the Primate of Poland, Stefan Wyszyński crowned the image of Madonna with the Rose, titling it Our Lady of Beautiful Love. From 1982 to 1996, Jan Nowak, the Vicar for the city, took residence in the church, before moving to the Diocese of Siedlce as ordinary. On September 5, 1993, the Archbishop of Gniezno, Henryk Muszyński, raised the parish church to the dignity of Collegiate church, establishing a bishopric chapter dedicated to Our Lady of Beautiful Love (Polish: Matki Bożej Pięknej Miłości).

On June 7, 1999, during a Mass celebrated in Bydgoszcz in front of 600,000 people Pope John Paul II granted the parish the title of co-cathedral of the Archdiocese of Gniezno. In 2001, archbishop Henryk Muszyński celebrated the 750th anniversary of the Our Lady of the Scapular, and in 2002, he celebrated the 500th anniversary of the Marian local shrine, for which occasion Pope John Paul II sent a special letter. One year later Jubilee Doors were unveiled and dedicated.

Since 1997, a complete restoration of the church has been carried out, both inside and outside:

- in 2002 the chapel of the Holy Cross, with Art Déco restored polychrome was opened for daily adoration and dedicated to the Sacrament of Penance;
- the statue of St. John the Apostle was restored;
- part of the decor of the altar in the vanished Chapel of St. John was renovated as well.

On March 25, 2004, by decision of Pope John Paul II, the parish church became the Cathedral of the newly created diocese of Bydgoszcz: the Our Lady of Beautiful Love, whose image is set above the main altar, was established as its patroness. Bishop Jan Tyrawa was nominated to the head of the diocese; in 2017, he is still in position. From 2013 to 2015, roof flat tiles covering the chancel, the vestry, the main aisle and the church tower were substituted for Monk and Nun tiles. In addition, work was carried out on the roof over the chancel and the main aisle to recondition the 16th-century pine-wood beam network which required immediate intervention.

== Patrons ==
The first patron of the church was Saint Nicholas of Mira.

During the following consecration, in 1466, four holy bishops were established as patrons: St. Nicholas, St. Martin of Tours, St. Adalbert of Prague and St. Stanislaus the Martyr of Szczepanów.

The full name is rarely used to designate the temple. Apart from any specific patron's office, by and large the temple is called St. Nicholas-St. Martin Church, as mentioned during an 1831 consecration, limiting the church's official name.

== Architecture ==
=== Exteriors ===
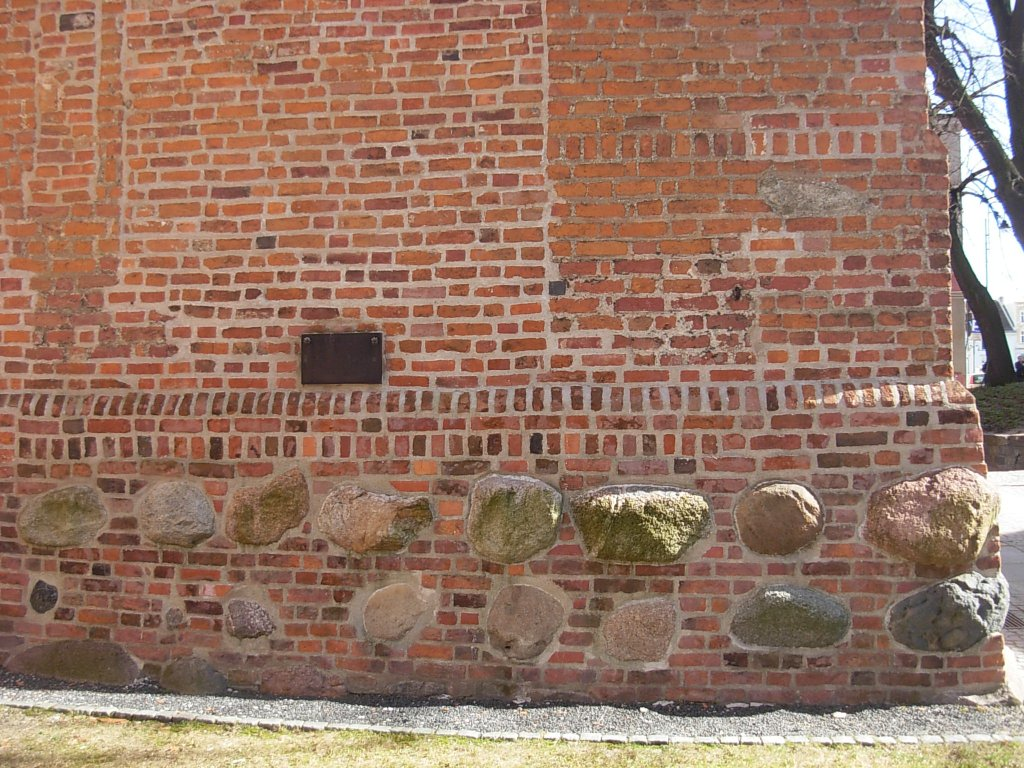
Outside wall, with large bread stones on the bottom

The temple has a Brick Gothic form, with a closed chancel facing east, three naves and a square tower on the south. On the west side is a double-decker porch with arcades, which gives onto the main entrance to the church with the Renaissance oak door (17th century) decorated with Bydgoszcz's coat of arms and bearing the initials of city guilds and townsmen (1925).

The 24 by 24 metres (79 ft) square structure is adorned with pinnacles: the western one is filled with six painted areas, and topped with a crucifix and a triangular angel, from 1848. The triangular eastern peak divides six polygonal lesenes passing through the pinnacle. On the eastern roof tip stands an octagonal Baroque turret roof lantern by Wojciech Łochowski.

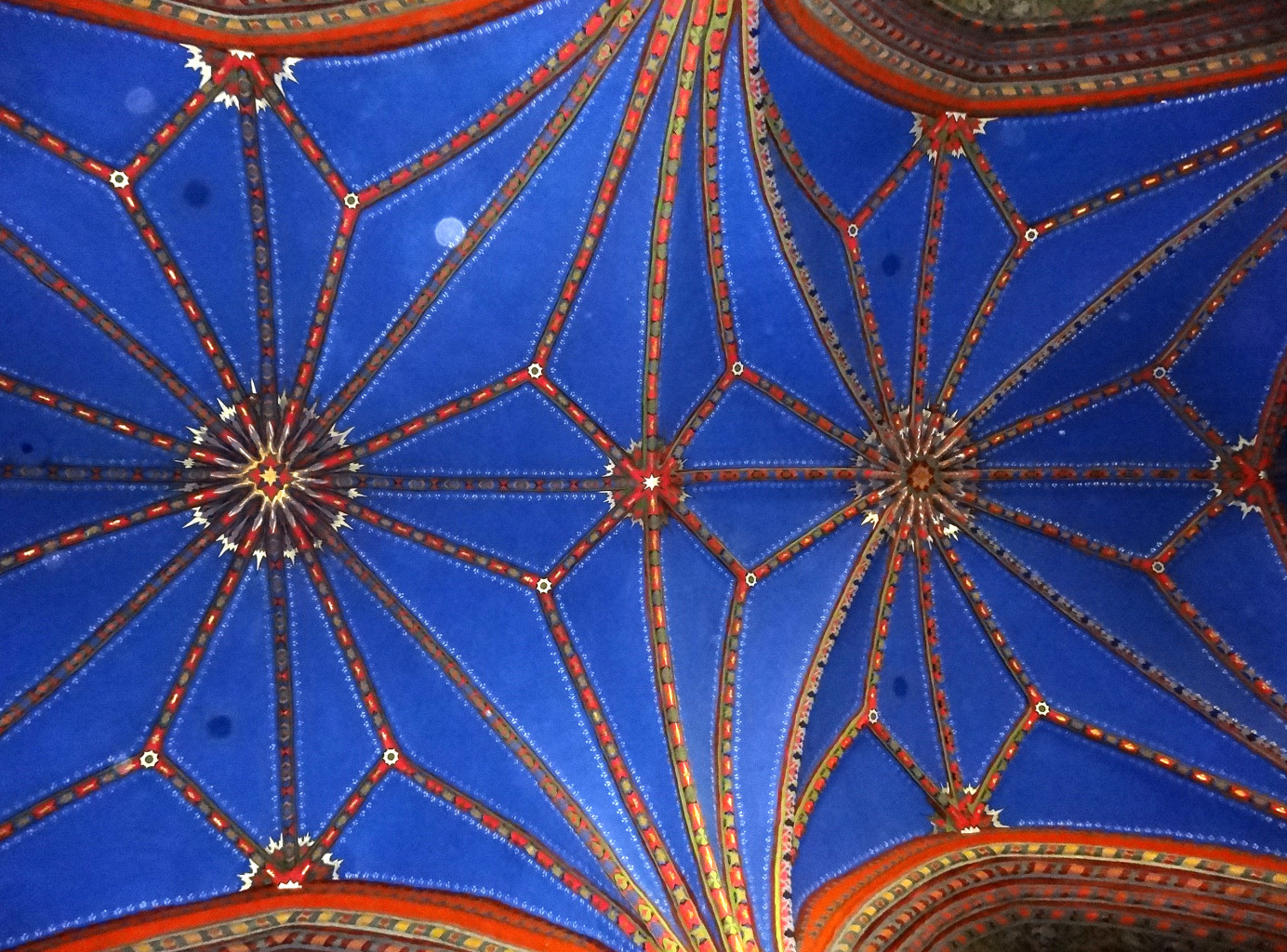
Polychrome vault

The ceiling features different techniques:

- Basic vaulted roof in the chancel;
- Rib vault in the nave;
- Barrel vault with lunettes in the sacristy (17th-18th century);
- Groin vault in the western vestibule (16th-17th century);
- Dome with Neo-Gothic fan vaults in the porch under the tower (19th-20th century).

These ornaments in the arch network are characteristic of the late Polish Gothic architecture. At the bottom of the south wall are the so-called Bread stones (Polish: kamienie chlebowe), supposed to save the daily bread of the parishioners, according to the conviction of the then builders.

The window openings in the chancel and the aisles are topped with pointed arches. The octagonal pillars of interiors, set on pedestals and crowned with cornices, carry spear-glass arcades. The chancel walls are crowned with a Gothic frieze and a Baroque profiled cornice. The church's three-storey tower is divided into three parts by ring friezes. The highest floor was built during the renovation of the church in 1650. It can be assumed that the wooden tower was previously crowned by a tower. The porch under the south boasts a Gothic portal from the second half of the 15th century.

==== Chapel ====
The only surviving chapel of the original building stands by the northern wall. It is a small square building displaying oculi on the outside three walls, capped with a Renaissance dome topped by a roof lantern with a bell-shaped roof and a cross from 1617.

The thin pilasters of the roof lantern display mascarons, while each oculus is sheltered by grillwork. The dome outside is covered metal, while the interior reveals Art Déco polychrome. Initially separated from the main building by a grille, the entrance to the chapel was changed in 2002 to glazing, allowing daily adoration of the Sacrament of Penance.

=== Interiors ===
The interior of the temple displays Baroque decor from the 17th century. The main ornaments reside in the seven Baroque altars, with altar frontals and old paintings and sculptures.

The most valuable item is the Gothic painting of the Madonna with the Rose (1467). Also notable are:

- a Renaissance crucifix (1525) in the chapel of the Holy Cross;
- a picture of St. Anthony of Padua (1550–1600, Florentine school);
- a picture of St. Barbara (1650–1700);
- a picture of St. Joseph with a young Christ (1690);
- the Baroque image of Our Lady of the Scapular (1700);
- a picture of St. Roch (1841).

==== Altars ====
| Name | Location | Description | Picture |
|---|---|---|---|
| Virginity of Mary of Nazareth, Saint Nicholas, Saint Martin | East end of the nave (main altar) | Baroque main altar with polychrome (ca 1666, renovated in 1922–1926). Altarpiece with statues of Bishops St. Martin and St. Nicholas, two angels carrying the Chalice, two angels in the upper level and a dove on the top. In the centre of the altar stands in a golden frame the Gothic-Renaissance Our Lady of Beautiful Love (Polish: Matki Bożej Pięknej Miłości), holding a rose in his hand, with the figure of the donor kneeling at her feet (1475–1500). In the upper level, a circular Baroque picture of the Assumption of Mary, with a pair of kneeling founders and coats of arms (beginning of the 18th century). Under the windows, on both sides of the altar are two Baroque candlesticks (18th-19th century). | |
| Our Lady of the Scapular | Northern end side of the nave | Baroque altar (1650–1700) with sculptures of two nuns, two angels on the upper pediment and a bust of God the Father on the top. Standing between the nuns, the famous image of Our Lady of the Scapular of Bydgoszcz, silver-plated dressed. Initially called Our Lady of Mount Carmel (ca. 1700), it comes from the vanished Carmelite Church of Bydgoszcz (located on today's Theatre square). On the upper level is set an image of the Holy Family (17th-18th century). | |
| Saint Joseph | Southern end side of the nave | Polychrome altar from the vanished Carmelite church, with Baroque paintings in the middle: St. Joseph with a young Christ (1650–1700) and the Holy Family on the sledge (beginning of the 17th century, originating from the former chapel of St. Anne). The altarpiece features St. Andrew the Apostle and St. Peter (1650–1700), on the upper level an image of the Annunciation to Mary and sculptures of two monks topped by an angel. | |
| St. Barbara | Northern wall, northern nave | Late Baroque altar (1700–1750) with painting of St. Barbara in the middle (1650–1700, Italian or Flemish origin), flanked by two sculptures of nuns. on the upper level, picture of St. Lawrence (18th century). | |
| Saint Anthony of Padua | Southern nave | Altar (beginning of the 18th century), coming from the Bernardine Church of Our Lady Queen of Peace on Bernardyńska Street in Bydgoszcz, with a Baroque painting of St. Anthony with the Jesus Child (1550–1600, Florentine school), painted on tinplate and silver-plated dress (1700–1750). Above the pediment, a painting of Mourning (early 19th century) topped by a reliquary (17th century, transformed). In 2014, the altar was renovated and restored to its original colours (originally dark, orange, green). The altar has been repainted only four times since its inception. | |
| Saint Roch | Southern nave | Altar (1696), donated by Stanisław and Helena Konarski, coming from the Bernardine Church of Our Lady Queen of Peace on Bernardyńska Street in Bydgoszcz. In the middle, a picture of St. Roch (1841) in a silver robe, with an angel holding a scarf with the inscription: Eris in peste patronus (Latin You will be the guardian during the plague). In the upper level, a Baroque painting of the Martyrdom of Crispin and Crispinian (1690). During preservation works in 2016–2017, the original 17th-century altar details were discovered, preserved beneath carvings from the middle of the 19th century. | |
| Holy Cross | Holy Cross Chapel | Polychrome Baroque altar (ca. 17th century, transformed in the 19th century and ca. 1920) with sculptures: in the middle, a Renaissance crucifix (1525) on a more recent background, on sides figures of St. Gregory and St. Veronica. Bas-relief of the Easter Resurrection on the upper level. On the bottom, a tabernacle adorned with carved motifs of acanthus (ca. 1730). On the floor, tombs of the city's mayors: Wojciech Łochowski (1630s) and Marcin Orłowita (1620s). | |

==== Relics ====
In the 15th century, relics, displayed for public viewing, rested in six silver crosses gilded with pearls and precious stones. The 18th-century relic collection included the remains of nine saints: St. Andrew the Apostle, St Castulus, St Felicitas of Rome, St. Boniface and St. Urban – early Christian martyrs, St. Cecilia and St. Catherine of Alexandria – Virgins and Early Christian martyrs, St. Adalbert and St. Nicholas – bishops and patrons of the church. This collection was lost in the 19th century when the reliquaries were destroyed.

Today, the church reliquary keeps 17 bones of one of the 11,000 virgins, companions of Saint Ursula, which were acquired by the Bernardine Church of Our Lady Queen of Peace. The relics are deposited in the tabernacle altar of St. Anthony.

==== Decor and religious items ====
The church still possesses part of its original furniture, items that survived damage and looting. It also inherited religious articles from no longer extant churches in Bydgoszcz, especially the Carmelite and Bernardine ones, after the secularization of monastic convents decided by the Prussian authorities in the 1830s.

Notable religious artefacts

| Name | Location | Description | Picture |
|---|---|---|---|
| Sculpture of Saint John the Apostle | At the end of the southern nave, near the altar of St. Joseph | From the lost Jesuit Church of St. Ignatius of Loyola on the old market square: a figure stood in a window niche in a 17th-century chapel of St. John, demolished in the 1920s. In 1927, it was moved to the district museum of Bydgoszcz. After a renovation in 2000, the sculpture was returned to the cathedral. | |
| Pulpit | Fixed on a pillar between naves | 18th-century rococo pulpit, coming from the gone Carmelite's church. On the backdrop, a picture (1750–1800) depicting the 1420 martyrdom of Carmelite Stanisław of Bydgoszcz. | |
| Side walls of the chancel | Carmelite choir stalls | Polychrome, wooden Rococo-style stalls (1750–1800), coming from the vanished Carmelite church. Lined along both walls, seven seats in each booth. Each stall background is painted with images of saints and blessed figures. | |
| Choir stalls | On the western wall | Carved wood, Rococo-style: a row of 6 and a row of 7 seats. Original church stalls, mentioned in 1763. | |
| Confessional | On the side walls and in the chapel of the Holy Cross. | Two Baroque confessionals (1750–1800) on the south wall, three on the north wall (18th century). | |
| Wrought iron grille | In the chancel, under the pipe organ | The passage under the church pipe organ is closed by three ornamented wrought-iron grilles from the 16th–17th century. A contemporary grille closes the access to stairs leading to the organ. A 1600–1650 Baroque grille at the entrance to the chapel of the Holy Cross, belonging to the Poor Clares' Church in Bydgoszcz, was returned to its original location in the 1950s. | |
| Stained glass windows | In the chancel, on the western wall | Five stained-glass windows were executed by Henryk Jackowski-Nostitz from Poznań (1923–1924), and after the war, a renovation was performed by his student, Edward Kwiatkowski from Toruń (1949–1954). Two stained-glass windows in the chancel have been made according to the 13th-century technique used in the Gothic Church of Sainte-Chapelle in Paris. They display Mariological themes, presenting the Mysteries of the Rosary, mingled with the invocations related to the Litany of the Blessed Virgin Mary. Each of stained-glass window consists of 36 panes (70 × 80 cm), with coloured glass (mainly red, yellow, green and blue), framed with lead and tin. | |
| Polychrome | On walls, vaults, pillars | The entire interior polychrome was realized between 1922 and 1925, by Henryk Jackowski-Nostitz from Poznań according to Stefan Cybichowski's design and restored after 2000. The tips of the pillars in the nave are decorated with emblems: an eagle, a Pomeranian griffin and Bydgoszcz's Coat of arms. | |
| Baptismal font | Between the nave and the chancel | Late Renaissance, brass and gold-plated, decor depicting holy scenes: St. Adalbert of Prague, St. Nicholas and the Baptism of Jesus. The artefact was founded in 1611 by Wojciech Łochowski, mayor of Bydgoszcz: it bears his house mark and monogram. The item is enclosed in a wooden balustrade, with Regency-style ornamented grille (ca. 1730). | |
| Stations of the Cross | On the walls and pillars between the naves | Stations realized in 1910 by Polish sculptor Franciszek Black. | |
| Jubilee Doors | Entrance to the porch | Executed on the occasion of the triple jubilee: the 2000th anniversary of Christianity, the 1000th anniversary of the Metropolis of Gniezno and the 500th anniversary of the parish church of Bydgoszcz. Doors were realized by sculptor Michał Kubiak from Bydgoszcz, and dedicated on April 20, 2003, by Henryk Muszyński, Archbishop of Gniezno. On both sides are presented scenes related to Christianity and the diocesan church. | |

In addition to this list, other items date back to pre-Partition period:

- A dozen vases and liturgical vestments from the 16th to 18th centuries (monstrance, pyx, chalice, two patens, two incense caskets, four candlesticks and four chasubles);
- Five tombstones (16th-17th century);
- One epitaph (17th century);
- A stone holy water font, located under the southern tower porch (15th century).

==== Tombstones and commemorative plaques ====
In the church's porch and inside the building are several dozen commemorative plaques and tombstones, partly from the pre-Partition period. Outside, other plaques have been placed on the walls of the church and memorial monuments have been established.

| Location | Date | Description | Picture |
|---|---|---|---|
| Northern aisle, western wall | 1580 | Stone epitaph to Bydgoszcz mayor Stanisław Grzymała | |
| Southern nave wall, next to St. Roch altar | 1630 | Baroque, black marble gravestone. Cartouche inscription to Marcin Orłowit (1560–1630), Bydgoszcz mayor and founder of the bygone chapel of St. Anne. | |
| South wall of the chancel | 17th c. | Baroque tombstone with coat of arms of Wojciech Łochowski (died 1651), Bydgoszcz mayor and author of chronicles. | |
| On the west wall, above the stalls. | 17th c. | Łochowski's family tombstone | |
| End of the southern nave | 1833 | Black marble gravestone of Mikołaj Hutten-Czapski (Polish General, 1753–1833), with Leliwa coat of arms, panoply and medallion bearing the portrait of the deceased surrounded by a stuccoed laurel wreath. | |
| Outside, southern wall of the chancel | 1948 | Plaque to parish priests Father Józef Schulz, Jan Jakubowski, Stanisław Kopci and Antoni Świadek, murdered by Nazi armed forces during World War II (1939–1945). | |
| Inside the church porch | 1949 | Commemorative plaque to the 47 murdered Bydgoszcz merchants, from the bygone Resursa Kupiecka (restaurant and entertainment facility in Jagiellońska street, torn down in the 1950s). | |
| Outside wall | 1962 | Plaques to the Renaissance chapels lost between 1815 and 1830: Saint Anne (donated by the Orłowity family in 1555), Saint Stephen (donated by the Stegfan Bogurski in 1605), Saint John the Evangelist (donated by the Rychłowski family in 1612). | |
| Inside the church porch | | Plaque commemorating Father Tadeusz Skarbek-Malczewski and the artists who carried out the renovation of the church in 1922–1926. | |
| Inside the church porch | 1978 | Plaque commemorating the Greater Poland uprising (1918–1919) and the Polish troops who entered Bydgoszcz on January 20, 1920. | |
| Inside the church porch | 1979 | Plaque commemorating the murder by Nazis of Leon Barciszewski, Mayor of Bydgoszcz, and his son Janusz, on November 11, 1939. | |
| Southern wall, next to St. Anthony altar | 1992 | Brass epitaph dedicated to the memory of the Cardinal Stefan Wyszyński, Primate of the Millennium (1901–1981), and auxiliary bishops of Gniezno Archdiocese: Lucjan Bernacki (1902–1975) and Jan Michalski (1914–1989). Plaque realized by sculptor Aleksander Dętkoś from Bydgoszcz. | |
| Southern nave wall | 1997 | Bronze plaque devoted to the memory of Father Franciszek Hanelt, church parishioner (1946–1971), with a portrait of the deceased in a medallion. | |
| Outside, southern wall | 2000 | Memorial stone commemorating the 1000 years of the metropolis of Gniezno. | |
| Outside, southern wall | 2002 | Memorial stone commemorating Bydgoszcz lawyers who died during World War II. | |
| Inside the church porch | 2002 | Plaque commemorating the soldiers of the 16th Greater Poland Uhlan Regiment-Gustaw Orlicz-Dreszer killed in 1939–1945. | Right plaque |
| Inside the church porch | 2002 | Plaque commemorating labour camps and Siberian gulags, funded by the Union of Siberians (Polish: Związek Sybiraków), Polish association regrouping former exiles. | Left plaque |
| End of the southern nave | 2002 | Plaque commemorating the apostolic visit of Pope John Paul II to Bydgoszcz on June 7, 1999. | |
| Inside the church porch | 2003 | Plaque commemorating the Jubilee Doors, founded on the occasion of the 500th anniversary of the parish church and the 1000th anniversary of the archdiocese of Gniezno. | |

==== Organ ====
First original church organ was used until 1763: at this date, the city funded a new instrument, with pedals, two keyboards and five bellows, which played until the 19th century. The church organ was built by Paul Voelkner around 1907. The tracker action instrument has 28 pipes, 2 manual keyboards and one pedal keyboard. It is not certain whether the organ was built for the cathedral: Lech Łikki states in his Bydgoszcz guide that parish authorities transferred the instrument from the demolished Jesuit church in 1940. It has been probably rebuilt during World War II by a firm of Gdańsk. Thorough refurbishments were carried out in 1965 and in the 1980s.

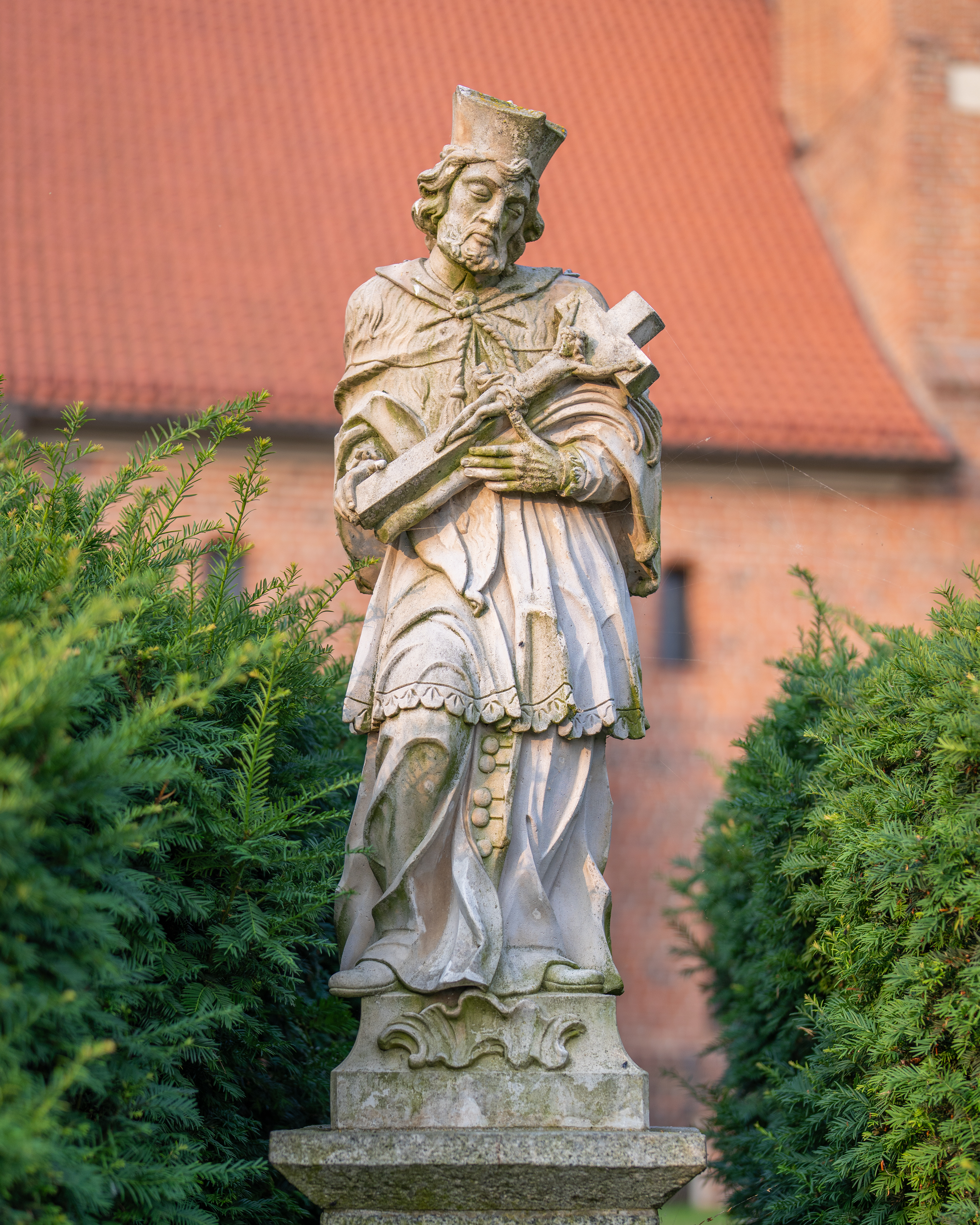
Statue of St. John Nepomucene

=== Statue of John Nepomucene ===
There is no precise early history of the figure. Its existence is first mentioned in 1745, when a visitation of Bromberg parish occurred. It is thought the execution of the statue can be dated back to the first years after the canonization of the priest, in 1729. The figure was placed on the southern side of the parish church at the beginning of the 19th century, where was then the parish cemetery: it stood on a 3 metres (9.8 ft) high brick pillar, its head crowned with five stars. In 1762, municipal authorities financed the Lamp to St. John Nepomucene, which allowed the sculpture to be illuminated in the same way as more famous representations at the time, in Prague or Kowary. The relocation of the statue to the bank of the Brda river happened in the 1950s after a restoration work led by Father Franciszek Ksawer Hanelt, then parish priest. Ground levelling in 1954 necessitated the demolition of the original brick pillar, replaced by a granite pedestal; during these works, the star crowning the figure was removed.

Today the statue is located on a square, north of the cathedral, on a bridle of the Brda river, nearby the Parish weir (Polish: Jaz Farny). The figure, made of carved sandstone, is 1.4 metres (4.6 ft) tall. Its granite pedestal is 1.63 metres (5.3 ft) high. The saint is dressed in priestly robes, featuring Baroque style: a cassock and a surplice -similar to those reserved for prelate and canon, a Roman amice and a biretta on his head. He holds a crucifix with both hands, to remind his tied hands during his martyrdom (drowned in the Vltava river).

== Veneration of the Marian images in the church ==
=== Image of Our Lady of Beautiful Love ===
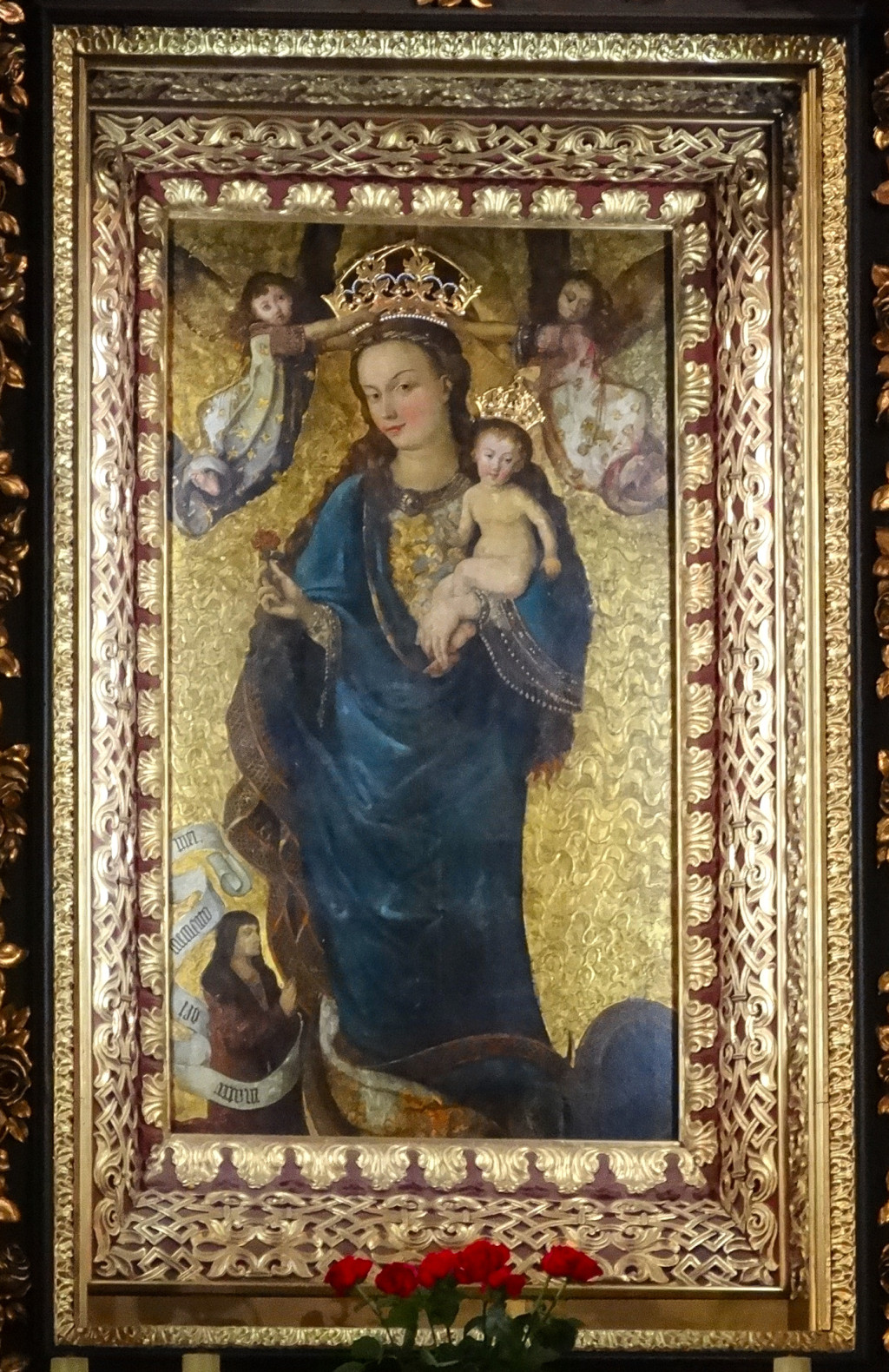
Our Lady of Beautiful Love

Veneration of the image dates back to the Renaissance period. In the 16th century, a rich collection of Marian votive offerings had been gathered. According to descriptions between 1712 and 1745, on a tin background, pictures were star-crowned and silver-and-gold-dressed. As a mark of thankfulness, items were hung on them: votives, coral strings, jewels, earpieces, chains, medals, scapulars, pendants or ribbons. Two magnificent votives contributed to the city's renown. One of them, donated before 1745 and displaying Bydgoszcz's coat of arms, contained a ritualized image of the Mother of God. The majority of the votives offered between the Partition period and the end of the 18th century were dedicated to the support of the Kosciuszko Insurrection.

The 15th-century Virgin Mary with a Rose had been placed in the northern aisle of the parish church, and its reputation grew from the middle of the 17th century, making the church play an attractive role among local Marian believers. It is possible that the painting was created under the influence of Rhenish and Flemish painting in Poland.

From 1699 to 1712, the painting was associated with pontifical indulgences on the way to Purgatory, under the authority of the Holy See, renewed every ten years by the ordinary. From 1772 to 1920, Prussian occupation brought down the cult of the miraculous image. It regained momentum after the re-recreation of the independent Polish state in 1918, and was even more important after the end of World War II. During the war, Nazi authorities ordered this icon – like most valuable museum and church collections – to be transported out of Bydgoszcz. The Virgin Mary with a Rose was then moved on July 23, 1943, to the church of Mąkowarsko, 35 kilometres (22 mi) north of Bydgoszcz. It stayed here, on the altar of a side chapel, till September 26, 1945. In 1950, the painting was restored in workshops in Toruń.

The Virgin Mary with a Rose was twice crowned:

- The first coronation occurred on May 29, 1966, at the Church of Our Lady of Perpetual Help in Bydgoszcz, by Stefan Wyszyński, Primate of Poland, who gave it its official name, Matki Bożej Pięknej Miłości;
- The second one took place on June 7, 1999, led by Pope John Paul II. During a mass followed by 600,000 believers at Bydgoszcz airfield, the Pope decorated the image with two new crowns for the Mother and the Son.

This second coronation influenced the image's popularity, spurring the clergy to organize a permanent mission of confession in the cathedral to satisfy the constant presence of people praying before the picture.

On March 25, 2004, Pope John Paul II created the Roman Catholic Diocese of Bydgoszcz, with Our Lady of Beautiful Love and Michał Kozal as co-patrons.

=== Image of Our Lady of the Scapular in Bydgoszcz ===
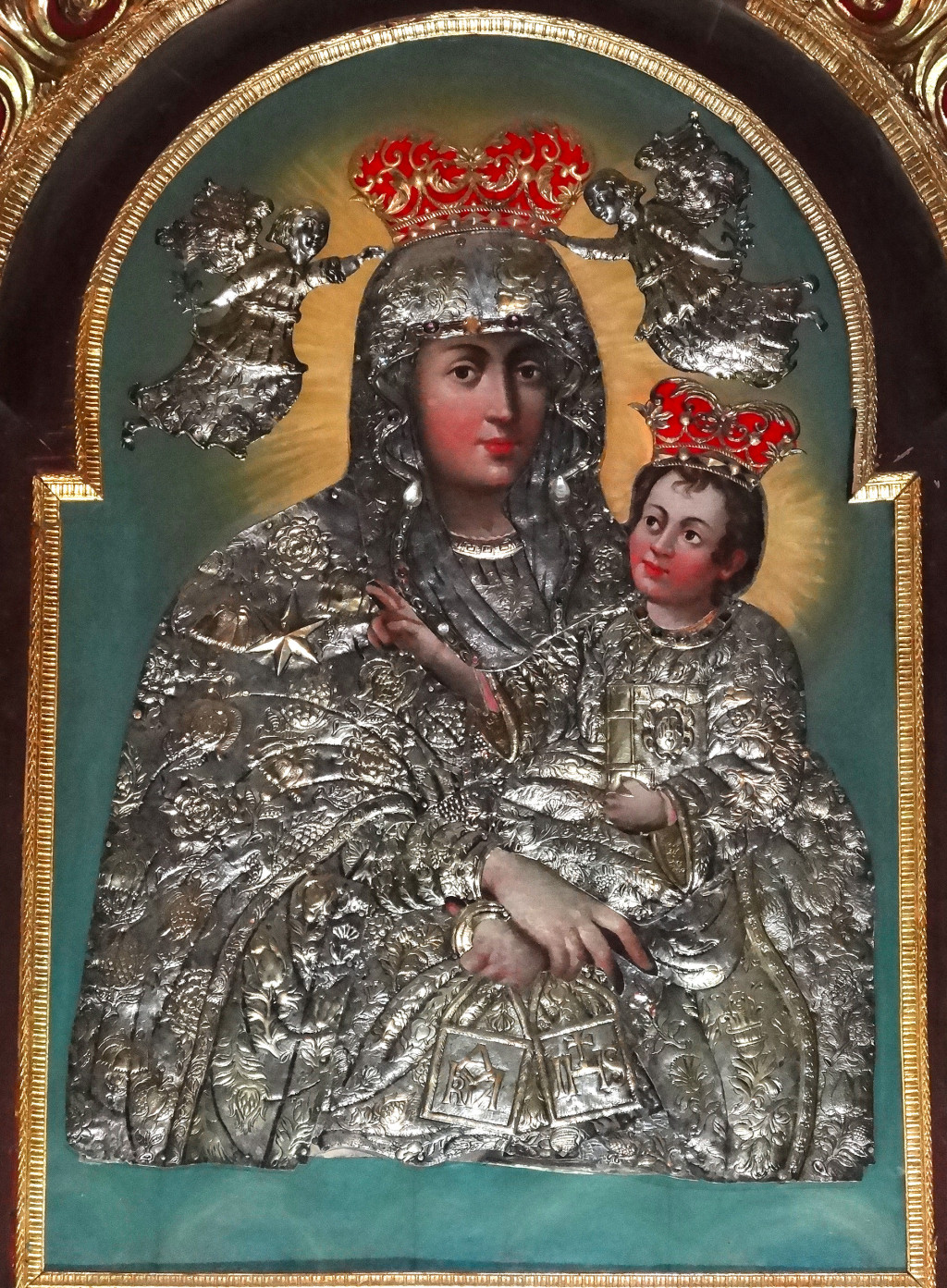
Our Lady of the Scapular

The history of the cult of the image is related to the presence of the Carmelite Monastery in Bydgoszcz since 1397, whose pastoral activity was centred on conducting Marian services and the promotion of religious confraternity. An important element of the Carmelite service was the cult of the scapular as a protection against damnation. It was introduced after a vision received by Saint Simon Stock in 1251, in which Mary is said to have appeared and given him the Carmelite habit, the Brown Scapular, which several Popes confirmed as a Carmelite privilege. In 1470, in the Carmelite Church was created the Brotherhood of Our Lady of the Scapular, after having received approval by Father Bernard, head of the Czech-Polish Carmelite Province. The Brotherhood had a structure, closely mirroring the hierarchy of the Carmelite Order: elders carried the title of priors and sub-priors, the fraternity included seven consuls, whose task was to settle organizational matters, two arbitrators who solved disputes, and two settlers to settle legal problems. There were no titular dignitaries, each member being committed to specific actions. Noble patrons were members of the Voivode or the Castellan of Brzesko-Kujawski, Bydgoszcz Starosta or were representatives of the country nobility. The selected noble supporters were approved by the monastery, while the clergymen were always Carmelite preachers. Upon entering the fraternity, the brother received his scapular.

In the second half of the 17th century, the Brotherhood of the Scapular became a mass organization, with influence extending far beyond the Bydgoszcz premises, reaching lands south of Wągrowiec and north of Warmia and Kwidzyn. The fraternity was prosperous, receiving numerous donations and owned four banks – two in Bydgoszcz, one in Gniezno and one in Fordon. The most important day for the Brotherhood was on July 16, during the Our Lady of Mount Carmel feast, being the celebration of both the Carmelite Order and the Brotherhood. It was celebrated solemnly, with processions in all the city. On the other hand, Good Friday was the period when public scourging was performed in the Carmelite church of Bydgoszcz, together with some professional guilds (e.g. potters and helmsmen).

After the secularization imposed by Prussian authorities in the 1810s, the Carmelite Monastery in Bydgoszcz was closed (1816) and Carmelite Church was razed (1822): the Brotherhood of the Scapular moved to St. Martin-St. Nicholas parish church, bringing also their altar. In 1888, thanks to the efforts of the parish priest, Józef Choraszewski, the Archdiocese of Gniezno granted the Brotherhood the responsibility to maintain the altar and the paintings. In 1927, the fraternity was 284 members strong, but by the 1930s it had dropped down to 100.

Our Lady of the Scapular in Bydgoszcz has been crowned twice:

- The first coronation happened before the Partition period, but the exact date is not known.
- The second coronation took place on July 16, 2001, led by Archbishop Henryk Muszyński, while celebrating the Jubilee-750th anniversary of the Scapular of Our Lady of Mount Carmel.

== Church-related facilities ==
=== Parish school ===
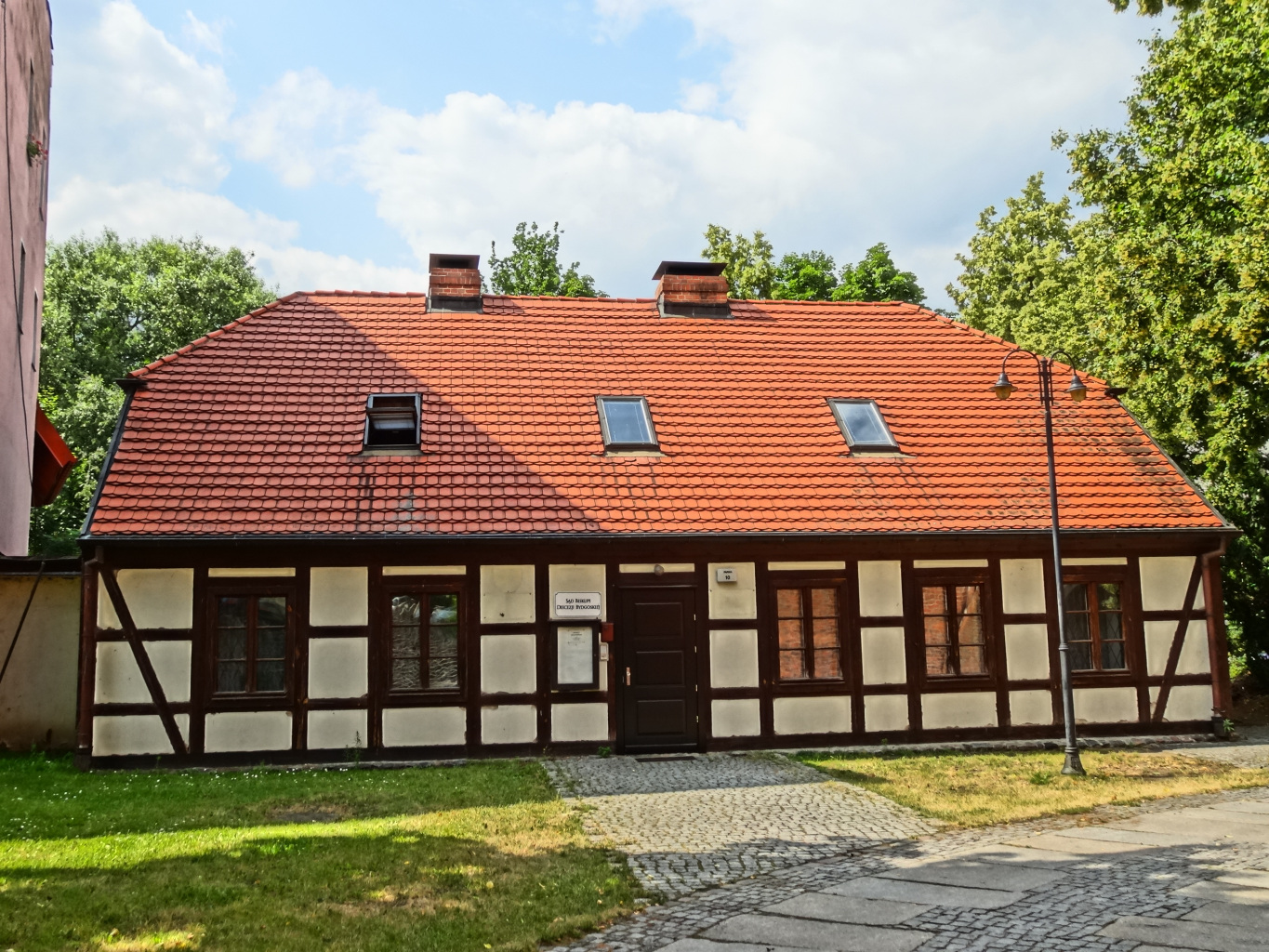
Former parish school building

The exact date of creation of the parish school in Bydgoszcz is unknown, but its origins are related to the creation of the parish church in Bydgoszcz, and the privileges associated with it, around 1346. The building opened after the middle of the 14th century: the first graduates travelled to Kraków to the Jagiellonian University around 1419 The parish school was an institution in the city landscape and in the awareness of its inhabitants, being then housed in a brick building containing several chambers, on the edge of the churchyard cemetery, on the plot of today's house at Przyrzecze street 2. In 1532, about 150 boys were registered, making it an important school at the time. It was then managed by the parish priest of the church. The main task of the school was to educate the youth, who later would perform the duties of priests. However, in the 15th century, its role changed in favour of a more "secular" curriculum. The higher degree (Latin: quadrivium) covered arithmetic, geometry, music and astronomy. Further studies were possible in collegiate, and later at university. In the 17th century, the school declined, a victim of the competition from the newly opened Jesuit College and established academic institutions in Gdańsk, Elbląg, Toruń or Chełmno.

By the beginning of the 18th century, the building was almost ruined, despite the efforts of the town council to take over the totality of school's costs. The building itself was used as a barn, and pupils transferred to a basic house erected on the eastern wall of the sacristy, furnished with benches and tiled stables. During Prussian times, the actual building was erected (1834–1854) to meet the needs of the parish school, on the site of the older derelict edifice.

In 1947 the building was transformed into a parish kindergarten. In 1982, the newly appointed Vicar of Bydgoszcz, Jan Viktor Nowak, inaugurated in the house the Primate Institute of Christian Culture – Cardinal Stefan Wyszyński (Polish: Prymasowski Instytut Kultury Chrześcijańskiej). In 1989, the institute was granted the status of State higher education institution. Since 1998, it has been an official section of Poznań Theological University. With the creation of the Diocese of Bydgoszcz in 2004, and the move, three years later, of the seat of the High Seminary of Bydgoszcz Diocese to the historic building at Grodzka Street 18, it was also decided to move the Primate Institute there. Since that time, the former parish school has housed the library of the Primate Institute of Christian Culture.

=== The parish library ===
Opened specially for the use of priests and parish school staff, the parish library counted 144 manuscripts and printed books in 1712, 104 volumes in 1745, but only 97 in 1763. In the 17th century, during the library's heyday, Jakub Ignacy Włodzimierski, parish priest of Bydgoszcz and Solecki, moved manuscripts away in 1686 to Solec Kujawski.

A small portion of the library's resources were used daily: mainly copies of the Bible and liturgical or musical books (about 27 volumes of Missals, agendas, breviaries, antiphonaries, graduals, psalms). Other book addressed predominantly works of theology, philosophy, ethics, canon law, clerical topics, including collections of sermons, hagiographies, comments on the Old and New Testaments, and apologetic writings directed against Lutheranism and Calvinism.

In the 18th century, the parish library was one of the richest in the city in terms of books, behind the Bernardine Monastery Library, which owned approximately 1500 volumes. In 1829, at the dissolution of the monastery, most precious manuscripts of the library were transferred a few years later to the parish church where they survived until 1907, when they were moved to the Provincial and Municipal Public Library.

=== Cemetery ===
The church cemetery was founded in the 14th century, at the time of the creation of the parish and the construction of the church, and was used until the end of the 18th century. Before Polish Partition, clergymen, patricians and Polish nobles were buried in decorated crypts located underneath the church chancel, naves and chapels.

Prussian authorities closed this cemetery and established another one called the Old Parish Cemetery (Polish: Cemetarz Starofarny) further north, well separated from the church.

In 1906, Father Ryszard Markwart, parish priest, founded on the northern outskirts of Bromberg a New Parish Cemetery (Polish: Nowofarny Cemetery), to solve the problem of capacity of the old graveyard.

=== Bells ===
The first documents relating to the church bells date back to the middle of the 17th century. Bydgoszcz mayor Wojciech Łochowski reported in his Chronicles that they were hung in the bell tower at the beginning of the 16th century, and also, by 1660, in a small ridge turret, tin-covered, standing by the edge of the roof temple.

During 18th-century parish visits, four bells were listed:

- Marcin, 475 kilograms (1,047 lb), cast in 1652 at Augustyn Koesche's workshop in Toruń. On its body was carved a prayer to St. Martin, with the casting date (1652);
- Maria, about 300 kilograms (660 lb), cast by Gerard Bennigek in 1651;
- Mikołaj, about 400 kilograms (880 lb), had a diameter of 1.19 metres (3.9 ft). It was cast by Mikołaj Petersilge's workshop in Toruń in 1758, and re-cast in 1864, keeping the original inscriptions;
- Holy Spirit, 190 kilograms (420 lb), founded in 1642 by Augustyn Koesche's workshop. It was re-melted in 1865, keeping the original engravings.

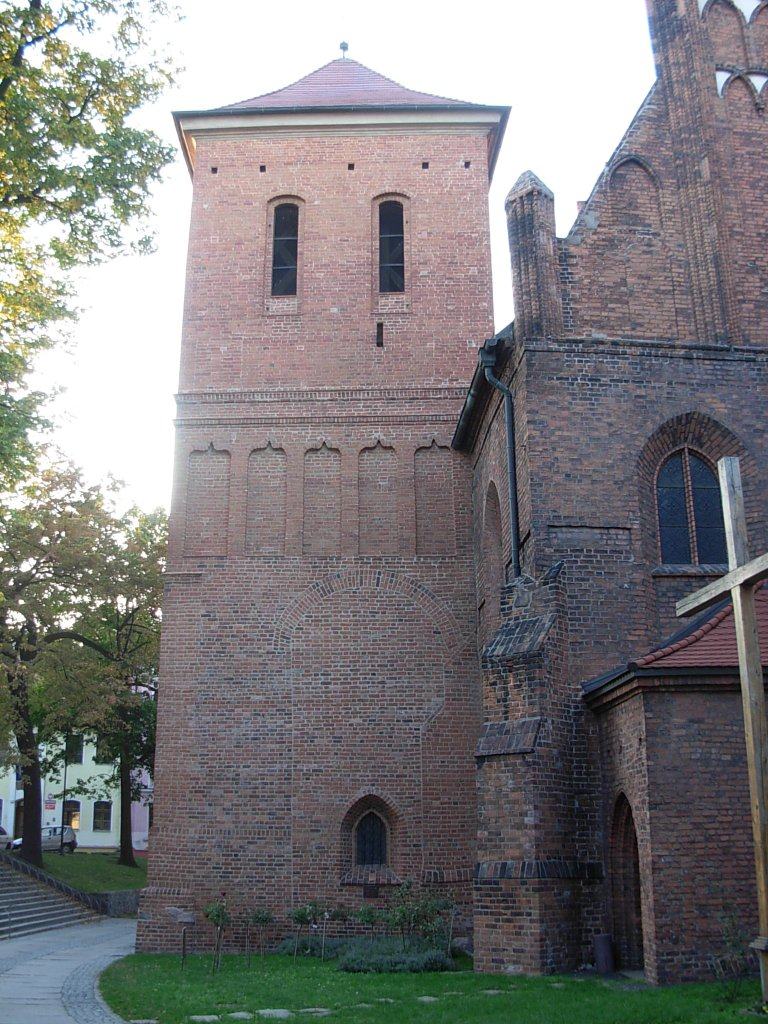
Belfry tower

In 1801, six bells were listed: the four upper mentioned, and two smaller ones in the sacristy and in the ridge turret. In 1838, a fifth bell was hung in the southern church belfry: Józef, 550 kilograms (1,210 lb), cast in 1720 in Hinrich Wredne's workshop, which had been operating till 1904. On its body, reliefs referred to the Virgin Mary, Saint Joseph and Jesus. In the turret on the top of the church were five small bells, some of which might have been hung by the Prussian authorities, seized from monastic and hospital churches in the vicinity. The main one was founded in 1702, in the bronze workshop of Absalom Wittwerck (1634–1716), with a diameter of 36 centimetres (14 in) and engravings (Glory to the only God). Others came from various origins, in 1559 and 1668.

In 1864 and 1865, bronze craftsman Fryderyk Schultz from Chełmno melted down several old bells and cast three new ones: Mikołaj 1,325 kilograms (2,921 lb), Maria 350 kilograms (770 lb), and Holy Spirit 190 kilograms (420 lb).

At the end of the 19th century, five bells were hung in the parish belfry: 1864-Mikołaj, the largest one, Józef (1720), Marcin (1652), Maria (1865) and Holy Spirit (1864). Eventually, at the beginning of the 20th century, thanks to the work of Ryszard Markwart, four large bells were still in the parish church, three of which had been founded in the last 50 years: Mikołaj in 1864 and smaller ones, Marcin and Maria, cast in 1904. These bells were seized by the Prussian authorities for war purposes and melted down at the end of World War I.

After the re-recreation of the Polish state in 1918, parish priest Tadeusz Skarbek-Malczewski started the process of getting new bells. Meanwhile, the Church of Our Lady of Loreto in Warsaw had its bells returned, after they had been seized by the USSR, as a consequence of the Peace of Riga (1921).

In 1922, Tadeusz Skarbek-Malczewski noticed that three of the bells returned to Warsaw belonged in fact to the Cathedral of Kamianets-Podilskyi in Ukraine: consequently, he championed the idea of getting these orphan bells to Bydgoszcz. Finally, in November 1923, those bells arrived in Bydgoszcz, one of them being handed over to Łabiszyn.

In 1929, four new additional bells were founded by bell caster Karol Szwabe from Biała: Wojciech, Marcin, Mikołaj and Annunciation of the Blessed Virgin Mary. These bells were confiscated during World War II and melted down by the Third Reich to support war effort.

In the end, only two bells survived the Second World War and are still preserved today in the belfry of the parish church:

1. A 1641-bell from Sts. Peter and Paul Cathedral of Kamianets-Podilskyi – 1 metre (3.3 ft) diameter, 1,138 kilograms (2,509 lb). Its reliefs indicate it was founded by Wojciech Wolskilnus and Canon Stanisław Rilski. This bell was immortalized in Henryk Sienkiewicz's novel Fire in the Steppe (Polish: Pan Wołodyjowski), for calling the alarm during the 1672 siege of Podolsky, and in an oath scene between hero Michał Wołodyjowski and his friend Kettling;
2. A 1737 bell from the Dominican church of Kamianets-Podilskyi. Its Dominican origins are engraved on its body.

== See also ==
- Bydgoszcz
- Roman Catholicism in Poland
- Mill Island in Bydgoszcz
- Grodzka Street in Bydgoszcz
- Jezuicka Street in Bydgoszcz
- Farna Street in Bydgoszcz

== Bibliography ==
- (in Polish) Błażejewski, Krzysztof (2007). Dzwon Wołodyjowskiego. Kalendarz Bydgoski. Bydgoszcz: Towarzystwo Miłośników Miasta Bydgoszczy.
- (in Polish) Borucki, Kazimierz (1972). Madonna z fary. Kalendarz Bydgoski. Bydgoszcz: Towarzystwo Miłośników Miasta Bydgoszczy. pp. 92–95.
- (in Polish) Chamot, Marek (2000). Kościół katolicki w Bydgoszczy w czasach zaborów. Kalendarz Bydgoski. Bydgoszcz: Towarzystwo Miłośników Miasta Bydgoszczy. pp. 105–109.
- (in Polish) Derenda, Jerzy (2006). Piękna stara Bydgoszcz, t. I z serii Bydgoszcz, miasto na Kujawach. Bydgoszcz: warzystwo Miłośników Miasta Bydgoszczy. ISBN 9788391617816.
- (in Polish) Kulpiński, Henryk (1982). Bydgoska fara. Kalendarz Bydgoski. Bydgoszcz: Towarzystwo Miłośników Miasta Bydgoszczy. pp. 92–95.
- (in Polish) Kutta, Janusz (1988). Rola kościoła katolickiego w dziejach Bydgoszczy. Kronika Bydgoska XIX. Bydgoszcz: Towarzystwo Miłosnikow Miasta Bydgoszczy - Bydgoskie Towarzystwo Naukowe. pp. 9–16.
- (in Polish) Łbik, Lech (2004). Fara – świadek historii miasta. Kalendarz Bydgoski. Bydgoszcz: Towarzystwo Miłośników Miasta Bydgoszczy.
- (in Polish) Łbik, Lech (1999). Narodziny bydgoskiej parafii, średniowieczne świątynie, parafialny laikat, dekanat. Kronika Bydgoska, tom specjalny wydany z okazji wizyty papieża Jana Pawła II w Bydgoszczy. Bydgoszcz: Towarzystwo Miłośników Miasta Bydgoszczy.
- (in Polish) Łbik, Lech (2002). Staropolskie dzieje bydgoskiej fary (XIV–XVIII wiek). Kronika Bydgoska XXIV. Bydgoszcz: Towarzystwo Miłośników Miasta Bydgoszczy. pp. 11–73.
- (in Polish) Łbik, Lech (1999). Recepcja kultu św. Mikołaja w Bydgoszczy na tle początków tamtejszej parafii farnej. Kronika Bydgoska, tom specjalny wydany z okazji wizyty papieża Jana Pawła II w Bydgoszczy. Bydgoszcz: Towarzystwo Miłośników Miasta Bydgoszczy.
- (in Polish) Markowski, Dariusz (2002). Gotycki obraz "Madonna z Różą" z kościoła konkatedralnego w Bydgoszczy – ikonografia, historia, technika. Toruń: Acta Universitatis Nicolai Copernici. Nauki Humanistyczno-Społeczne. Zabytkoznawstwo i Konserwatorstwo, z. 32 (344). pp. 67–108.
- (in Polish) Markowski, Dariusz (1996). Przyczynek do badań nad obrazem "Madonna z różą" z kościoła farnego w Bydgoszczy. Materiały do dziejów kultury i sztuki Bydgoszczy i regionu, z. 1. Bydgoszcz: Pracownia Dokumentacji i Popularyzacji Zabytków Wojewódzkiego Ośrodka Kultury w Bydgoszczy. pp. 44–51.
- (in Polish) Nowicki, Tomasz (2002). Wizytacja Fary bydgoskiej z 1745 roku jako przykład źródła do badań nad wyposażeniem kościoła. Kronika Bydgoska XXIV. Bydgoszcz: Towarzystwo Miłośników Miasta Bydgoszczy. pp. 74–83.
- (in Polish) Parucka, Krystyna (2008). Zabytki Bydgoszczy: minikatalog. Bydgoszcz: TIFEN" Krystyna Parucka. ISBN 9788392719106.
- (in Polish) Borucki, Kazimierz (2006). Rozkwit bydgoskiego kościoła. Kalendarz Bydgoski. Bydgoszcz: Towarzystwo Miłośników Miasta Bydgoszczy.
- (in Polish) Romaniuk, Marek (2002). Duchowieństwo parafii bydgoskiej w latach 1772–1920 – portret zbiorowy. Kronika Bydgoska XXIV. Bydgoszcz: Towarzystwo Miłośników Miasta Bydgoszczy. pp. 142–150.
- (in Polish) Wysocka, Agnieszka (1998). Witraże z prezbiterium kościoła farnego w Bydgoszczy. Materiały do dziejów kultury i sztuki Bydgoszczy i regionu, z. 3. Bydgoszcz: Pracownia Dokumentacji i Popularyzacji Zabytków Wojewódzkiego Ośrodka Kultury w Bydgoszczy. pp. 105–110.
- (in Polish) Zyglewski, Zbigniew (2002). Dzwony bydgoskiej fary. Kronika Bydgoska XXIV. Bydgoszcz: Towarzystwo Miłośników Miasta Bydgoszczy. pp. 127–141.
