= Church of Our Lady of Perpetual Help, Bydgoszcz =

Catholic Church in Kuyavian-Pomeranian, Poland

Coordinates: 53°06′57″N 17°59′39″E

Church of Our Lady of Perpetual Help in Bydgoszcz
- Polish: Kościół Matki Boskiej Nieustającej Pomocy w Bydgoszczy
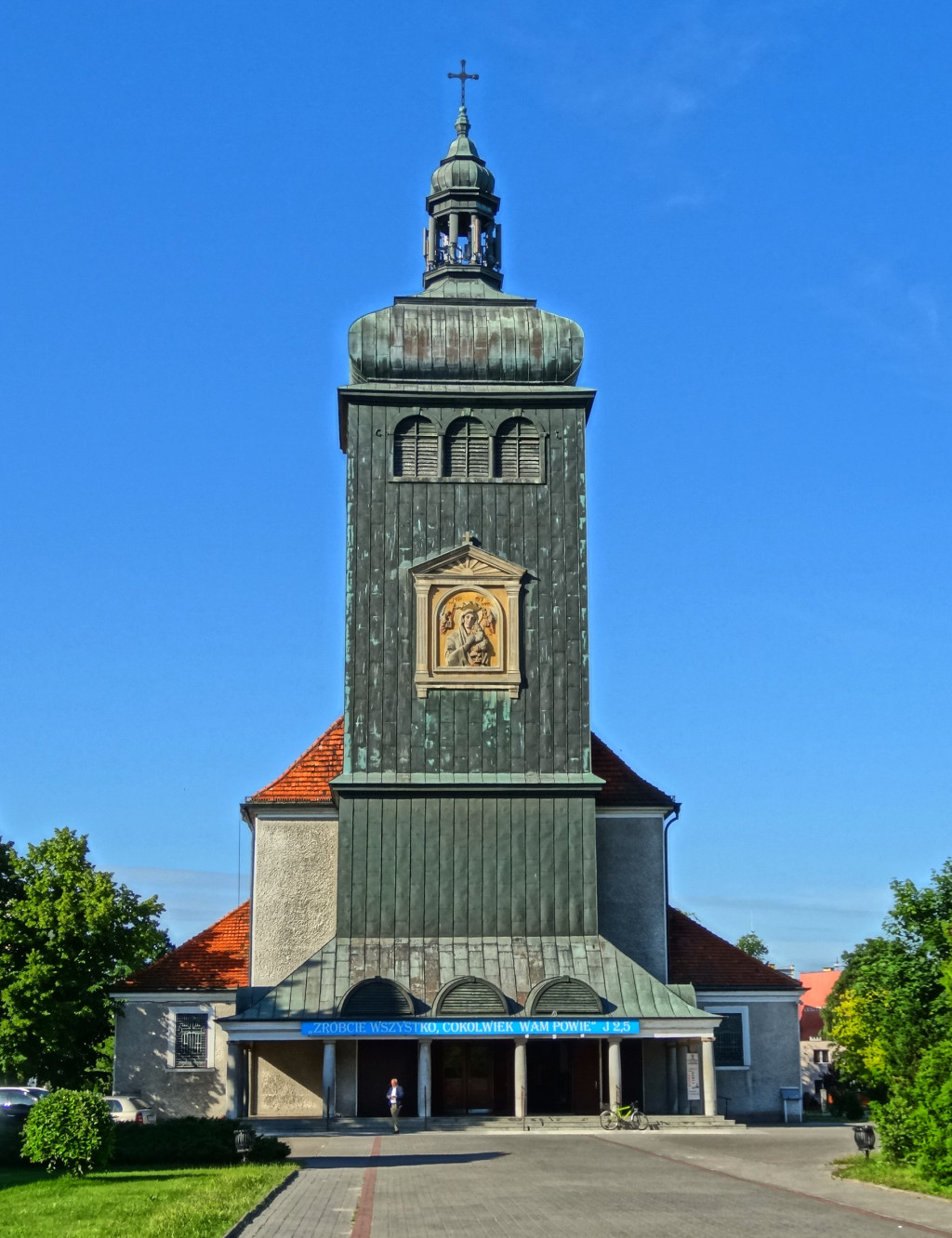
- Church of Our Lady of Perpetual Help, Bydgoszcz
- Church of Our Lady of Perpetual Help in Bydgoszcz
- Location: 16 Ugory street, Bydgoszcz
- Country: Poland
- Denomination: Catholic Church
- Website: http://www.ugory.bydgoszcz.pl/

History
- Status: Church
- Dedication: Christ the Savior
- Dedicated: October 28, 1928

Architecture
- Functional status: Active
- Heritage designation: Nr.601239, A/897 November 7, 2005.
- Architect: Stefan Cybichowski
- Architectural type: Polish national style
- Completed: 1926-1928

Specifications
- Materials: Brick

The Church of Our Lady of Perpetual Help is a wood and brick Catholic church, located on the southern heights of Bydgoszcz in northern Poland, at 16 Ugory street.

== History ==
=== Prussian period ===
The desire to erect a catholic church in Szwederowo district dates back to the end of the 19th century, as this village housed the main concentration of Polish Catholics in and around Bromberg. The Prussian authorities only authorized the construction of a Lutheran temple in 1906, the Martin Luther Church in Bydgoszcz, fearing that new catholic parishes fostered Polish identity and resistance movements. The latter temple was burned down in September 1939, and demolished in 1945, shortly after the end of WWII.

Edmund Dalbor, Primate of Poland, made up his mind in favor of the construction of a church in this suburb, after a visit to Bydgoszcz he made in 1917. To this purpose, he designated Jan Konopczyński, then vicar of St. Martin and St. Nicholas parish -only catholic parish, as responsible for the project, via the setting up of an association for the construction of churches in Bydgoszcz and the surroundings (Polish: Katolickie Stowarzyszenie Budowy Kościołów w Bydgoszczy i Okolicy). In August 1917, this association purchased plots of land in Father Ignacy Skorupki street (Nr.2/4 and 8/10) and asked local engineer Edmund Pitak to develop an initial design. However, the outbreak of World War I ground the scheme to a halt.

=== Projects and construction ===
The establishment of the Second Polish Republic in 1920 brought opportune conditions for the expected construction of the church: Szwederowo village had been integrated into Bydgoszcz city territory and Szwederowo parish of 6700 residents was one of the four newly created pastoral districts (St. Martin and St. Nicholas parish, Parish of the Holy Trinity, Parish of the Sacred Heart of Jesus and Szwederowo). At the beginning, the lack of a church led to celebrate Sundays and holidays services in the open, whereas weekdays masses were held in the soup kitchen establishment at 66 Orla street.

Father Konopczyński proposed the Metropolitan Curia in Gniezno two choices: either building a temporary church at the plot at the intersection of Orla and Skorupkiego streets or acquiring from the city the former Conitzer dance hall at 2 Dąbrowskiego street and adapt it to a makeshift church. The latter solution was chosen and the temporary temple was set up with the help of parishioners, comprising a main altar adorned with a painting of Our Lady of Perpetual Help which came from downtown's St. Martin and St. Nicholas parish. This make-do church was consecrated on October 10, 1920. From this time on, many individuals, craftsmen and merchants made donations, offered paintings or craft works to the church-to-be.

In 1923, Bydgoszcz city council transferred the land at Orla and Dąbrowskiego streets for private construction, in exchange of which it passed a resolution giving perpetua lease for a plot where to build a church. Meanwhile, on April 10, 1924, cardinal Edmund Dalbor erected officially the Szwederowo's parish of Our Lady of Perpetual Help. Finally in January 1926, Father Konopczyński acquired, on behalf of the Metropolitan Curia, a property at 8/9 Ugory street (present day 16 Ugory street) for the construction of the parish church.

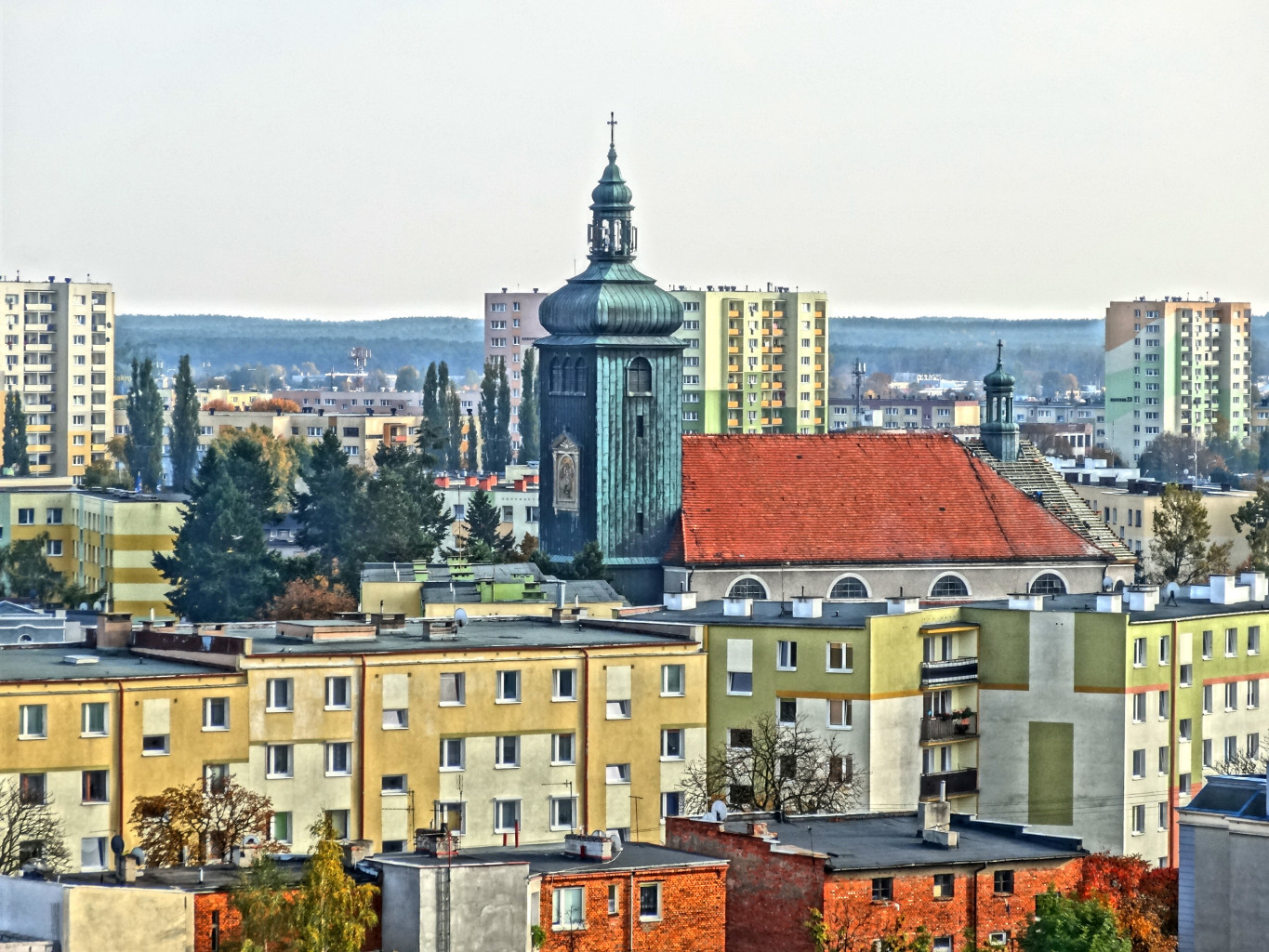
The church in the town

Originally, timber framing technique was supposed to be used, but following Poznań architect Stefan Cybichowski's advice, it was decided to build a reinforced concrete nave and enlarge the church by one span. Design was completed in May 1926, and construction works began in October. Thanks to a daily voluntary help of 150 districts inhabitants, the walls, roof and tower were finished in 1927. During the whole period of the construction, it has been a constant struggle to finance the project. Many times in 1927, the local press informed about the issue and the local newspaper Dziennik Bydgoski never ceased campaigning for the completion of the church, regularly calling for donations. Szweredowo residents organized performances, church fraternities and associations from all over Poland joined the movement, such as the Conference of the Ladies of Mercy of Saint Vincent de Paul (Polish: Konferencja Pań Miłosierdzia św. Wincentego ci Paulo), the Brotherhood of Christian Mothers (Polish: Bractwo Matek Chrześcijańskich) or the Catholic Society of Polish Workers (Polish: Katolickie Towarzystwo Robotników Polskich). Youth from local junior high schools also joined the campaign, the city of Bydgoszcz funded through loans the furnishing of the interiors. Other loans contracted in 1926-1927 and fundraising in neighboring voivodeships contributed as well to the construction of the church. In the end, even the supply of building materials at minute prices, let alone free handed, participated to the success of the project: 10,000 bricks donated by an individual from Potulice, half-price supply of timber, gravel handed over for free to the local brick factory. However, due to the lack of funds, the original architectural plans were not fully implemented, especially for the interiors. A new presbytery was erected according to Stefan Cybichowski's design, which enabled the sale of the ancient one at 4/5 Skorupkiego street to the city authorities. The embellishment and furnishing of the church lasted a decade more (1937).

The building site was visited by cardinal August Hlond (March 7, 1927) and by bishop Antoni Laubitz (May 19, 1928) who also financially supported the construction. Warsaw's Metropolitan Curia offered in 1927, a 14th-century church bell, Saint John the Apostle (approx. 300 kg), which had been recovered from a non-extant church in the Eastern Borderlands. A second bell, Our Lady of Perpetual Help (approx. 500 kg), was cast from a purchased 17th century one, coming from a steeple in Pustelnik.

=== After church consecration ===
The consecration of the church happened on October 28, 1928, and its vicar was solemnly designated on February 23, 1930. In 1933, most of the neo-baroque interior elements were installed, the main altar was completed in 1937. At this time, Stefan Cybichowski was working on the project of the church of Saint Anthony of Padua (Polish: Kościół św. Antoniego Padewskiego), located at the crossing of Grunwaldzka and Koronowska streets. During the years prior to WWII, the local community fervour built up its spiritual coherence: between 1924 and 1939, 19 catholic fraternities and associations were founded in the parish.

During Nazi occupation the church was still active, but Polish language was banned both during services and private exchanges. Despite those threats, priests in the parish often used Polish for confessions or while preparing children for their First Communion. At that time, the presbytery was operating as a contact cell for Home Army (Polish: Armia Krajowa, AK) and as a small scale clandestine seminary. The war caused considerable damage to the church: a majority of the nave was torn down and 60% of the roof was destroyed.

Among the Polish victims of the sundry roundups and searches performed from September 5 to 30, about 300 residents of Szwederowo are recorded. On the churchyard of Our Lady of Perpetual Help at Ugory street lays a mass grave of 21 murdered Poles detained while leaving the church after a service on Sunday, September 10, 1939. Jan Konopczyński was arrested by the Gestapo in the fall of 1939, but after a few months he was released from prison and survived occupation. He was nominated to take the parish of the Sacred Heart of Jesus on September 15, 1945.

Renovation works started in 1946, privately financed by Bydgoszcz citizens; interior refurbishing was led by plastic artist Władysław Pacholski. The newly renovated church was consecrated on June 29, 1947, by Lucjan Bernacki, auxiliary bishop of Gniezno.

In the following years, many overhaul actions or ornamenting projects have been carried out, among others:

- Set up of stained glass designed by artist Edward Kwiatkowski from Toruń, commemorating the murder on September 10, 1939, of Szwederowo residents in the church cemetery (1947);
- Installation of a new bell, Saint Wojciech (approx. 750 kg), to replace those taken by Nazi forces (1947);
- New organs, coming from a lutheran temple in Mąkowarsko (1948);

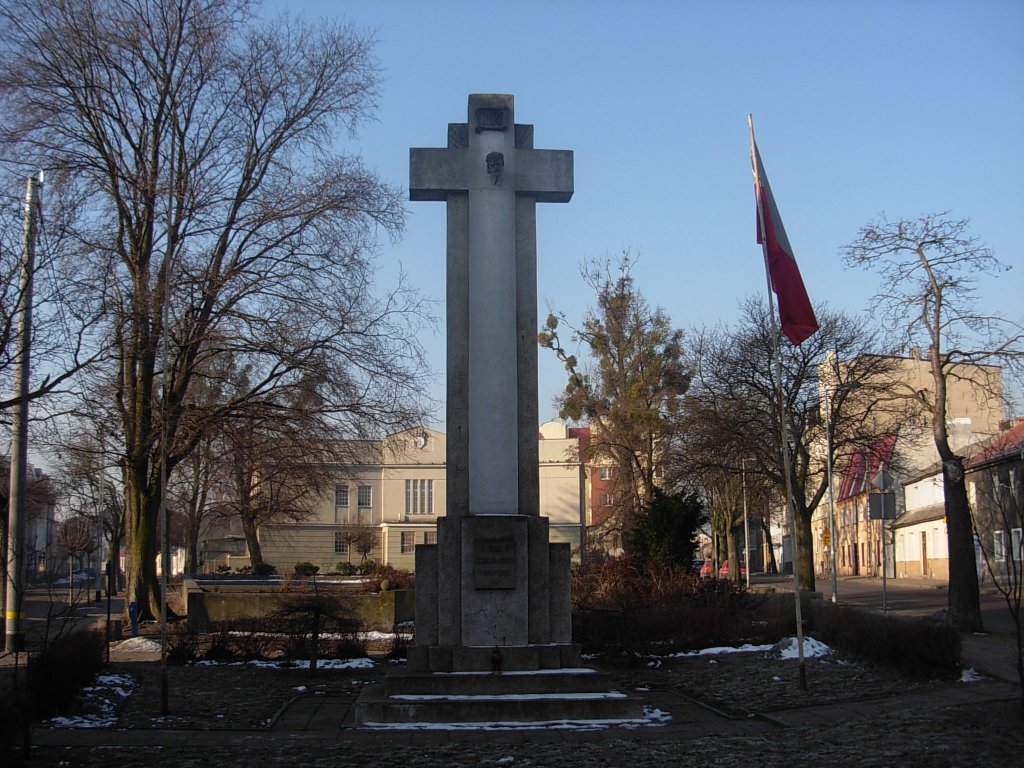
Rebuilt Cross of the Jubilee

- New mission cross erected, restoring the original one from 1937 destroyed by the Germans (1949);
- Renovation works, albeit not authorized by political authorities, in the sacristy, boiler room and pulpit. Set up of a new Baptismal font, an additional stained glass by Kwiatkowski and a painting of Jude the Apostle (1952-1956);
- Roof renovation (1969-1970);
- Building of a catechesis house (1975);
- Lay down of a marble floor (1981-1982);
- Reconstruction of the 1935 Commemorative Cross of the Jubilee, 50 years after its destruction by Nazis. It stands at the crossing of Orla and Ignacego Skorupki streets (1992).

== Architecture ==
The church displays a national style, fashionable in Poland in the 1920s: a historicist platform combined with folk elements and a mix of neo-renaissance and neo-baroque influences.

=== Exteriors ===
The edifice comprises three naves and a closed pentagonal chancel, facing south, with a massive tower on its front. As such, its design mirrors another contemporaneous religious building in Bydgoszcz, the church of Saint and Martyr Stanislaus of Szczepanów located at 1 Kapliczna street. Although the use of reinforced concrete allowed an extension of the nave length, the amount of external lining made of timber framing could not comply with the fire regulations of the time and as a consequence, the body of the building had to be plastered and the tower clad with copper sheets.

The external appearance of the church is reminiscent of folk architecture, in particular the flattened onion dome steeple overhanging the main entrance columned portico. A second portico has been added after WWII at the western side entrance. A ridge turret with the same onion dome style stands on top of the chancel.

==== Picture of Our Lady of Perpetual Help ====
The image of Our Lady of Perpetual Help has been sculpted and painted on a square board, 54 centimetres (21 in) x 41.5 centimetres (16.3 in), and placed on the steeple, welcoming the believers. It is a reminder of the icon that stands overhead the main altar.

The icon portrays the following holy figures: the Virgin Mary, Jesus as infant and archangels Michael and Gabriel. They are associated with Greek letters inscribed in the backdrop of the board:

- ΜΡ - ΘΥ, for Mother of God, (Greek: Μήτηρ του Θεού);
- ΙϹ - ΧϹ, for Jesus Christ, first and last letters of each Greek word for Jesus Christ (ΙΗϹΟΥϹ ΧΡΙϹΤΟϹ or Greek: Iησοῦς Χριστός);
- ΟΑΜ for archangel Michael (Greek: O Ἀρχάγγελος Μιχαήλ);
- ΟΑΓ for archangel Gabriel (Greek: O Ἀρχάγγελος Γαβριήλ, ΟΑΓ).

Colors have died out a bit, but a one can notice on Mary's figure:

- a navy blue mantle, worn by mothers in Palestine;
- a red tunic, symbolizing in Byzantine iconography the color of the empress;
- a blue headdress covering her hair and forehead.

The gold ground represents heaven.

Baby Jesus, crowned as his mother, has his right sandal undone and falling, leaving one foot naked: it figures that although a God, he is also a man.

Both angels bear the tools of Christ's crucifixion: the cross for Gabriel, the reed, the sponge and the spear for Michael.

=== Interior ===
Interiors have a neo-baroque twist. Naves are separated by stuccoed arcades, embellished with Rococo ornamented cartouches. The three naves, the chancel and the three apses boast barrel vaults and lunettes. The chancel is enclosed with six monumental Ionic style capital columns. Columns also support an triforium gallery standing above the main entrance.

Large polychromes have been realized by the artist Leon Drapiewski, from Poznań. Overhead the main altar stands on the wall a painting of Our Lady of Perpetual Help, made in the 1930s in Bavaria. A sculpted version is placed high on the main steeple to remind parishioners.

== Gallery ==
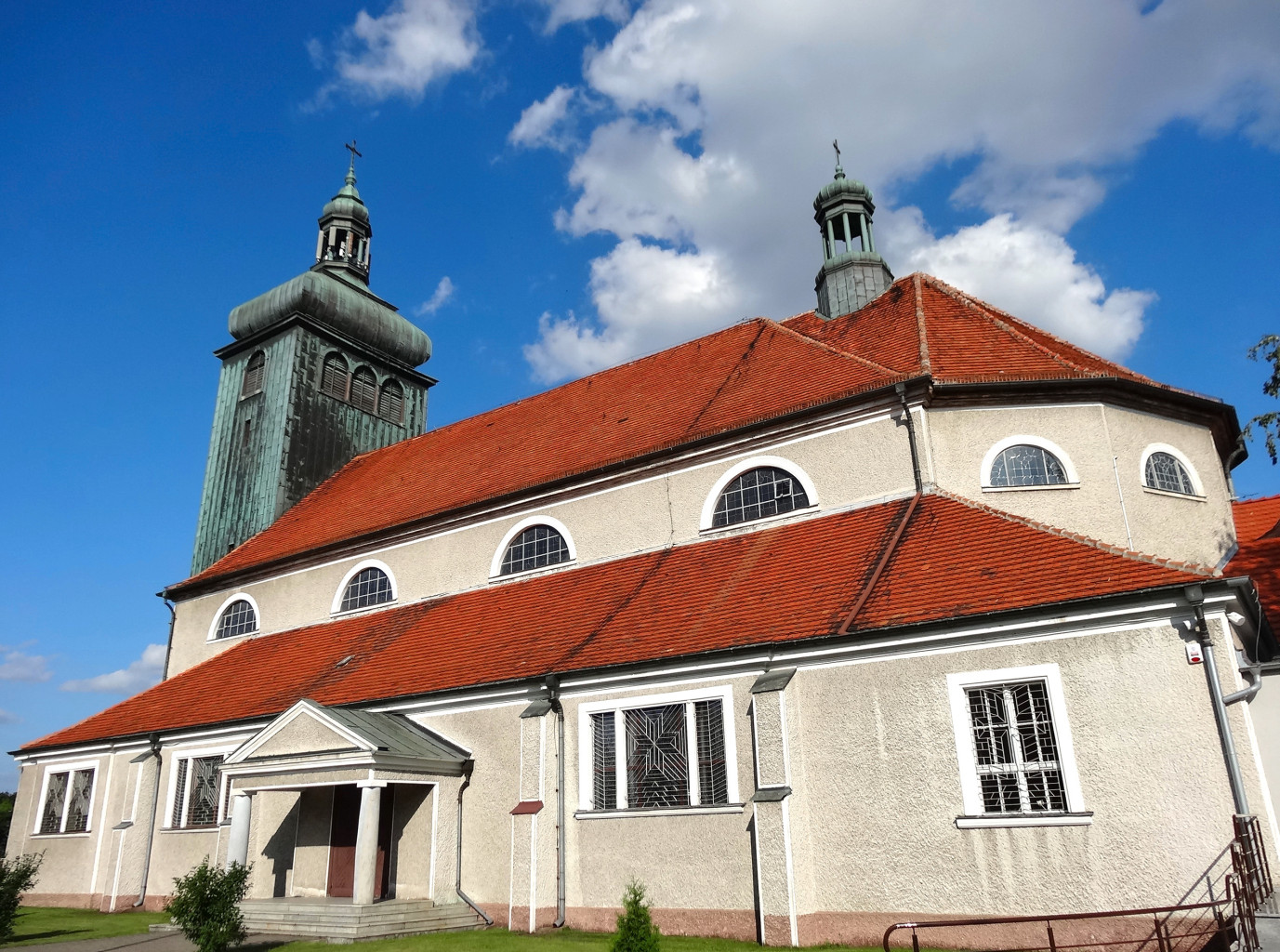
[Western facade

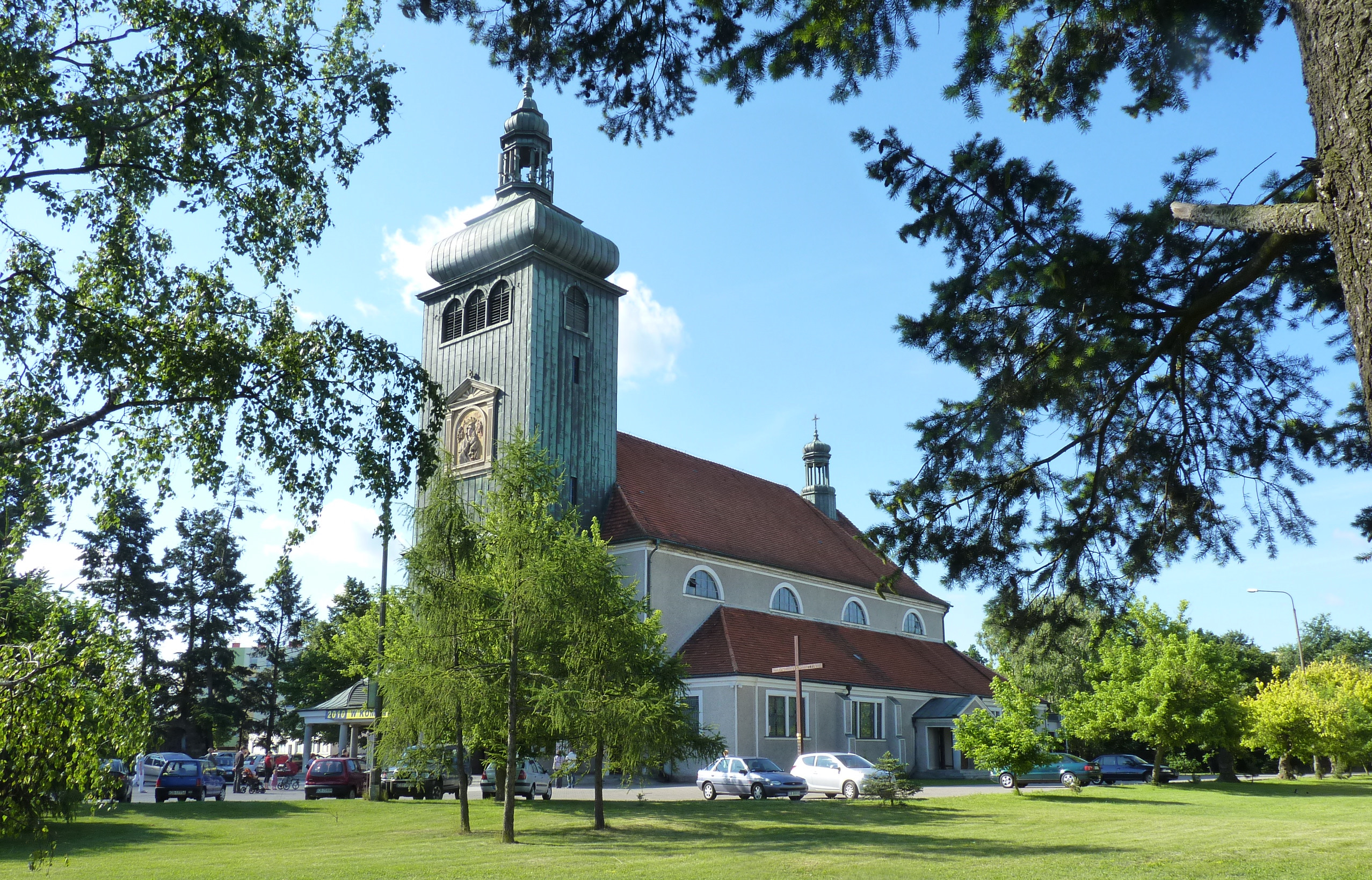
View from the quare

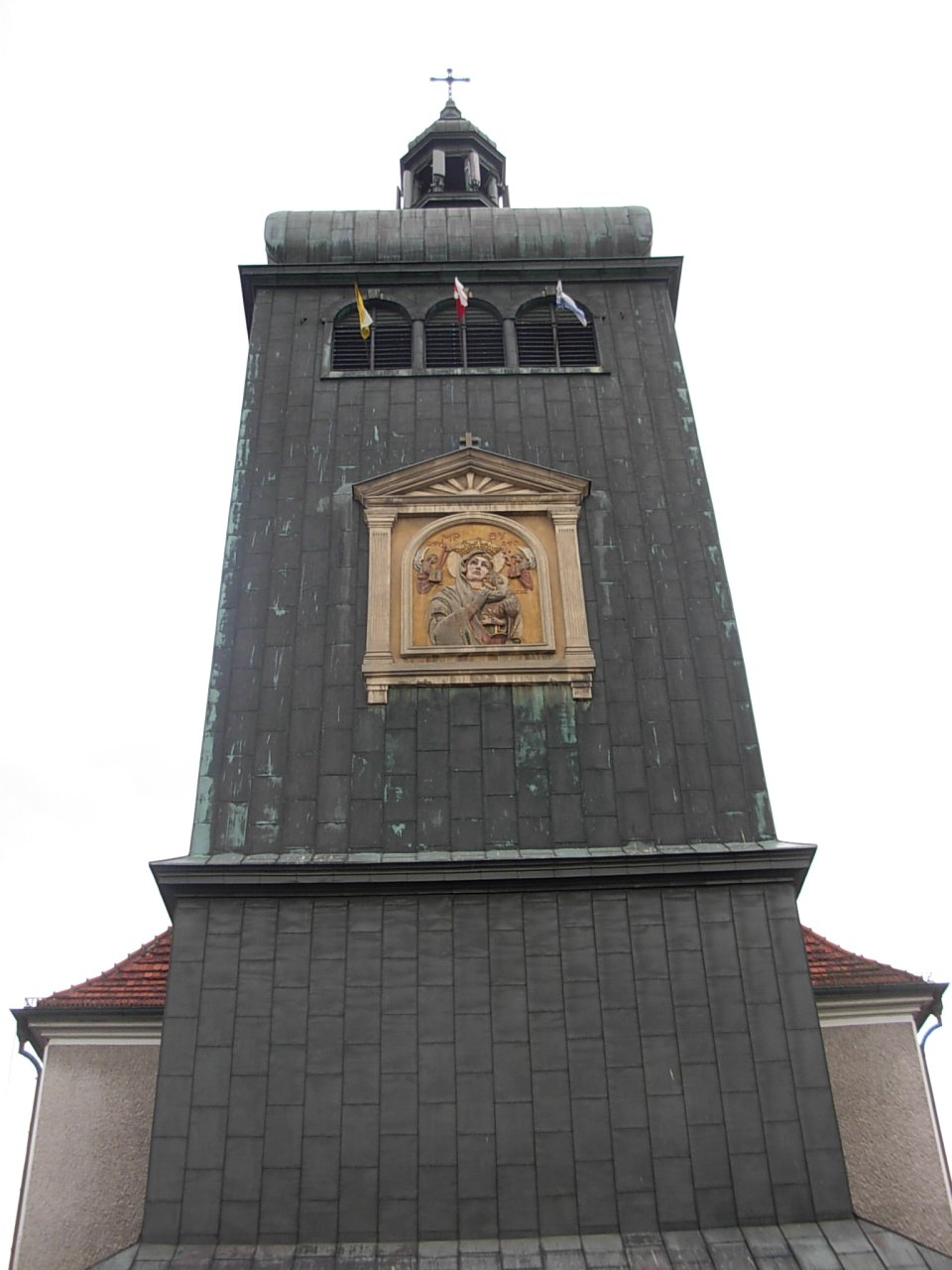
Steeple

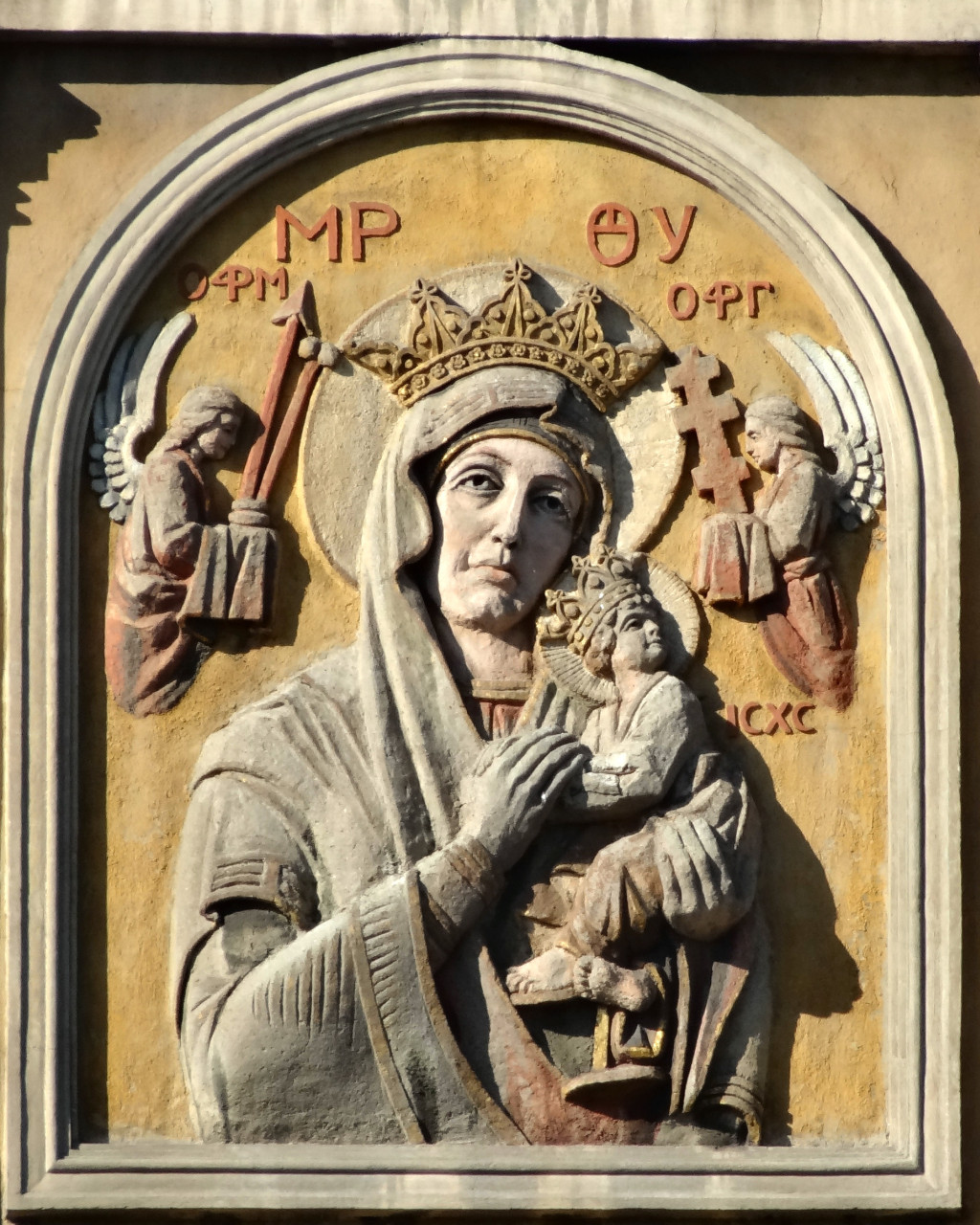
Sculpted icon on the main tower

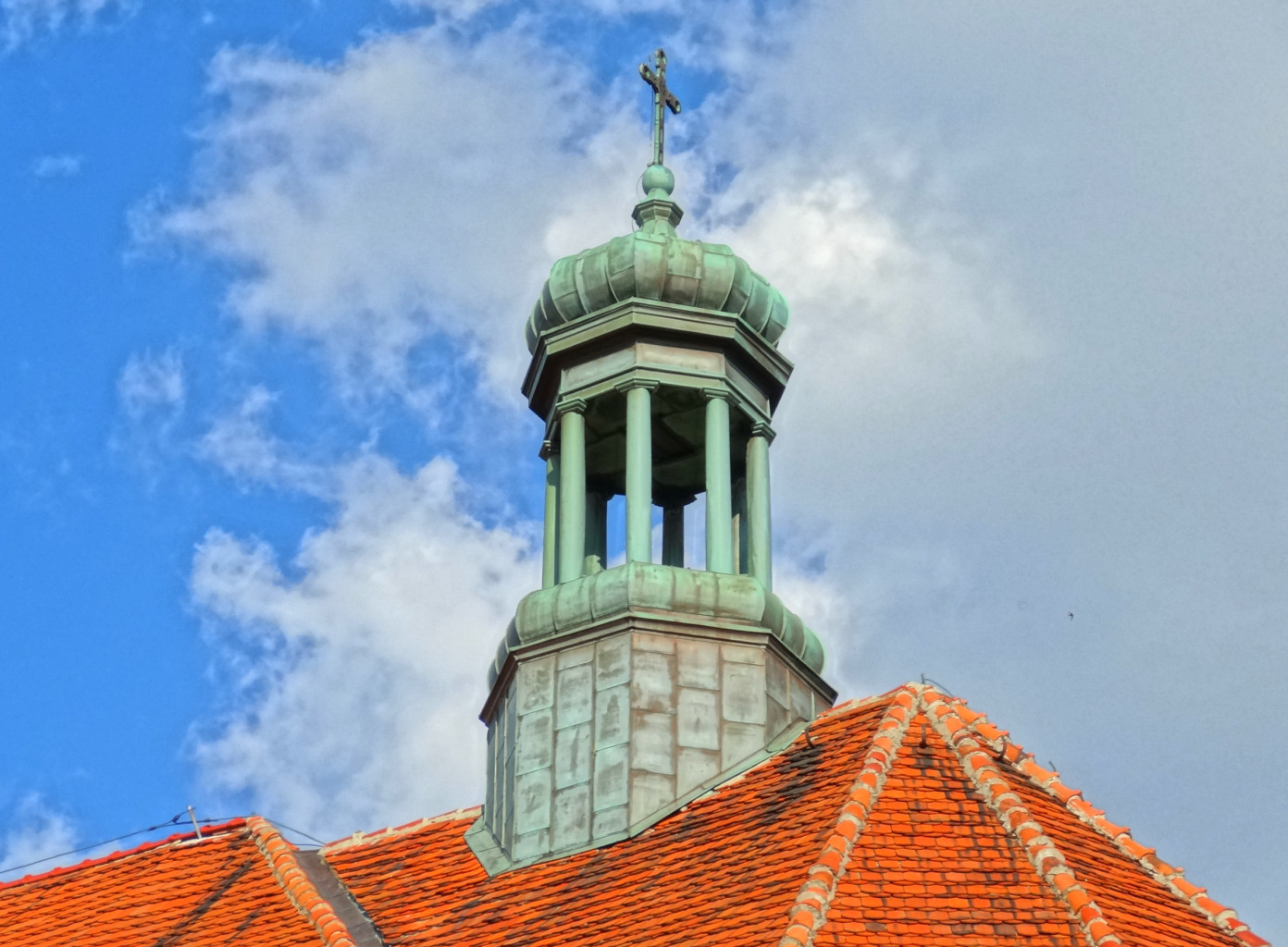
Ridge turret

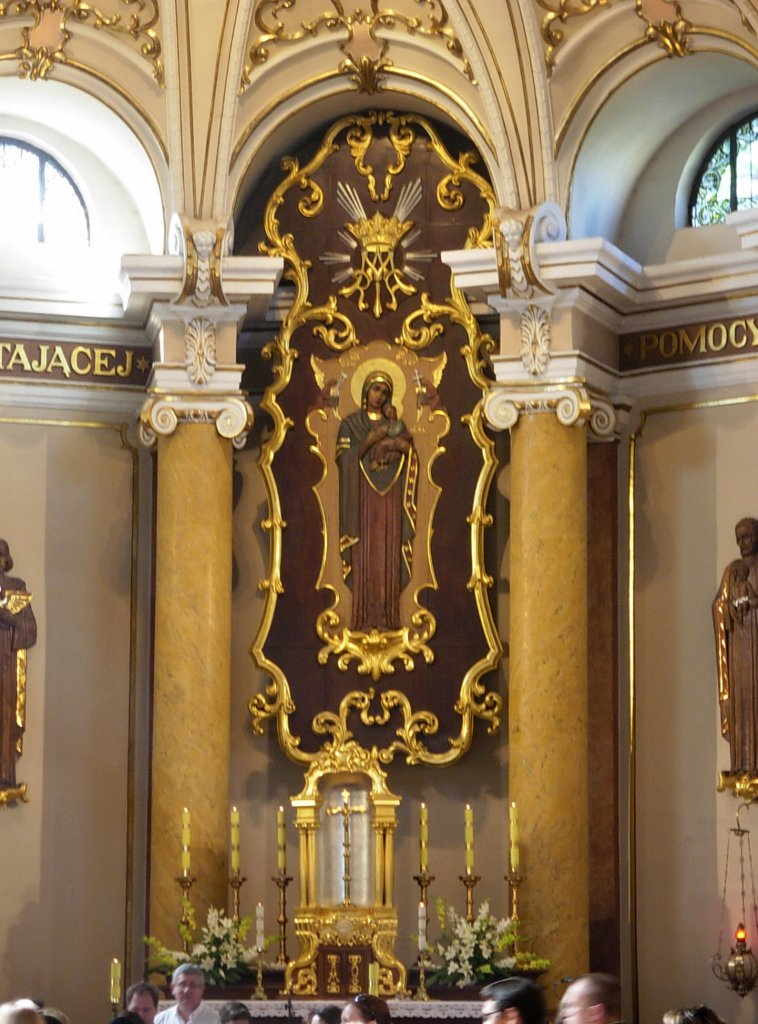
Icon of Our Lady of Perpetual Help

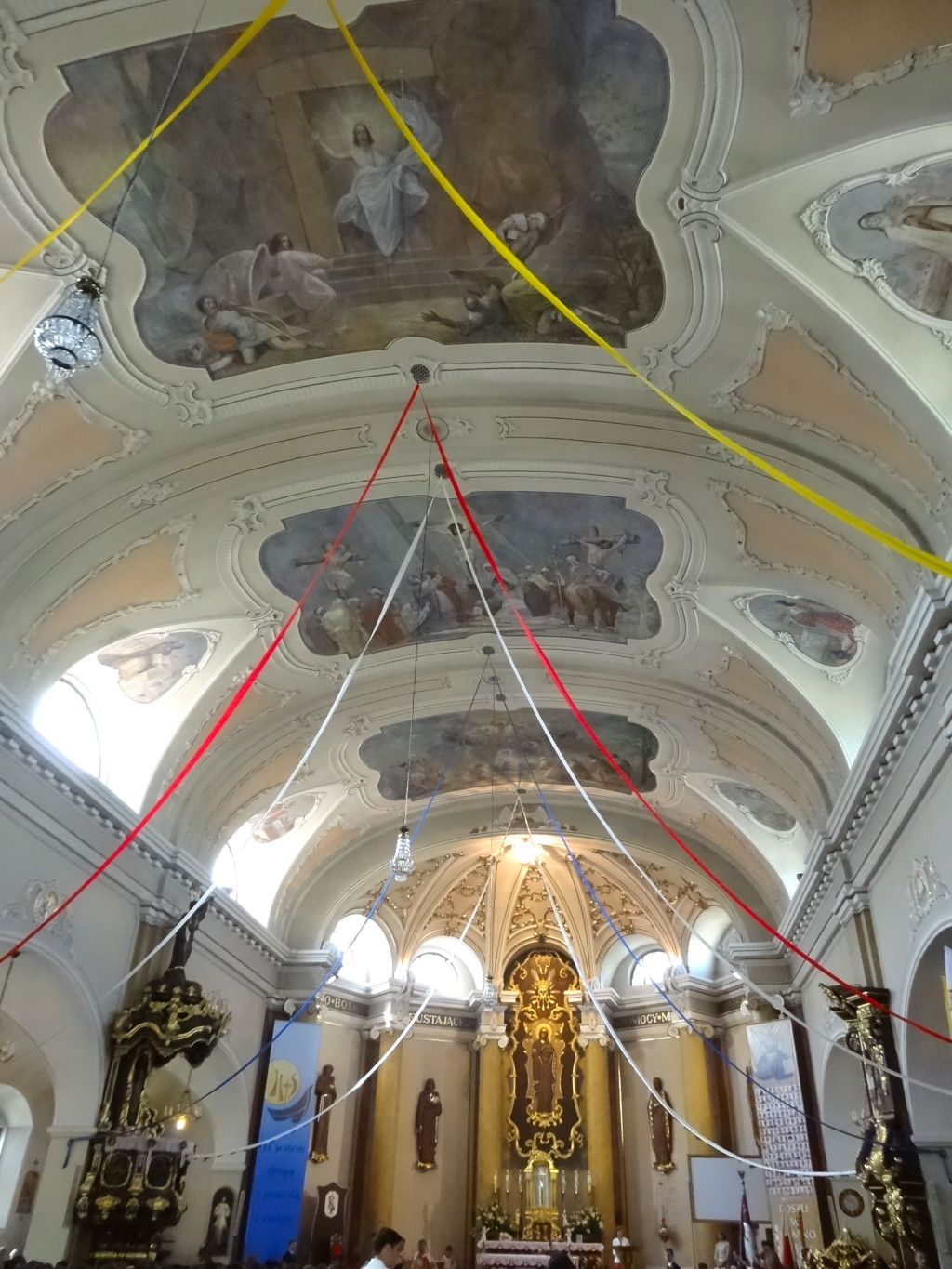
Vaulted roof

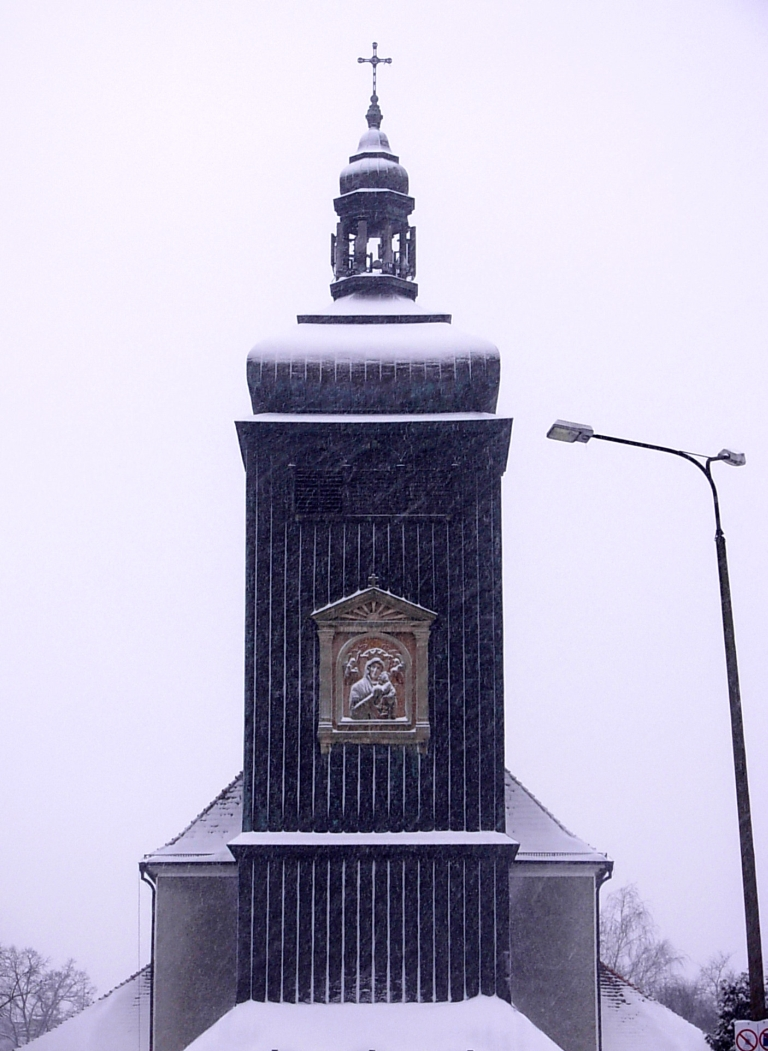
The church in winter

== See also ==
- Bydgoszcz
- Our Lady of Perpetual Help

== Bibliography ==
- Kuberska, Inga (1998). Architektura sakralna Bydgoszczy w okresie historyzmu. Materiały do dziejów kultury i sztuki Bydgoszczy i regionu. Zeszyt 3 (in Polish). Bydgoszcz: Pracownia dokumentacji i popularyzacji zabytków wojewódzkiego ośrodka kultury w Bydgoszczy.
- Parucka, Krystyna (2008). Zabytki Bydgoszczy – minikatalog (in Polish). Bydgoszcz: „Tifen” Krystyna Parucka.
- Rogalski, Bogumił (1991). Architektura sakralna Bydgoszczy dawniej i dziś. Kronika Bydgoska XII (in Polish). Bydgoszcz: Towarzystwo Miłosnikow Miasta Bydgoszczy - Bydgoskie Towarzystwo Naukowe. pp. 51–77.
- Derenda, Jerzy (2006). Piękna stara Bydgoszcz – tom I z serii Bydgoszcz miasto na Kujawach. Praca zbiorowa (in Polish). Bydgoszcz: Towarzystwo Miłośników Miasta Bydgoszczy.
- Umiński, Janusz (1999). Parafia pw. Matki Boskiej Nieustającej Pomocy (1920-1998). Kalendarz Bydgoski (in Polish). Bydgoszcz: Towarzystwo Miłośników Miasta Bydgoszczy.
