= Mąkowarsko =

- Village
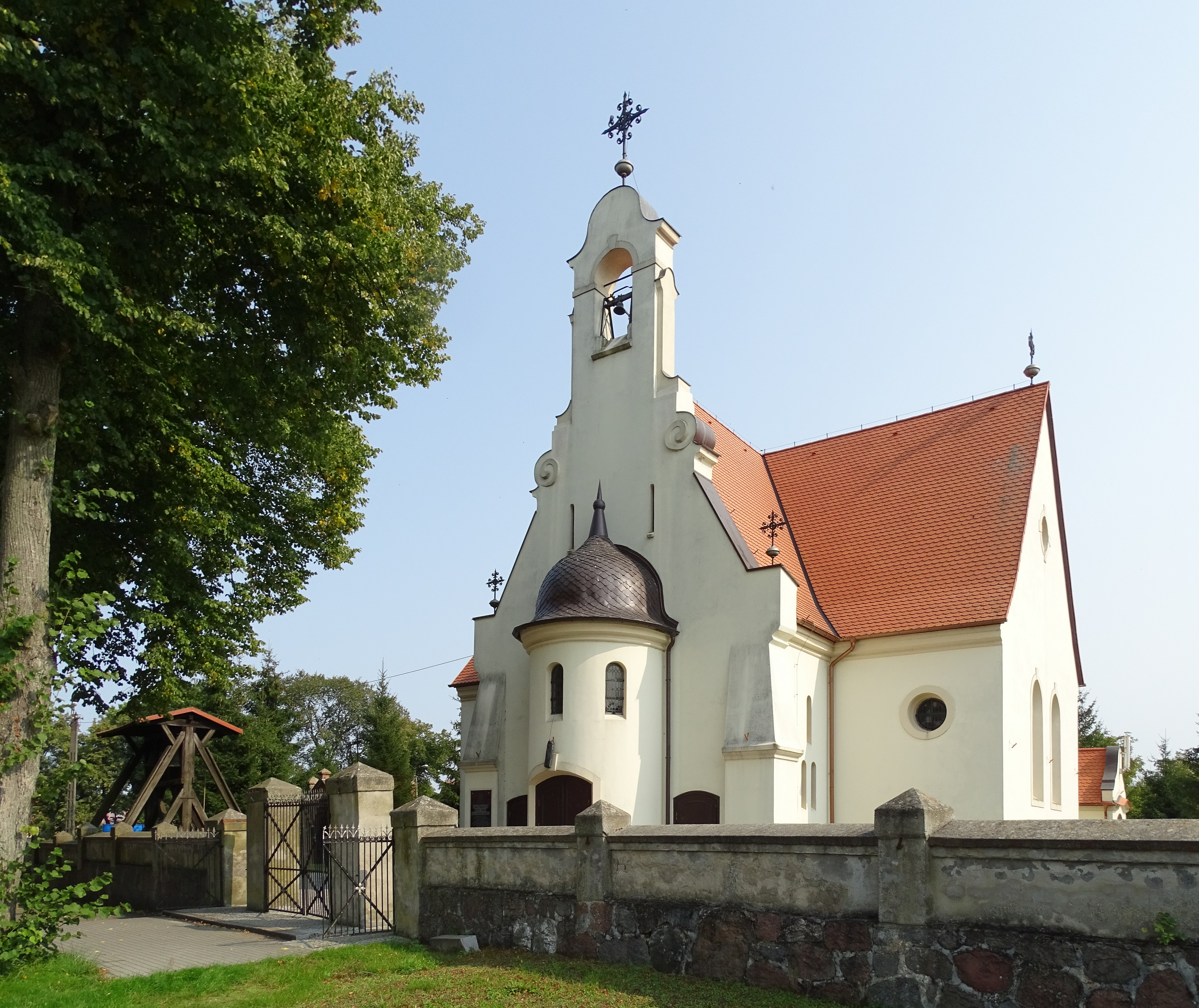
- Saint Lawrence church in Mąkowarsko

- Location within Poland
- Coordinates: 53°24′23″N 17°48′42″E
- Country: Poland
- Voivodeship: Kuyavian-Pomeranian
- County: Bydgoszcz
- Gmina: Koronowo

Population
  - Total: 1,300
- Time zone: UTC+1 (CET)
  - Summer (DST): UTC+2 (CEST)
- Vehicle registration: CBY

Mąkowarsko [mɔŋkɔˈvarskɔ] is a village in the administrative district of Gmina Koronowo, within Bydgoszcz County, Kuyavian-Pomeranian Voivodeship, in north-central Poland.

== History ==
During the German occupation of Poland (World War II), in 1941, the occupiers carried out expulsions of Poles, who were deported to the Potulice concentration camp, while their farms were then handed over to German colonists as part of the Lebensraum policy. Four Polish citizens were murdered by Nazi Germany in the village during the war.
