= Farna Street, Bydgoszcz =

Street in Bydgoszcz, Poland

Coordinates: 53°07′21″N 17°59′56″E

Farna Street
Bydgoszcz
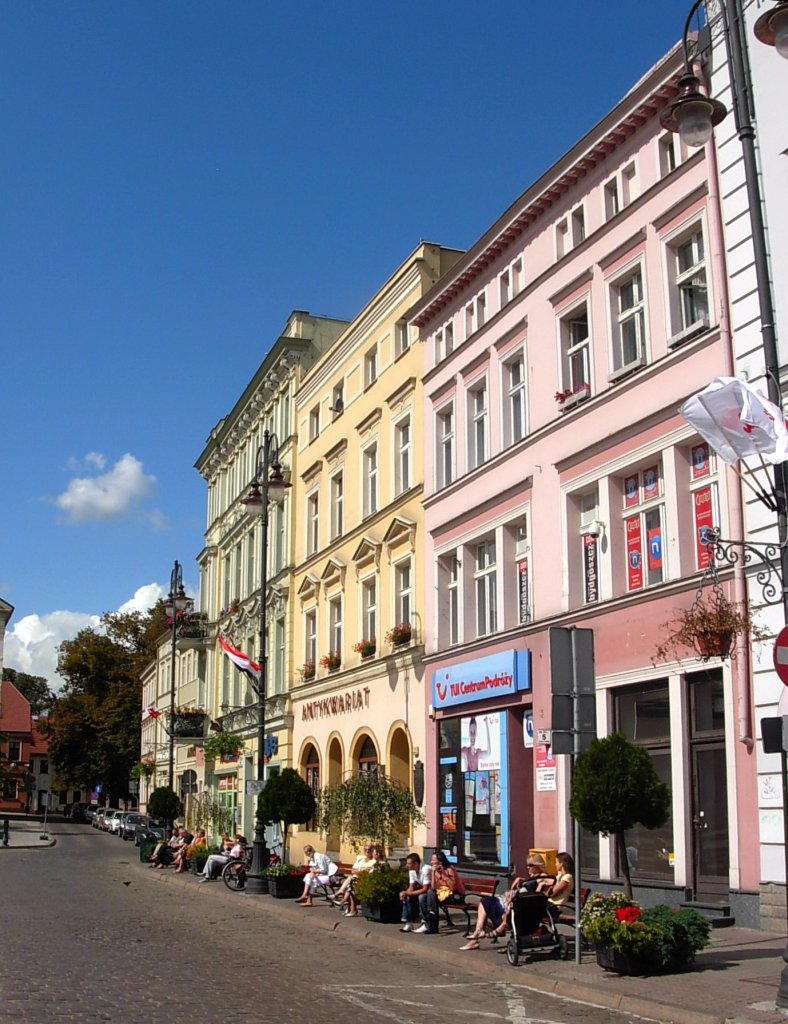
- Frontages from the Old Market Place

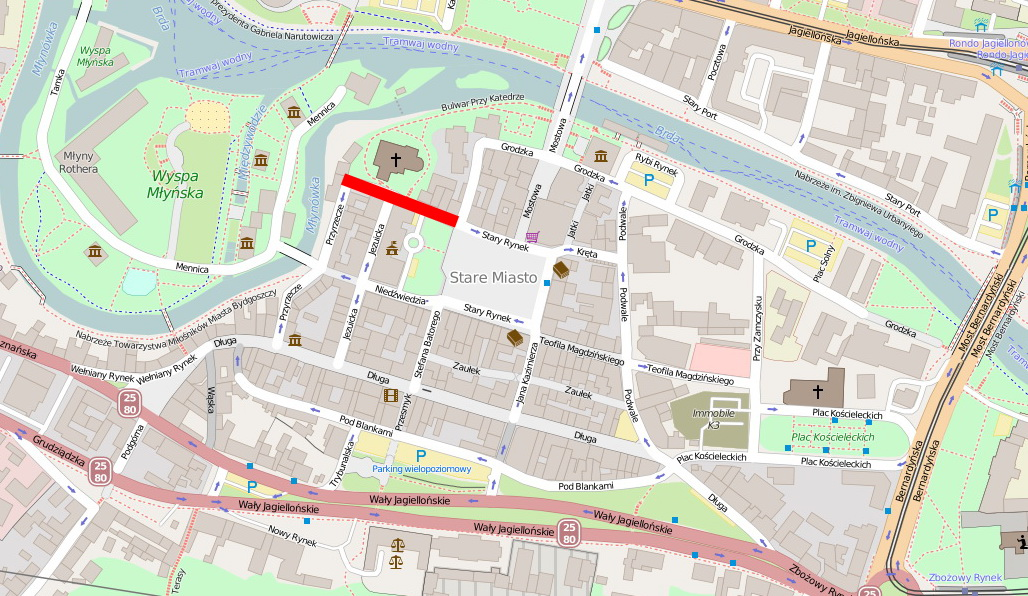
- Location of the street in Bydgoszcz
- Native name: Ulica Farna w Bydgoszczy (Polish)
- Former name: Pfarrstraße
- Part of: Bydgoszcz
- Owner: City of Bydgoszcz
- Length: 110 m (360 ft)
- Area: Old Town
- Location: Bydgoszcz, Poland

Farna Street is a street located in Bydgoszcz, Poland. Many of its buildings are either registered on Kuyavian-Pomeranian Voivodeship heritage list, or part of Bydgoszcz local history.

== Location ==
The street is located in the north-western part Bydgoszcz Old Town. It runs roughly along an east–west axis, connecting the Old Market square (Polish: Stary Rynek) to Przyrzecze Street near Mill Island. It is about 110 m long.

== History ==
Farna Street was laid out in the middle of the 14th century, during the formation of Bydgoszcz Old Town. It connected the north-western corner of the Old Market Square to the parish church (Polish: Kościół farny) and to the streets: Jezuicka and Przyrzecze.

The current architecture of the church dates back to the 15th century. In the vicinity of the edifice a cemetery had been standing until 1809, which gate and fences gave stood Farna Street.

The history of this part of the city is related to the Order of the Jesuits, which owned a majority of the dwellings located between today's Farna, Jezuicka, Niedźwiedzia streets and the Old Market Square. In 1619, the Society of Jesus erected a monastery here and around 1640, the construction of two Jesuit buildings on the Market Square closed one side of this quadrangle area:

- St Ignatius of Loyola Church (Polish: Kościół pojezuicki pw. św. Ignacego Loyoli);
- Jesuit College (Polish: Kolegium Jezuitów w Bydgoszczy).

During the Swedish Invasions (1660), most of the buildings were burned down, and many others were emptied by their inhabitants before the plague. Properties were then managed by churches, monasteries and hospitals: they were then called tagged as Jesuit.

The structure of the street did not change through time, until the outbreak of the Second World War and the Occupation of Bydgoszcz by Nazi forces. In 1940, Werner Kampe, NSDAP Kreisleiter in the city, ordered the following buildings to be razed:

- the western frontage of the Old Market square;
- St Ignatius of Loyola Church;
- the tenement house at the corner of the Old Market and Farna Street, which had been housing the Municipal Museum.

Nazi authorities had planned to construct a new city hall, but never completed it. Since that time, Farna street never had houses on its southern frontage, the northern side (even numbers) being visible directly from the Old Market square, as it is today.

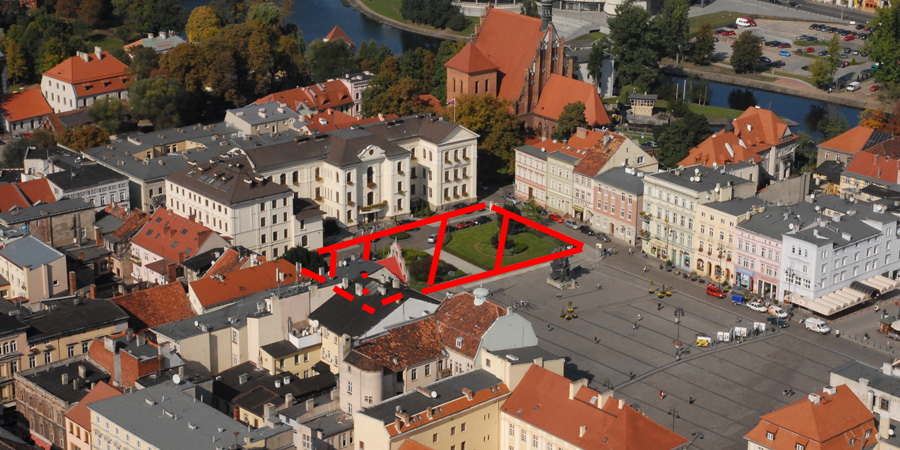
Highlighted area shows buildings demolished in 1940

In the 1970s, Polish authorities started to revitalize fragments of the Old Town, including Farna Street.

Final modernization of the street (pavement) was included in the Revitalization Plan of Bydgoszcz.

=== Naming ===
Through history, the street bore the following names:

- 16th century - 1st half of 18th century, Platea parochialis (Latin: Parish street)
- 1750–1816, Pfarrstraße (German: Parish street)
- 1820–1920, Alte Pfarrstraße (German: Old Parish street)
- 1920–1939, Ulica Farna (Polish: Parish street)
- 1939–1945 - Alte Pfarrstraße
- Since 1945, Ulica Farna

The street name refers to St. Martin and St. Nicholas Cathedral located at Nr.10.

== Main places and buildings ==
House at 2

1775-1776

Eclecticism

Earliest registered reference tells that in 1855, landlord of then Alte ßfarrstraße 7was August Berndt, a rentier living in Wilhelm Straße (today's Jagiellońska street). In the 1930s, it belonged to the Jesuit church of Bydgoszcz. Today, the tenement house belongs to Bydgoszcz parish church. This frontage was facing another one (bearing odd numbers) before the destruction of 1940.

The facade, although influenced by neoclassical architecture, displays a nice frieze with stuccoed vegetal motifs. In addition, one can highlight the superb decoration of the main entrance portal, with stuccoes, festoons and a niche overlooking the street.

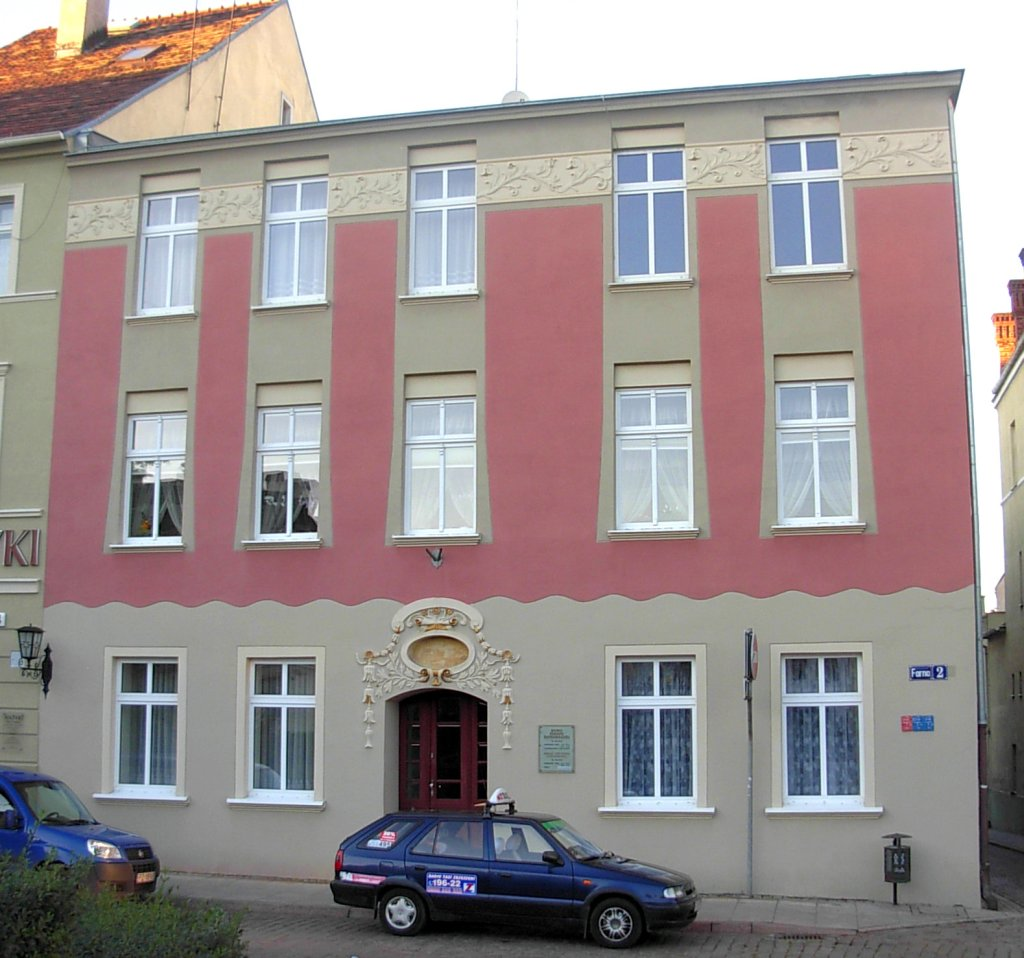
View from the Old Market Square

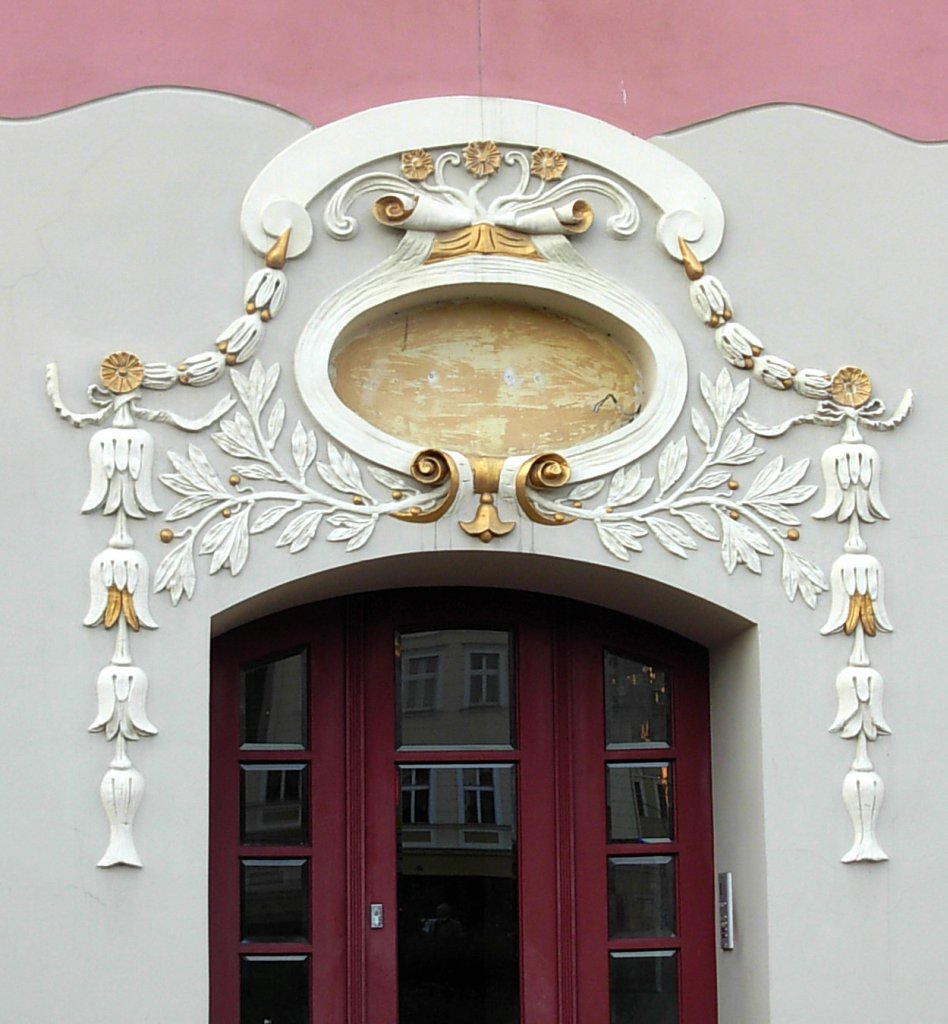
Adorned portal

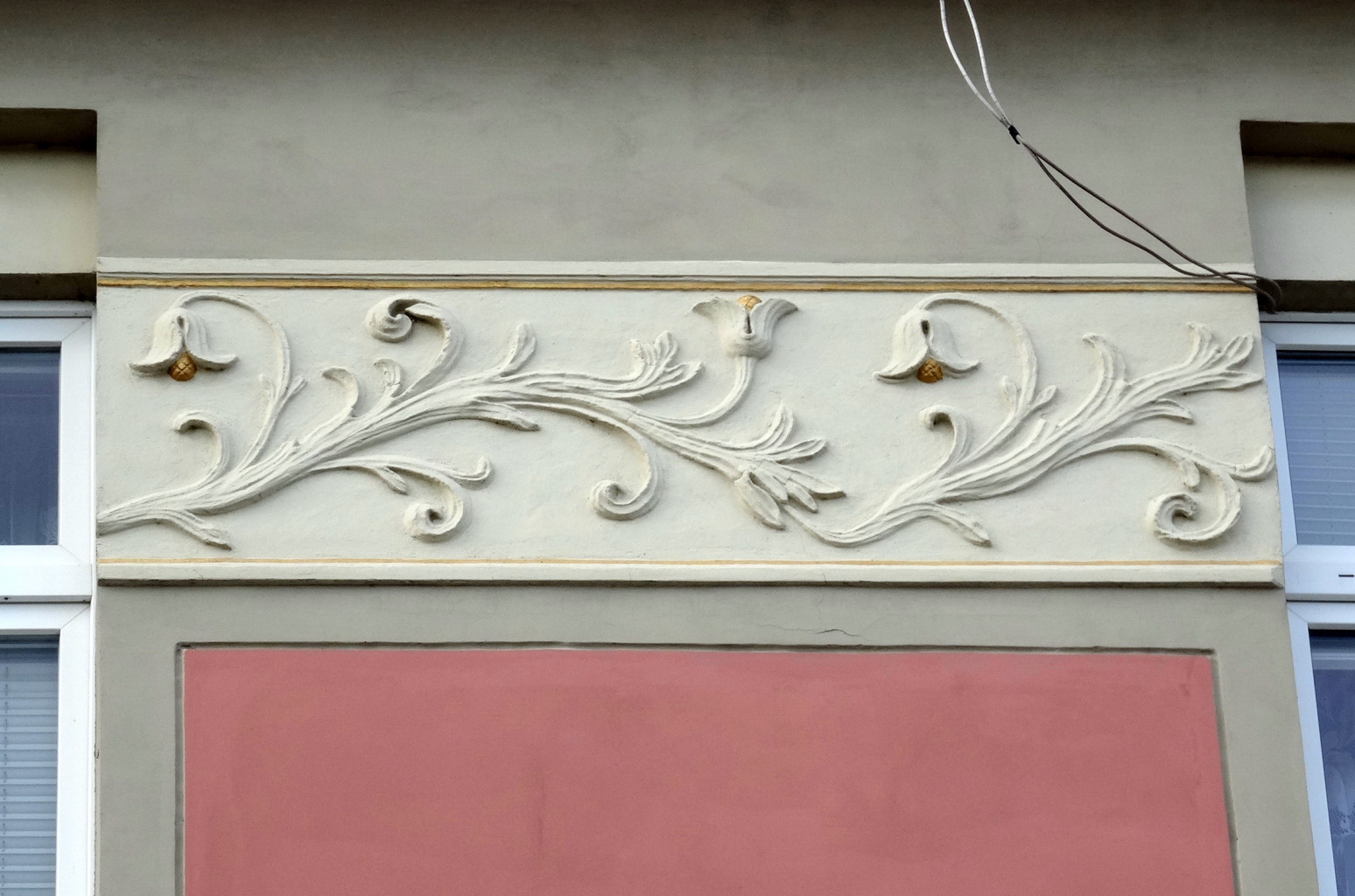
Frieze detail

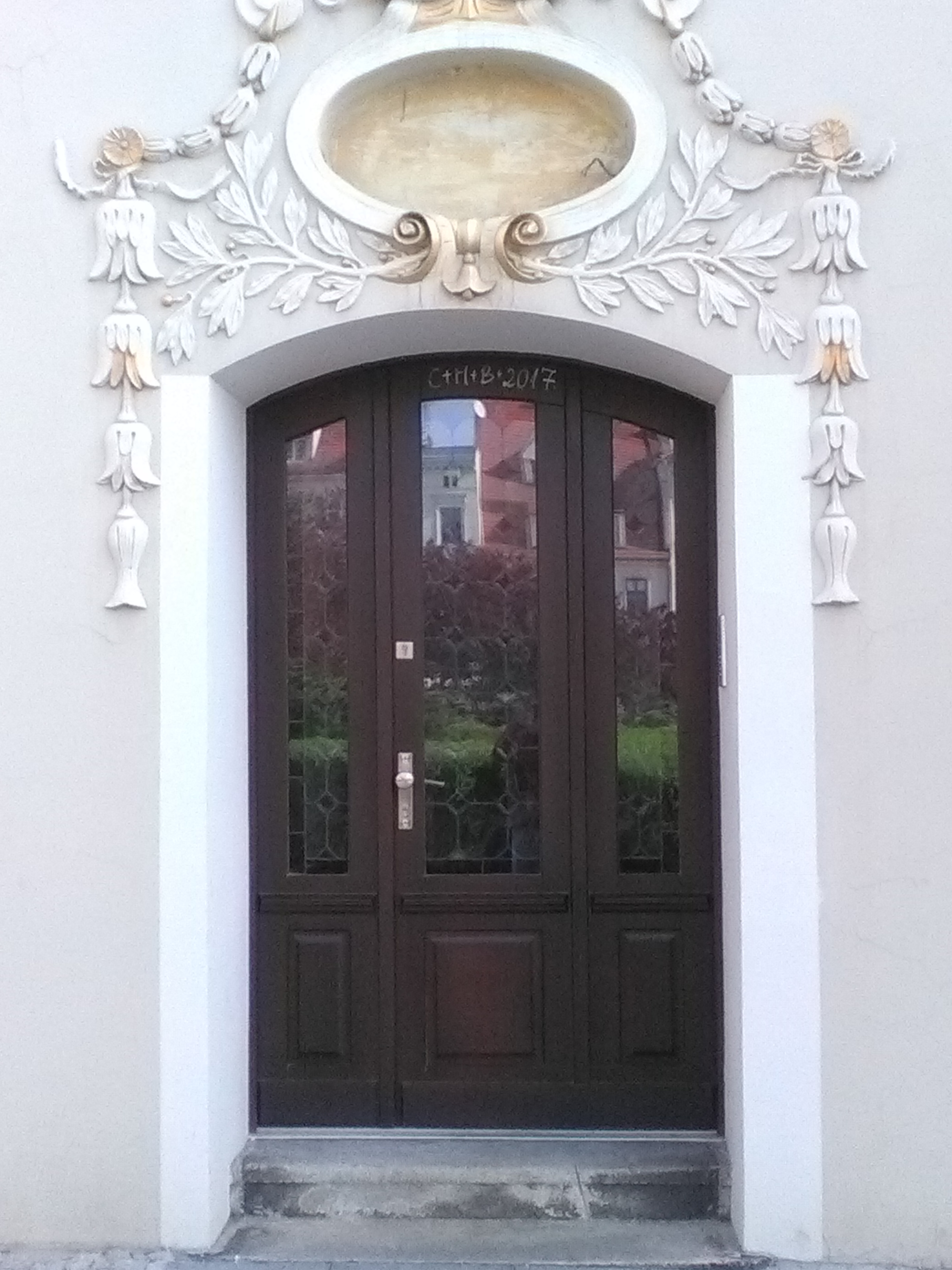
Main door

House at 4

Registered on Kuyavian-Pomeranian Voivodeship Heritage list, Nr.728854 Reg.A/1539 (October 28, 2009)

1776, 1865–1868

Eclecticism

Initially at Alte ßfarrstraße 6, first known owner was a locksmith, August Sedelmeyer, in 1855. This frontage was facing another one (bearing odd numbers) before the destruction of 1940.

The tenement house has been rebuilt and elevated at the end of the 18th century, then rebuilt again in the second half of the 19th century.

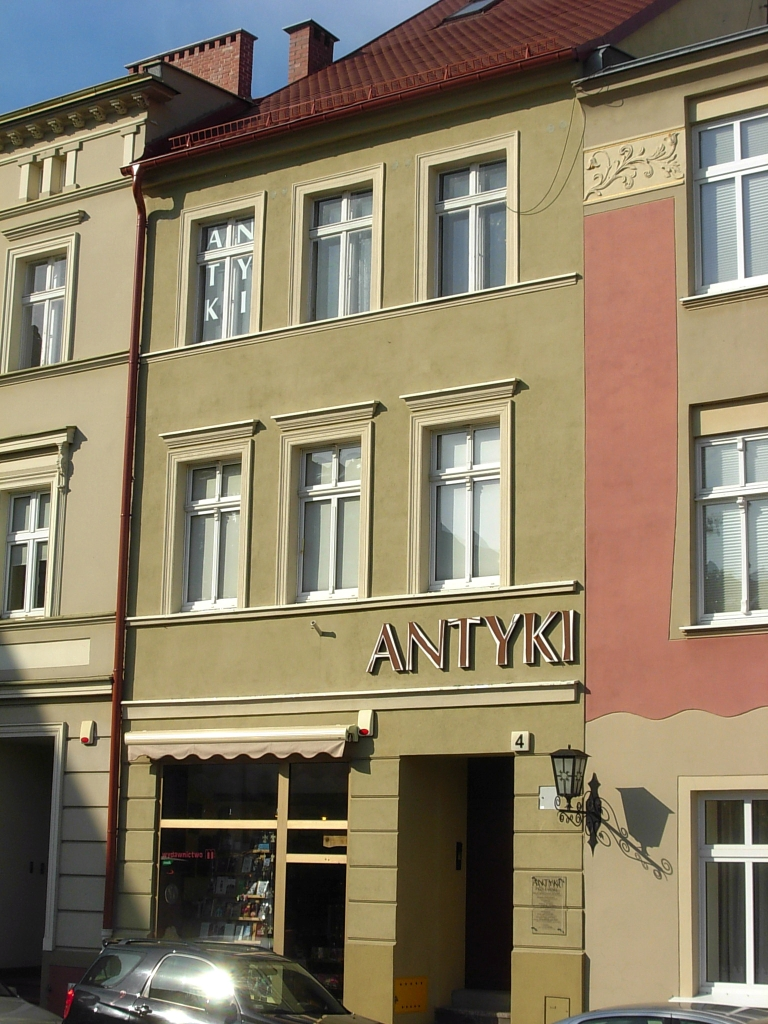
View from the Old Market Square

House at 6

1866

Eclecticism

On the plot is proved to stand there in 1555 a house owned by a tailor, Wawrzyniec Klẹk. A new house was set up in 1593: grand with deep basements, one storey and an attic under a Mansard roof. In the 19th century, Friedrich Krüger, a tailor, owned the building at then Alte ßfarrstraße 5 before it was reconstructed in the 1860s.

In the backyard has been found a commemorative plaque in Latin with the date 1593 and the initials B.K., in memoriam of an owner of the house, Bartłomiej Bartosz Krapiewski, who had a brewery and a mayor of Bydgoszcz from 1599 to 1603. The Krapiewski family lived in Bydgoszcz until 1672. A copy of the plaque has been put in 1961 in the building of the District Museum, at Gdańska Street Nr.4. The facade presents eclectic features with elements of neo-renaissance. The ground floor displays bossage.

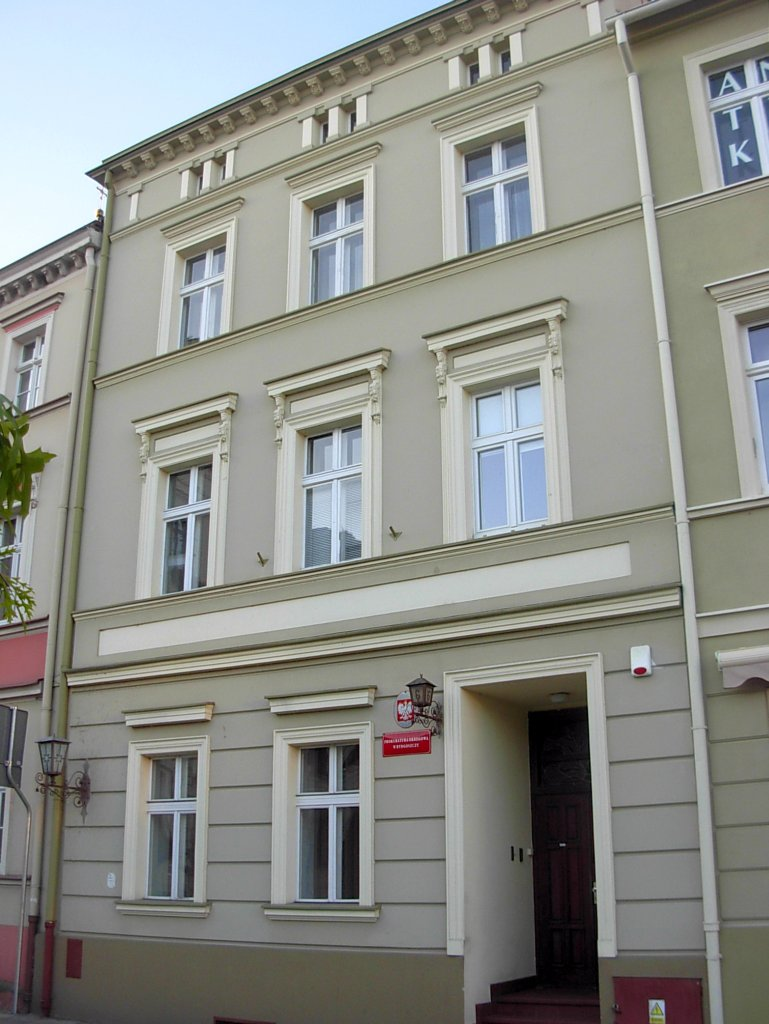
Main frontage

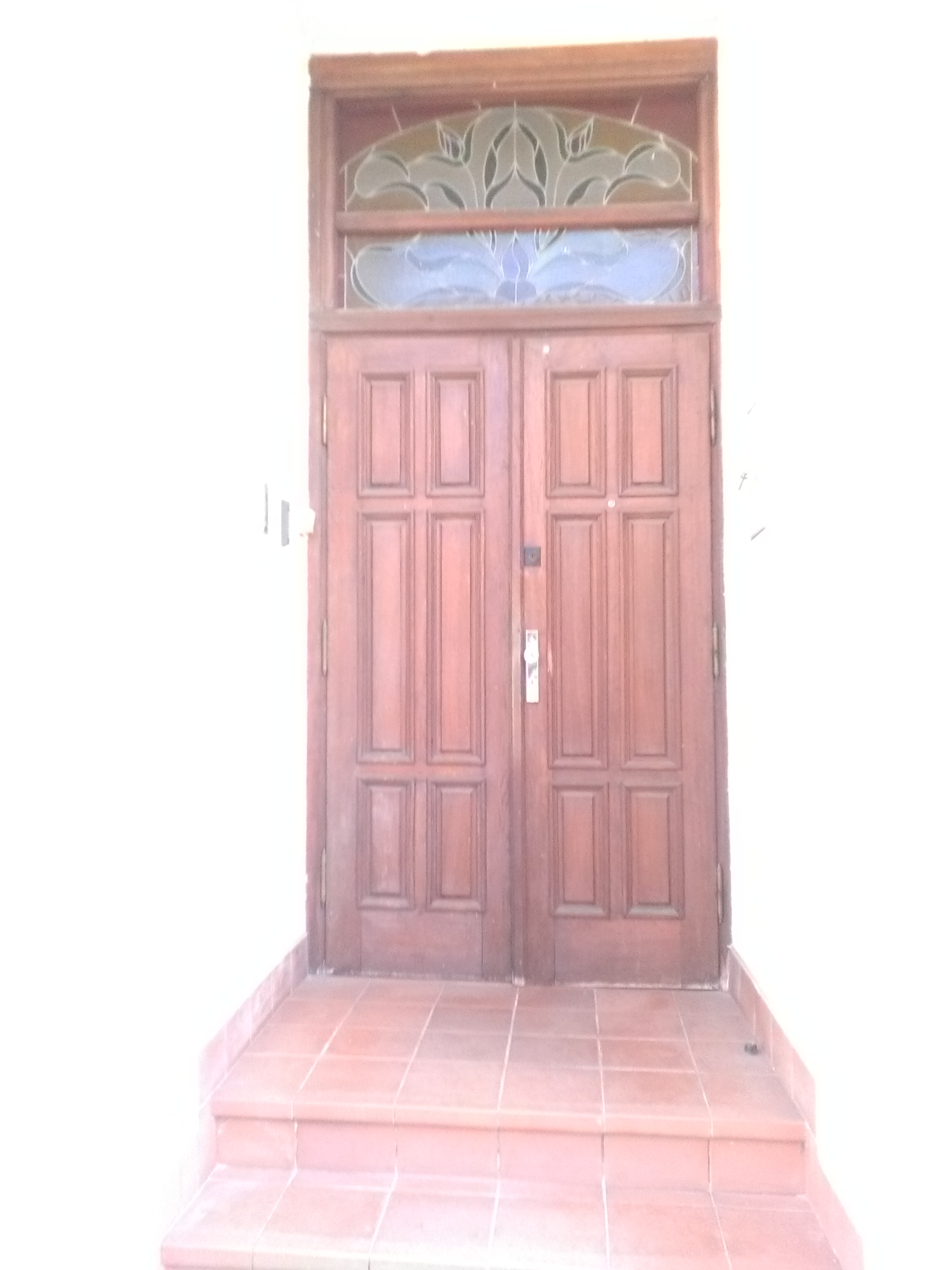
Entrance door, stained glass transom light

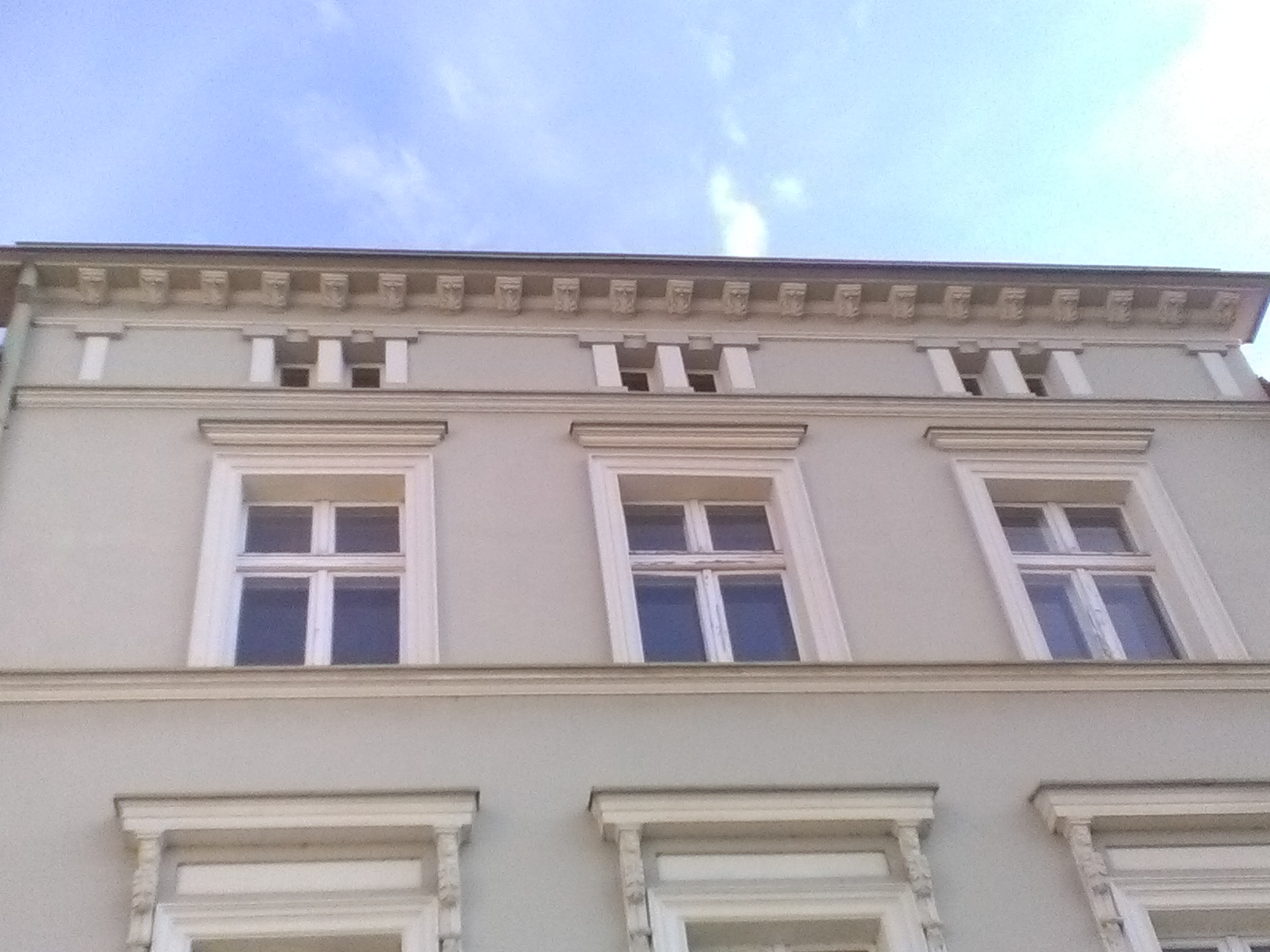
Corbel tables

House at 8

1775-1776

Eclecticism

Actual house dates back to the last quarter of the 18th century, but the basement still possesses preserved fragments from the 16th century. The first registered landlord at Alte ßfarrstraße 4 was Peter Gottlieb Schulß, a member of the justice council in 1855. From 1866 to 1920, the tenement belonged to the Vincent family, merchants known in Bromberg, selling tobacco and cigars. Since 1920, the building has been the property of the catholic church (Polish: Farna) of Bydgoszcz.

The edifice features eclectic elements, borrowed from neo-renaissance: adorned pedimented windows on the first floor and corbel tables crowning the facade.

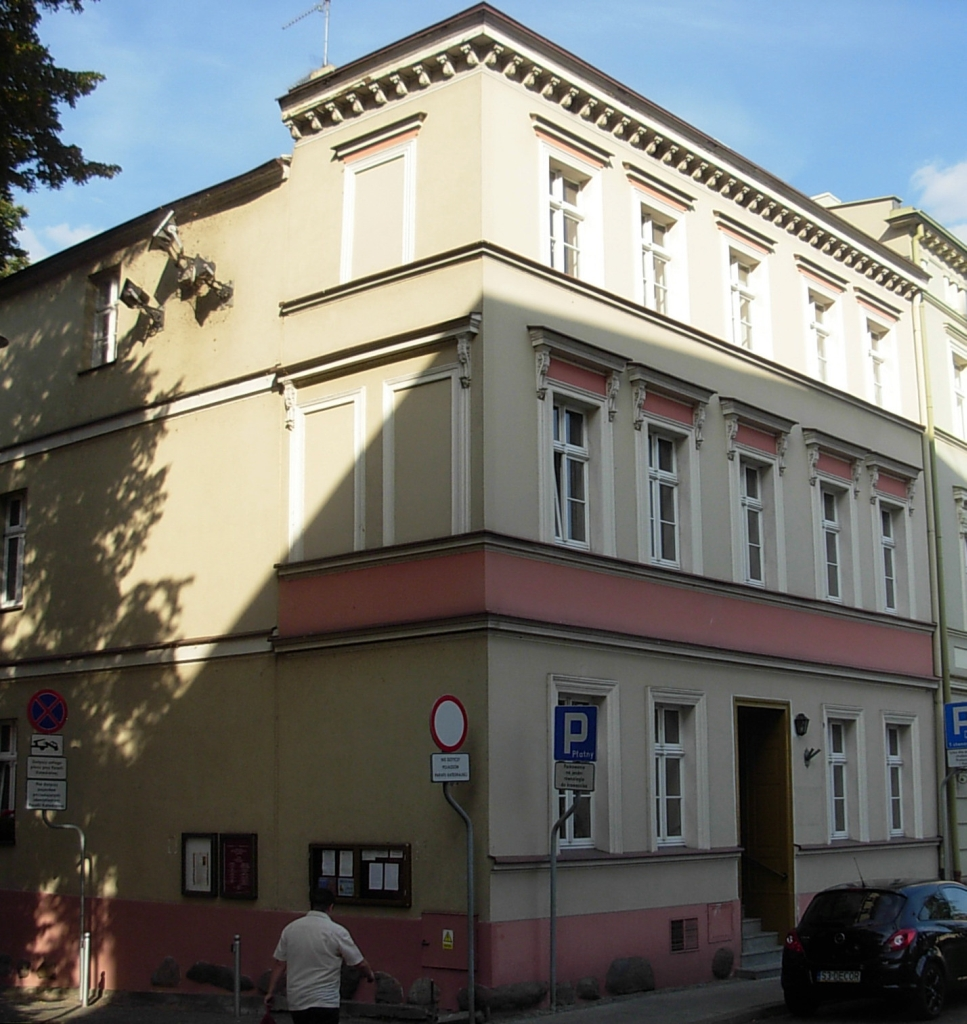
View from the street

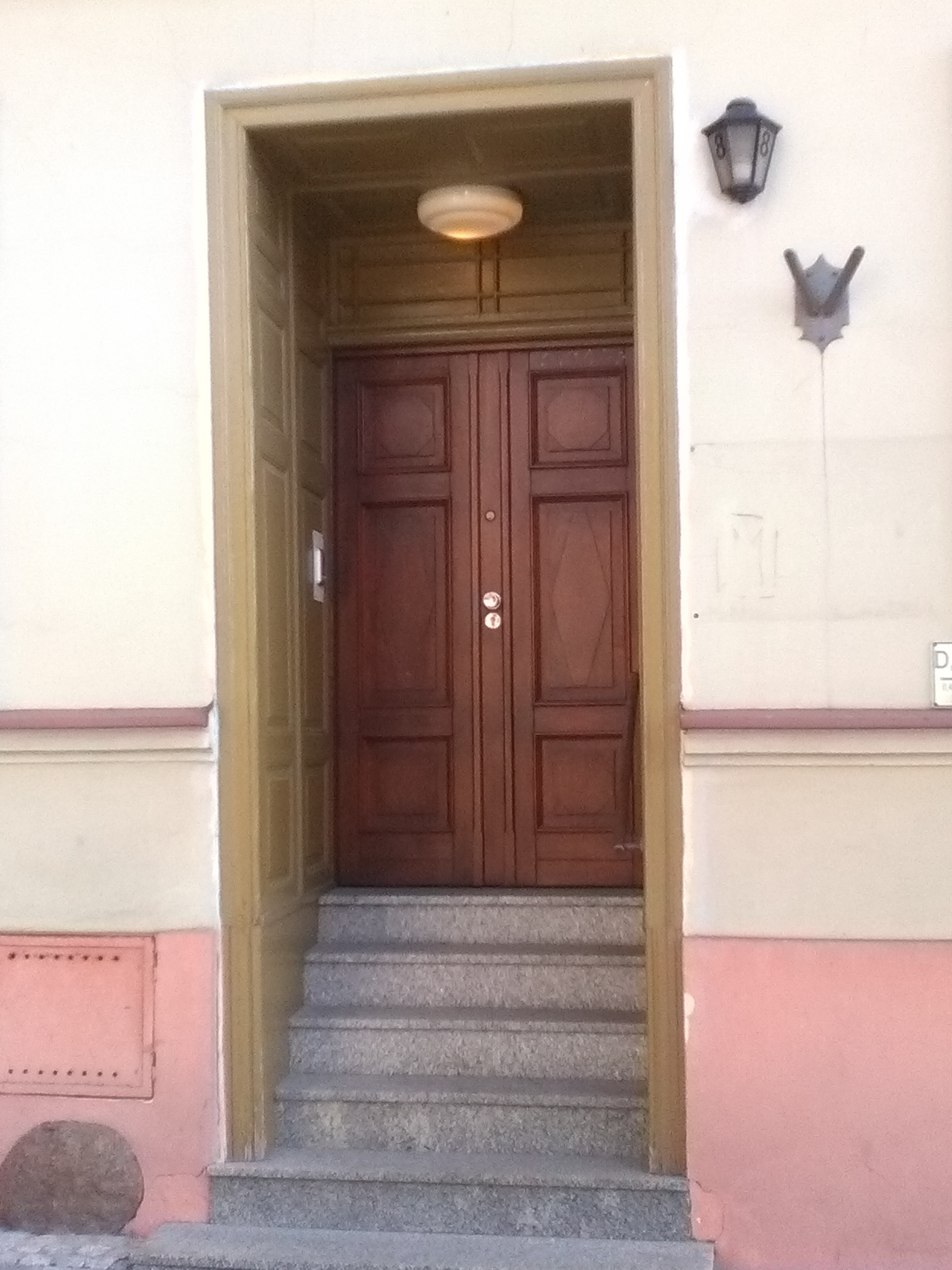
Entrance door

Bydgoszcz City Hall, at 1 Jezuicka Street, corner with Farna Street

Registered on Kuyavian-Pomeranian Voivodeship Heritage list, Nr.601359 Reg. A/783 (May 6, 1992)

1644–1653

Neoclassical architecture

The edifice was initially a Baroque architecture building housing the Jesuit College in Bydgoszcz. The institution was established by Bishop Kasper Działyński and Jerzy Ossoliński, Bydgoszcz Starostwo and Crown Chancellor. In the 17th century, there were apartments for Jesuits, a school with four to five classes, an alleyway adapted for school theater performances during school and church ceremonies, and a music hall for members of the school orchestra.

Main construction works were carried out from 1644 to 1653, under the direction of Jesuit builder Wojciech Przybyłkowicz. An expansion of the college was performed in 1696, thanks to funds donation made by Jan Stefan Komorowski, Malbork Regent, brother of Wojciech, then rector of Bydgoszcz Jesuit College (1689). Further constructions were carried out in the college between 1697 and 1709 under the direction of Wojciech Głaznowicz, the last major reconstruction happening in 1726–1740. Jesuit college and St Ignatius of Loyola Church composed one of the most magnificent ensemble in Bydgoszcz. It struck less by the level of decoration than the quality of its various important guests: John II Casimir and his wife, together with Frederick William and his spouse in 1657, officers and generals of the Swedish and Russian armies during armed conflicts in the 17th and 18th centuries.

After the Suppression of the Society of Jesus in 1773, the building was used as a Prussian Gymnasium. In the time of the Duchy of Warsaw, there was a Department of Primary School (1808–1812) and later a faculty (1812–1815) faculty. At that time, the school received the visit, among others, of Julian Ursyn Niemcewicz, Tadeusz Czacki; Stefan Florian Garczyński Polish poet and friend of Adam Mickiewicz studied there.

After the Third Partition of Poland (1795), a Prussian royal gymnasium was set up in the building (1871). In 1879, the ensemble was purchased by the municipality and became the seat of the city hall. To fit its need, municipal authorities ordered a reconstruction in 1878, supervised by building counselor Wilhelm Lincke, and helped by chief mason Albert Rose and chief carpenter Heinrich Mautz (who designed in 1845 Buchholz's tannery). Works remodeled the facade and adapted interiors layout to the needs of office activities. The opening ceremony took place on December 19, 1879.

As a result of the reconstructions made in 1697, 1702, and during the 19th century, the edifice has gradually lost its original Baroque architecture to display Neoclassical features. The two-storey construction is a brick, plastered edifice with basement. Some rooms are barrel vaulted. The Town Hall is the only preserved fragment of the former Jesuit complex. The monastery and the church have been demolished in 1940. From 1994 to 1996, a general refurbishment of the facility was carried out, including a modernization and expansion of the eastern wing. On April 19, 2017, a new town hall clock has been unveiled on the facade.

On the walls of the building are placed several plaques commemorating:

- On the northern side, the 600th anniversary of Bydgoszcz (1946);
- On the eastern side, the anniversary of the liberation of the city from German occupation (1950).
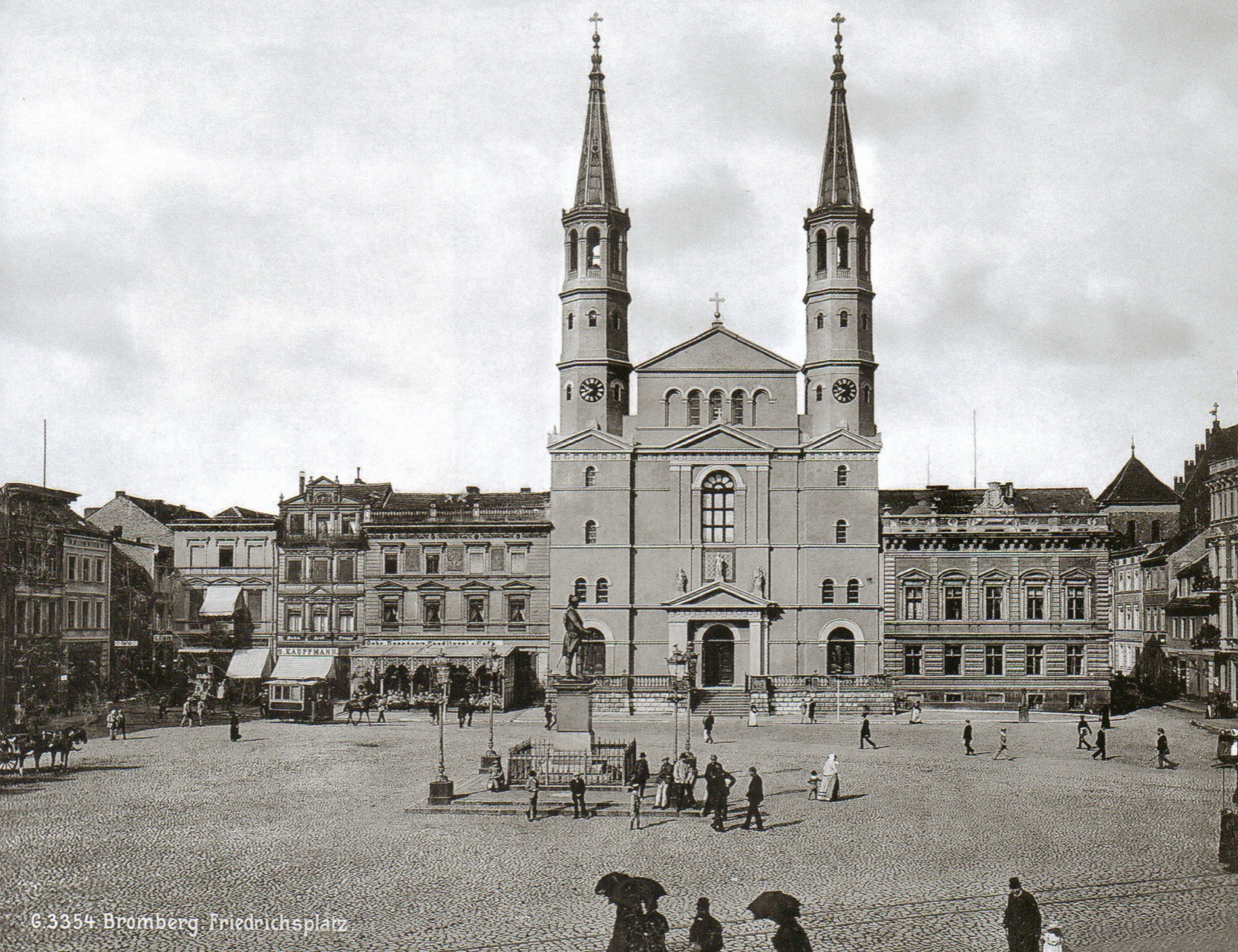
View of the Jesuit ensemble ca 1895

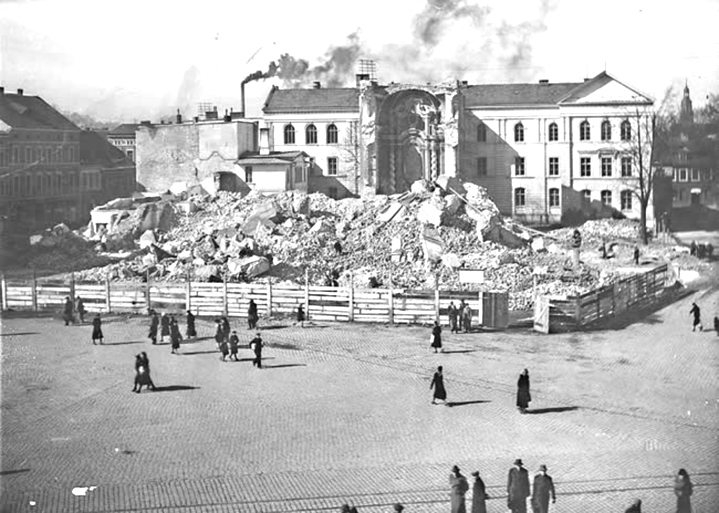
Ruins of the complex in 1940

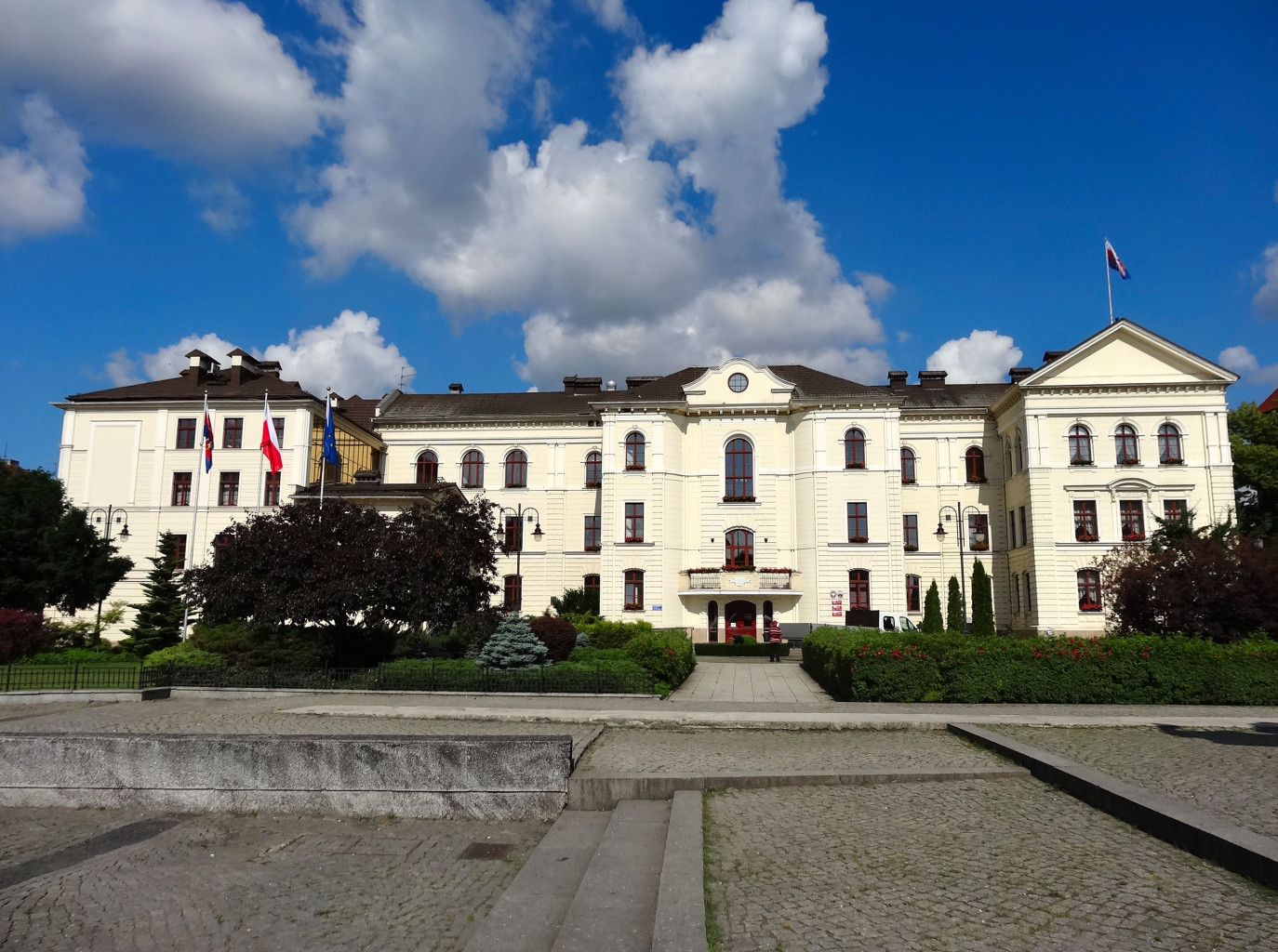
View from the Old Market Place

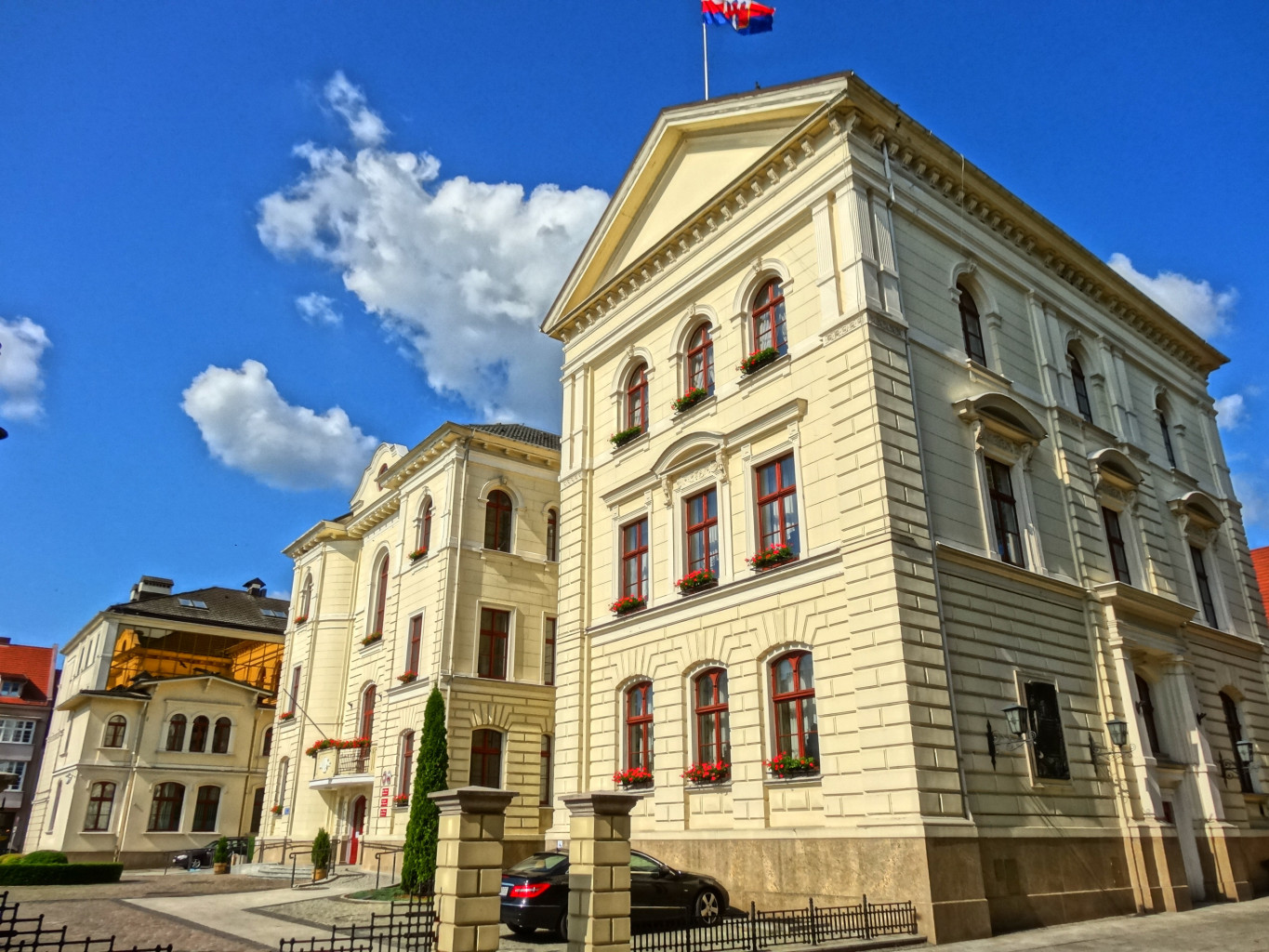
View in the back of the glassy renovated addition

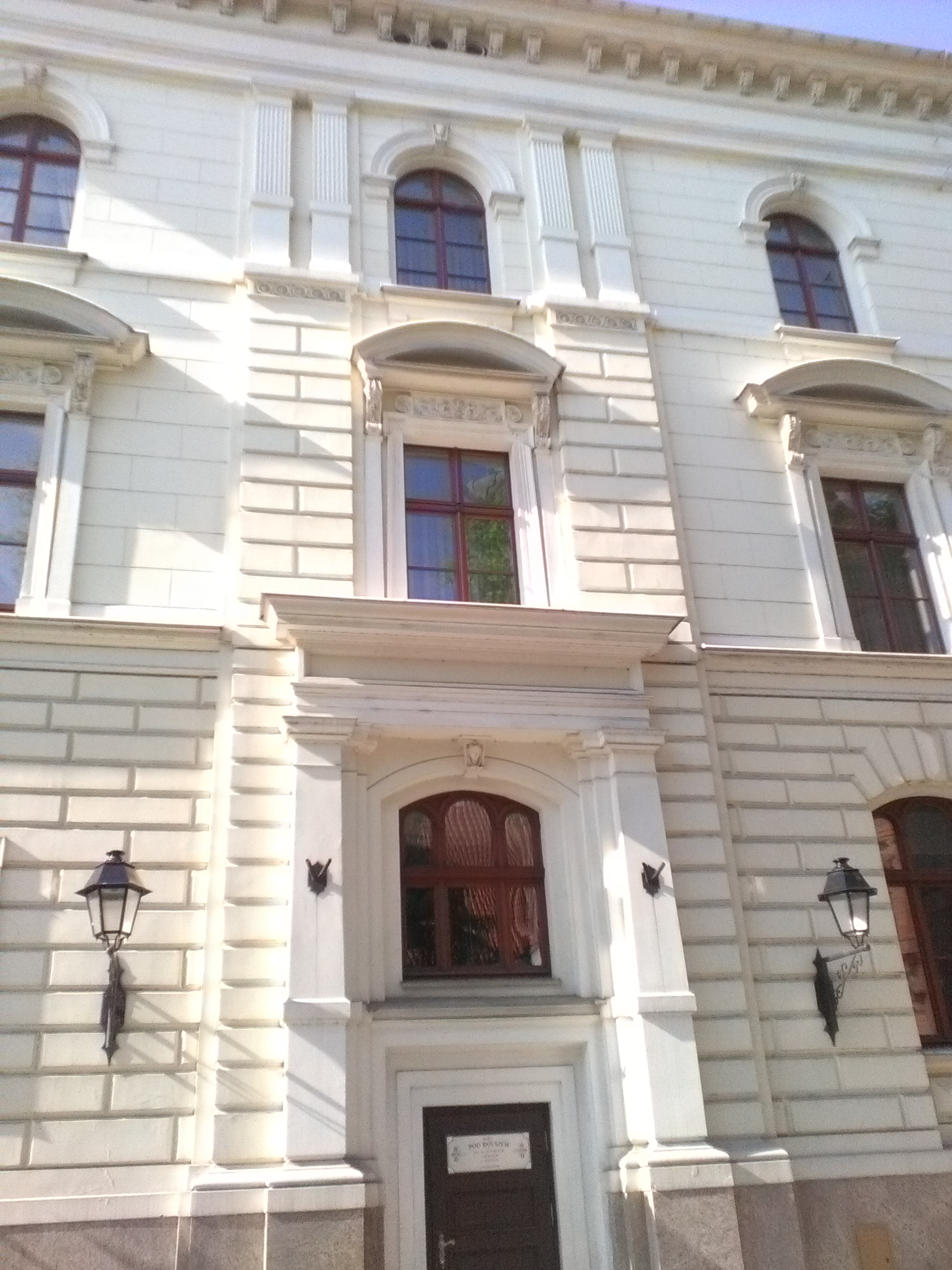
Side entrance on Farna street

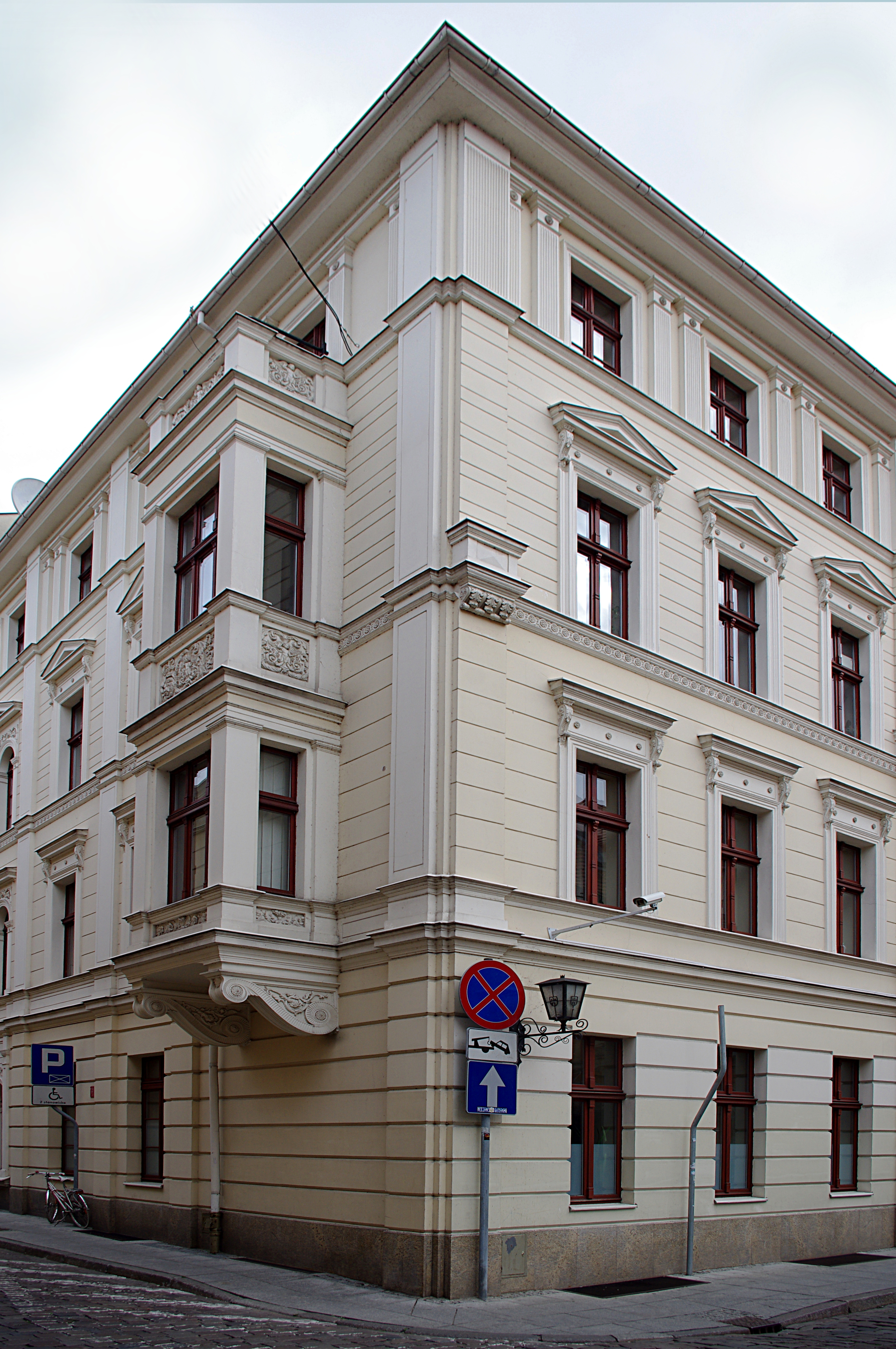
Detail of a bay window

Cathedral of the Roman Catholic Diocese of Bydgoszcz, at Nr.10

Registered on Kuyavian-Pomeranian Voivodeship Heritage list, Nr.601220 Reg.A/740 (November 3, 1960)

1425–1502

Gothic architecture

St. Martin and St. Nicholas Cathedral is a Catholic church built in the 15th century in Bydgoszcz. It is the old town parish church Polish: farna, the cathedral of the diocese of Bydgoszcz. The edifice houses in particular the painting Our Lady of Love (Polish: Obraz Matki Bożej Pięknej Miłości). The church is the most valuable monument of Old Polish architecture in the city.

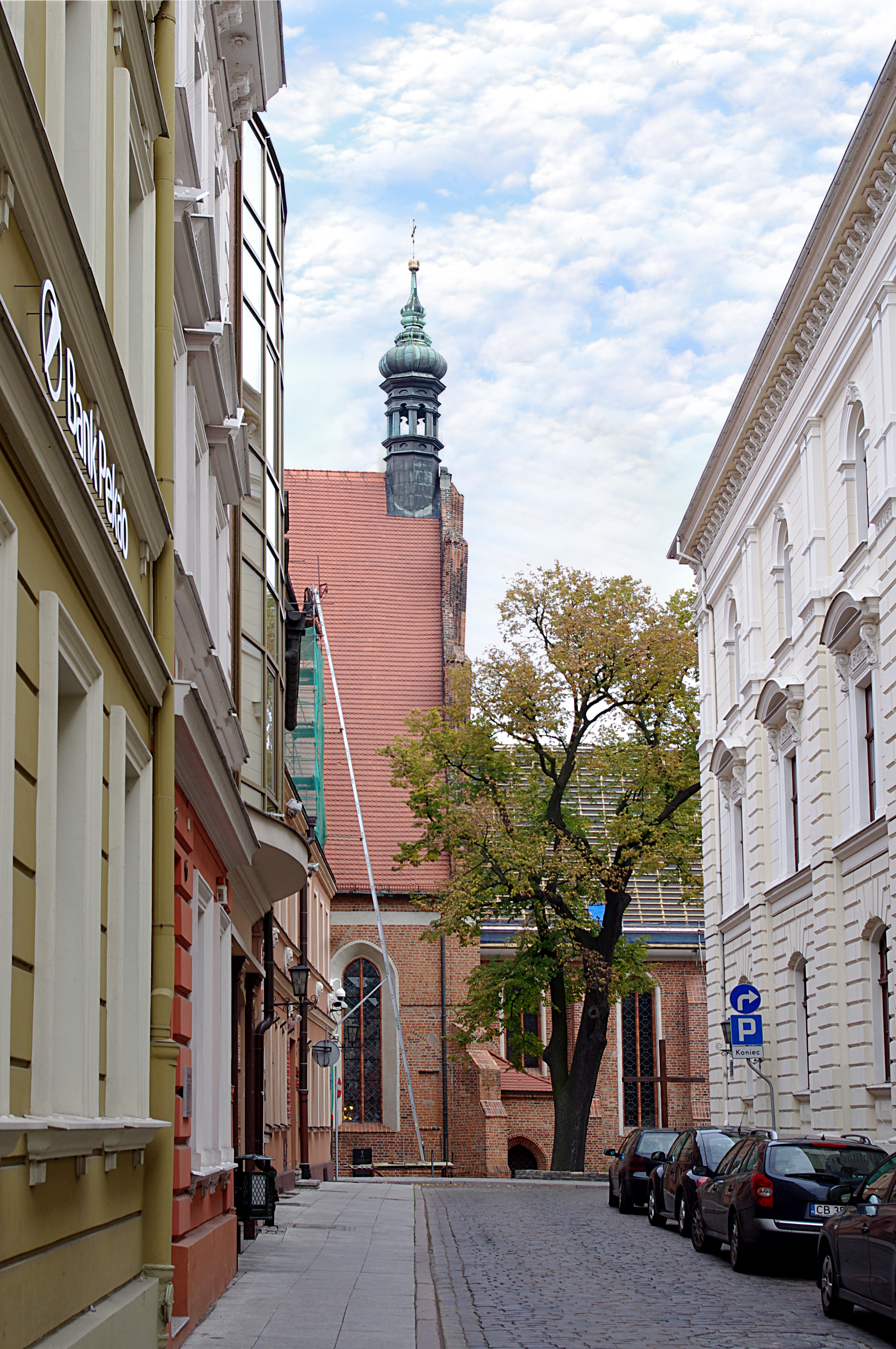
View from Jezuicka Street

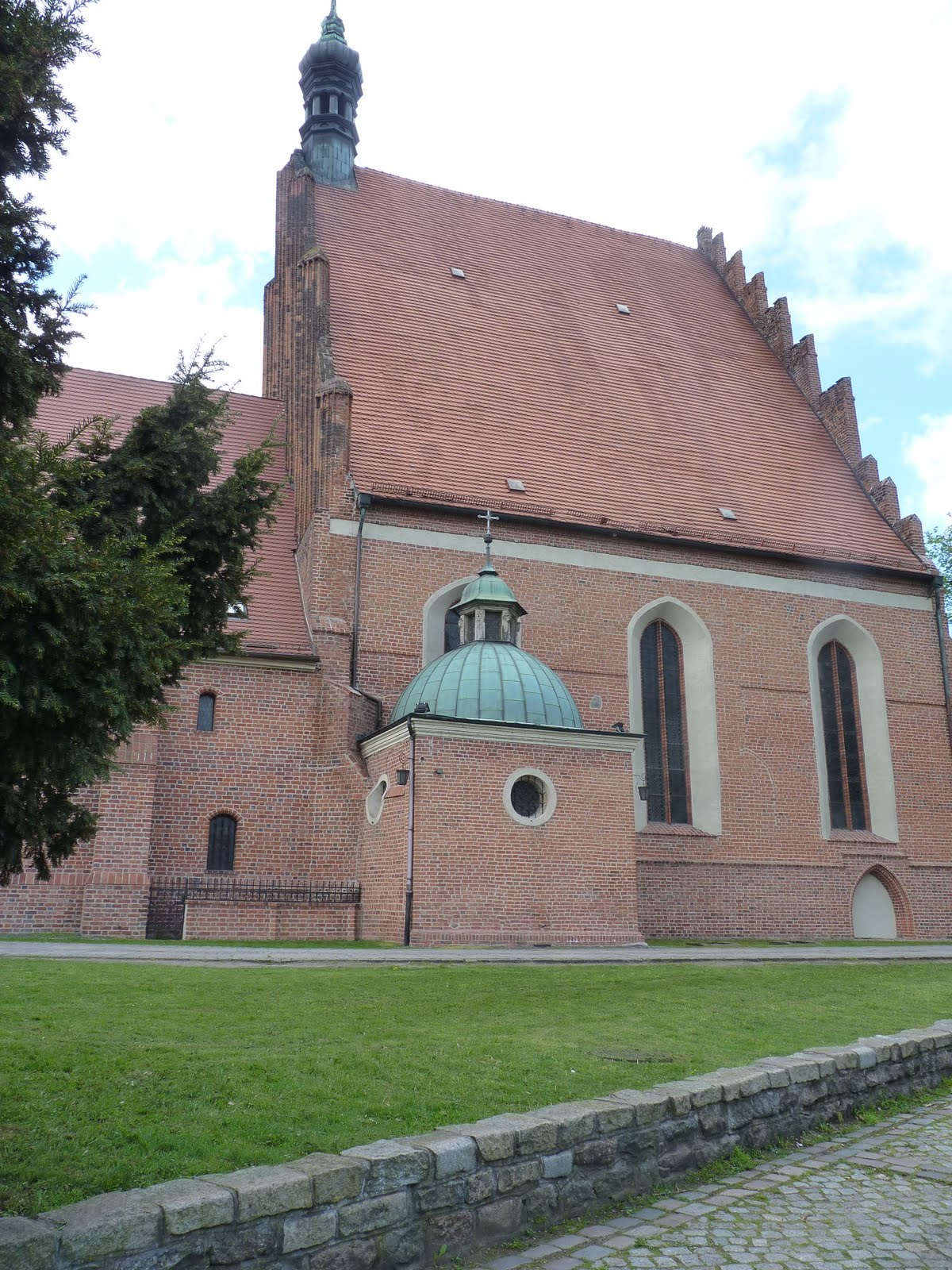
View from the western end of Farna street

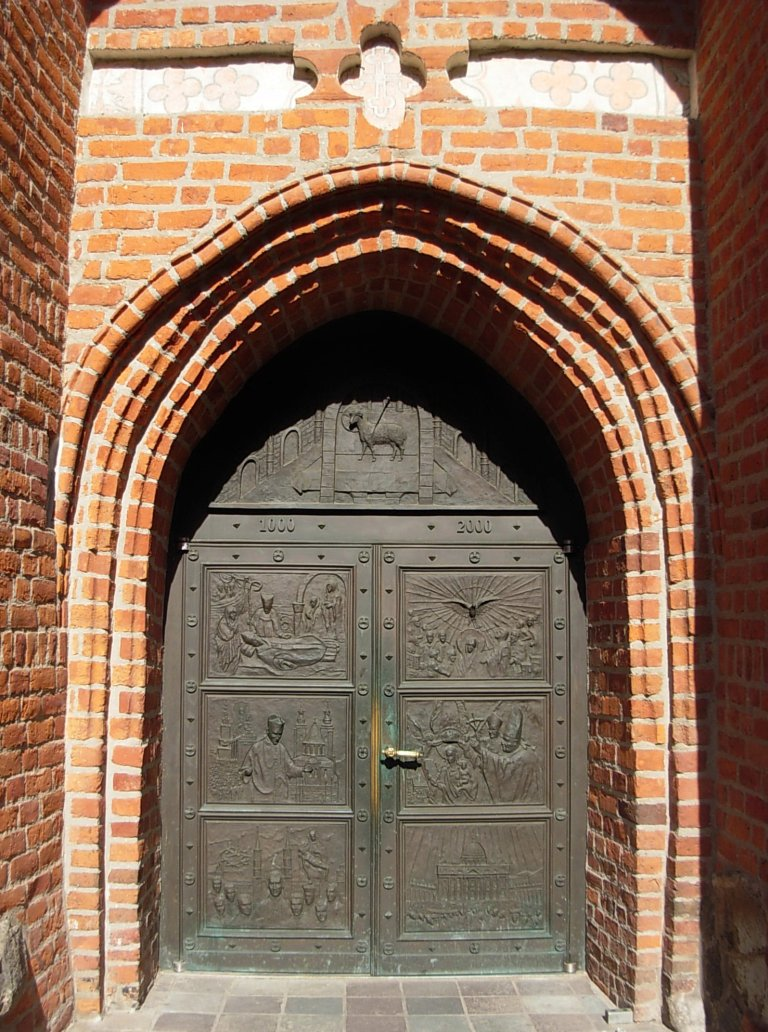
Main portal

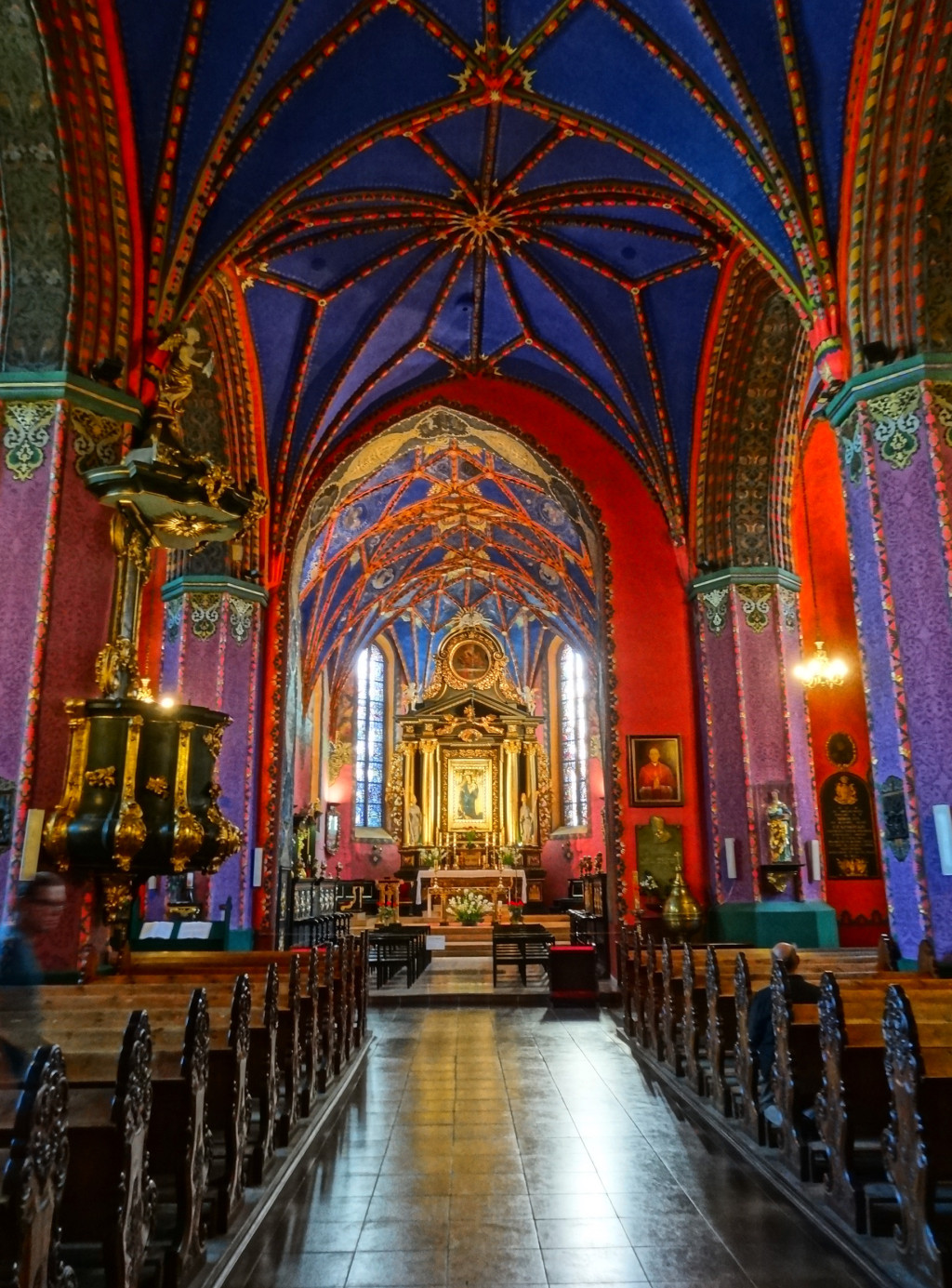
View of the nave

House at Jezuicka street 2, corner with Farna Street

Registered on Kuyavian-Pomeranian Voivodeship Heritage list, Nr.601360 Reg.A/883 (January 27, 1971)

1780

Baroque architecture

The first building on this plot was probably erected in the 15th century, as were most of the surrounding houses, but later destroyed, burned or abandoned. The house was rebuilt in the 1770s-1780s, in the Polish baroque style, its address was then Neue Pfarrstraße 14. In 1899, it was closely linked to the neighboring house at Nr.4, housing offices of the "Stadtbriefpost Hansa", a post office ran by Mrs Schwarz, a widow.

At the end of WWII, the building, then nationalized, fell into disrepair. Renovation only occurred in 1980, as one of the first houses aimed by the city project of restoration of the Old Town. Since that time the building houses the Bydgoszcz Scientific Society, with a scientific library, a reading room, editorial offices, a conference hall and a studio. In the 1990s, moved there the Library of the History Department of Kazimierz Wielki University, the Department of Culture of the City Hall, the Office of the State Service for the Protection of Monuments (Polish: Państwowa Służba Ochrony Zabytków, PSOZ), and the Provincial and Municipal Office for the Protection of Monuments.

The townhouse has two storey with an attic and eyelid dormers; its horseshoe-shape footprint has wings onto Jezuicka, Farna and Przyrzecze streets. The upper part of the house displays an 18th-century Polish Baroque style, a passageway with an 18th-century preserved courtyard and an open wooden gallery. Front elevation on Jezuicka street is adorned with medallion-shaped sgraffiti designed by Witold Wasik, representing five scientists and artists associated with Bydgoszcz and the region: Emil Warmiński, Jan Kasprowicz, Jan Śniadecki, Jędrzej Śniadecki and Leon Wyczółkowski.

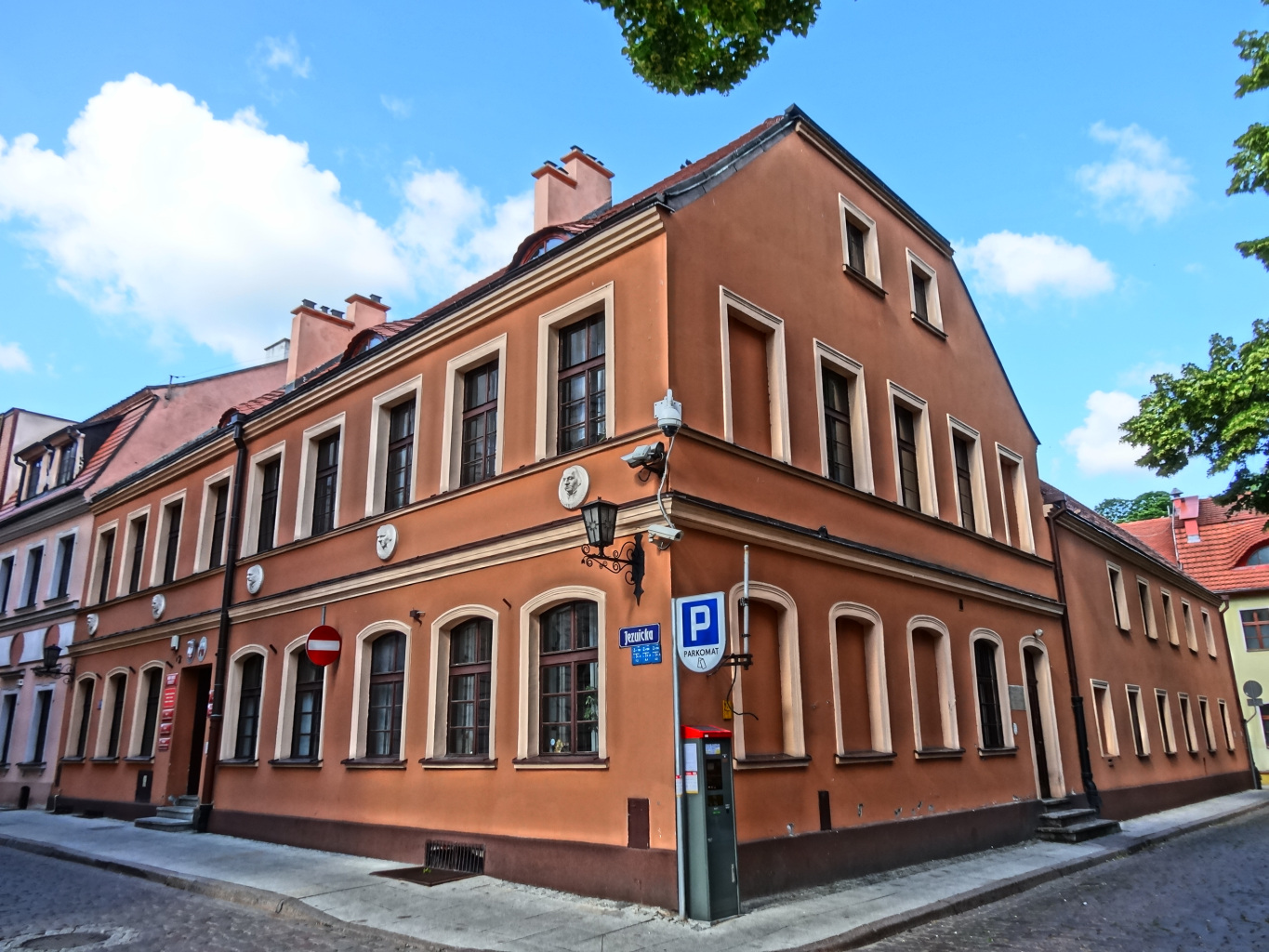
View from Farna street

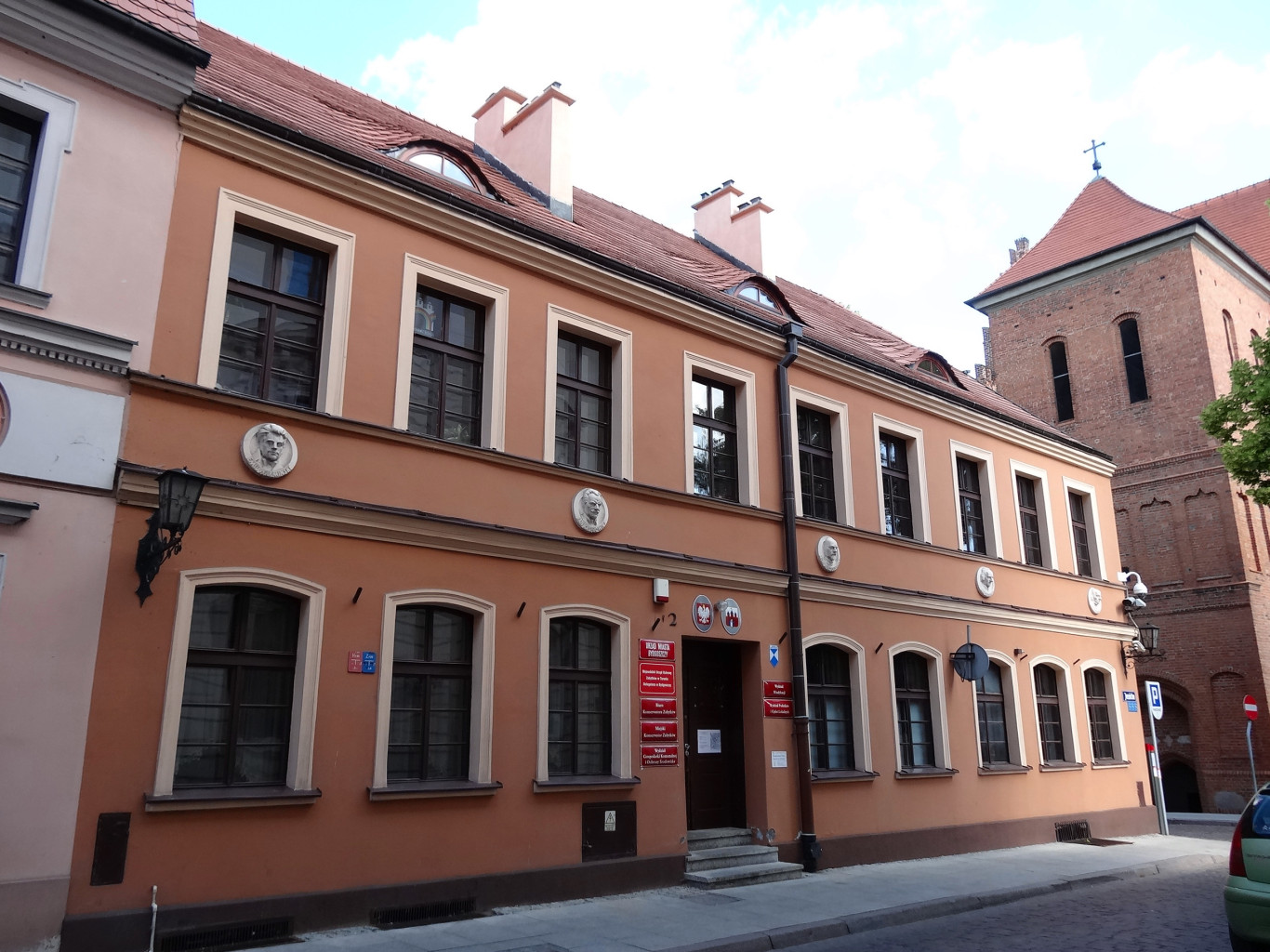
Facade viewed from Jezuicka Street, with famous figure medallions

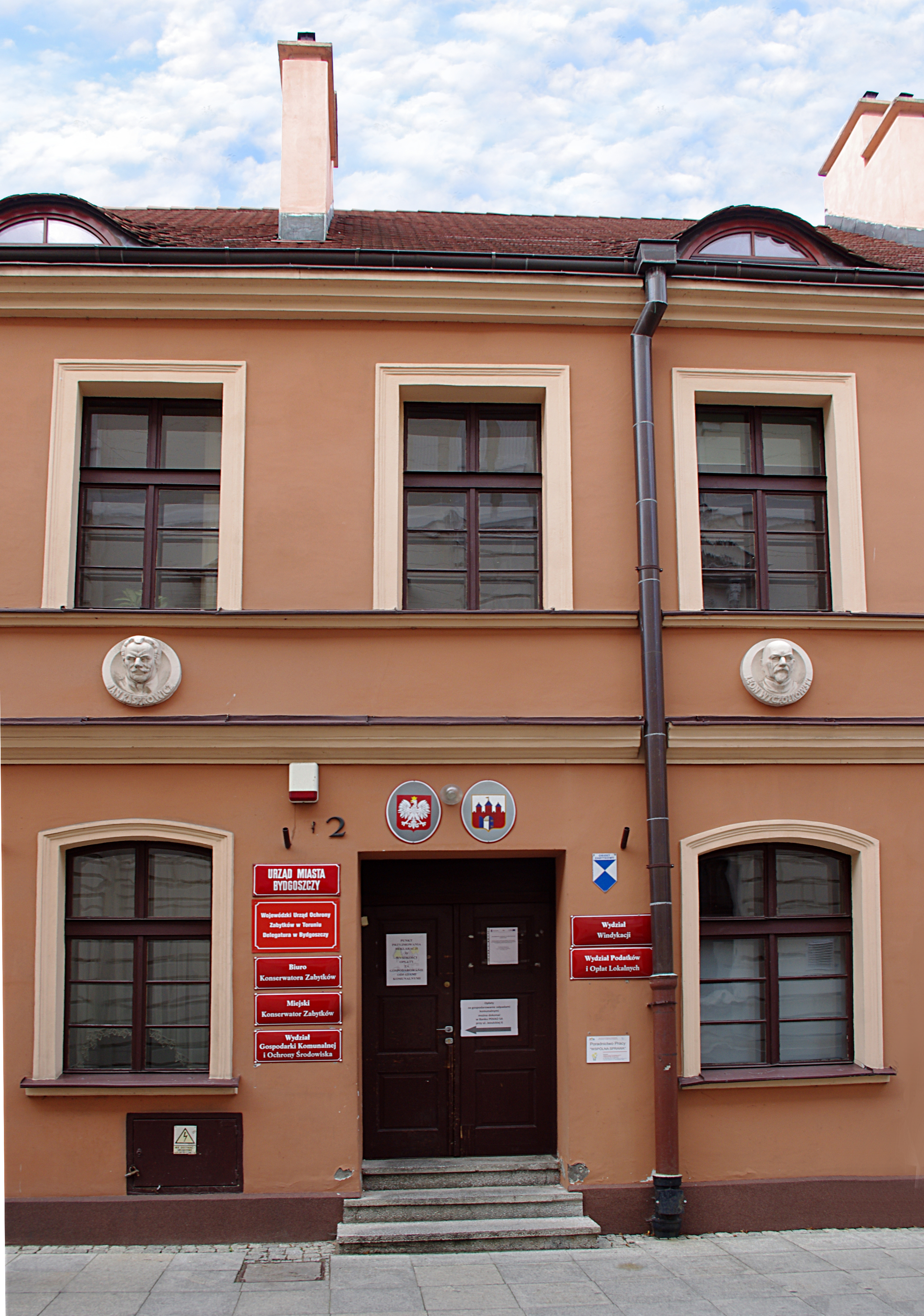
Main door, topped by eyelid dormers

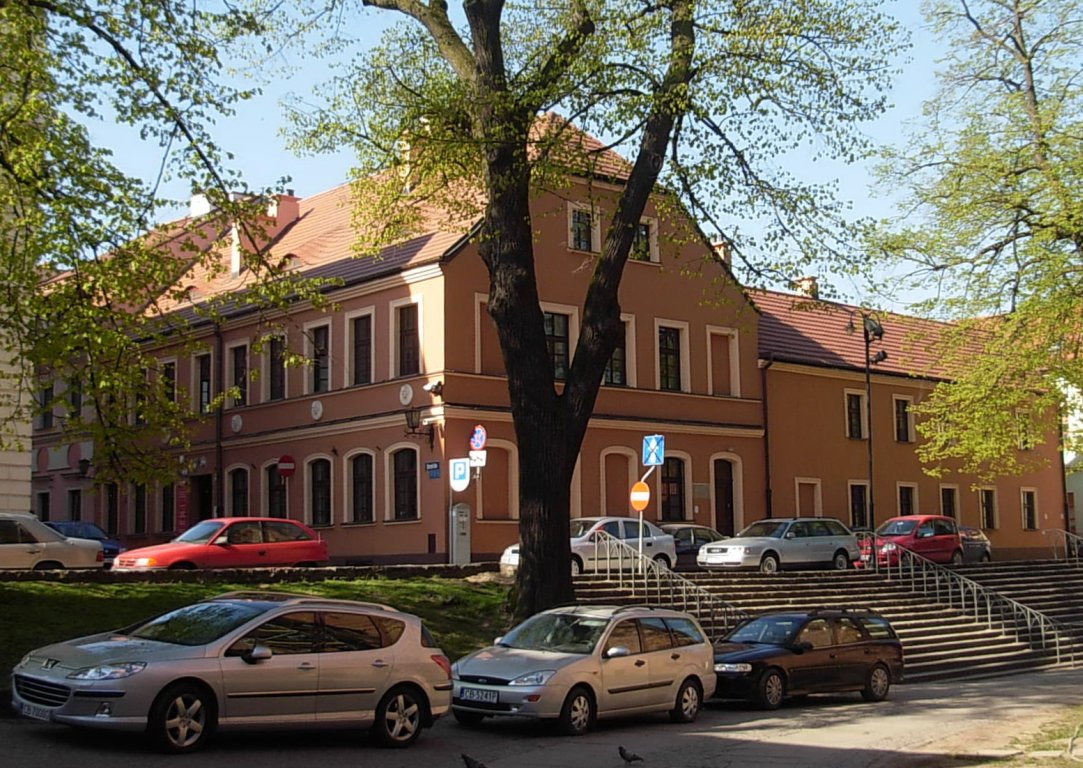
View from the cathedral frontcourt

Building of parish school in Bydgoszcz, at 10

Registered on Kuyavian-Pomeranian Voivodeship Heritage list, Nr.601289 Reg.A/994 (December 17, 1991)

1834-1854

Wattle and daub

The exact date of creation of the parish school in Bydgoszcz is unknown, but its origins are related to the creation of the parish church in Bydgoszcz, and the privileges associated with it, around 1346. The building opened after the middle of the 14th century: first graduates traveled to Kraków to the Jagiellonian University around 1419 The parish school was an institution in the city landscape and in the awareness of its inhabitants, being then housed in a brick building containing several chambers, on the edge of the churchyard cemetery, on the plot of today's house at street in Przyrzecze street 2. In 1532, about 150 boys were registered, making it an important school at the time. It was then managed by the parson of the church. The main task of the school was to educate the youth, who later would perform the duties of priests. However, in the 15th century, its role changed in favor of a more "secular" curriculum: counting, measuring, reading and writing in Latin. A first level of the curriculum (Latin: trivium) included Latin, grammar, rhetoric and dialectic. The higher degree (Latin: quadrivium) covered arithmetic, geometry, music and astronomy. Further studies were possible in collegiate, and later at university. In the 17th century, the school declined, victim of the competition of the newly opened Jesuit College and established academic institutions in Gdańsk, Elbląg, Toruń or Chełmno.

By the beginning of the 18th century, the building was almost ruined, despite the efforts of the town council to take over the totality of school's costs. The construction in itself was used as a barn, and pupils transferred to a basic house erected on the eastern wall of the sacristy, furnished with benches and tiled stables. During Prussian times, the actual building was erected (1834–1854) to meet the needs of the parish school, on the site of the older derelict edifice.

In 1947 the building, part of Bydgoszcz parish estate, was transformed into a parish kindergarten. In 1982, the newly appointed Vicar of Bydgoszcz, Jan Viktor Nowak, inaugurated in the house the Primate Institute of Christian Culture - Cardinal Stefan Wyszyński (Polish: Prymasowski Instytut Kultury Chrześcijańskiej). In 1989, the institute was granted the status of State higher education institution. In 1990, it has been affiliated to the Theological Faculty of the Adam Mickiewicz University in Poznań; since 1998, it is an official section of Poznań Theological University. With the establishment of the Diocese of Bydgoszcz in 2004, and the move, three years later, of the seat of the High Seminary of Bydgoszcz Diocese to the historic building at Grodzka Street 18, it was decided to move also the Primate Institute there. Since that time, the former parish school houses the library of the Primate Institute of Christian Culture.

The long and low roof house has been erected in the middle of the 19th century, following wattle and daub technique that reminds of its old history. In the 1990s, the Institute had a thorough renovation carried out to fit its needs.

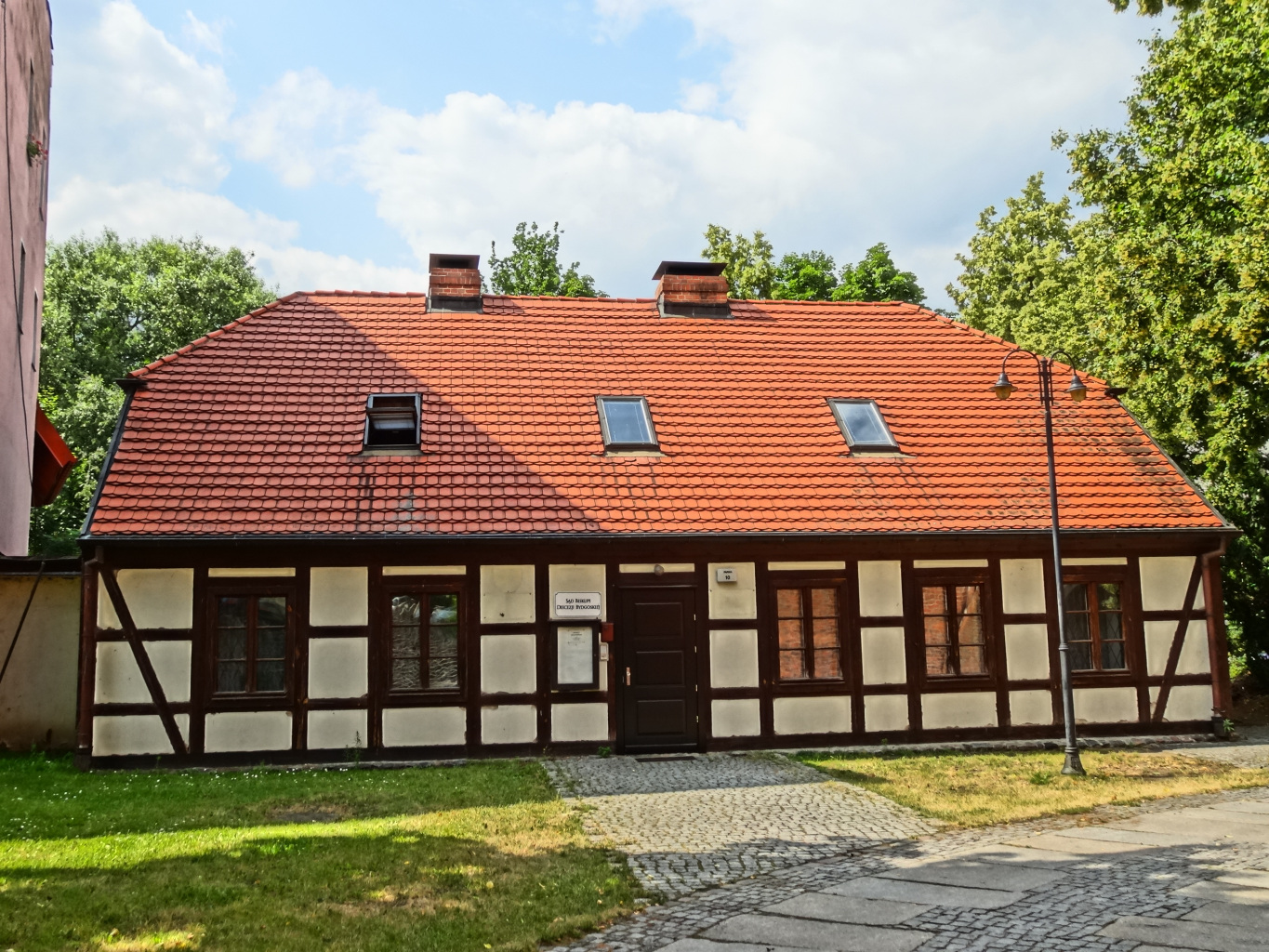
View from the cathedral

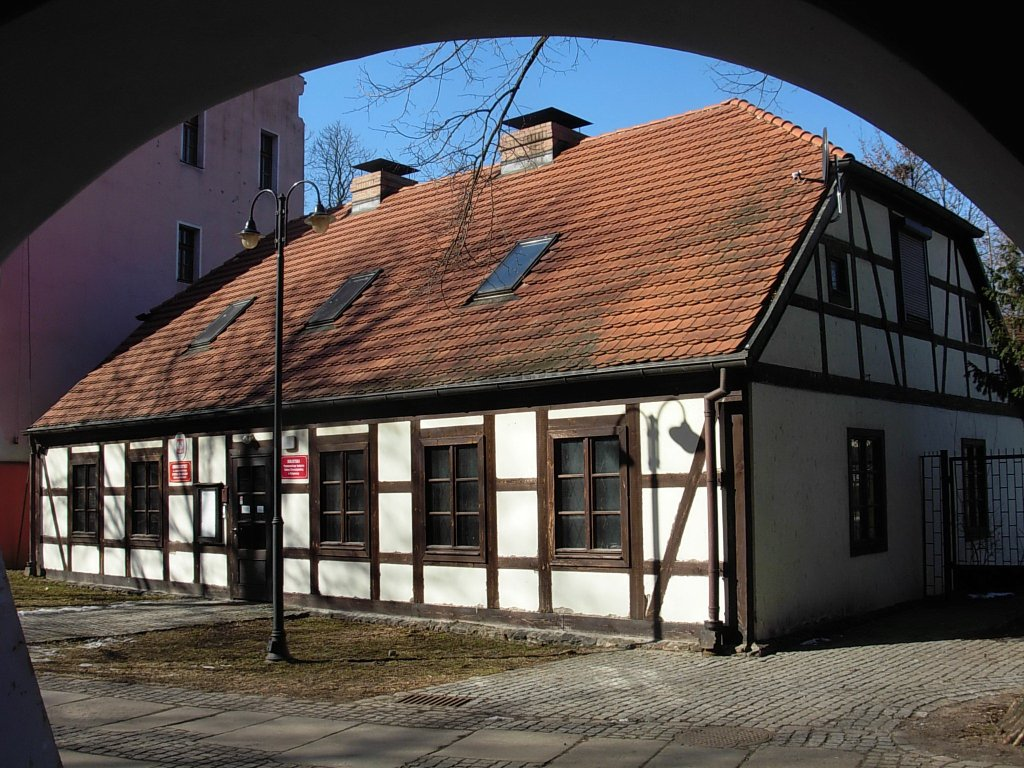
Side view

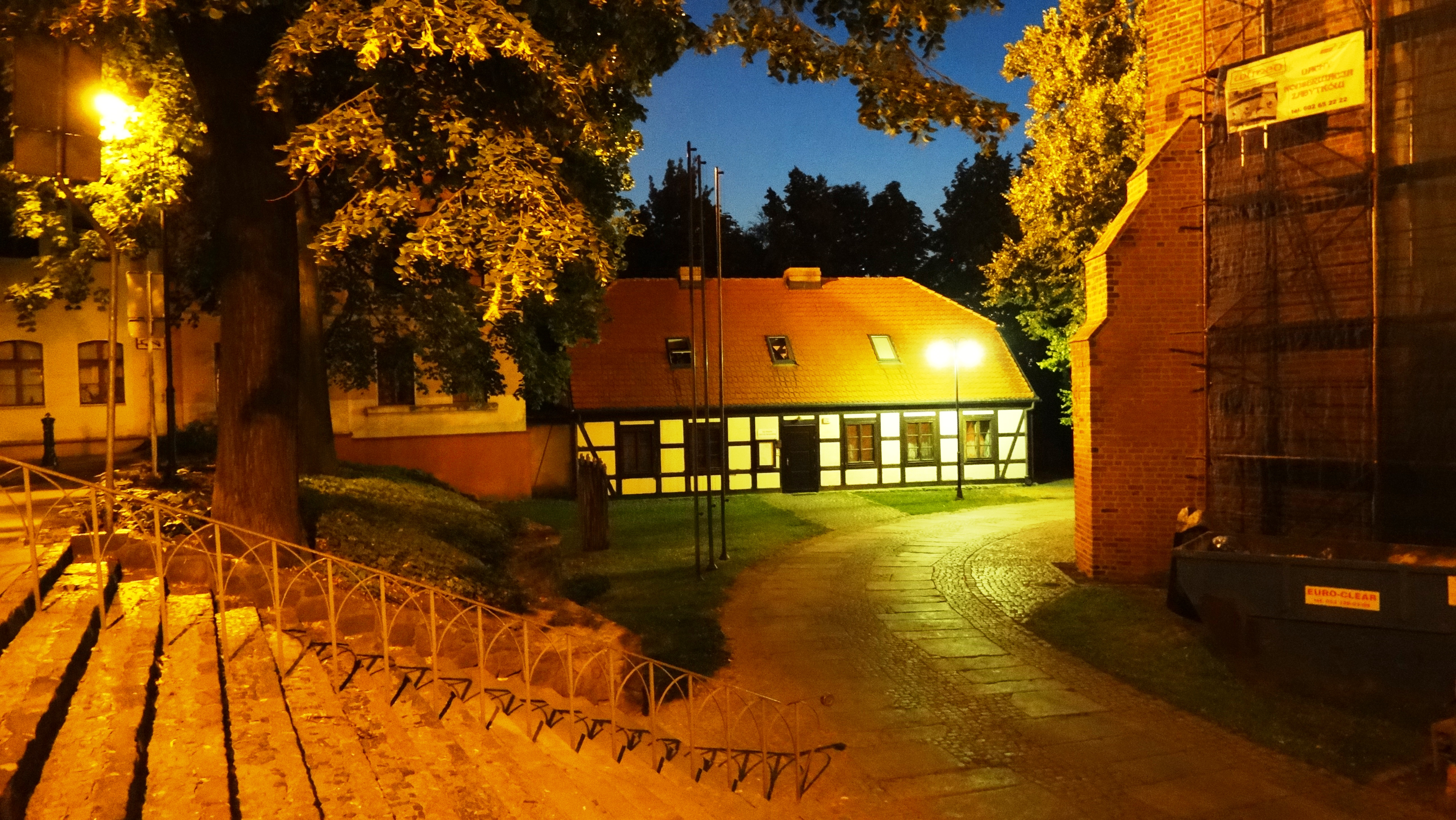
by night

== See also ==
- Bydgoszcz
- Bydgoszcz Architects (1850-1970s)

== Bibliography ==
- (in Polish) Derenda, Jerzy (2006). Piękna stara Bydgoszcz – tom I z serii Bydgoszcz miasto na Kujawach. Bydgoszcz: Towarzystwo Miłośników Miasta Bydgoszczy.
- (in Polish) Umiński, Janusz (1996). Bydgoszcz. Przewodnik. Bydgoszcz: Regionalny Oddział PTTK "Szlak Brdy".
- Pawlak, Marian (2009). Kolegium Jezuickie w Bydgoszczy (1619-1780). Kronika Bydgoska XXX, 2008. Bydgoszcz: Towarzystwo Miłośników Miasta Bydgoszczy.
- Parucka, Krystyna (2008). Zabytki Bydgoszczy – minikatalog (in Polish). Bydgoszcz: Tifen. ISBN 8392719107.
