= Krzysztof Włodarczyk (bishop) =

Polish Catholic bishop (born 1961)

- Bishop of Bydgoszcz
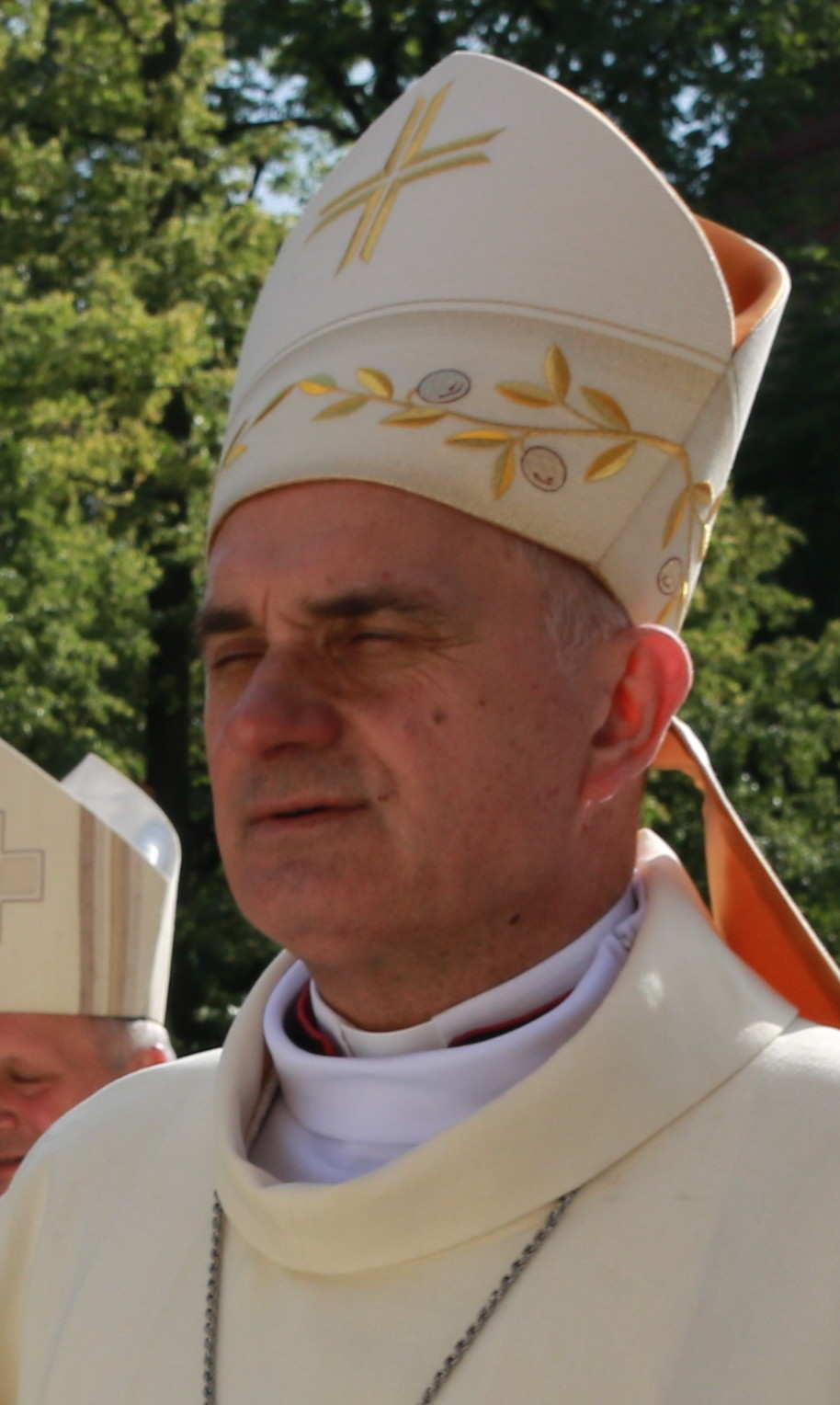
- Church: Roman Catholic
- Diocese: Bydgoszcz

Orders
- Ordination: 21 June 1987 by Ignacy Jeż
- Consecration: 7 May 2016

Personal details
- Born: Krzysztof Stefan Włodarczyk; 25 February 1961 (age 65) Sławno, Poland
- Education: Adam Mickiewicz University; Cardinal Stefan Wyszyński University in Warsaw
- Motto: Łaska, miłosierdzie, pokój
- Coat of arms

Krzysztof Stefan Włodarczyk (born 25 February 1961) is a Polish Roman Catholic bishop. He was Bishop of the Diocese of Koszalin-Kołobrzeg between 2016 and 2021 and of the Diocese of Bydgoszcz since 2021.

== Life ==
Krzysztof was born on 25 February 1961 in Sławno. He graduated from the local high school, matriculating to university in 1981. He would study at the Greater Theological Seminary in Gościkowie-Paradyżu and at the Greater Theological Seminary in Koszalin. He was made a deacon on 22 June 1986 at Kołobrzeg Cathedral by the Auxiliary Bishop of Koszalin-Kołobrzeg, Tadeusz Werno, and was ordained a priest on 21 June 1987 at St. Mary's Church in Szczecinek by Tadeusz's successor, Ignacy Jeż. Between 1993 and 1996, he studied theology at the Adam Mickiewicz University in Poznań. In 2005, he graduated from Cardinal Stefan Wyszyński University in Warsaw with a doctorate in pastoral theology; his dissertation was Model duchowości małżeńskiej i rodzinnej we współczesnych ruchach rodzinnych w Polsce.

Between 1987 and 1988, Krzysztof was a vicar at the Church of Our Lady of Częstochowa in Lipiu; the following year, he was made director of the Diocesan Retreat House in Ilowiec, with orders to reorganize the retreat house. This would fail due to difficulties in acquiring the property from the diocese. Between 1989 and 1998, he was director of the Diocesan Retreat House in Koszalin, and from 2000 to 2005 was vital in the construction of the Education and Formation Centre, also located in Koszalin. From 1990 to 2005, Krzysztof was the diocesan pastor of families, and later on, between 1996 and 2003, was an assistant for the Church of the Children of God's Grace in Lipiu. In 1998, he assumed the positions of diocesan moderator for domestic church and the diocesan pastor of sobriety.

In 1993, Krzysztof became a judge of the bishop's court in Koszalin; he would also hold the position of vice-chancellor of the Greater Theological Seminary in Koszalin between 2006 and 2007. In 2002, he was made a canon and chaplain to Pope Benedict XVI. In 2007, he would take over the position of director for care of the diocesan curia. In 2008, he was appointed director for coordination of the Foundation Work of the New Millennium.

On 7 May 2016, Pope Francis appointed him to be Auxiliary Bishop of the Diocese of Koszalin-Kołobrzeg and Titular Bishop of Surista; he would be consecrated on 11 June 2016 within Kołobrzeg Cathedral. He chose as his episcopal motto "Łaska, miłosierdzie, pokój" (English: Grace, mercy, peace), which begins 1 and 2 Timothy.

On 21 September 2021, Pope Francis appointed Krzysztof as Bishop of the Diocese of Bydogszcz.
