= Heinrich Friedrich von Diez =

German diplomat and orientalist (1751–1817)

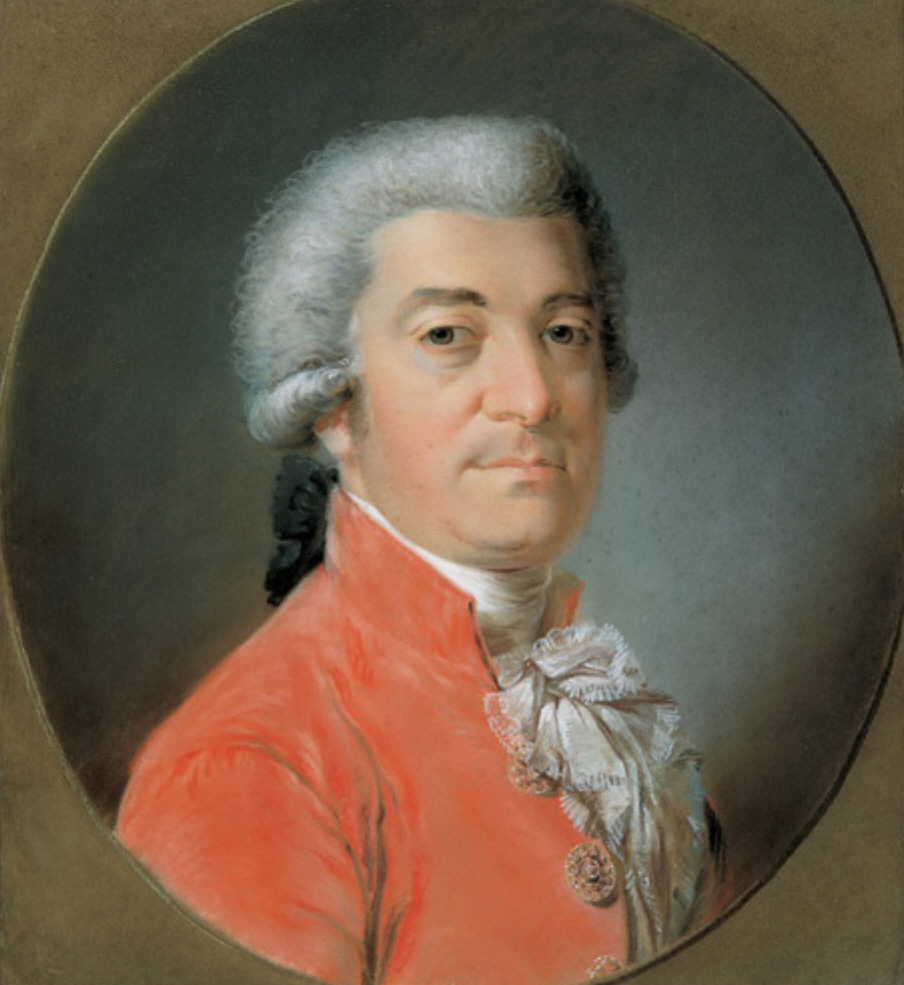
- 1791 portrait
- Born: Heinrich Friedrich Diez; September 2, 1751; Bernburg, Anhalt-Bernburg, Holy Roman Empire
- Died: April 7, 1817 (aged 65); Berlin, Kingdom of Prussia
- Father: Christian Friedrich Diez
- Mother: Maria Elisabeth Zollicoffer
- Occupation: diplomat, orientalist

Heinrich Friedrich von Diez (2 September 1751 – 7 April 1817) was a German diplomat and orientalist. He was ennobled in 1789 by Frederick the Great for his diplomatic service as the Prussian chargé d'affaires to the Ottoman Empire. In his later life he served as a benefice of the Co-Cathedral Basilica of the Assumption, Kołobrzeg, which helped fund his research.

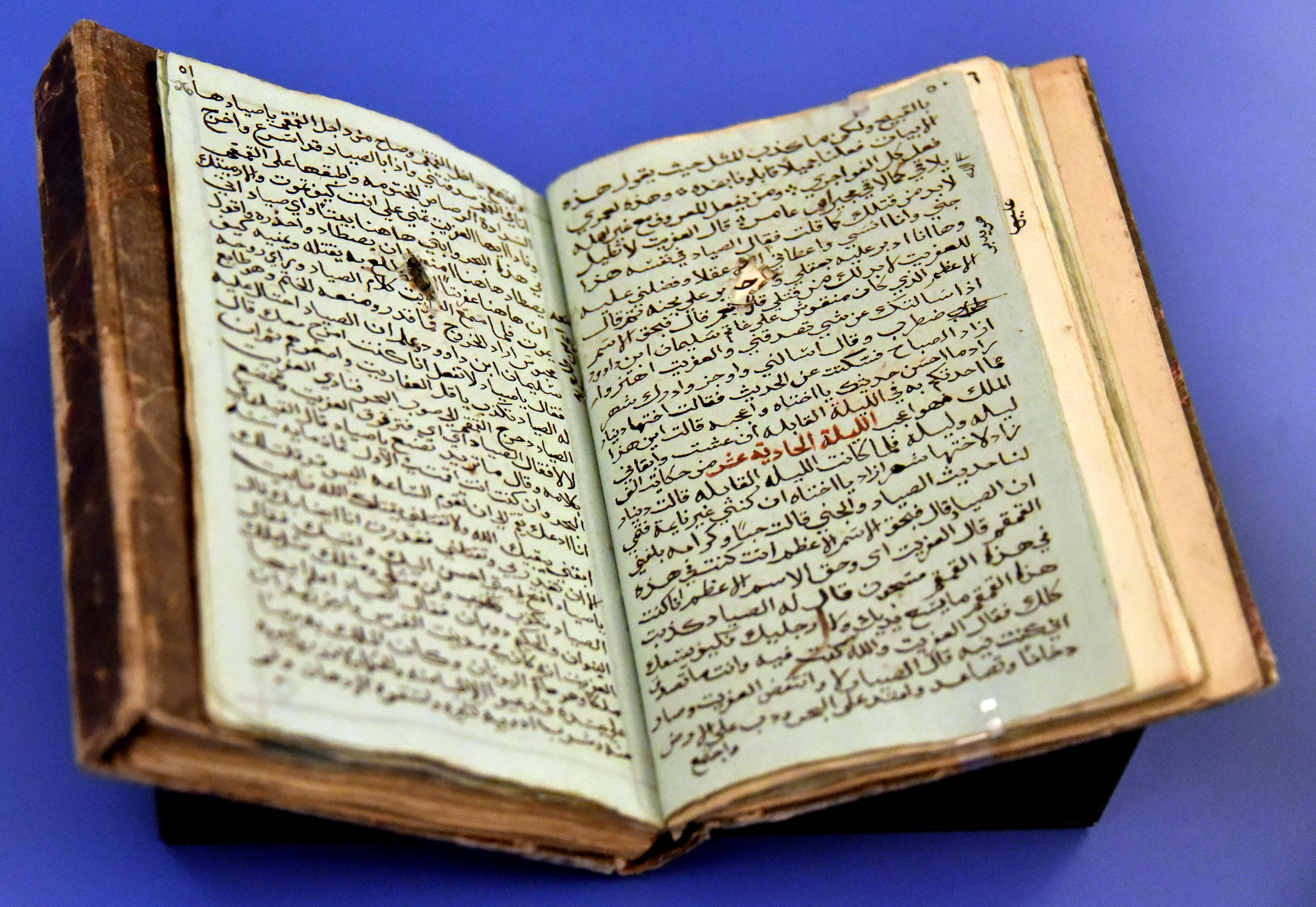
Arabic manuscript with parts of the Arabian Nights, collected by Heinrich Friedrich von Diez, 19th century CE, origin unknown

== Biography ==
Diez was born on 2 September 1751 in Bernburg, Anhalt-Bernburg. His father, Christian Friedrich Diez, was a textile merchant from Bernburg. His mother, Maria Elisabeth Zollicoffer, was from Magdeburg, Kingdom of Prussia. His family moved from Bernburg to Magdeburg shortly after his birth. He attended school in Magdeburg before studying law in 1769. Upon finishing his education, he practiced as a junior lawyer in the Prussian judicial service and was appointed Clerk of the Court.

After working in the civil service for a few years, in 1784 he asked Frederick the Great for a diplomatic position in Constantinople. The emperor granted him his request and appointed Diez as the Prussian chargé d'affaires to the Ottoman Empire. He served in this capacity at the Topkapı Palace from 1786 until 1790. As a diplomat, he signed into action a formal alliance between the Ottomans and the Prussians on 31 January 1790. He was elevated to the nobility, as a reward for his diplomatic service, in 1786. Upon being ennobled, he was granted the right to include the nobiliary particle "von" in his surname. He continued to serve in Constantinople as the Secret Legation Council until 1791, when he was dismissed due to the Russo-Turkish War. He moved to Berlin where he worked with the Ottoman special envoy Ahmed Azmi Efendi. He left later that year and moved to Kolberg, staying there until 1807, where he served as a benefice of the Cathedral of the Assumption. He was able to fund his own scientific and anthropological research, as well as a lavish lifestyle and material independence, due to his role as a benefice.

In his later life he was a private scholar and free thinker, collecting books, Persian paintings, and artifacts in his villa overlooking the Spree near Berlin. As an intellectual, he was associated with Johann Wolfgang von Goethe, August Tholuck, and Johann Wilhelm Ludwig Gleim and wrote various works on Eastern culture. He was made an honorary member of the Prussian Academy of Sciences in 1814 and an external member of the Göttingen Academy of Sciences in 1816.

Diez died on 7 April 1817, leaving behind a large fortune and a library of over 17,000 books, which he bequeathed to the Prussian State Library and the Berlin Cathedral.
