= Diocese of Bydgoszcz =

Roman Catholic diocese in Poland

Coordinates: 53.1229°N 17.9991°E

Diocese of Bydgoszcz Dioecesis Bydgostiensis Diecezja Bydgoska

Catholic
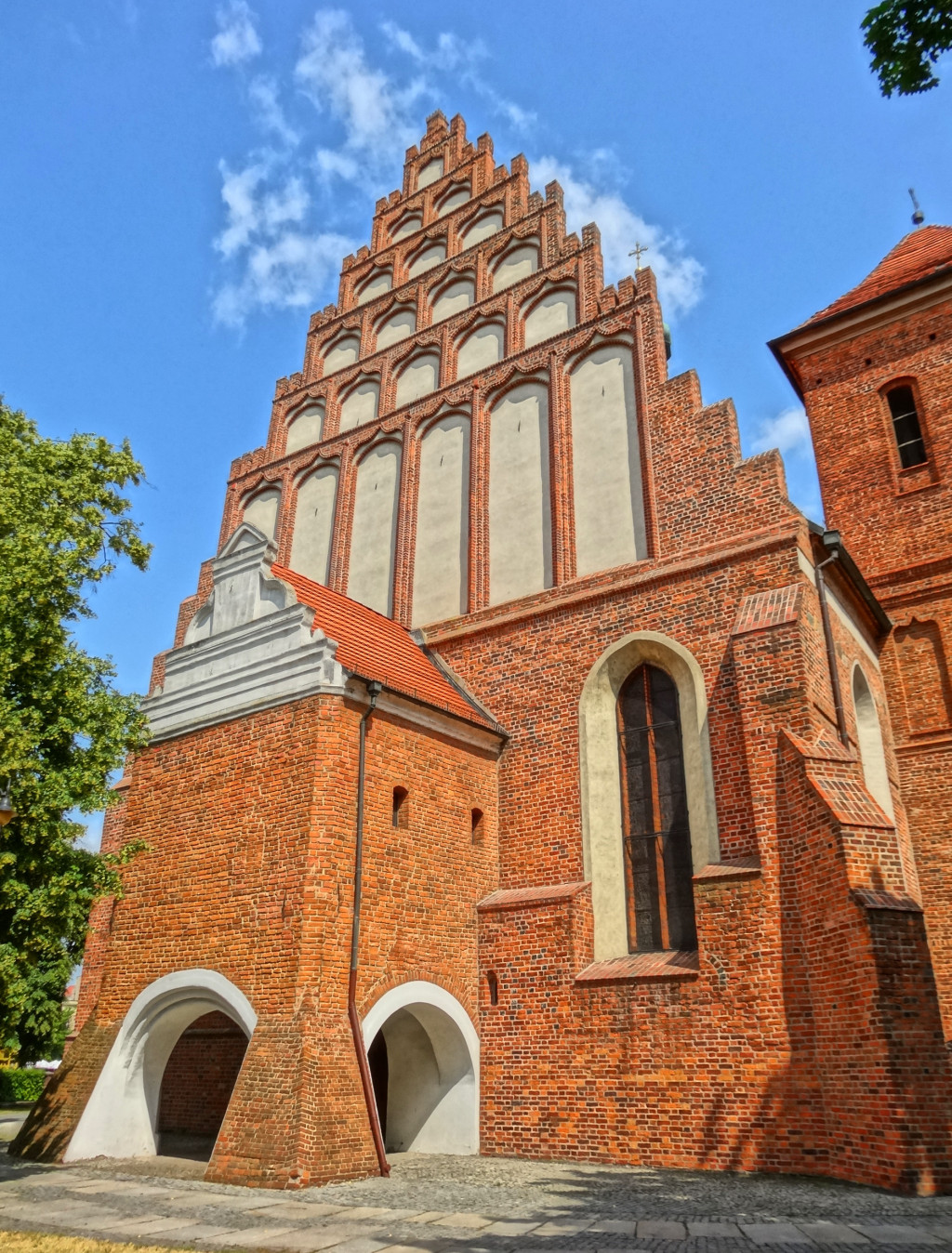
- Cathedral of St. Martin and St. Nicholas in Bydgoszcz

Location
- Country: Poland
- Metropolitan: Gniezno

Statistics
- Area: 4,000 km^{2} (1,500 sq mi)
- Population: Total; Catholics: (as of 2020); 622,036; 583,088 (93.7%)

Information
- Denomination: Catholic Church
- Rite: Latin Rite
- Cathedral: Cathedral of St. Martin and St. Nicholas in Bydgoszcz

Current leadership
- Pope: Leo XIV
- Bishop: Krzysztof Włodarczyk
- Metropolitan Archbishop: Wojciech Polak
- Bishops emeritus: Jan Tyrawa

Map

Website
- Website of the Diocese

The Diocese of Bydgoszcz (Latin: Dioecesis Bydgostiensis) is a Latin Church ecclesiastical territory or diocese of the Catholic Church located in the city of Bydgoszcz in the ecclesiastical province of Gniezno in Poland.

== History ==
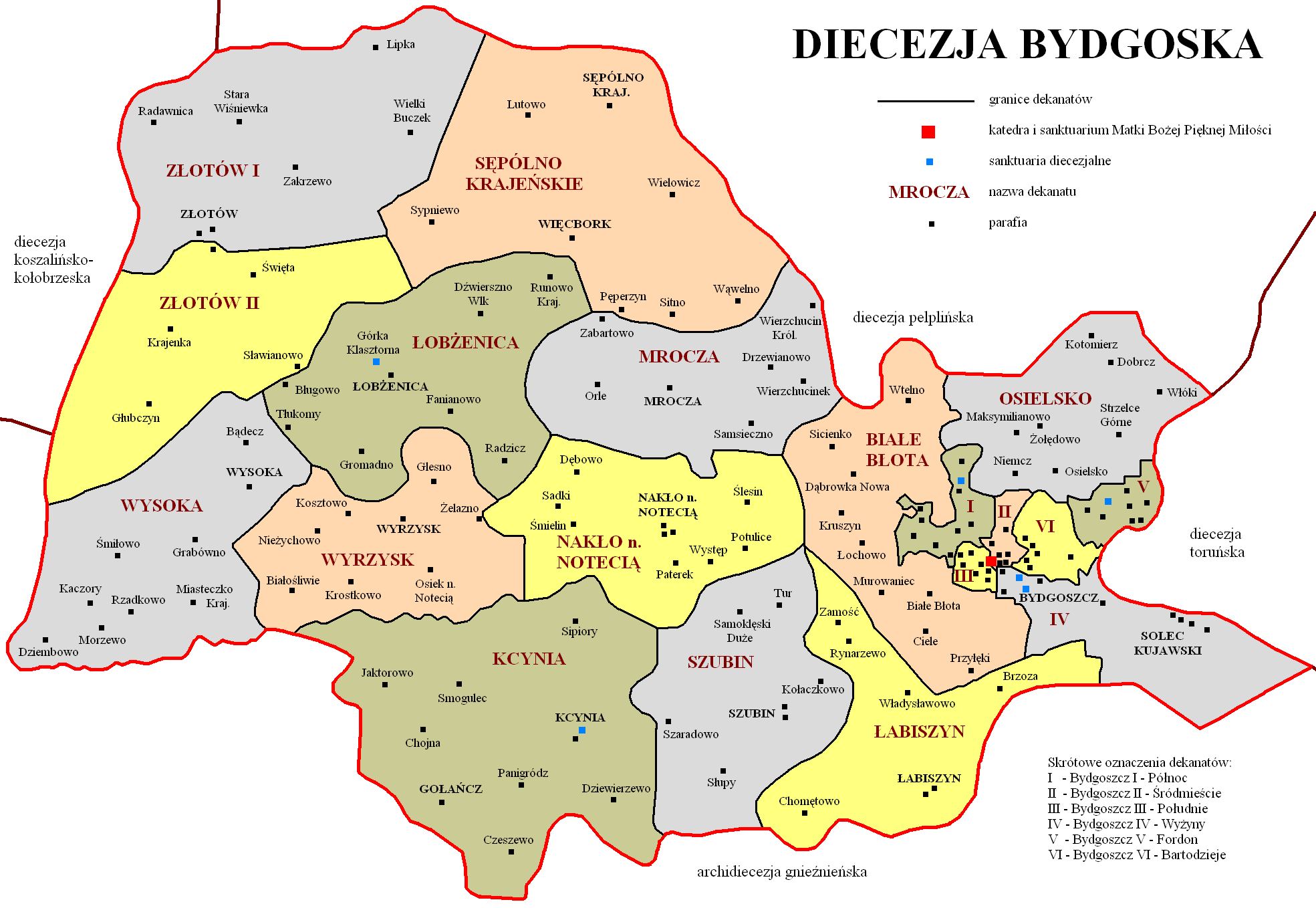
Administrative division of the Diocese of Bydgoszcz

- 24 February 2004: Established as Diocese of Bydgoscz

== Bishops ==
- Jan Tyrawa (24 February 2004 – 12 May 2021)
- Krzysztof Włodarczyk (21 September 2021 – present)

== See also ==
- Roman Catholicism in Poland

== Sources ==
- GCatholic.org
- Catholic Hierarchy
- Diocese website
