= Kołobrzeg Cathedral =

Coordinates: 54.1762°N 15.5749°E

The Co-Cathedral Basilica of the Assumption of the Blessed Virgin Mary
- Bazylika Konkatedralna Wniebowzięcia Najświętszej Maryi Panny
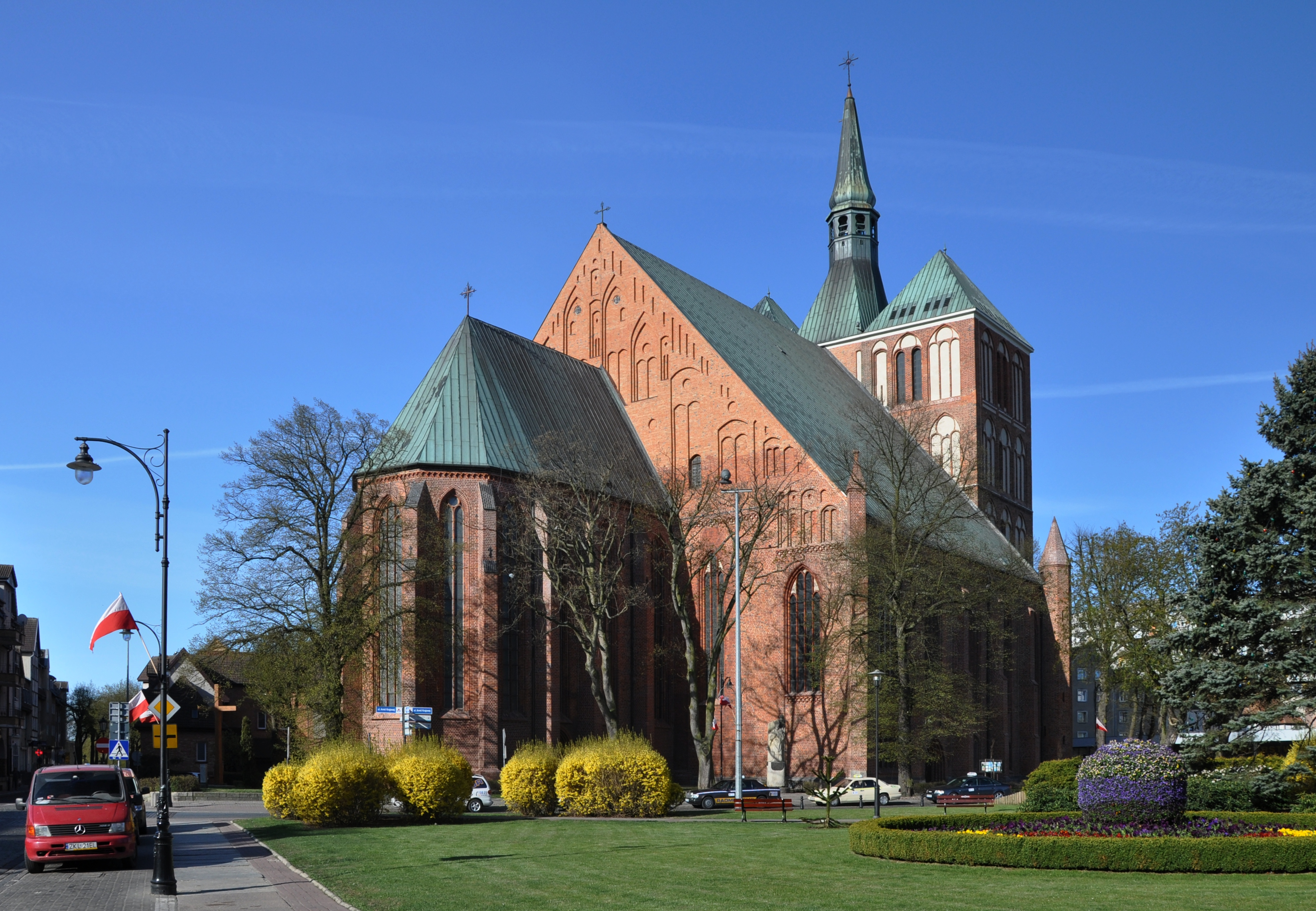
- The Co-Cathedral Basilica of the Assumption of the Blessed Virgin Mary
- Location: Kołobrzeg
- Country: Poland
- Denomination: Roman Catholic Church

The Co-Cathedral Basilica of the Assumption of the Blessed Virgin Mary (Polish: Bazylika konkatedralna Wniebowzięcia Najświętszej Maryi Panny w Kołobrzegu) also called Kołobrzeg Cathedral is a religious building of the Catholic Church which is located in the city of Kołobrzeg in Poland.

It is a temple built in the fourteenth century in the Gothic style, which has five naves. It has the status of parish church, minor basilica and since 1972 is the co-cathedral of the Diocese of Koszalin-Kołobrzeg (Dioecesis Coslinensis-Colubreganus or Diecezja koszalińsko-kołobrzeska).

== History ==
The start date of the construction of the parish church of the Virgin Mary in Kołobrzeg is not precisely known. It is believed that the main church of the city was built in the early fourteenth century on the site where once was an ancient church dedicated to St. Nicholas. The first mass in the edifice was held in the year 1321. From the sixteenth century it was a Protestant church.

In 1945, during the battle of Kołobrzeg fortress of World War II it was an important point for the defence of the city. It was destroyed by Soviet artillery. In 1957 it was handed over to the Catholic Church and reconstruction started.

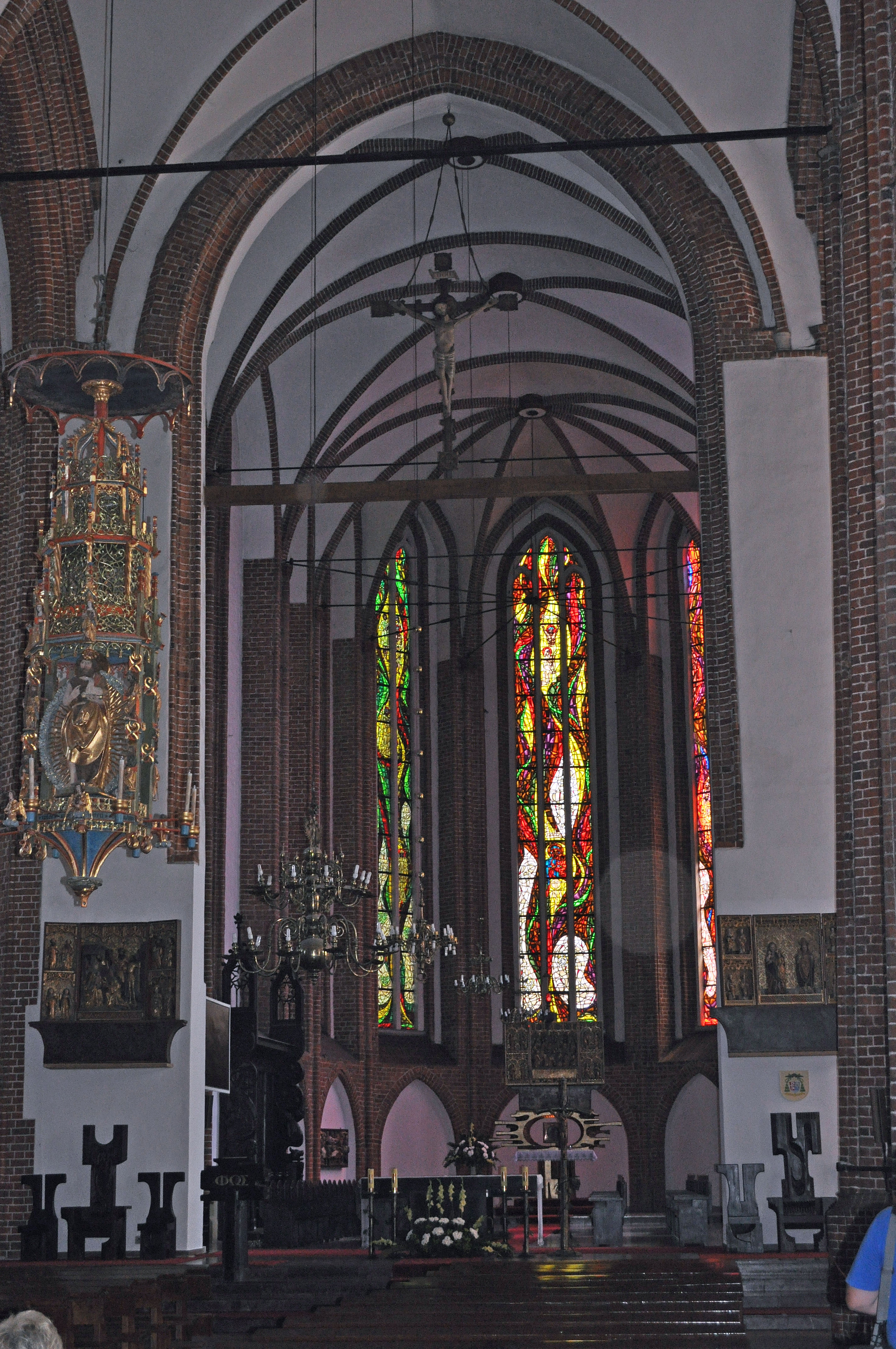
Internal view

== See also ==
- Roman Catholicism in Poland
- Assumption Cathedral (disambiguation)
