= Old Market Square, Bydgoszcz =

Place, Bydgoszcz, Poland, 14th century

Coordinates: 53°7′16″N 17°59′58″E

Old Market square
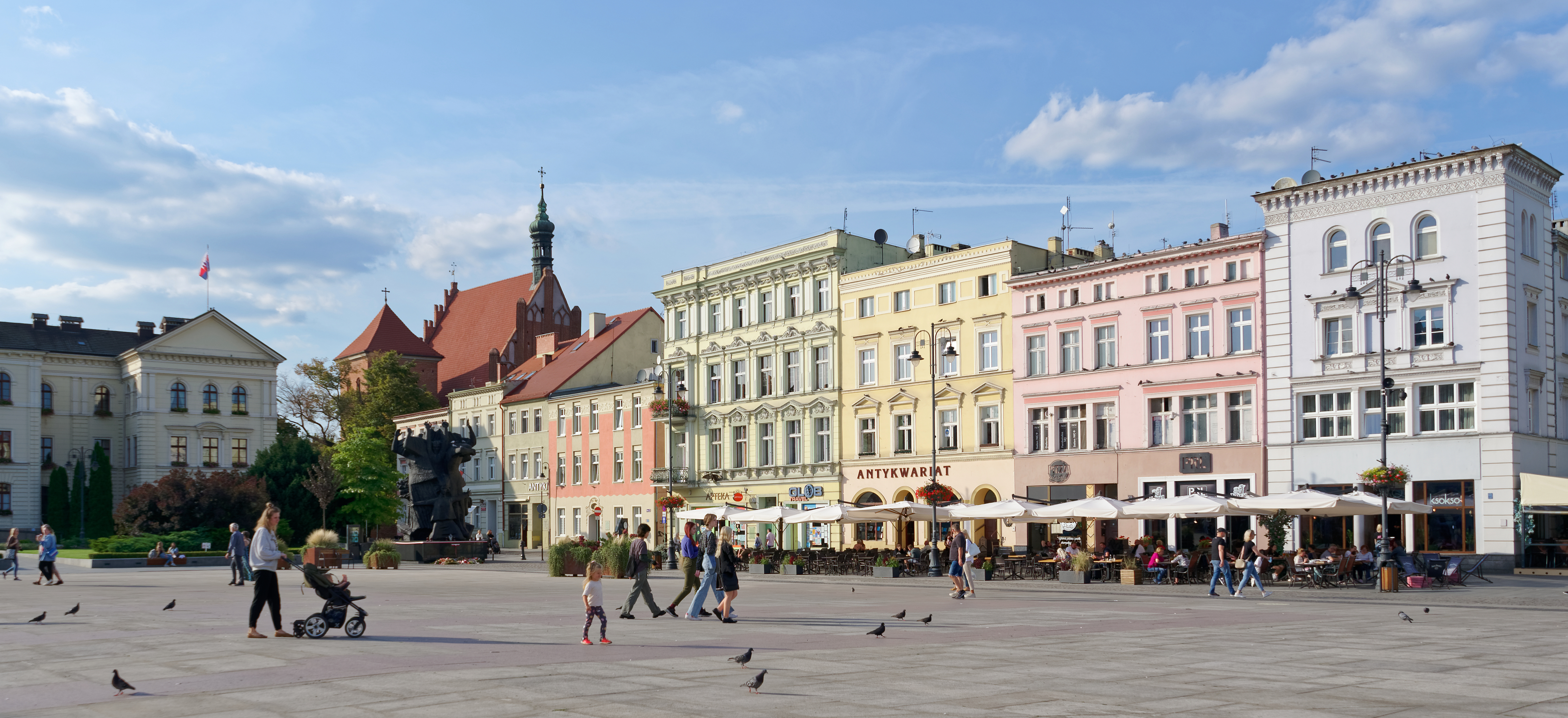
- Bird eye view of Old Market square, Bydgoszcz

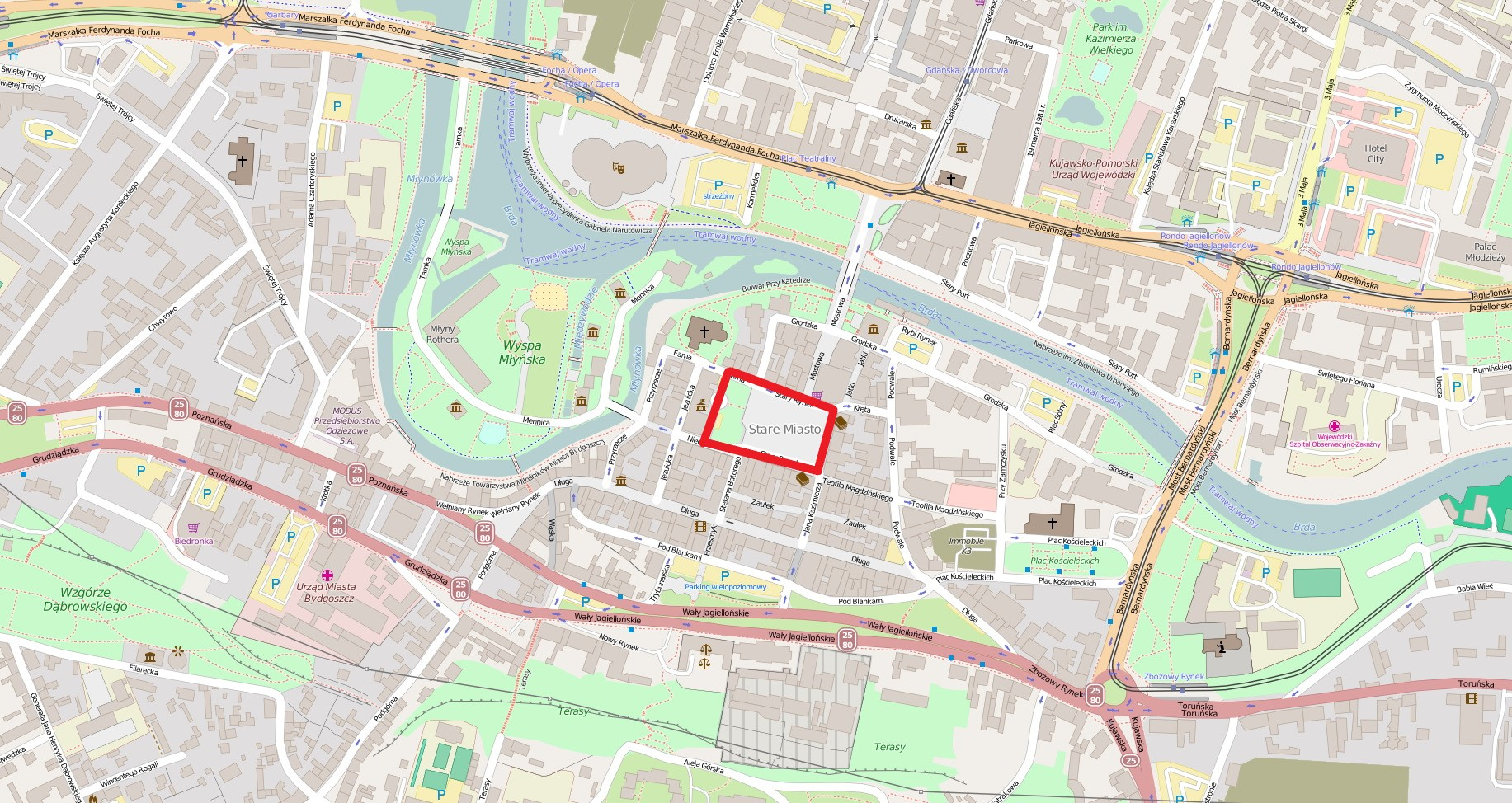
- Location of Old Market Square
- Native name: Stary Rynek (Polish)
- Former names: Markt (Hauptmarkt), Friedrichs-Platz, Rynek Marszałka J. Piłsudskiego, General-von-Kluge-Platz, Plac Bohaterów Stalingradu
- Type: Square
- Owner: City of Bydgoszcz
- Location: Downtown Bydgoszcz, Poland

Construction
- Inauguration: 1346

Bydgoszcz Old Market square is an oblong place (about 100 by 125 metres (328 ft × 410 ft)), situated in the old town district of the city of Bydgoszcz. The City Hall flanks one of its side, and nearby is located St. Martin and St. Nicholas Cathedral.

== Location ==
The Old Market square marks the center of Bydgoszcz, a Polish city established in 1346 by king Casimir III the Great. The place faces watercourses on both of its flanks:

- Brda (river) river, 100 m from its northern frontage;
- a leat channel (Polish: Młynówka), originally dug to power mills (Młyn in polish), running 150 m from its western frontage.

Quaint and historic streets stem from this square:

- Northbound towards Grodzka street and Brda river: Mostowa street and Father Tadeusz Malczewski street;
- Eastbound towards Podwale Street: Kręta street and Teofil Magdziński street;
- Southbound towards Długa street: John II Kazimierz street and Stephen Báthory street;
- Westward towards' Jezuicka Street: Niedźwiedzia street and Farna Street.

== History ==
Bydgoszcz market place has been charted in 1346, then paved in 1604. Until the end of the 17th century, court judgments were carried out there in public. It was the administrative and commercial heart of the city until the beginning of the 20th century, where Bydgoszcz economic, cultural and social life teemed. The market and the rim of properties located around constituted the core of the nascent city. Further expansion followed with plots built along Jezuicka or Długa streets.

=== Elements from excavations ===
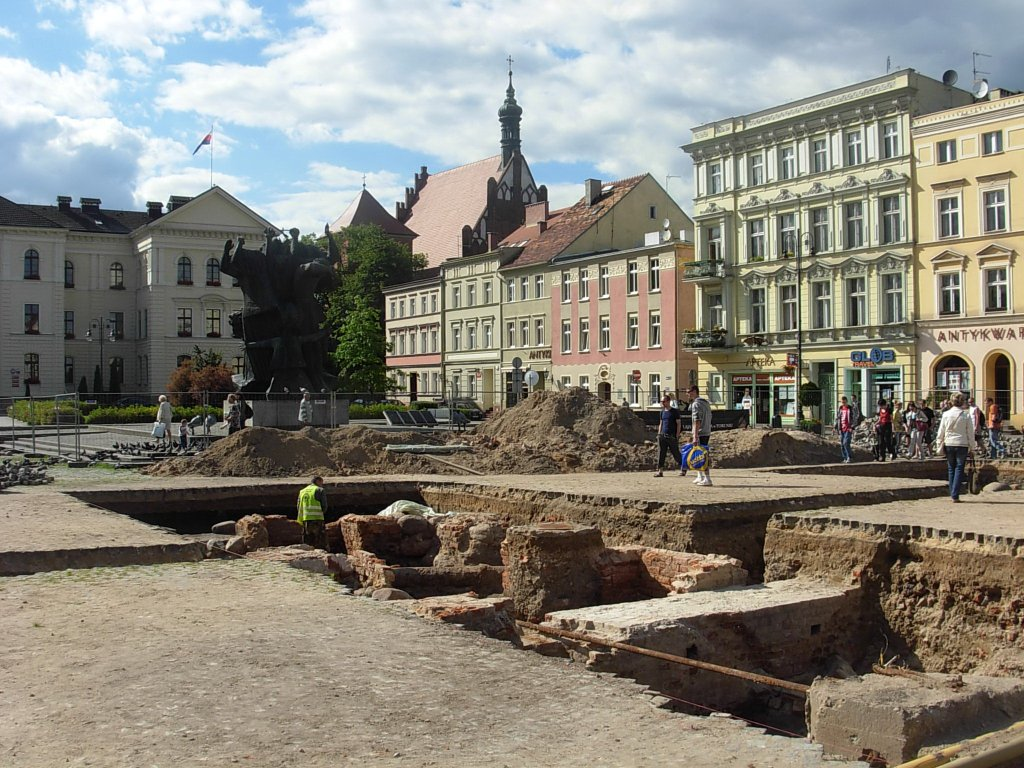
Relics of the former Town Hall

Archaeological diggings carried out in the area of the place unearthed early Middle Ages artefacts, indicating that the area was inhabited before Bydgoszcz establishment. Oldest items, dating back to pre-settlement, have been found in the north-east corner of the Old Market Square: ceramics from the 12th century and beginning of the 13th century. Objects from the Lusatian culture (pottery fragments) have even been recorded below the early medieval layer, in several locations around the place.

Another excavation, performed in 1969, exhumed relics of St. Ignatius of Loyola Jesuit Church, located on the western flank and demolished in 1940: fragments of wooden buildings, a wooden well originally located in the courtyard edifice, along with large amounts of clay and glass vessel fragments.

Diggings at the southern frontage of the square unveiled fragments of wooden pipes running along north–south and northeast–southwest directions.

During an excavation running through the middle of the place, elements of the foundations of the former Old Town Hall have been found.

Most interesting discoveries were made during a 2010 archaeological campaign, realized prior to the launching of reconstructions linked to Bydgoszcz Urban Revitalization Plan. These excavations unveiled well-preserved foundations of the former gothic town hall (e.g. vaulted cellars) once standing in the middle of Old Market square, basements of the town hall tower and merchant stalls. In addition, traces of settlement dating back to the 12th century and elements of Iron Age Pomeranian culture period have been found.

=== Jagiellonian period (1346–1772) ===
The original buildings of the Market Square were made of wood. Residential brick buildings do not appear before the 15th century. The Gothic brick edifices from the end of the 15th century were expanded with Baroque features in the 17th century and rebuilt at the beginning of the 20th century with Eclectic and Art Nouveau façades. The oldest element preserved in the vicinity of the Market Square can be found at the back of the house at Farna Street 6: it is a stone tablet with a Latin carving, displaying the date (1593) of the building and the initials of the owner -Bartosz Krąpiewski-, city councilor and mayor of Bydgoszcz between 1599 and 1603.

Presumably, the first town hall, made of wood, was built in the 14th century at the centre of the market place. During the following century, it was replaced by a Gothic brick edifice. After its burning in 1511, a construction of a new town hall started, according to the design of master Jan from Gdańsk. It was completed around 1600, and featured a Renaissance high building with a tower, which was the pride of the city.

Documented sources report the start of a construction in 1523 of a water supply network in the city, thoroughly modernized after 1541 by pipe-master Walenty from Bochnia. Wooden pipes were laid on the surface of the Market place and four public water wells built, probably connected with waterworks. During the second part of the 17th century, together with the downturn and depopulation of Bydgoszcz, the water supply network was neglected, but it partially fulfilled its role until the 19th century.

At the beginning of the 17th century, at its heyday before the Polish partitions period, chronicler Wojciech Łochowski described Bydgoszcz as follows: "The whole city is girdled by a wall, there is a high tower at the forefront of the market, from 1600, neatly set, and the town hall is decorated with brick. Brick houses, tiled roofs and water splashes compose the neatly decorated market".

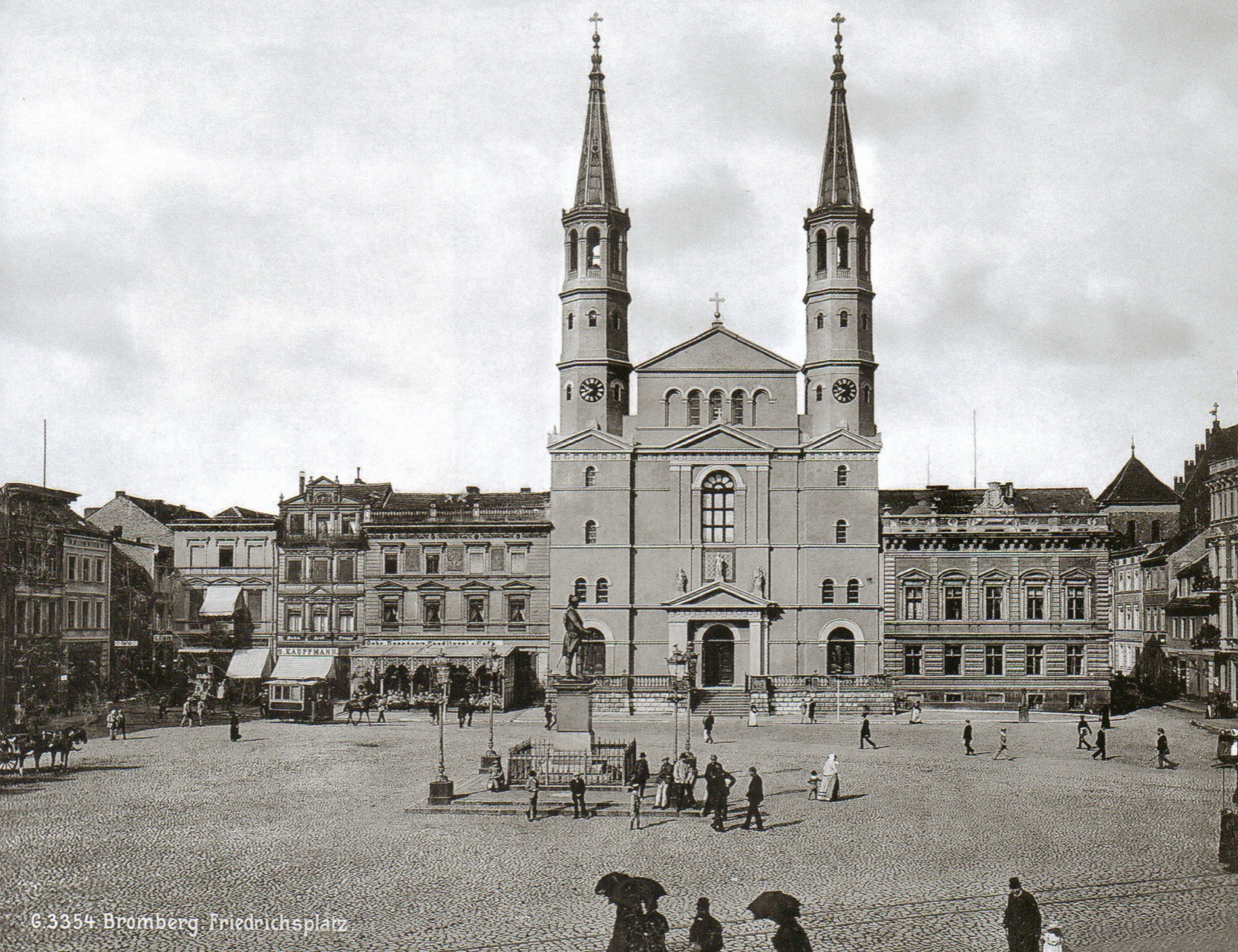
St. Ignatius of Loyola Church, ca 1895

In 1617, a permanent community of Jesuits was established in the city, thanks to the support of inhabitants and the action of Father Jan Kuczborski, Bishop of Chełmno since 1614. They received ownership of several tenements standing at the Market Square, where they rebuilt a residence and a school. Thanks to many funding (Bydgoszcz city council, bishop Kasper Działyński, the Polish Chancellor and Jerzy Ossoliński, Bydgoszcz Starosta), the Jesuit community expanded its facility. The area is delimited today by the Old Market Square to the east, Farna Street to the north, Jezuicka Street to the west and Niedźwiedzia Street to the south. Between 1637 and 1649, along the western frontage of current Old Market place was built the Holy Cross church, adorned with two towers in 1655 and 1695. In 1653, the residential building was completed; in 1780, it housed a high school, elevated to the rank of Jesuit College. The ensemble also featured a theater hall for cultural activities, which had been used until the Municipal Theater was created in 1814. The complex was gradually expanded and embellished throughout the 17th and 18th centuries, and became at the time the hallmark of the place and the entire city. In 1804, the church was re-consecrated as St. Ignatius of Loyola Church in Bydgoszcz.

During that period, the Old Market Square witnessed multiple visits of high-ranked Polish officials. Until 1656, those dignitaries, while in the city, stayed at the castle and the retinue rented rooms in houses downtown. Among the most famous visitors, one can cite:

- Władysław II Jagiełło;
- Casimir IV Jagiellon;
- Sigismund I the Old, who chaired the Sejm gathered in Bydgoszcz in 1520;
- Stephen Báthory, who stayed three months in 1577.

From 26 October to 6 November 1657 the Jesuit college in Bydgoszcz housed negotiations between John II Casimir Vasa and the Elector of Brandenburg Frederick William, which ended with the signing of the Treaty of Bromberg on the Old Market.

At the time, the place was mainly used as a city market square, as originally designed at the establishment of Bydgoszcz in 1346. This scheme had been identical in all cities ruled by German town law, with slight variations (Magdeburg rights, Kulm law). Several fees were charged:

- fees for market trade, one of the city's sources of income during fair market;
- customs duty on salt, herring and hops, for the Starosta, the wójt (head of town) from the middle of the 17th century and for the city from 1526;
- fees for location and paving.

In the Middle Ages, Bydgoszcz market only operated on Saturdays, but in the middle of the 18th century, it stood also on Tuesdays. In addition to the market, larger commercial fairs were organized, as there were no major restrictions for external buyers. On 17 December 1484 King Casimir IV Jagiellon granted Bydgoszcz the right to organize three fairs during the year: on Saint Agnes day (21 January), on Saint Giles day (1 September) and on Saint Martin day (11 November). Sigismund II Augustus allowed a fourth fair in 1555, for the Octave of Corpus Christi. Before 1669, two more days were granted to the city: on Saint Anthony day (13 June) and Saint Francis of Assisi (on 4 October). Although in the second half of the 17th century and during the 18th century the frequency of trade events in Bydgoszcz was the largest in Poland, local activity did not reap the benefits of the situation, in that the economic decline of the city had already started.

=== Prussian partition period (1772–1920) ===
After the First Partition of Poland, Kingdom of Prussia seized Poland and Bydgoszcz, drawing up an exact inventory of the city. On a detailed map realized by geometer Greth in 1774, properties on the Market Square are, by and large, the same as those currently standing, apart from a few plots not built at the time, at the corners with Teofil Magdziński street and with Farna Street. In the last quarter of the 18th century, there was no more parcels left: on the corner with John II Casimir street was constructed a large building, dedicated to host the Netze District authorities and the Court of Appeal. The entire western frontage, formerly owned by the Jesuits, was taken over by the Prussian state. In 1788, the first artificial lighting system in the city was installed on the market, replacing superannuated street oil lamps (in 1806, there were still 97 oil lamp posts operating in Bydgoszcz).

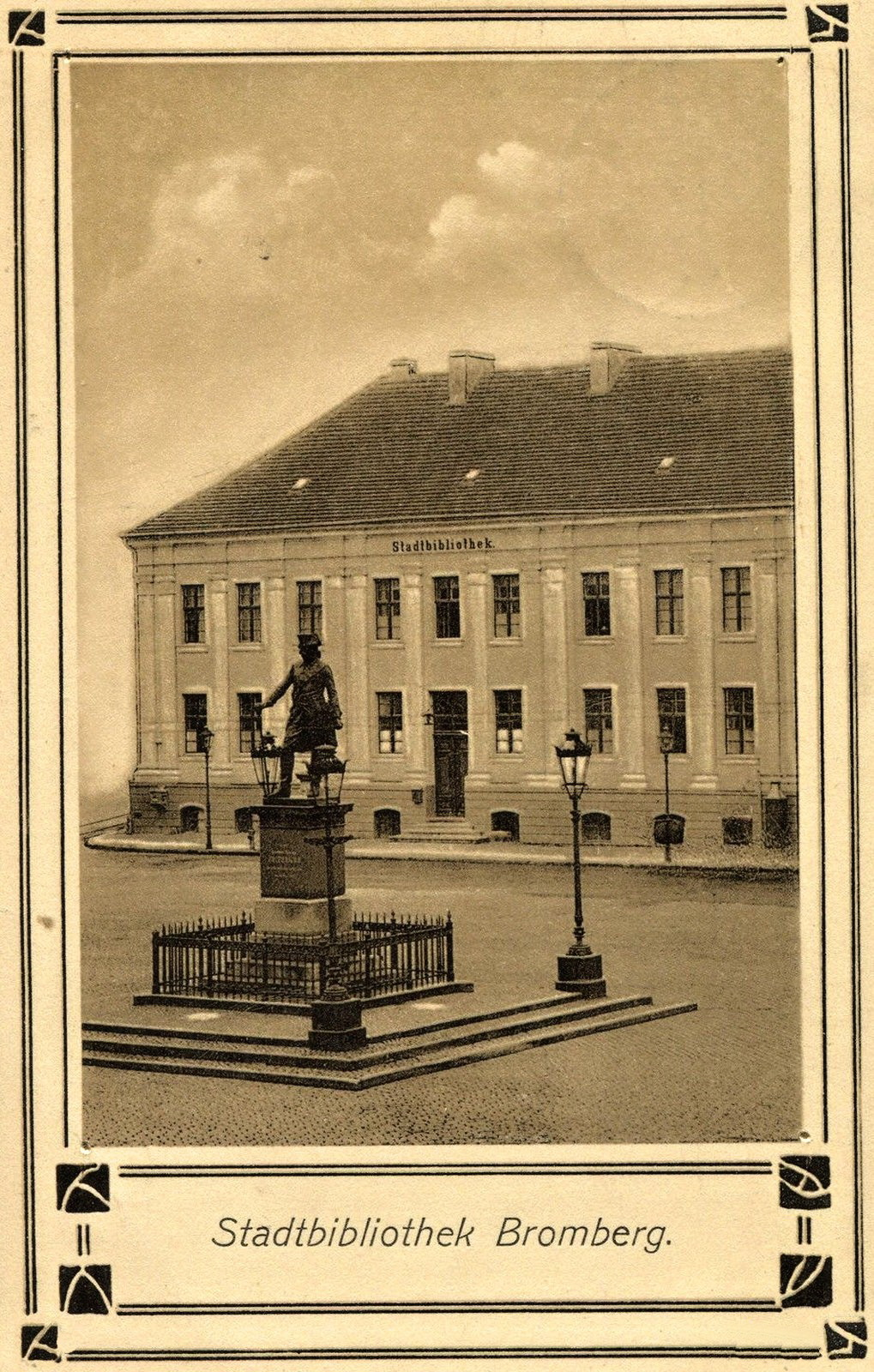
Statue to Frederick II. on the market place, 1910

At the beginning of the 19th-century (Napoleonic Wars), the Old Market Square was the location where important "political" speeches were made: on 6 December 1806 an anti-Prussian uprising was publicly proclaimed, and on 19 February 1807, a decree supporting the Duchy of Warsaw was solemnly read. Today's Provincial and Municipal Public Library building then housed the seat of Bydgoszcz Department and the ex-Jesuit college hosted the main school of the region. The Duchy of Warsaw ceased to exist in 1812, and Bydgoszcz was incorporated anew into the Kingdom of Prussia.

Between 1830 and 1834, the Prussian authorities demolished the remains of the old town hall which was standing up in the middle of the actual square: municipal offices were moved to the tenement house at Długa street 37 (today's Ratuszowy hotel). In 1817, a royal gymnasium was opened in the premises of the former Jesuit college; the high school has been relocated in 1878 to its current place at Plac Wolności. Since 1878, the mayor of Bydgoszcz has always been inhabiting the late Jesuit college building.

On an 1834 town plan, 31 individual estates were listed, 9 in the southern frontage, 5 in the western (plus the Jesuit church), 9 in the northern and 8 the eastern. In the middle of the 19th century, a new street, Jatki Street, was cut out in the north-eastern corner of the place, connecting with Grodzka Street.

On 18 June 1848, following a violent storm, the Baroque steeple of the towers on the Jesuit church were destroyed. They were initially covered with cone-shaped roofs then rebuilt with Neo-Gothic features from 1880 to 1882. At the same time, the church façade was also reconstructed.

In 1859, the city council decided to erect a monument to Frederick the Great on the Market place. At the cornerstone laying ceremony on 21 October 1861, highly distinguished guests were present, among whom the King of Prussia William I and his son the prince Frederick III, both accompanied by their wives Augusta of Saxe-Weimar-Eisenach and Victoria. The monument was unveiled in January 1862, and the event was again attended by the Prussian heir to the throne, Frederick III Hohenzollern, together with his wife Victoria. On 4 October 1909 another sculpture was unveiled on the square: Children playing with goose or The Well (Polish: Studzienka). This fountain with a well, realized by sculptor Karol Kowalczewski, has been funded by Alfred Kupffender, owner of the pharmacy "Under the Golden Eagle" (Polish: Pod Złotym Orłem), located on the north-west corner of the place.

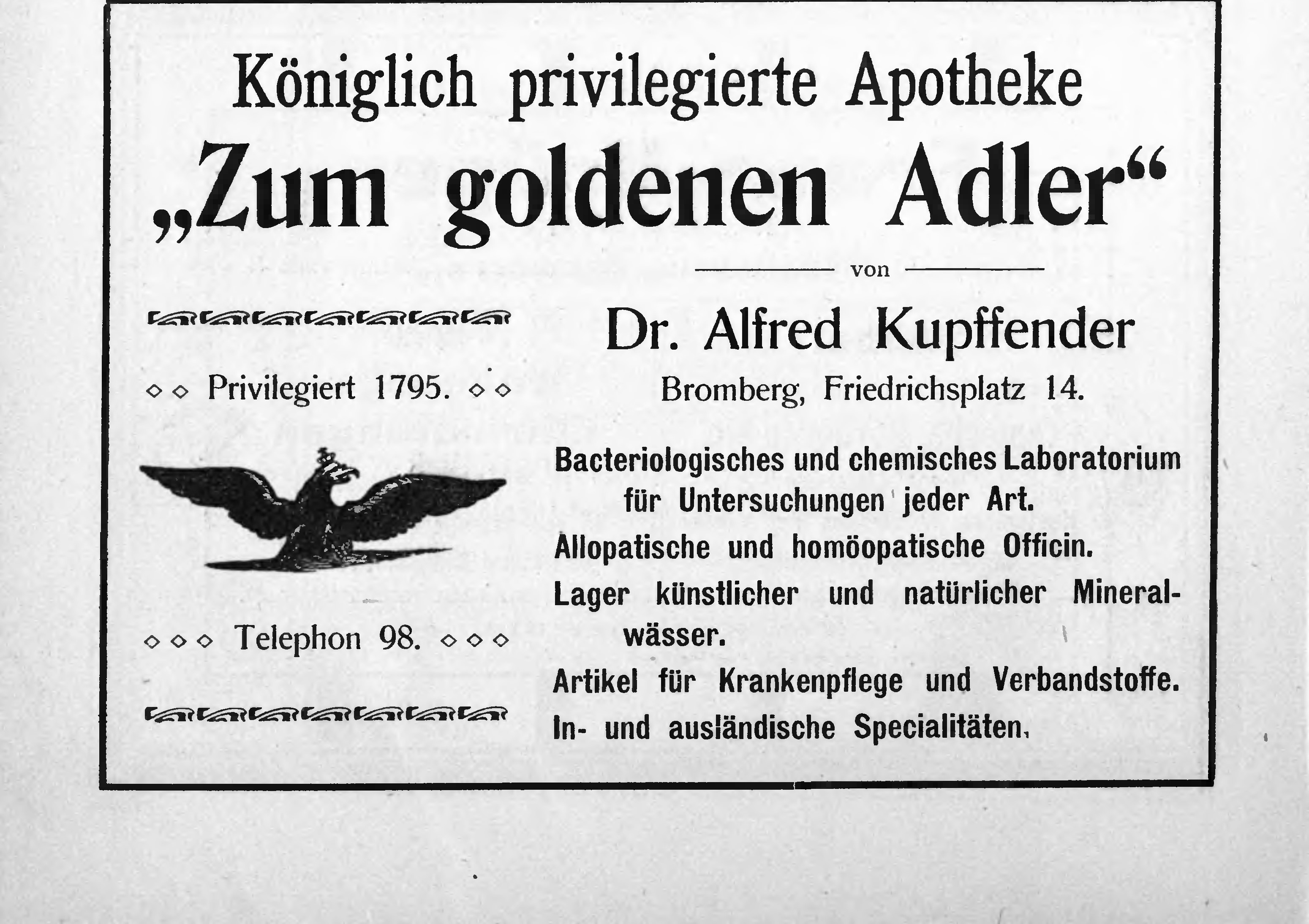
Advertising for Kupffender's pharmacy, 1903

In Prussian times, the Old Market Square was still the main municipal market area. Crowdy fairs were held there four times a year, and regular market every other week.

Through all the 19th century, a thorough reconstruction of almost all tenements of the market place was carried out, applying Neoclassical forms until the 1850s, followed by Eclectic style made of a mix of historicism elements. In the second half of the 19th century, a few houses were demolished in the northern and southern frontages, for reconstruction purposes, replaced by buildings with Neo-Renaissance facades. The same movement happened at the beginning of the 20th century, where Art Nouveau style was applied (e.g. tenement at Nr. 20).

In 1888, streetcars were stationed on the Old Market: initially horsecars, then electric trams (since 1896). Two of the three tramlines of the city were at the time passing through the place. These were: Red Line (from Bydgoszcz train station Główna to Bydgoszcz Wąskotorowa in Grunwaldzka street) and Green Line (from Gdańska Street to Strzelnica stop in Toruńska Street).

=== Interwar period (1920–1939) ===
On 20 January 1920, on the Old Market, in front of the Jesuit church, took place the ceremony celebrating the rebirth of the Polish state, 148 years after the first Prussian partition, in the presence of Polish army troops. The statue of Frederick the Great had been dismantled by German citizens and transported to neighbouring Piła at the signing of the Treaty of Versailles.

In 1923, in the house at Nr. 2 was established the Regional Museum named after Leon Wyczółkowski. Likewise, the Netze District building was converted in 1908, into the Provincial and Municipal Public Library (building at Nr. 24).

Interwar period did not bring much new changes in the aspect or the role the Old Market square. The traditional market were still held here on Tuesdays and Saturdays.

For once, changes appeared in other city places: a market was held every other day at the Old place, at the New Market Square (Polish: Nowy Rynek), at Plac Poznański and Piastowski Square. The commercial heart of Bydgoszcz then comprised the Old Market square, Gdańska Street, parts of Dworcowa Street and Theatre square, where shops and department stores were concentrated. In 1936, a new tram line ran through the Old Market Square, the D line, from Gdańska Street to Długa street.

=== Nazi occupation (1939–1945) ===
After the arrival of occupying forces, dramatic events took place on the square. In retaliation to Polish population sabotage (as called by German propaganda) perpetrated on 3 September 1939, 50 Bydgoszcz citizens were executed on 9–10 September 1939 in front of the western frontage of the Old Market Square. All these appalling actions are part of the sadly notorious Bydgoszcz's Bloody Sunday.

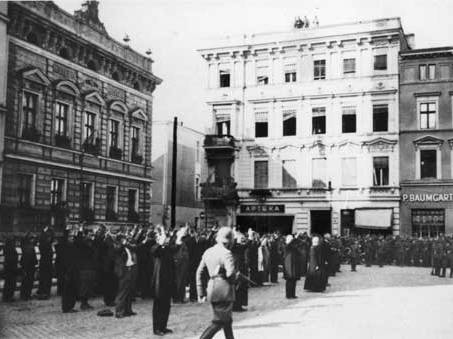
Bydgoszcz hostages mustered at the Old Market square, 1939

At the beginning of 1940, German authorities began to demolish the Jesuit church, the entire western frontage of the Old Market Square -including the tenement house hosting the regional Museum (at Nr. 2), and edifices at Mostowa street cornering the Brda river. Intended project was to build a new town hall with a National socialist style, as well as widening Mostowa street to create a parade avenue for the Wehrmacht. The church was definitely razed on 27 March and the tenement houses on 23 October 1940: in the action, the fountain-well Children playing with geese was also pulled down. However fragments of the sculpture, deposited in the city garden store, fortunately survived the period of occupation. The statue of Frederick the Great was reinstalled on 20 April 1941, Adolf Hitler's name day, and the Prussian name of the square (Friedrichs-Platz) reinstated.

In January 1945, the Old Market Square was at the centre of the combats for the liberation of Bydgoszcz: on January 24, the southern side of the city was captured by the Soviet army (76th Infantry Division) and Polish troops (1st Polish Army and 1st Armoured Brigade). The next day, fights occurred to take over the left-bank of the Brda river. Supported by a motorized company, Germans forces put up a fierce resistance along Gdańska street. Heavy exchanges of artillery fire happened across the river in the vicinity of Mostowa street: Soviet projectiles damaged the Municipal Theater at Plac Teatralny, while German artillery burned up four tenements standing in the eastern frontage of the square.

=== After 1945 ===
In January 1945, in the first days after the liberation of Bydgoszcz, the monument to Frederick the Great was dismantled and melted away. On 1 May 1948 the fountain-well was reinstalled in front of the still ruined Municipal library, while between 1953 and 1956, parts of the eastern frontage were rebuilt. However, the new authorities did not proceed to the reconstruction of the western frontage, owing to the presence of the Jesuit church which did not fit into the new political line. In 1947, markets on the place were finally liquidated, leaving the area for cultural events and demonstrations.

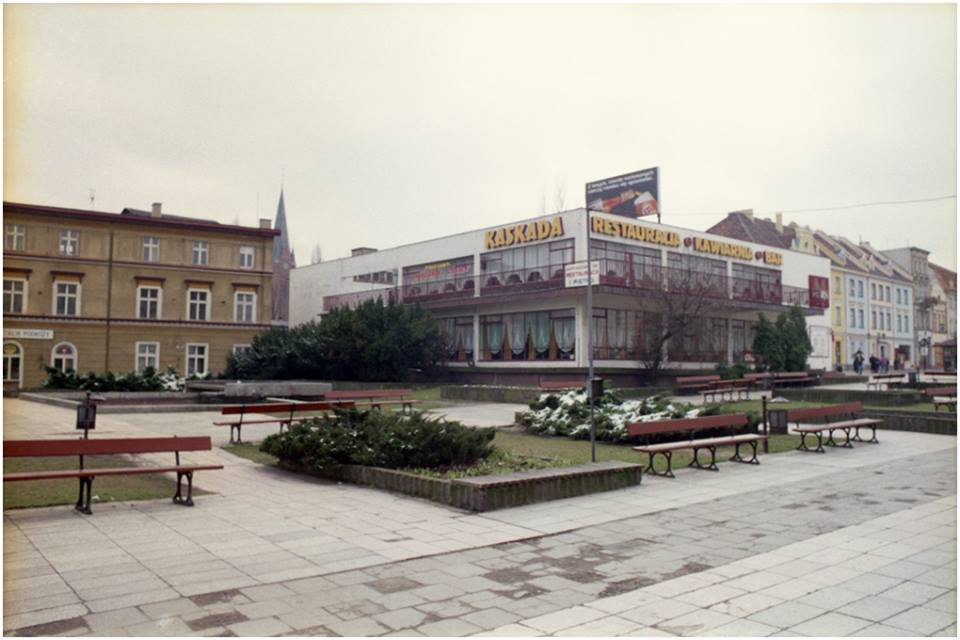
Restaurant Kaskada

In 1962, after the reconstruction of the downtown bridge over the Brda river, the tram traffic resumed through the square until 1969. Between 1968 and 1969, at the north-eastern corner, razed during the war, a functionalist pavilion hosting Kaskada, a gastronomic restaurant, was erected: its radical style caught the eye among others facades. As for the plot where the former Jesuit church used to stand, city authorities unveiled there on 5 September 1969, a monument commemorating the Struggle and Martyrdom of Bydgoszcz Land (Polish: Pomnik Walki i Męczeństwa Ziemi Bydgoskiej).

In 1974, following a ministerial resolution, a revalorization of the Old Town, including the Old Market Square, began. The project aimed at re-organizing the commercial network, the transport network layout and giving back to the shop frontages their historic outline. In the 1970s, the following achievements appeared:

- the tenement house at Nr. 16 hosted Antykwariat Naukowy, an antique shop;
- Nr. 18 accommodated a store selling crystals;
- ground floors at Nr. 20 and 22 were modernized;
- a "Salon of the Visual Arts Studio" was set up in the corner house at Nr. 27, and cellars converted into a café;
- in the cellar at Nr. 25, Cepelia salon was established.

Such changes were also implemented on the eastern frontage of the square. From 1973 to 1975, tram and vehicles were banned from the place and some outgoing streets converted into pedestrian venues (e.g. Mostowa and Magdzińskiego streets).

On 3 May 1981 bishop Jan Michalski celebrated a mass for the homeland from the stairs of the library, in front of an audience of 100.000 gathered on the Old Market Square; the reader was Daniel Olbrychski. It was the largest demonstration to support Solidarność trade union in the history of the city, and one of the largest gatherings in Bydgoszcz (the largest one being for the visit of Pope John Paul II in 1999).

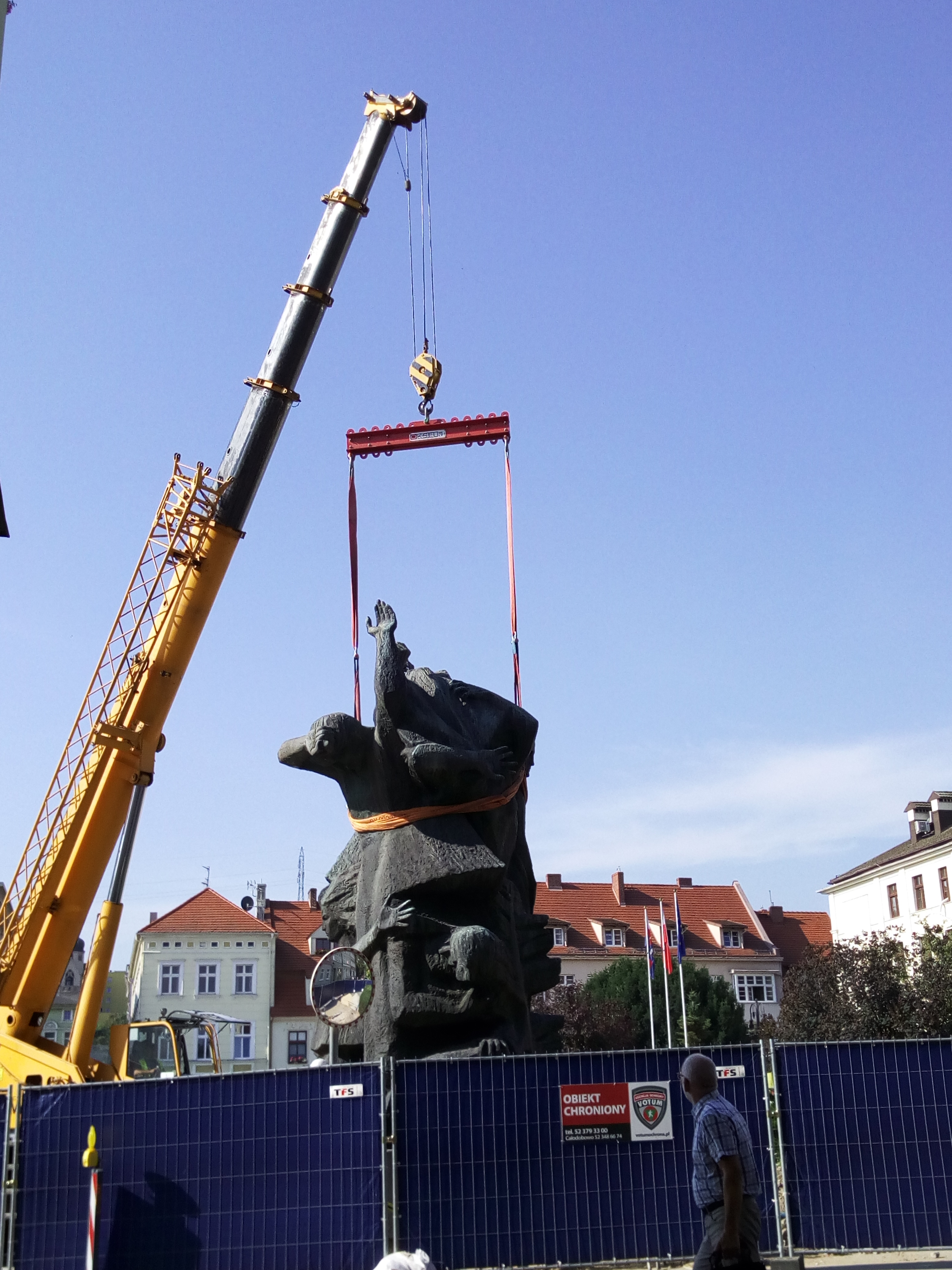
Main sculpture moved for place renovation in July 2018

After Poland's accession to European Union, a competition was held in 2010 to re-design the western side of the Market, but results did not meet public expectations. On 10 December 2011 the former gastronomic complex Kaskada was bulldozed. In 2013, the plot was reconstructed, together with Jatki Street.

In autumn 2016, archaeological research started on the square, prior to the renovation of the area. This project planned, in particular, to move the monument 15 m closer to the Bydgoszcz Cathedral, allowing the building of a 35-m long high-tech fountain. The Kuyavian-Pomeranian Voivodeship Inspector of Monuments, on the rationale of the diggings report, barred the realization of the fountain so as to preserve the foundations on the western frontage (church walls and towers, relics of tenement houses with cellar vaults) over an area of 500 m^{2}. Once the renovation is achieved, the sector will be free of car traffic.

In May 2018, the contractor which won the bid for the modernization of the Old Market Square was announced: local firm Betpol, for a budget of 14.3 million PLN. The main part of the works is to be carried out by mid-November 2018, and the project completed by mid-2019. Construction works started on 25 June 2018.

The 18° East line of longitude runs through the center of the Old Market Square. So far this geographical particular is heralded by a small obelisk set on Mill Island: it is foreseen to emphasize this fact on the pavement of the Old Market, once revitalization works are over.

=== Naming ===
Through history, this street had the following names:

- 16th–18th century, Ring (Latin: circulus fori);
- 1772–1862, Markt (Hauptmarkt);
- 1862–1920, Friedrichs-Platz;
- 1920–1929, Stary Rynek;
- 1929–1939, Stary Rynek Marshal Józef Piłsudski;
- 1939–1941, Günther von Kluge-Platz;
- 1941–1945, Friedrichs-Platz;
- 1945–1949, Stary Rynek;
- 1950–1955, Square of the heroes of Stalingrad (Polish: Plac Bohaterów Stalingradu);
- since 1956, Stary Rynek.

== Main buildings ==
=== Center part ===
Until 1834, a town hall has been standing at the middle of the market square, similar to one can see today in Gdańsk's or Poznań's main squares. In 1515, the new city hall displayed arcades housing stalls where clothes, bread were sold and under which fairs stood. The building decoration, like all city frontages, featured Renaissance style, and owned a clock tower with an alarm bell, two observation galleries and an onion dome. The edifice was standing adjacent to the city guardhouse. This important secular building of the Jagiellonian period was devastated in the 18th century and completely demolished later on by the Prussian authorities: the tower was razed in the first half of the 18th century, and the rest of the town hall between 1831 and 1834.

=== Northern frontages ===
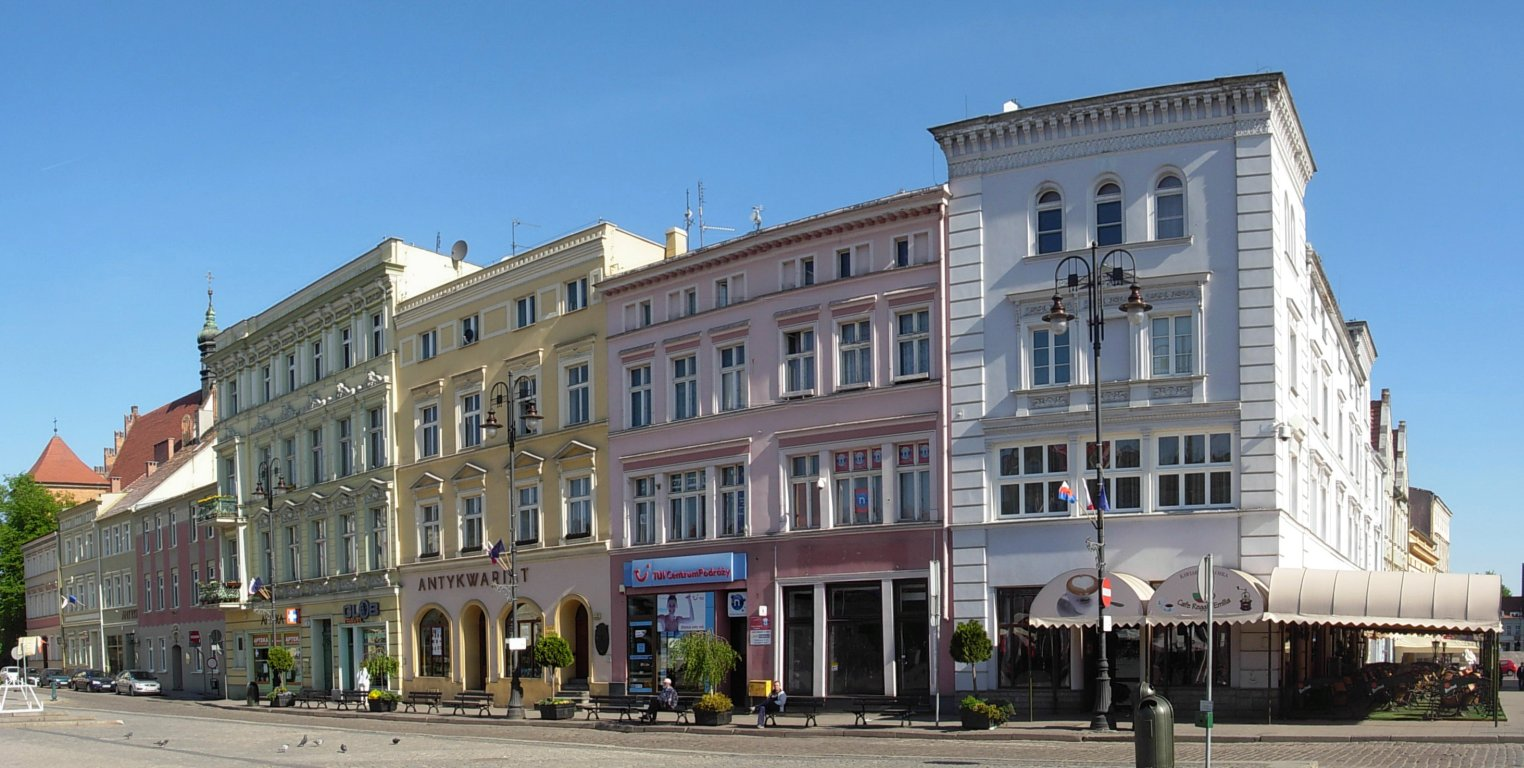
View of northern frontages (Nr.1 to 7), plus houses at Farna Street (far left)

House at 1
1780
Eclecticism and Neo-classicism

Here stands the oldest pharmacy in Bydgoszcz, Under the Golden Eagle (Polish: Pod Złotym Orłem), founded before 1590 at the Jesuit monastery. The institution was in possession of Jesuits until 1795. The pharmacy was bought in 1808 by Ludwik Kupffender, the son of the director of a local sugar factory. On 4 October 1909 Alfred Kupffender (who owned the firm until 1921), the fountain Children playing with geese in front of his plot to commemorate 100 years of family business of the pharmacy. The subject with geese is a reference to the geese-market which used to be held in front of his plot. Doctor Kupffender at the time was responsible to run analysis on the quality of the water pumped from the new city water supply station. On the facade, a plaque remembers 55 inhabitants of Bydgoszcz who were shot on 9 and 10 September 1939, at the Old Market Square.

The elevation is heavily decorated at each level. Two first floors display rows of windows topped by pediment adorned with floral motifs and coat of arms (1st floor) or a woman head (2nd floor). Both levels have a wrought iron balcony, while the last floor boasts pilasters, festoons on lintels and corbel tables capped by a frieze of rosettes.

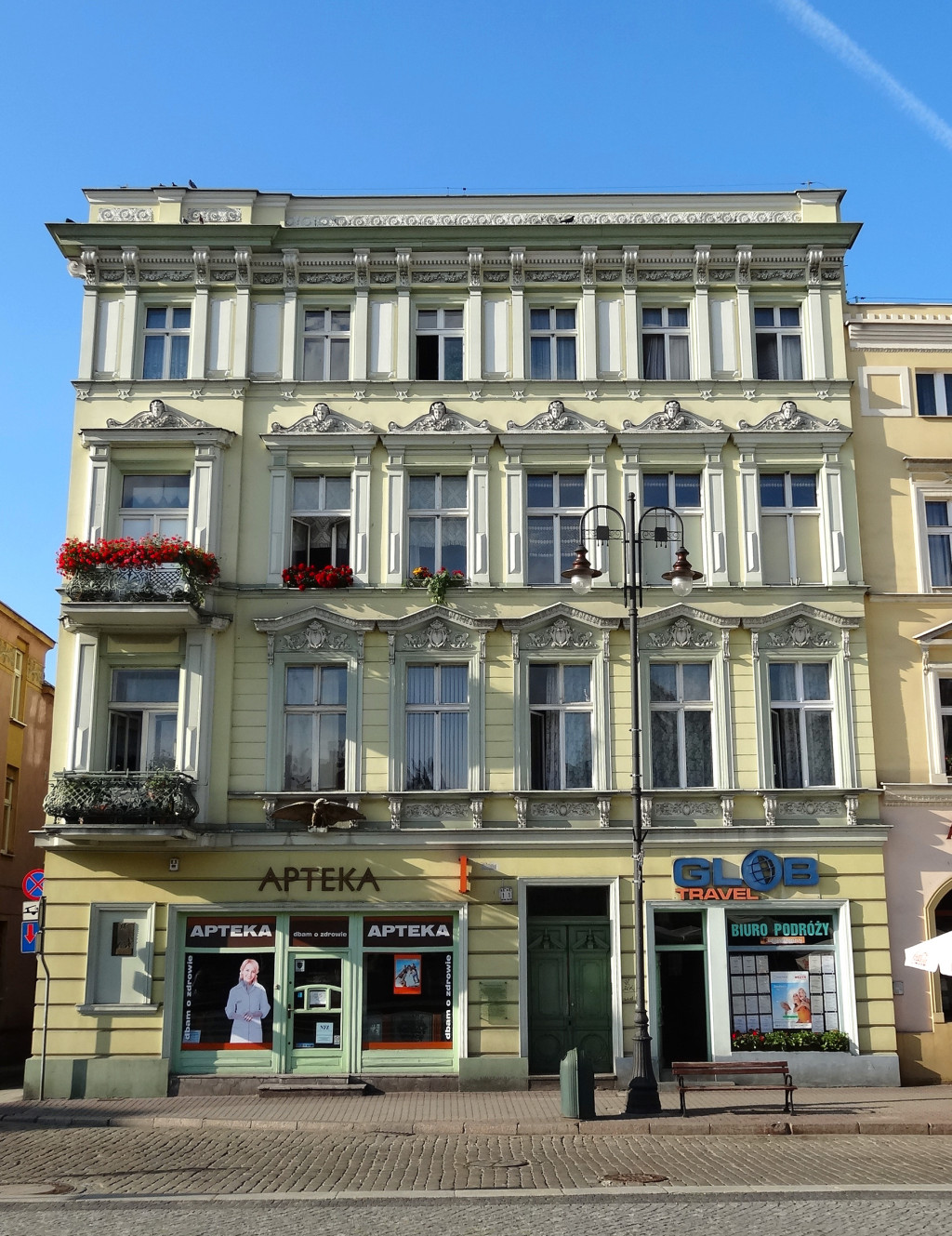
Frontage on the Market place

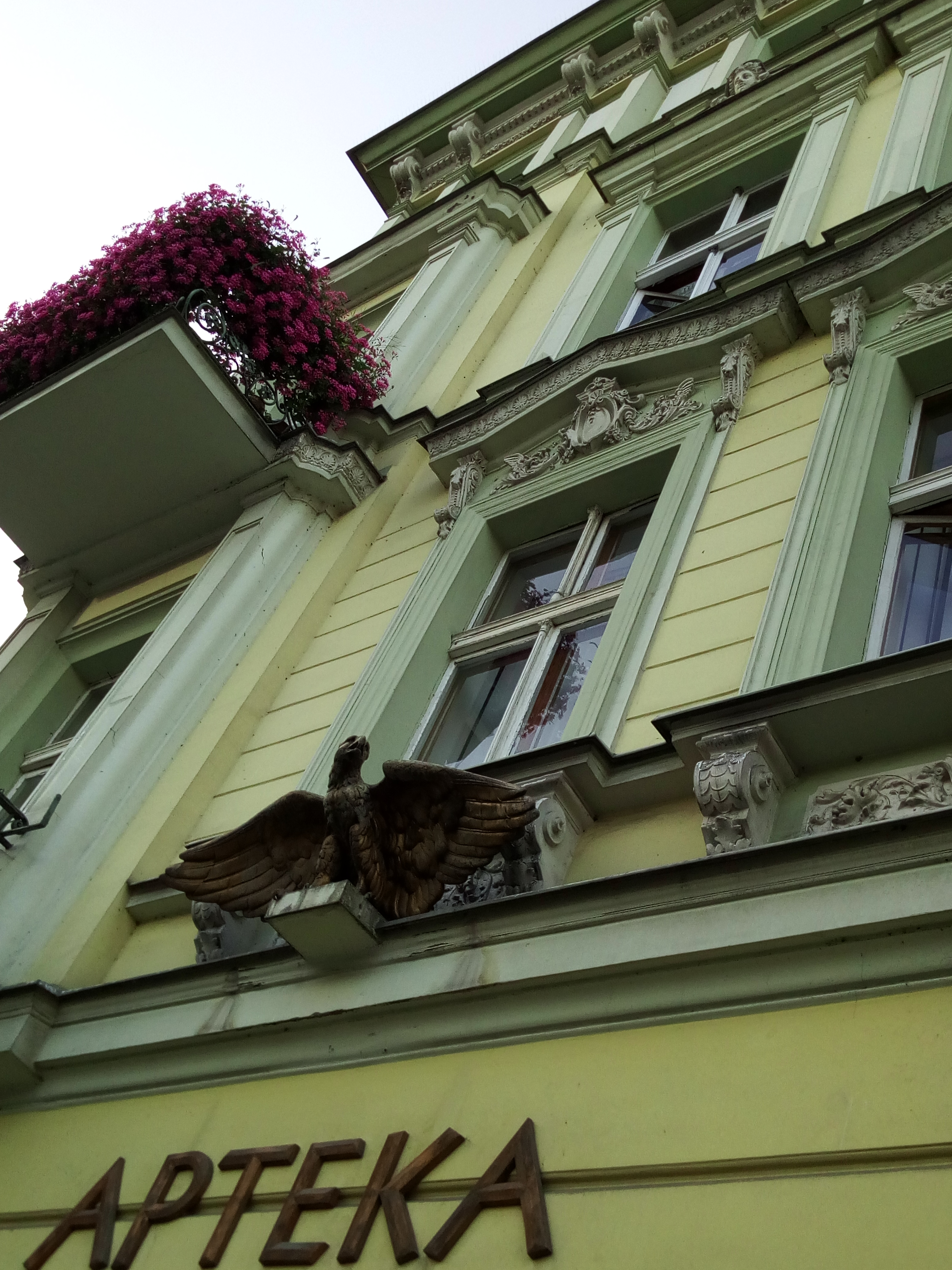
Golden eagle: pharmacy's emblem

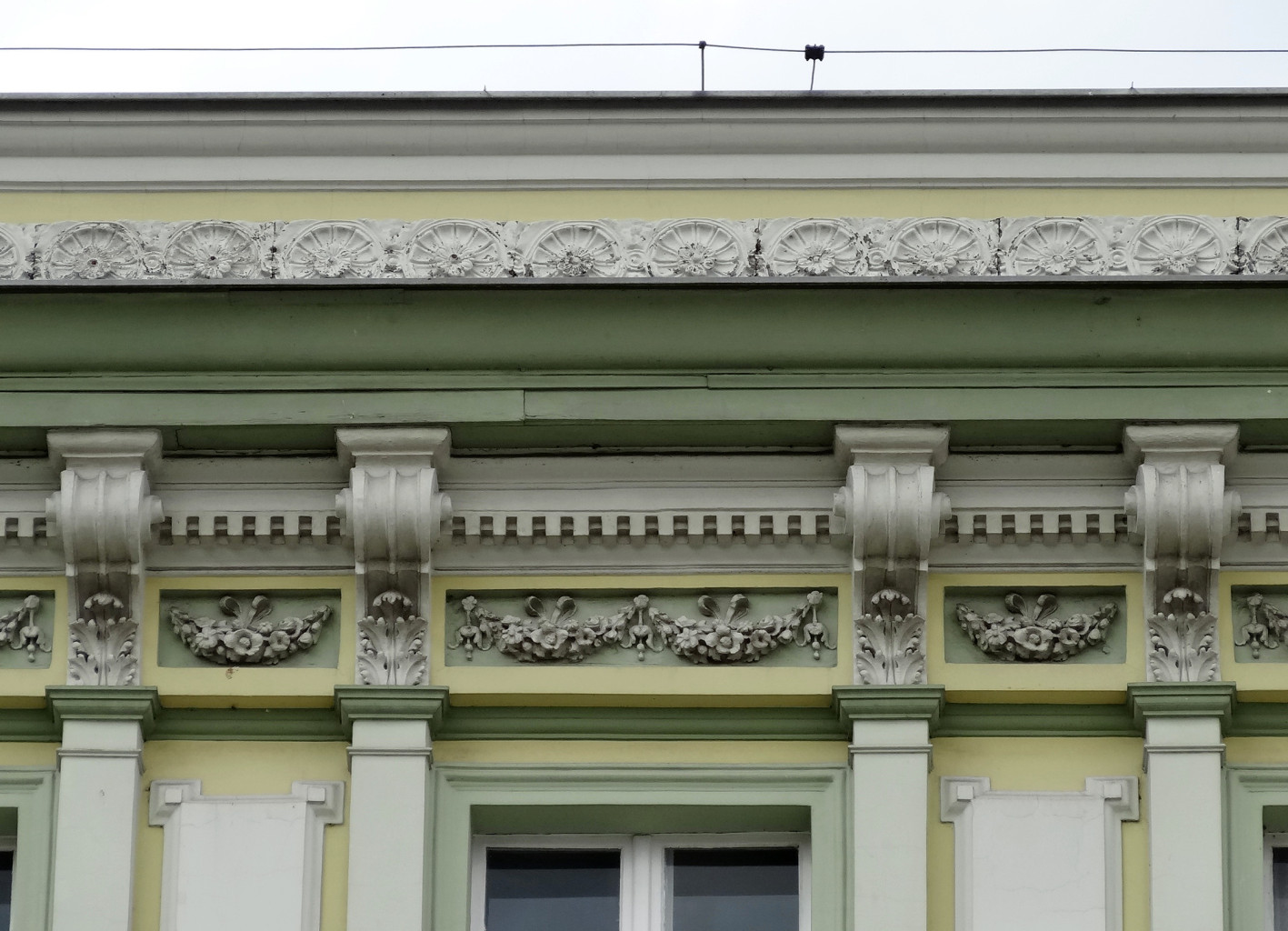
Adorned lintel and rosettes

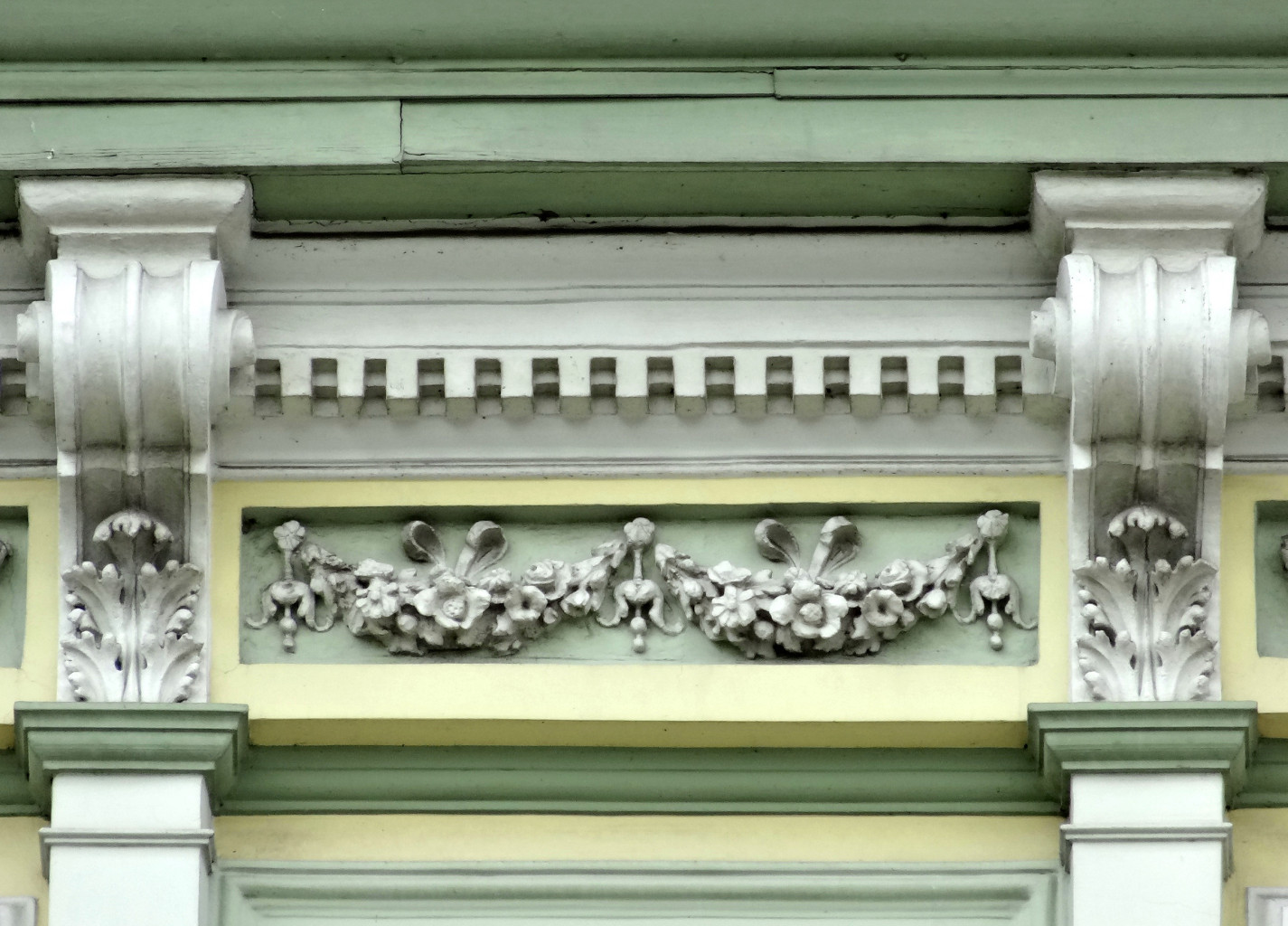
Festoon

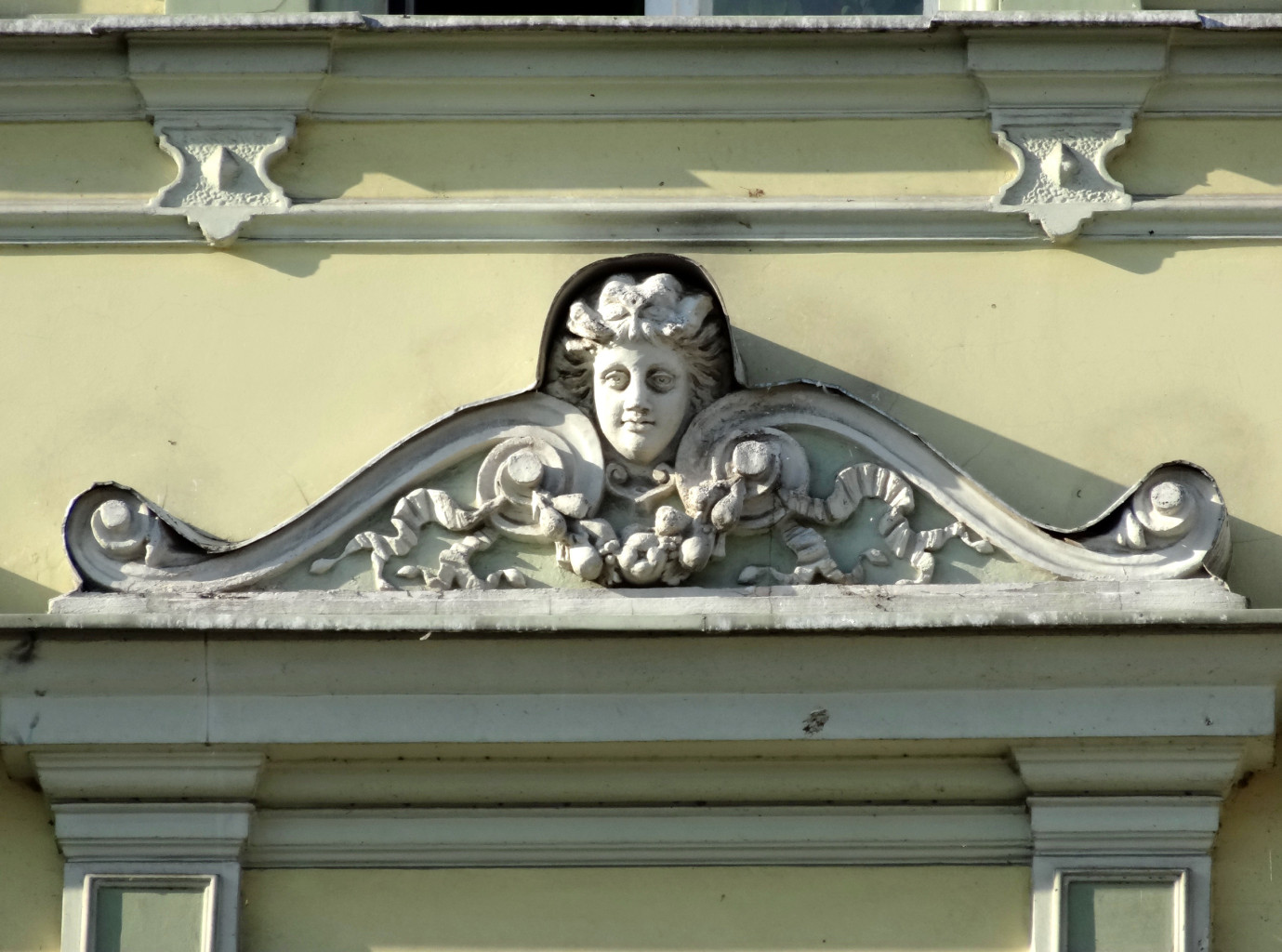
Pediment with woman figure

House at 3
17th century
Neo-classicism

From the 1880s to the end of the Prussian rule, the house housed the Barnaß family, working in distillation business (German: Distillation und Liquörfabrik). A local old book shop, Bydgoski Antykwariat Naukowy, is located on the ground floor of the building. Since 1969, nationwide auctions have been held here. On the façade, one can notice a plaque commemorating Tadeusz Nowakowski (1917–1996), a Polish writer and journalist, activist in exile, as honorary citizen of Bydgoszcz in 1993.

During 1975 renovation works, on the ceiling of a spacious room of the basement, beams with remains of polychrome have been unveiled. Several of them are written dated: 1678 and 30 October 1590. Three beams have been moved for display in the house at Nr. 12, where at the time stood the Węgliszek art cafe. Nowadays, the elevation, stripped from its decoration, features a few lintels or triangular pediments and pleasant ground floor round top openings.

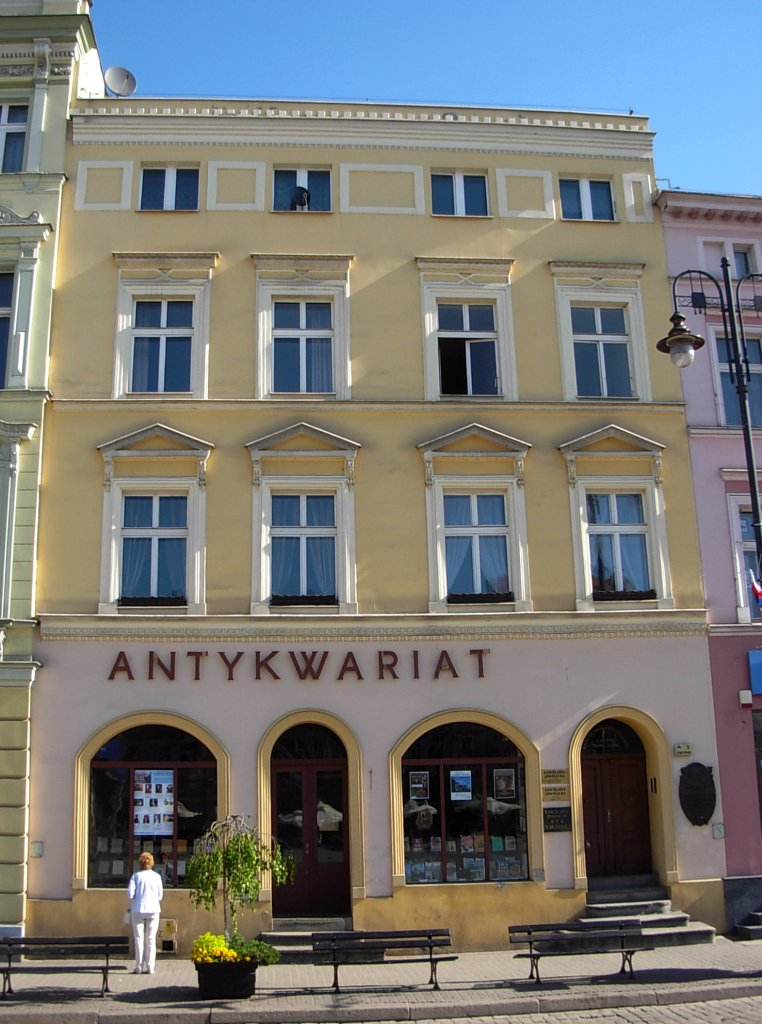
Main frontage

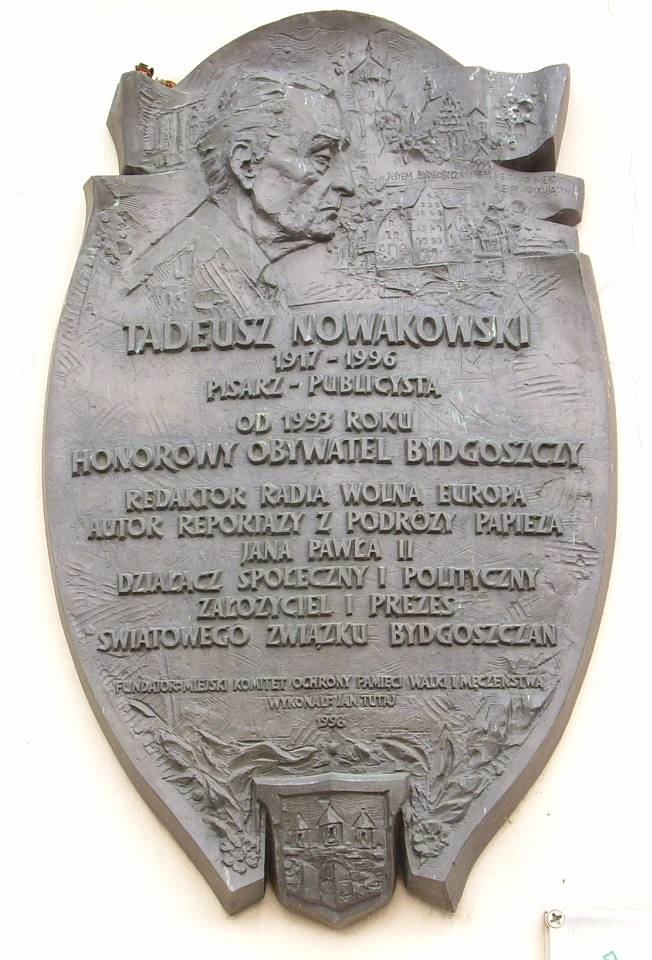
Tadeusz Nowakowski's plaque

House at 5
18th century
Neo-classicism

In 1642, the owner of the house was Maciej Pułkowski, a city burgher. Next landlord was a so-called Wilhelm, a Scot trading agent, Wilhelm Wallace, whose daughter Anna married Michał Paulusik, the town councilor and mayor of Bydgoszcz In the late 19th century, the building was owned by the family Vincent until the outbreak of WWI. At that time, the house housed also a large beerhouse, Automat.

The colored frontage, without motifs, exhibits neo-classic style.

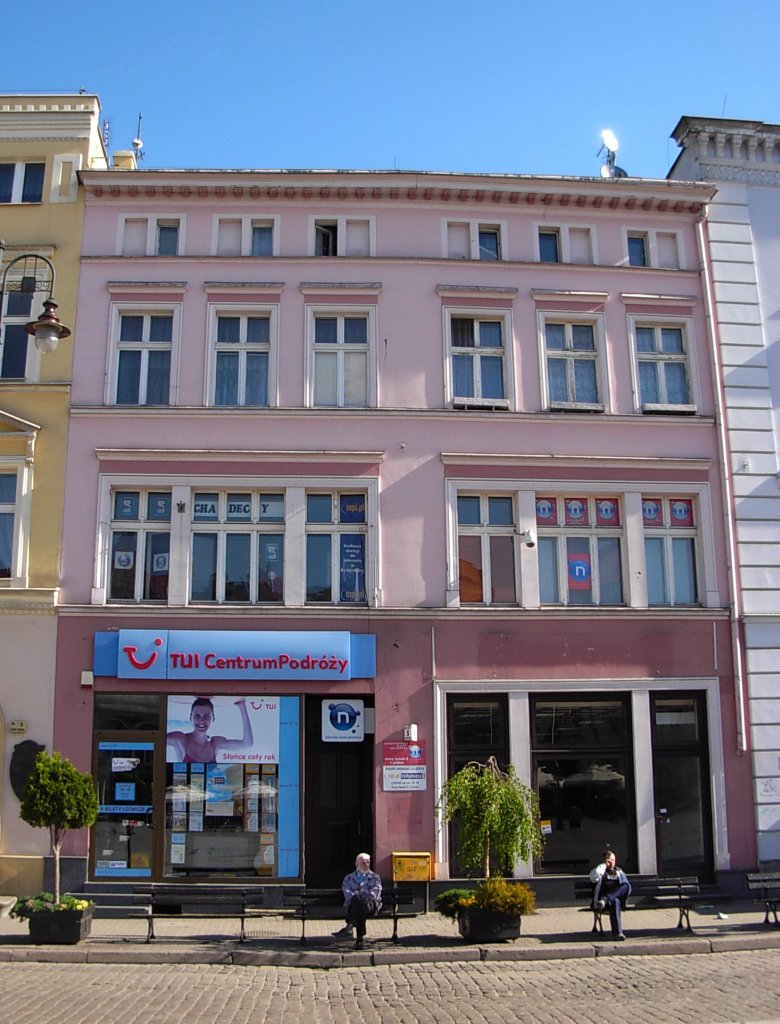
Main elevation on the square

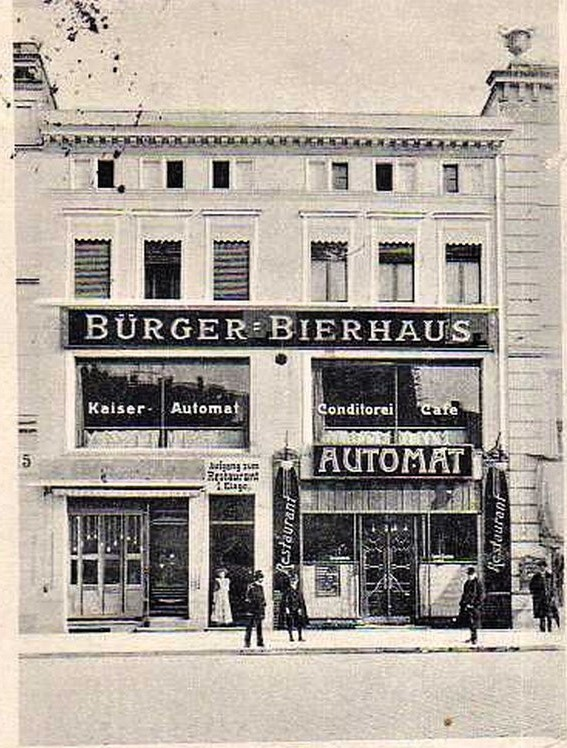
Picture of the Beer House Automat ca 1912

House at 7, corner with 1 Mostowa street
1765–1774
Italian Neo-Renaissance

The first mention about this house dates back to 1676, its landlord being Adam Szydłowski, a city councilman and administrator (1689). His wife Anna, née Paulusik, came from Łobżenica. She was the sister-in-law of mayor of Bydgoszcz, Wojciech Łochowski. In the late 17th century, the building was sold a house to Wilhelm Wallace, also owner of Nr. 5 since 1642. Wilhelm Wallace was a Protestant and travelled regularly to Łobżenica to attend service religious ceremonies in the local community of the Unity of the Brethren.

The house was ruined during the Great Northern War at the beginning of the 18th century. In 1765, a single-storey tenement house was bought by Antoni Niebieski from Fordon. In turn, in 1789, he sold it for 1200 Prussian thalers to a German merchant, Fryderyk Kuerschner, who was one of the first settlers to dwell belonged in the Netze District.

In 1792, the house was auctioned together with the building at Jezuicka Street 4, and bought by a real estate agent, Jan Gabryel Oppermann. In 1798, it changed ownership for 4050 Prussian thalers (Jan Kuhlbrunn) and again in 1801, when Fryderyk Herrmann, a wealthy merchant already landlord of several houses, acquired it. Once divorced, Mrs. Schroer was courted by the count Fryderyk Skórzewski from Lubostroń, who had a high position in Bydgoszcz, then district capital during the period of the Duchy of Warsaw.

In 1824, the property was purchased by a merchant, Karol Matthies, who had several works realized (extension, additional floors). The current decoration dates back to this period, and some traces of this remodeling are still visible today. Mr. Matthies used the entire edifice for himself, making this building one of the few houses in Bydgoszcz Old Town without an inner yard. Since Karol did not pay the money back for the loans of the extension, his lender the count Mikołaj Hutten-Czapski had to auction the property on 24 February 1831. Eventually the count purchased it to secure his capital. After his death, his two children Franciszek and Antonina Barbara inherited the building. However, they abandoned it, as both had other dwellings to supervise: Franciszek the domain of Bukowiec -40 kilometres (25 mi) north of Bydgoszcz-, his sister Antonina, having married Antoni Skórzewski, the village of Kretków near Poznań. In 1835, the Czapskis donated the house to the municipal council, together with a fund for the maintenance of an orphanage.

In 1838, the new landlord was a city councilor, Mr Koelbl, a baker, while between 1843 and 1864, the owner was Carl August Franke, a merchant and distiller, who founded the firm CA Franke which main factory is still visible on Mill Island. August Franke had the house rebuilt with a Neo-Renaissance style, as one can appreciate today.

Among the following owners were Max Jachmann (1894), a Jewish merchant: following WWI his daughter Frieda moved to Germany after her marriage, as did many other Jewish merchants, owners of the majority of the shops on the Old Market square and along Mostowa street.

Since the end of World War II, the building is the property of the Administration of Residential Houses (Polish: Administracji Domów Mieszkalnych, "ADM"). From 1990 on, the ground floor has been housing a restaurant.

The tenement house is a two-storey building with an attic. The building present frontage was conceived in 1864, but some reconstruction happened in the 1960s. The corners have been added one storey, giving the shape of a tower, with bossage stripes. Upper openings in the corner towers are arched like triforium. The edifice has a flat roof, and the façades are decorated with simple neo-renaissance motifs.

Similarities of decoration can be found at Długa street 31.

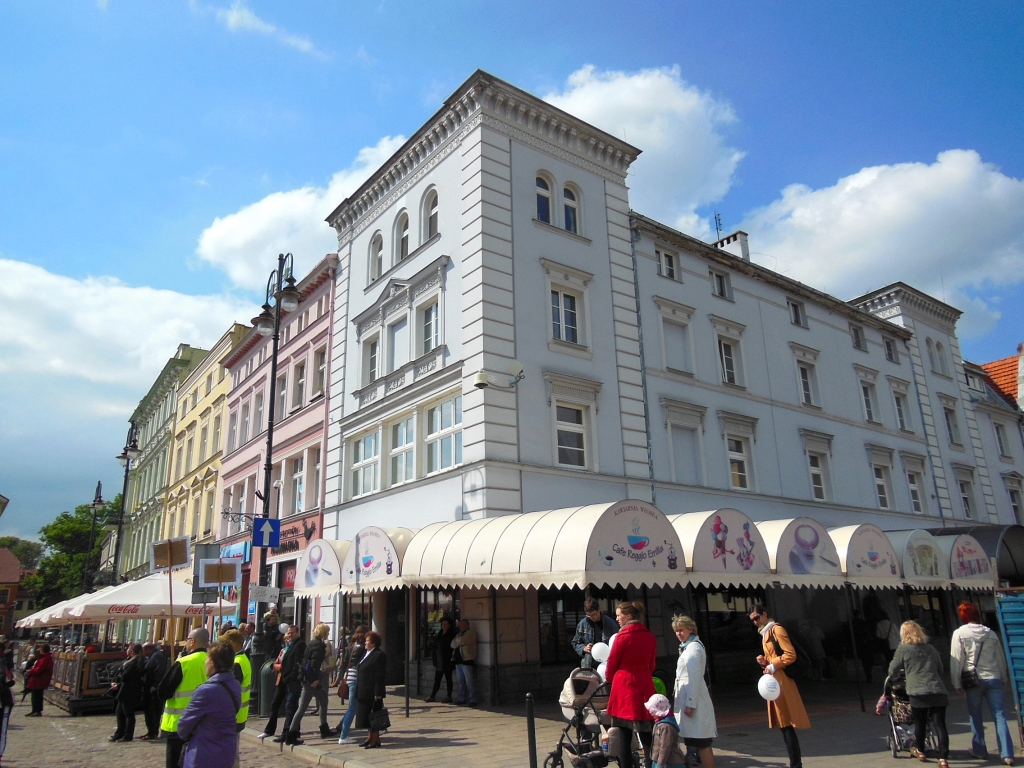
View of both elevations

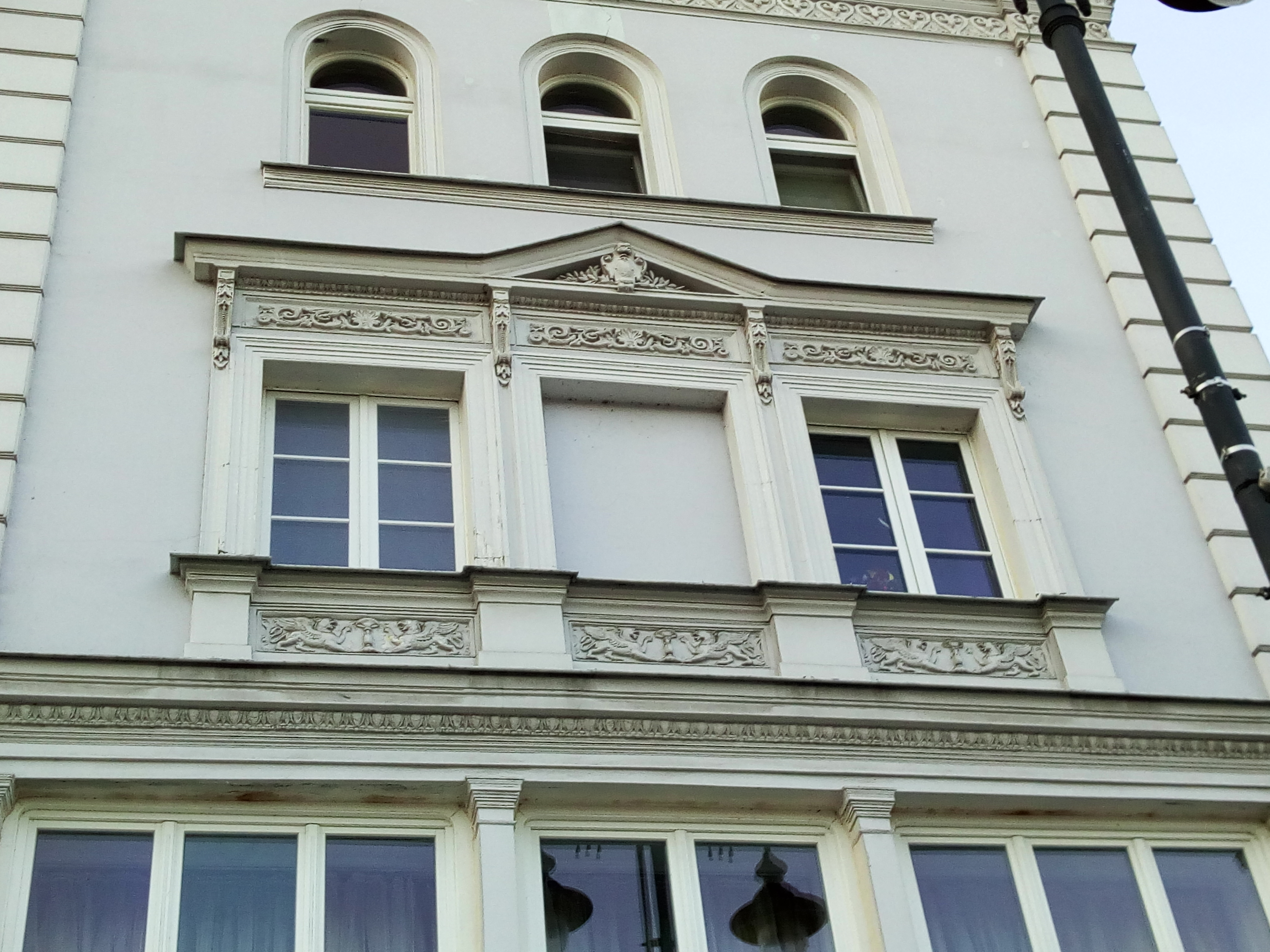
Adorned pediment

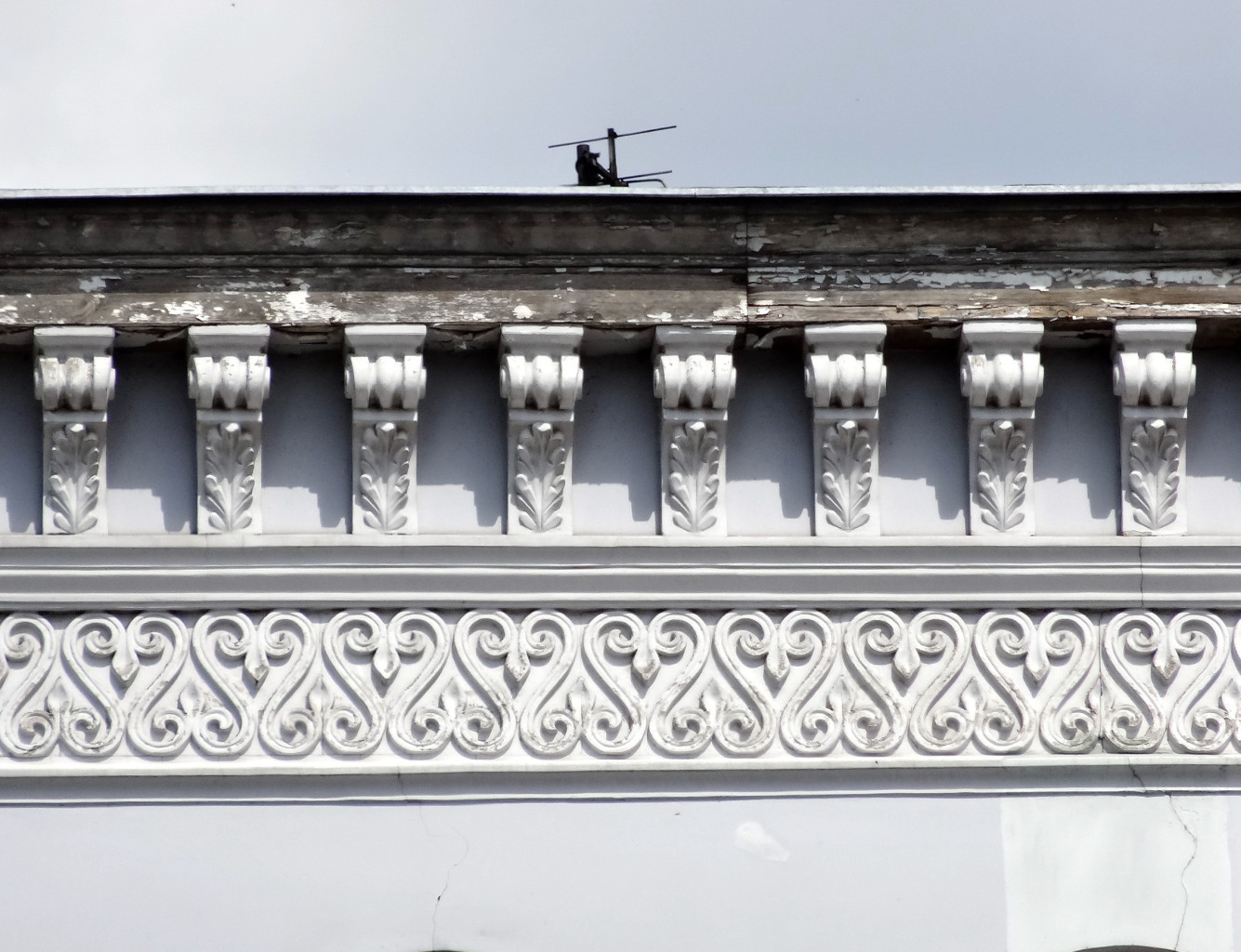
Detail of a frieze

Plots at Nr. 9/13
2015
Modern architecture

The original tenements were demolished in 1940 by the Nazi forces, as part of their project to enlarge Mostowa street. In 1967, the "Kaskada" gastronomic pavilion has been built on their locations. In 2007, city authorities decided to demolish this edifice, then abandoned, so as to reconstruct the frontages of tenement houses. On 10 December 2011 demolition works started, and in 2013, the plots purchased by local entrepreneur Adam Sowa, were rebuilt on a design by Bydgoszcz GM Architects studio. The buildings now houses a marketplace and several other retail places and offices.

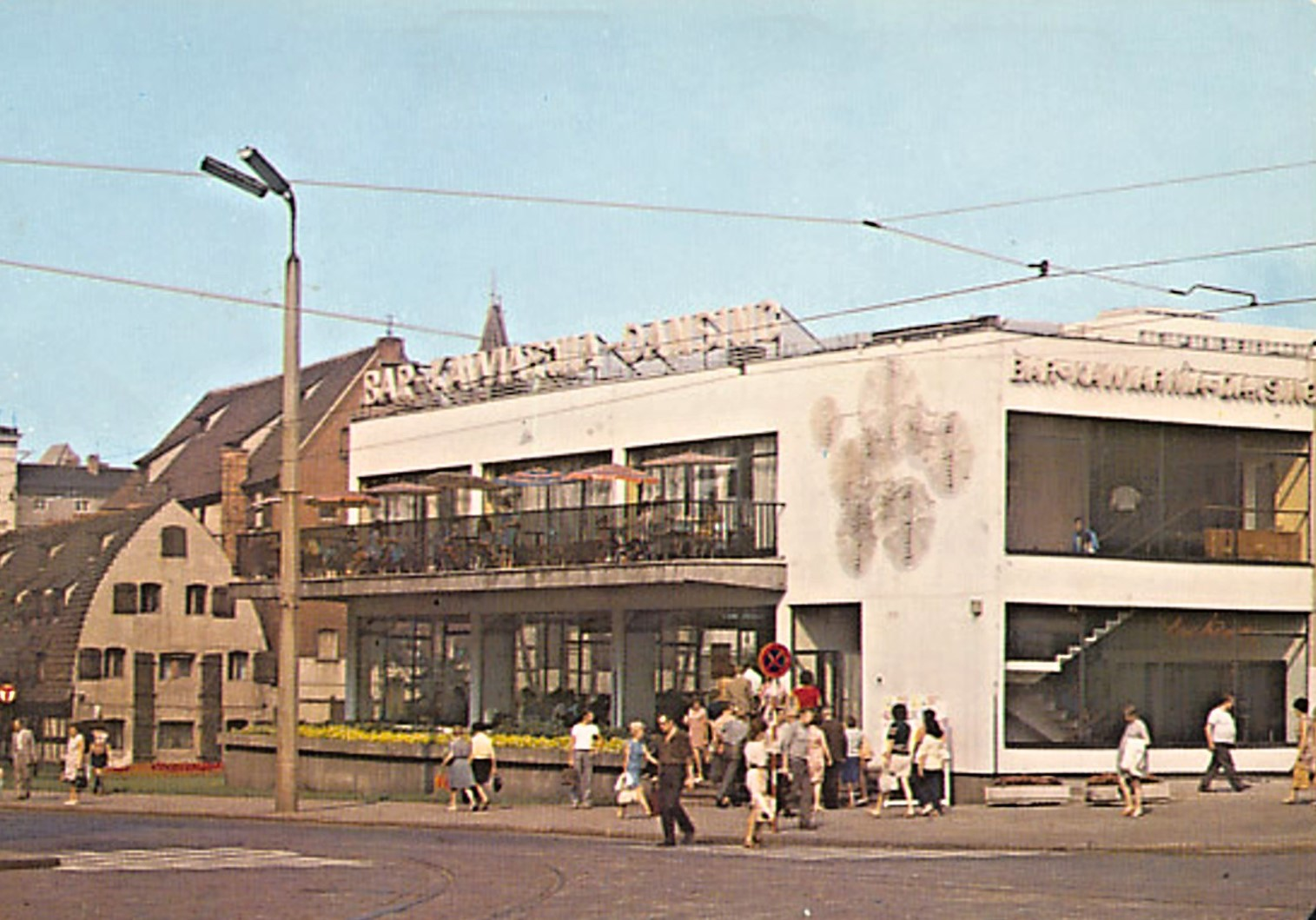
Kaskada restaurant in the 1980s

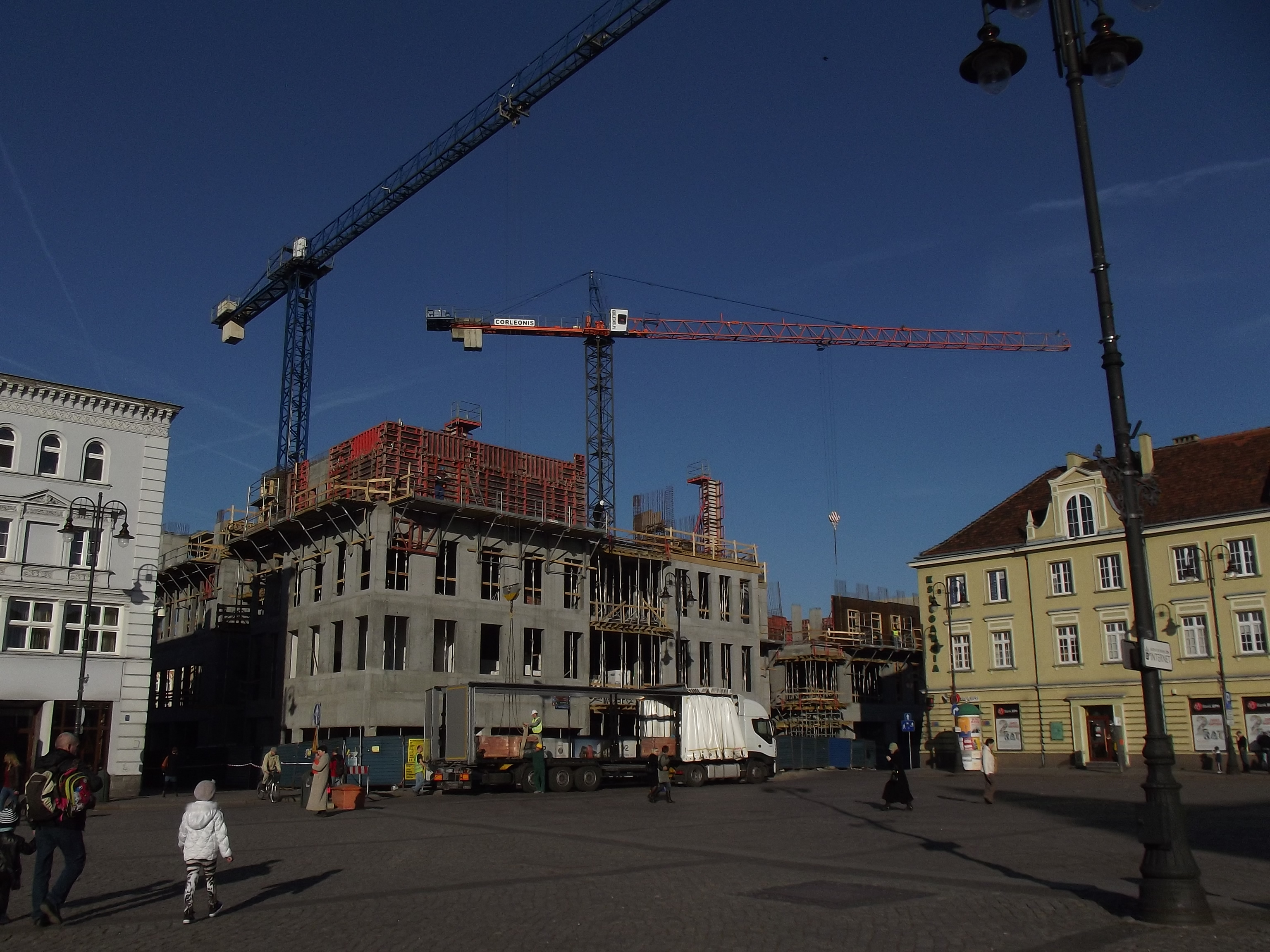
Construction in 2014

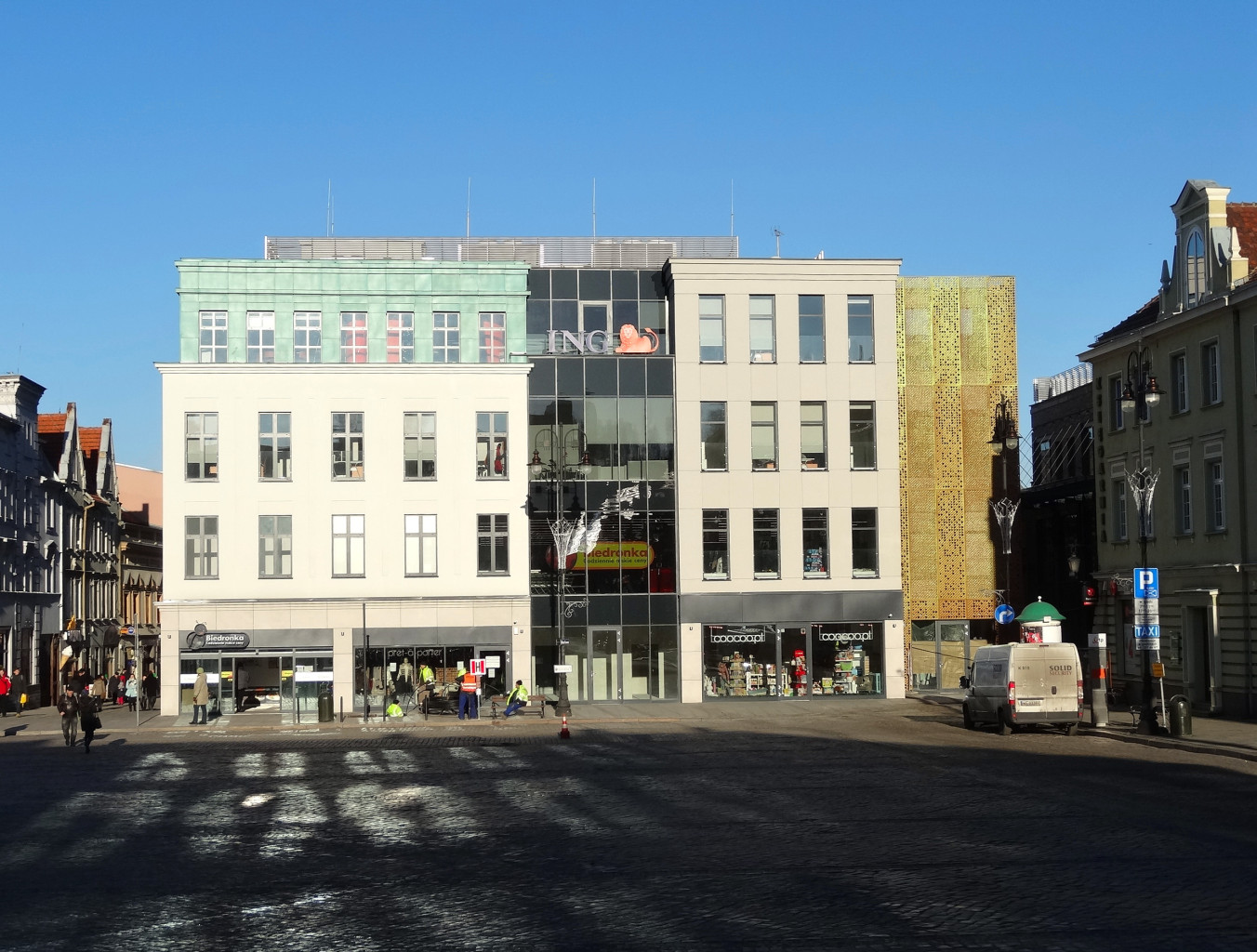
Buildings in 2015

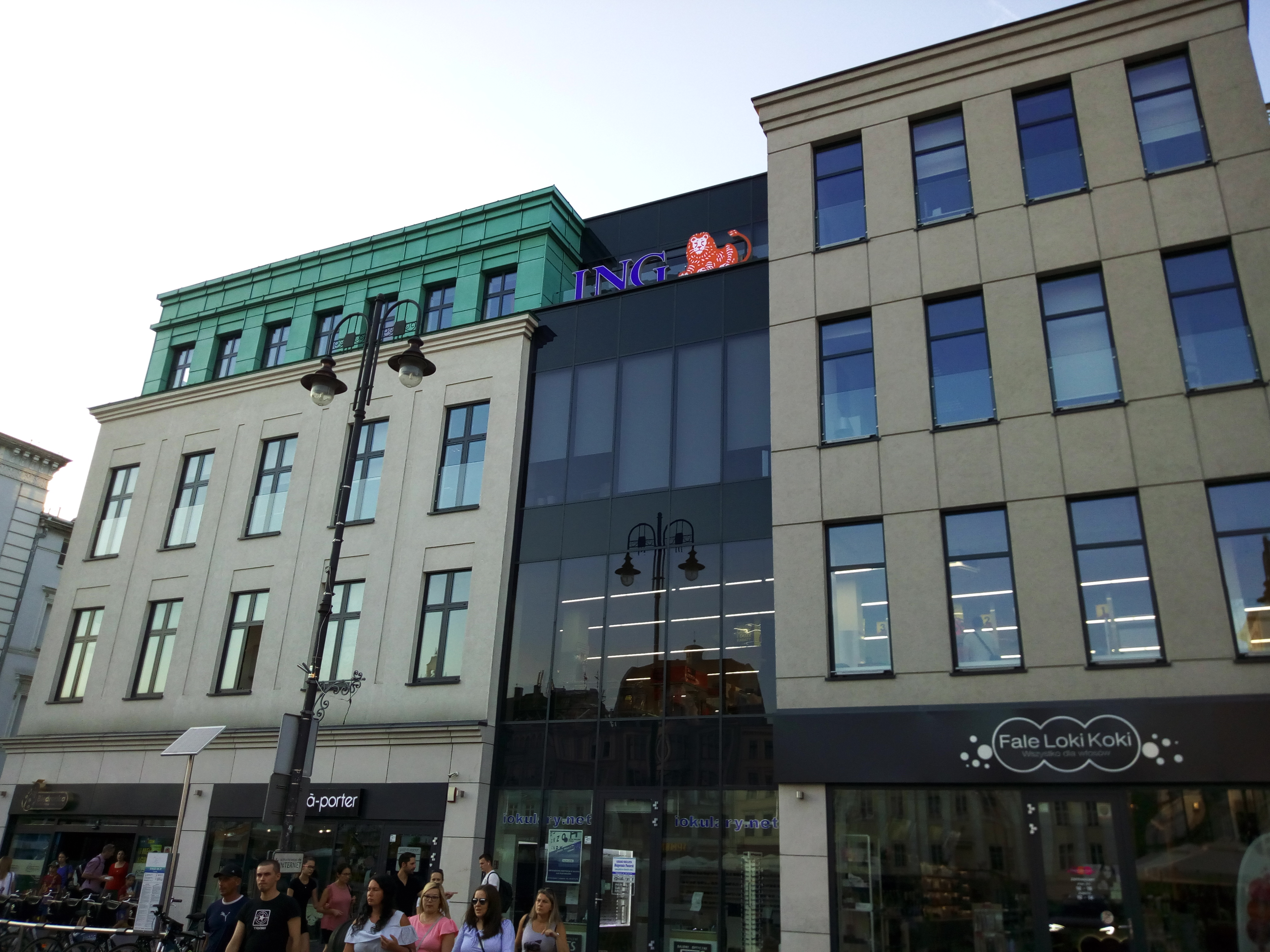
Edifices at 9/11/13 in 2018

=== Eastern frontages ===
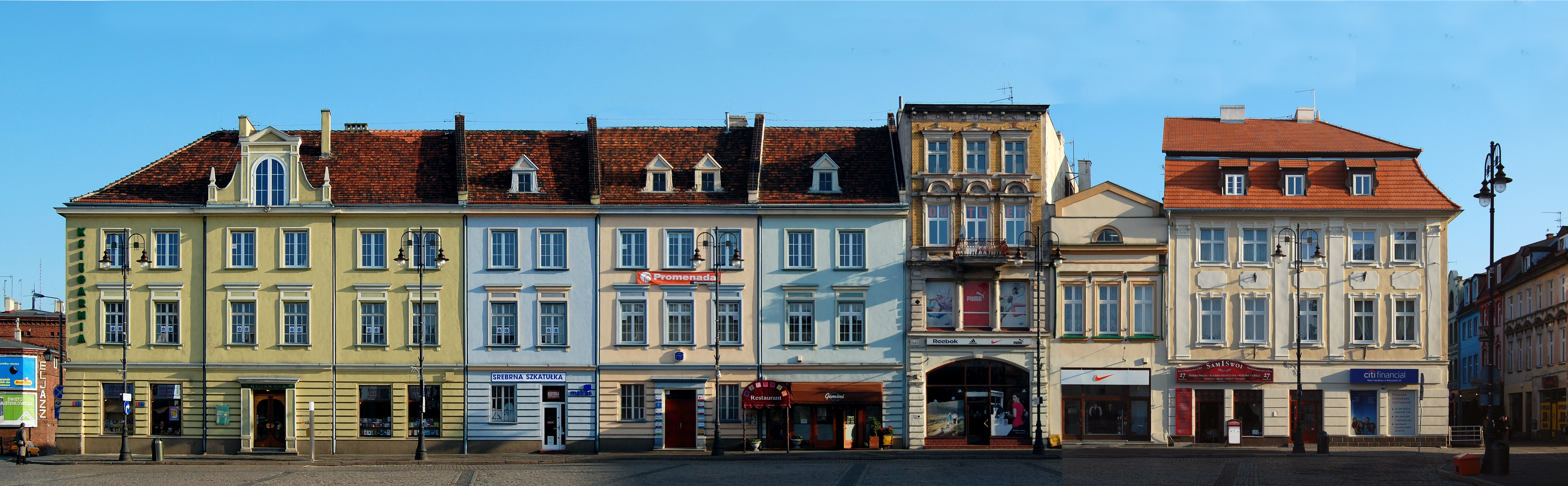
View of the eastern frontages

Parcels located at 15,17,19 and 21 have been partially torn down during the fighting for the liberation of the city in January 1945. After WWII, some buildings partially collapsed while being reconstructed. Eventually, those four historical houses were demolished and rebuilt again, creating a uniformity among their frontages, though different from the original designs.

Houses at 15 and 17
1953–1956
Neo-classicism

In the tenement houses at Nr. 15 and 17, in the late 19th century, Leon Brückmann, a merchant, built a modern department store, which in 1921 became the property of the firm Konfektcyjny S.A. from Poznań, and in 1929 the Dom Towarowy Braci Mateckich ran by brothers Czesław and Władysław Matecki. For many years during the 20th and the 21st centuries, bookstores have been standing at this location.

To revive Pan Twardowski's legend as a local folklore, the city of Bydgoszcz unveiled, on 2 June 2006, a sculpture of him, by Jerzy Kędziora, portrayed as a man dressed like a Sarmatian wearing a kontusz, a cap with a heron's feather, a karabela by his side and the Deal with the Devil paper in his hand. The figure is made of resin with precious metal dust. The statue is animated through three internal engines which allow it to move, turn and wave the hand. The wizard shows himself in the window of the last floor of the house at Nr. 15 at 13:13 and 21:13; the automaton then bows and greets the audience, accompanied in the background by a small light and sound spectacle lasting two minutes.

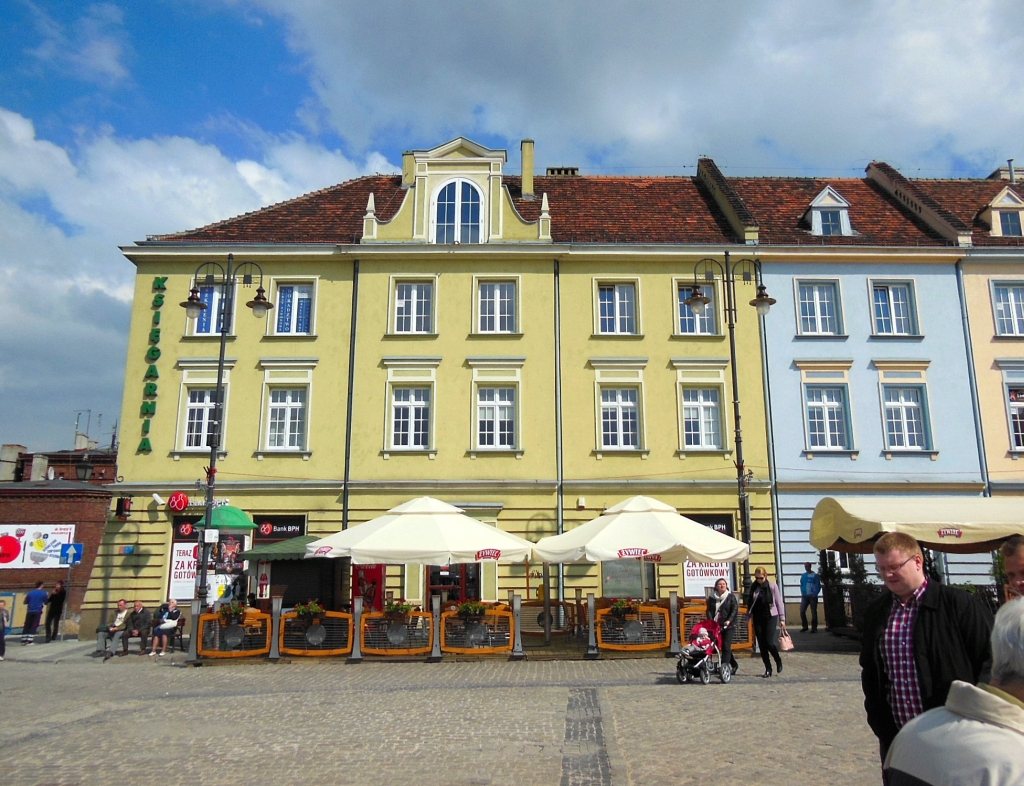
Facades of Nr.15 (yellow hue, left) and 17 (blue hue, right)

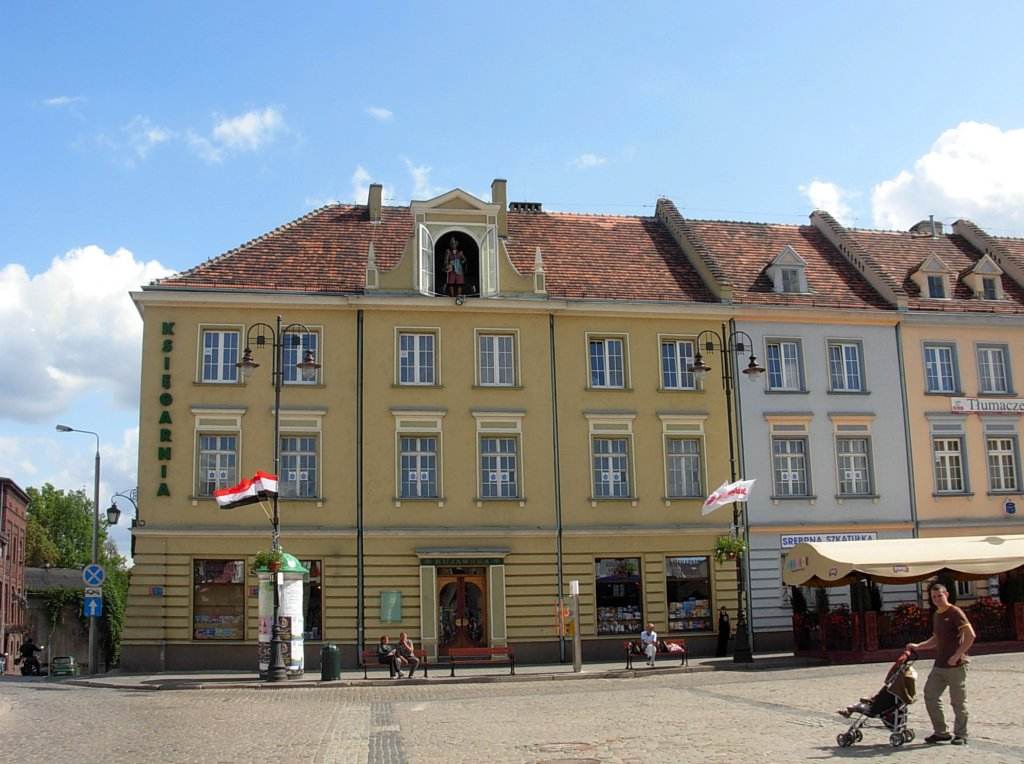
Frontage at Nr.15 from the square, with Pan Tardowski's figure out

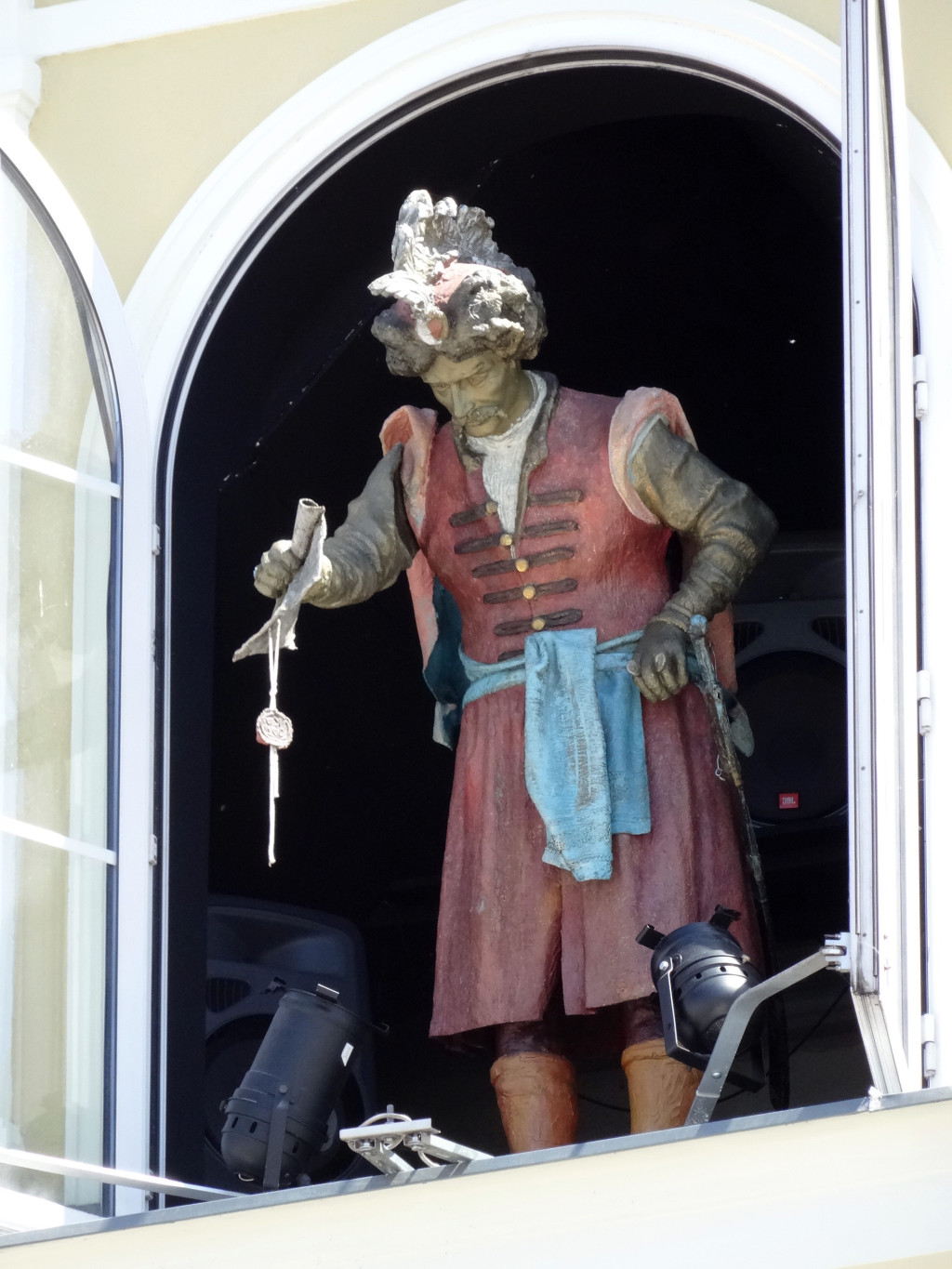
The statue bowing

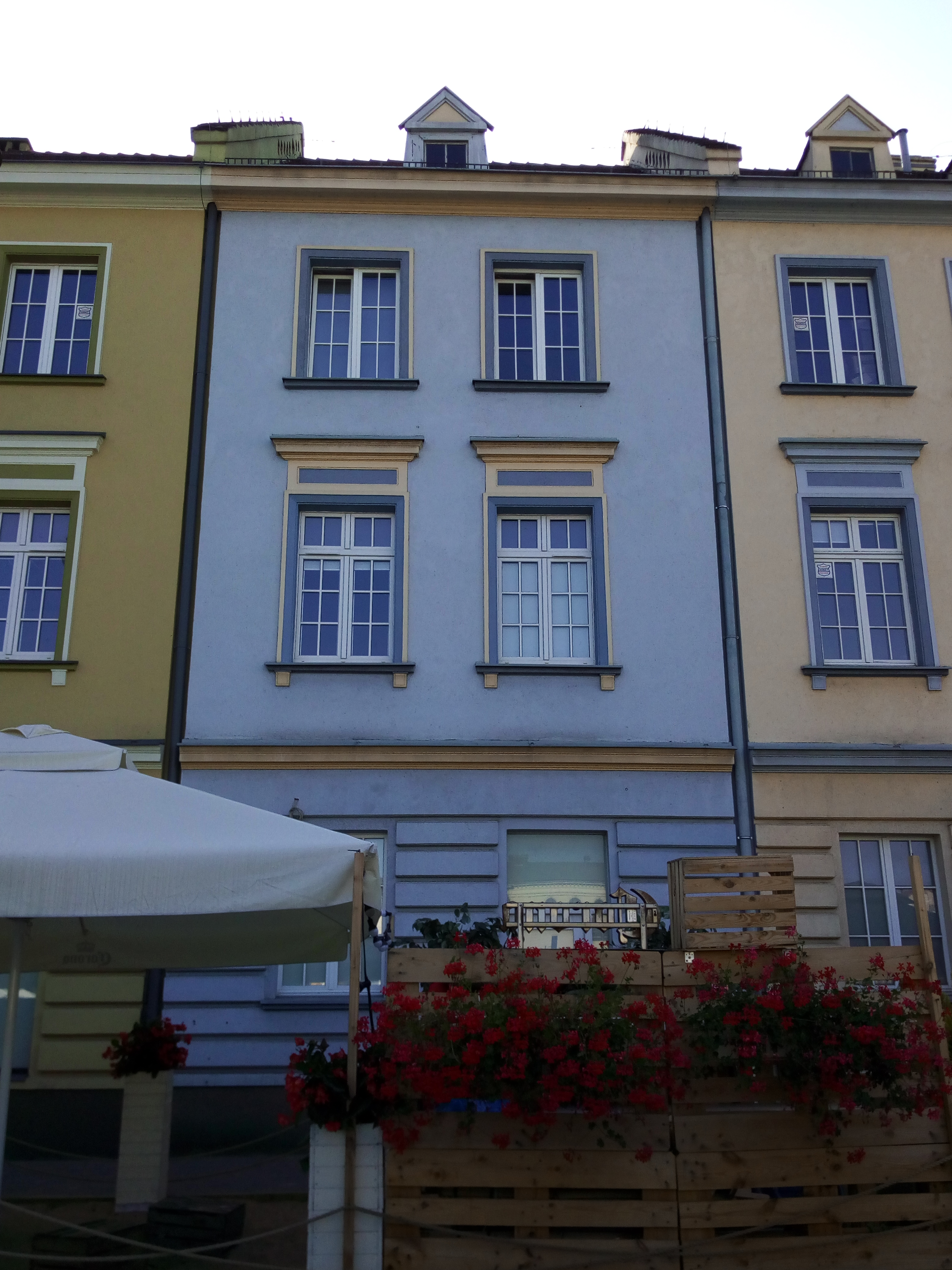
Facade at Stary Rynek 17

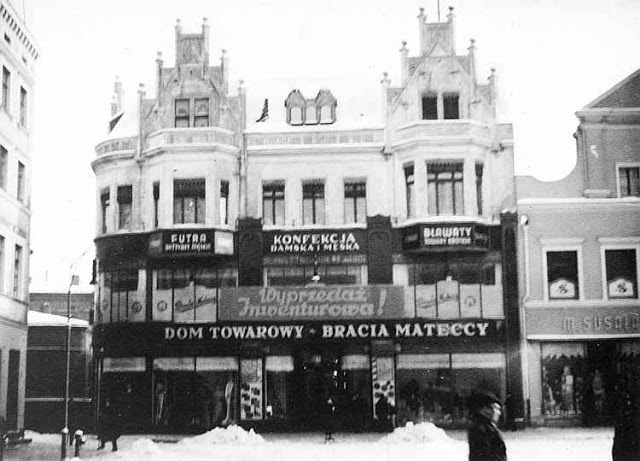
View of the facade at Nr.15 in the 1920s, with the Matecki's shop

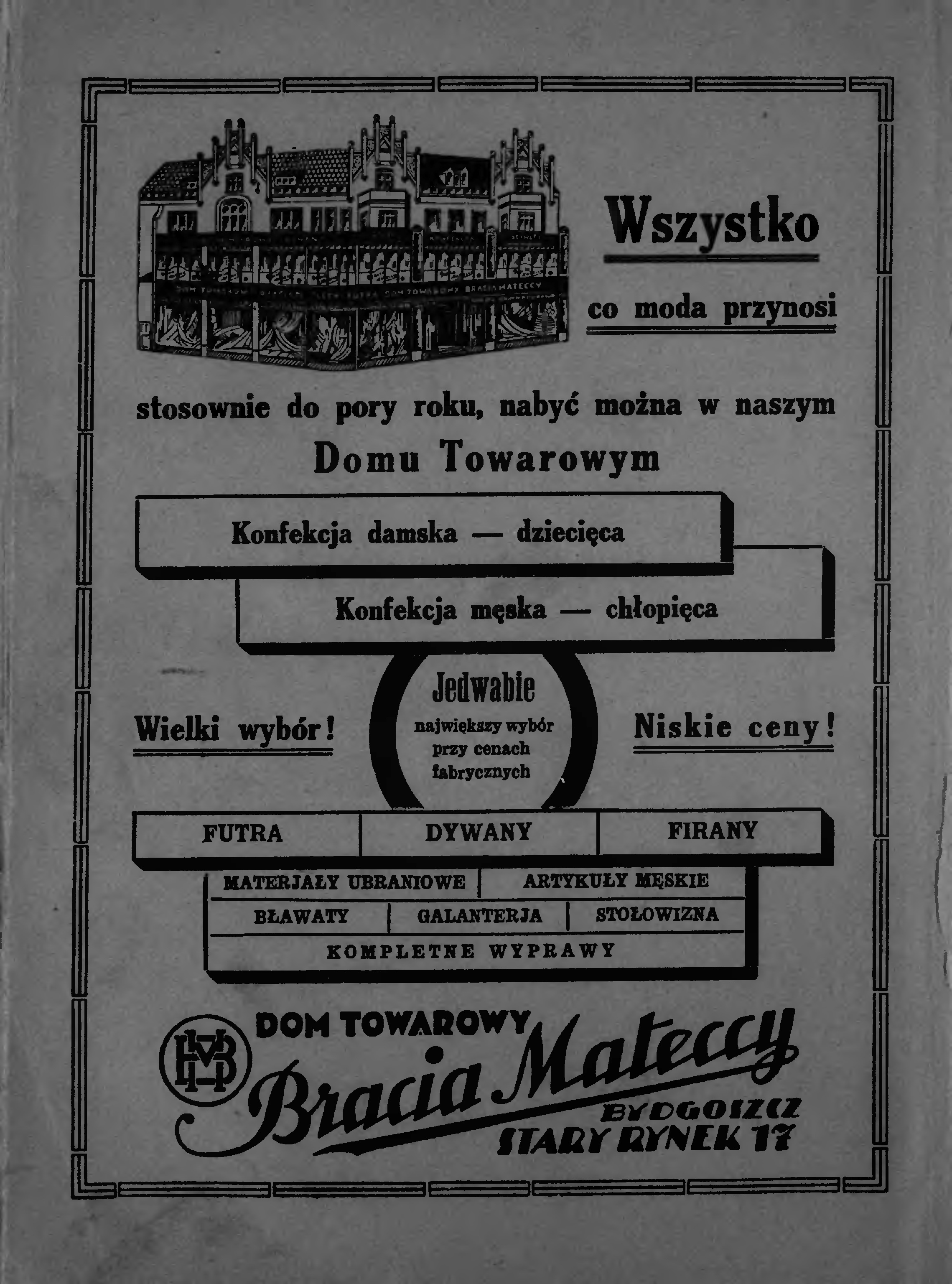
Advertising for the Mateckis' department store ca 1930s

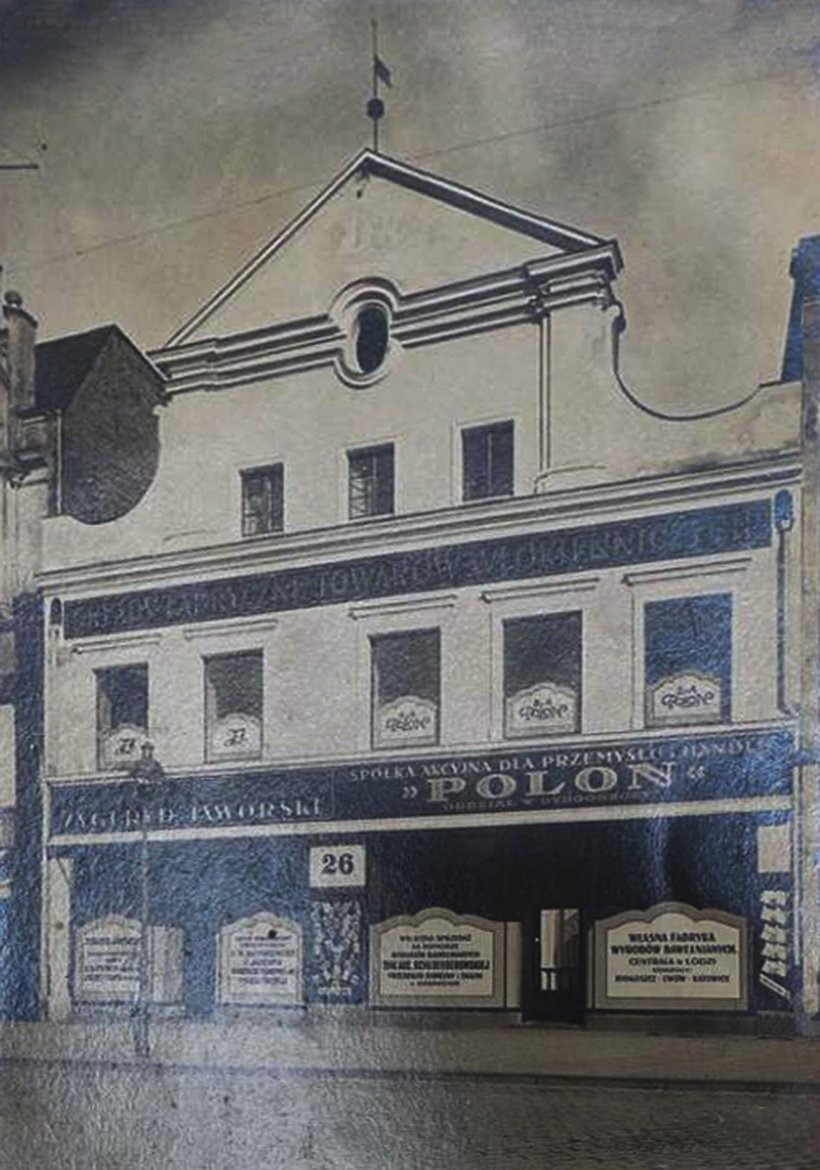
View of the previous house at Nr.17 in the 1920s

Houses at 19 and 21
1953–1956
Neo-classicism

In the 18th century, the building at Nr. 19 hosted a stagecoach station, a post office and a tavern, Pod Zgorzelcem. At Nr. 21, a wine bar (Polish: winiarnia) has been operating until the start of WWII.

The story goes that Pan Twardowski stayed in this inn in 1560, and also drank wine in the company of the devil in a tavern at Przyrzecze Street 10. The automaton show at Nr. 15 stems from this local legend.

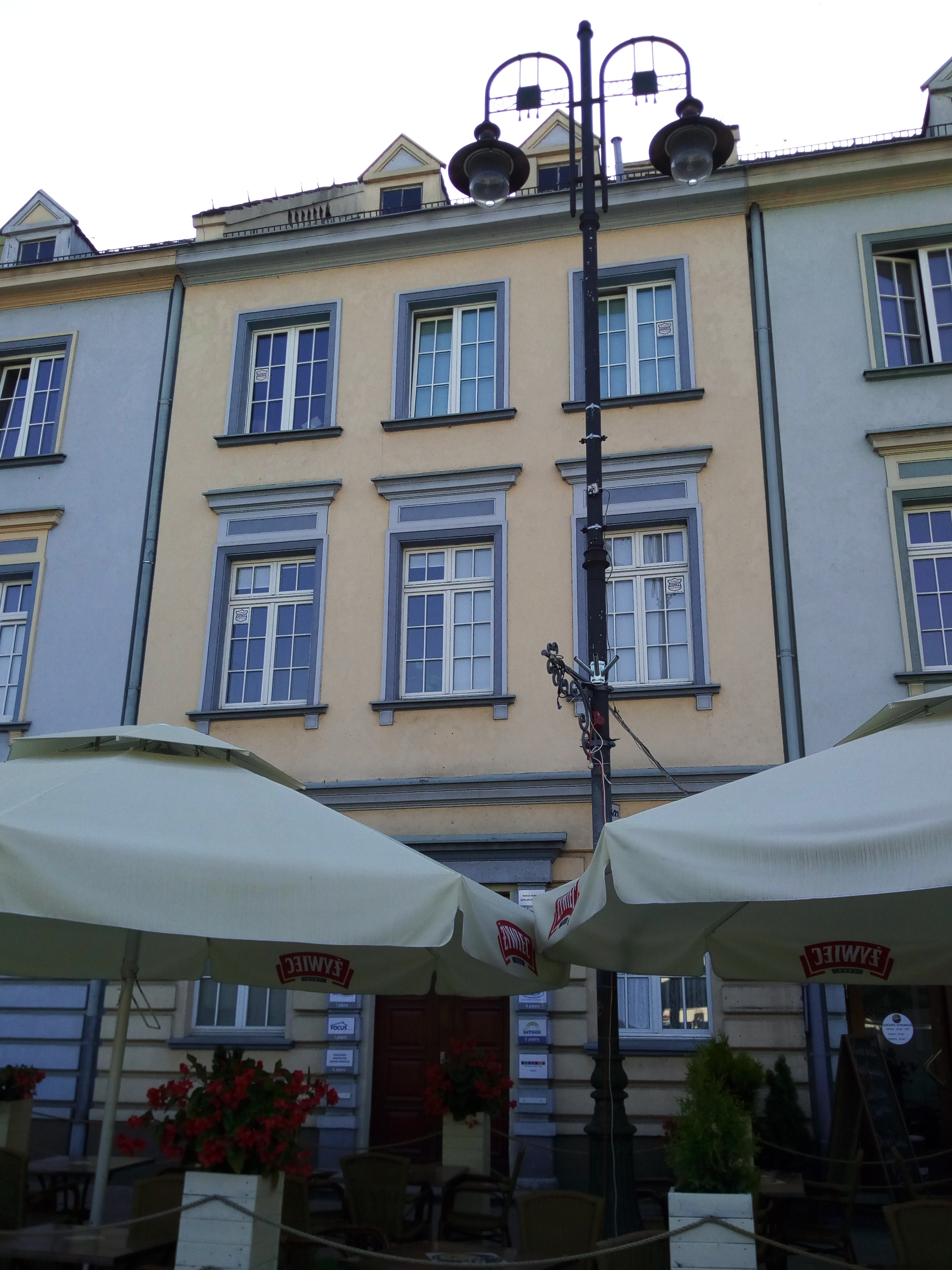
Facade at Stary Rynek 19

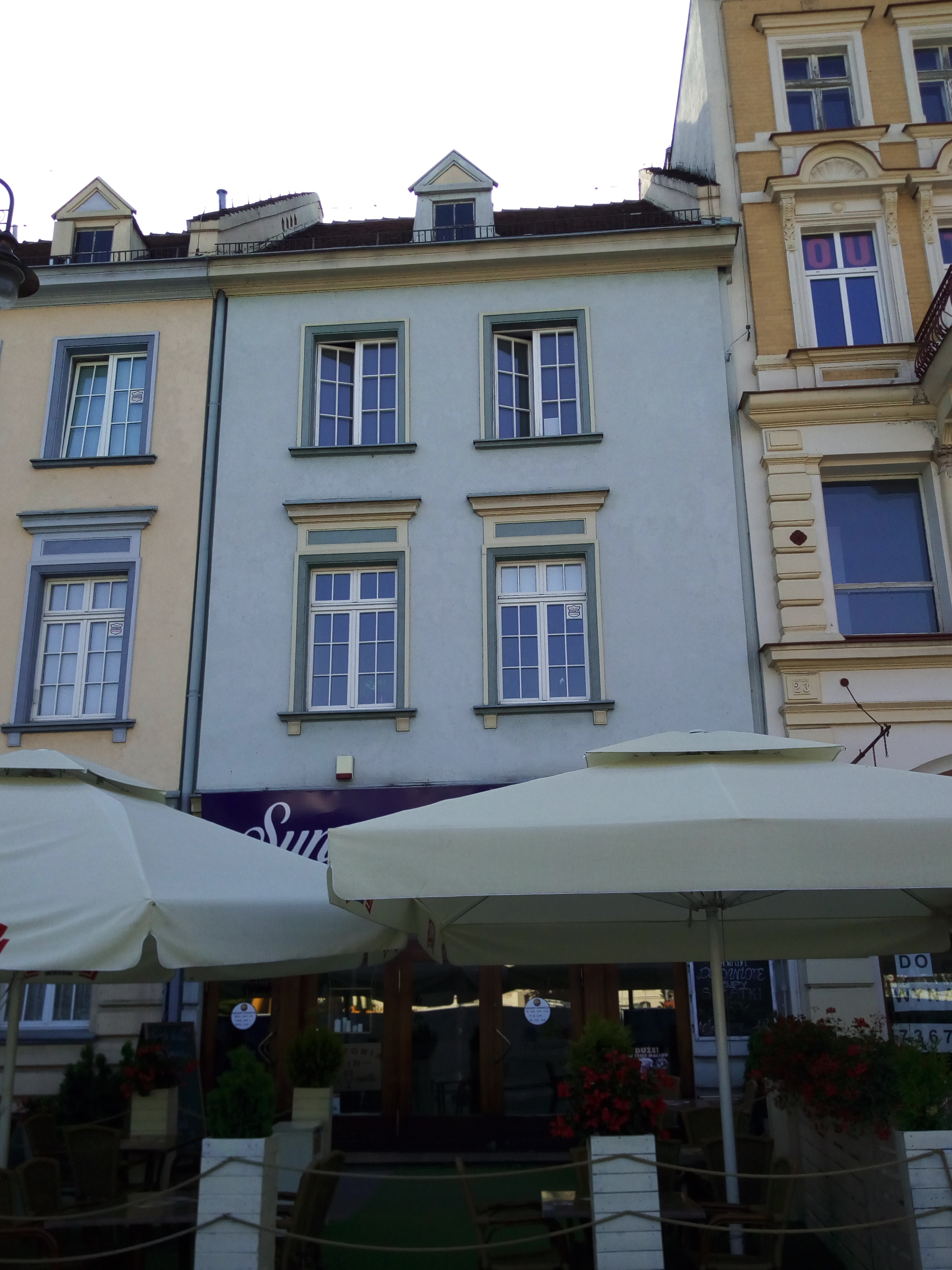
Facade at Stary Rynek 21

Houses at 23 and 25
Early 18th century
Registered on Kuyavian-Pomeranian Voivodeship Heritage List (Nr.A/376/1-2), 14 October 1993
Eclecticism

The house at Nr. 23 has been rebuilt in 1872 for Dorothea Riemann, a soap producer. Then in 1895, a new reconstruction was commissioned by Moritz Meyersohn, a clothing retailer.

The building at Nr. 25 has been reconstructed during the first quarter of the 19th century, at the initiative of Louis Jacobi, who owned a distillation business and lived at Nr. 27, then listed as FriedrichPlatz 30. During the interwar period, the house, together with the one at Nr. 27, housed a drapery led by Roman Stobiecki, specialized in silk.

Neo-classic style frontage at Nr. 23 displays a large round-top window, flanked by bossages, the upper level shows two columns supporting a wrought iron balcony. The last two floors show brick layers and small-scale pediments above the openings. Nr. 25 decoration is more modest, noticeable are the triangular roof and the semi-circular skylight beneath.

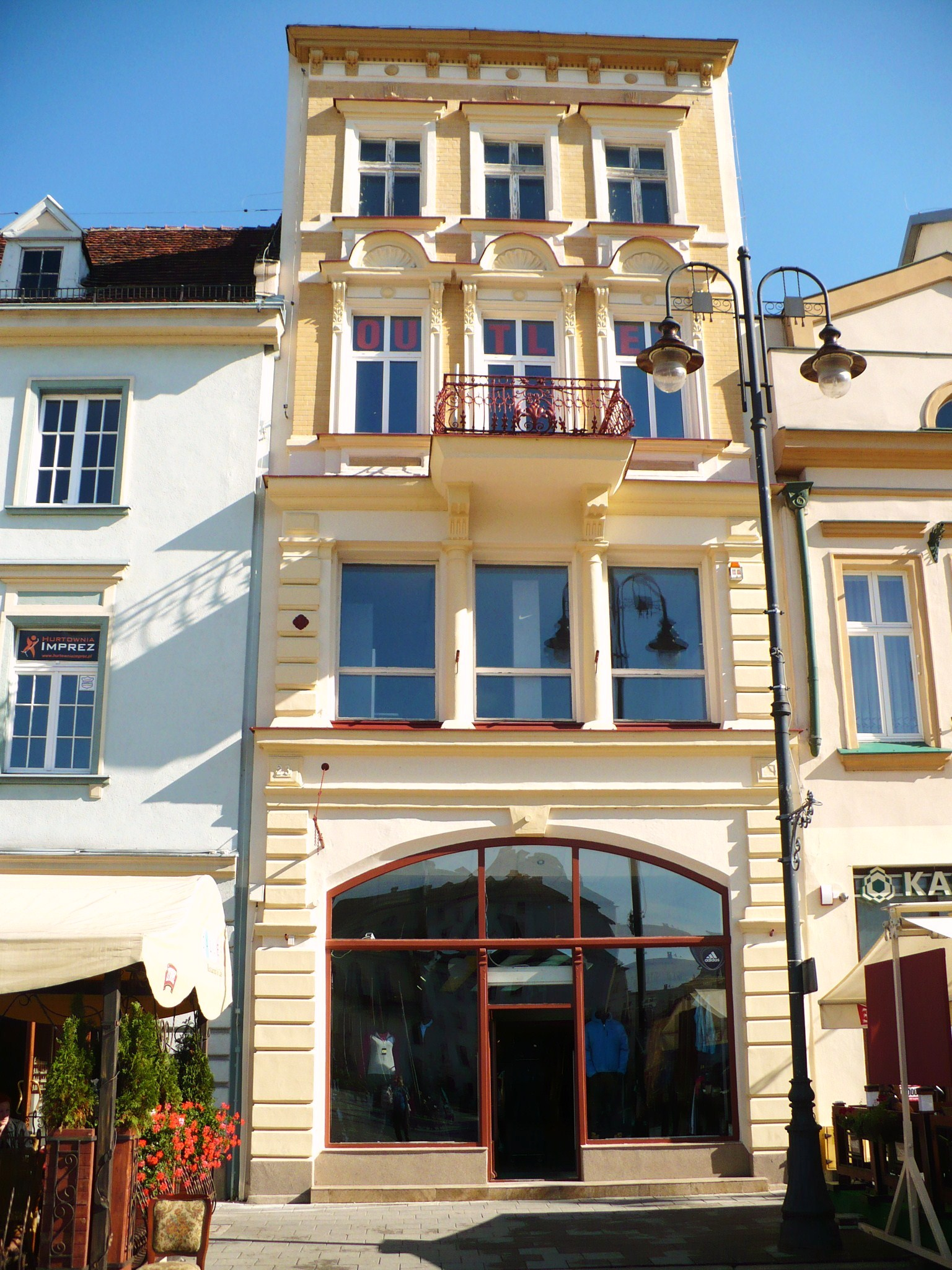
Facade of Nr.23

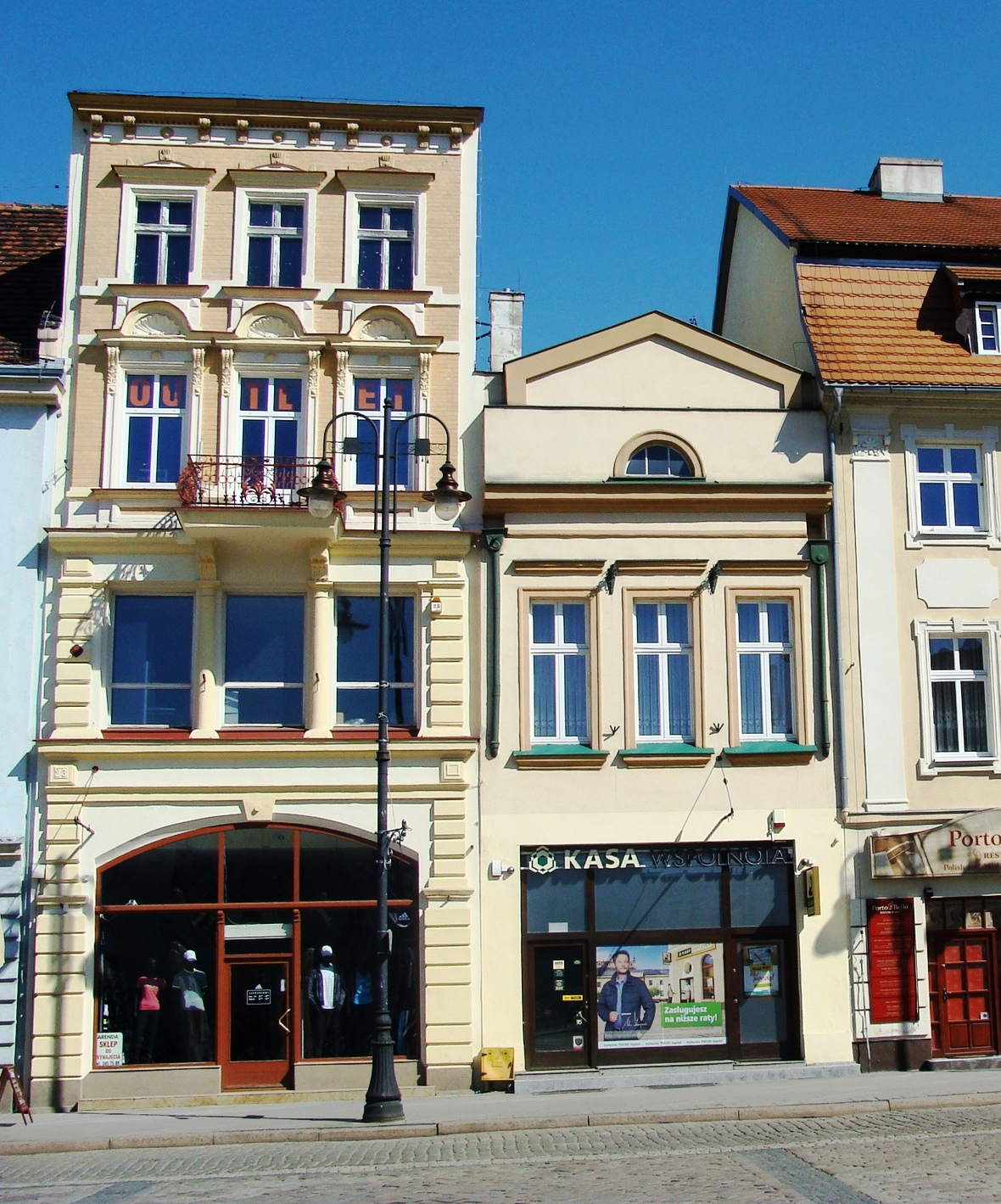
Nr.23 (right) and 25 (right) elevations on the square

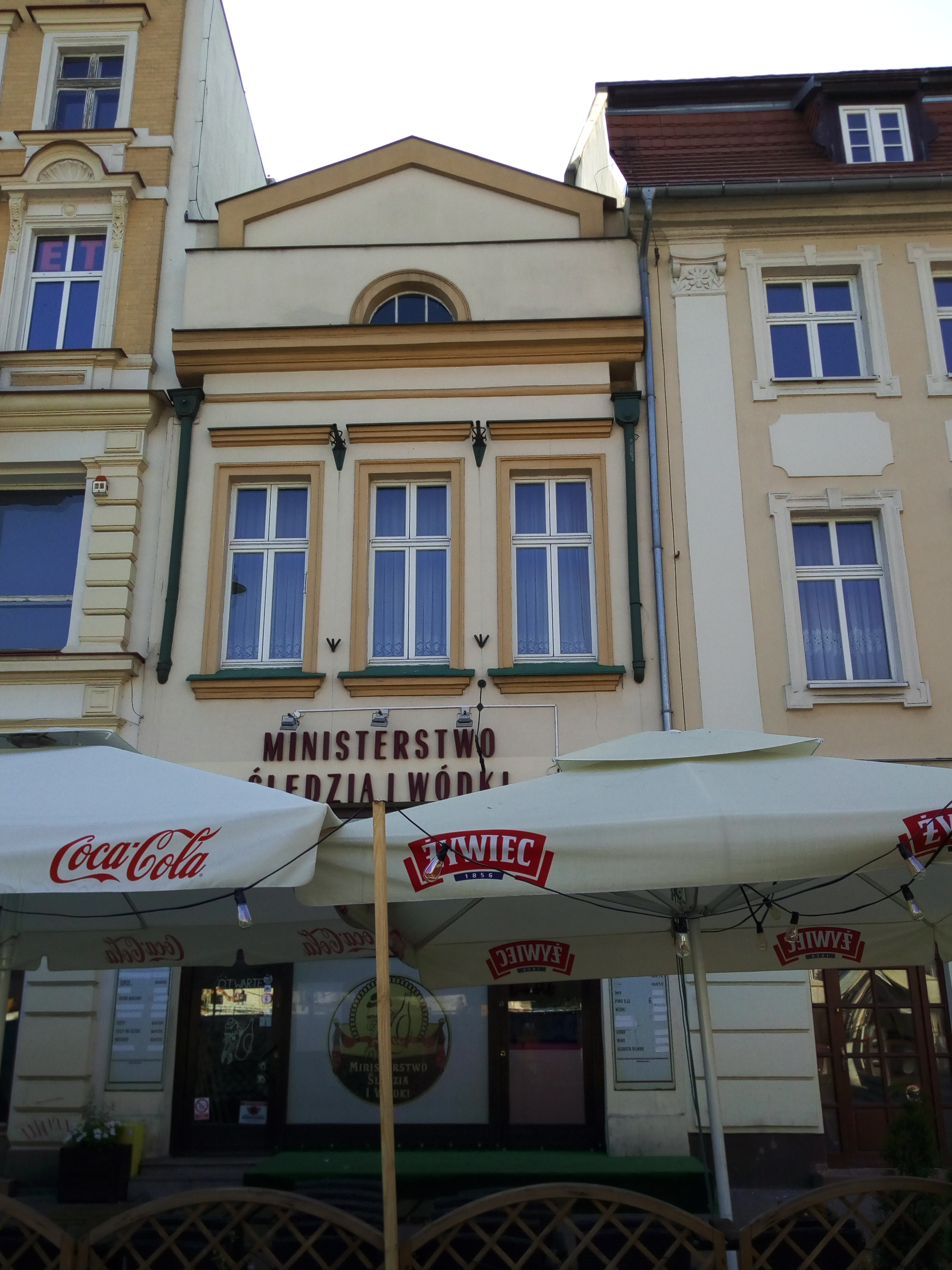
Facade at Stary Rynek 25

House at 27, corner with Magdzińskiego street
1775
Registered on Kuyavian-Pomeranian Voivodeship Heritage List (Nr.A/1278), 3 April 2007
Italian Neo-Renaissance

This tenement was surnamed Under the Golden Salmon (Polish: Pod Złotym Łososiem) after a local inn located there. It has been rebuilt several times between the 16th and the late 19th centuries. Today's frontage recalls the late 18th-century style. Legend has it that French emperor Napoleon stayed in this house on the first floor while traveling to Moscow. From the 1870s to the start of the WWI, landlord was Louis Jacobi, also owner of neighbouring Nr. 25: at this period, the building housed the first furniture factory of Otto Pfefferkorn. During the interwar period, the house, together with the one at Nr. 25, housed a drapery led by Roman Stobiecki, specialized in silk.

The house displays an inner courtyard, a Mansard roof with wooden dormers and a profiled cornice crowning. Basements still possess preserved gothic styled foundations.

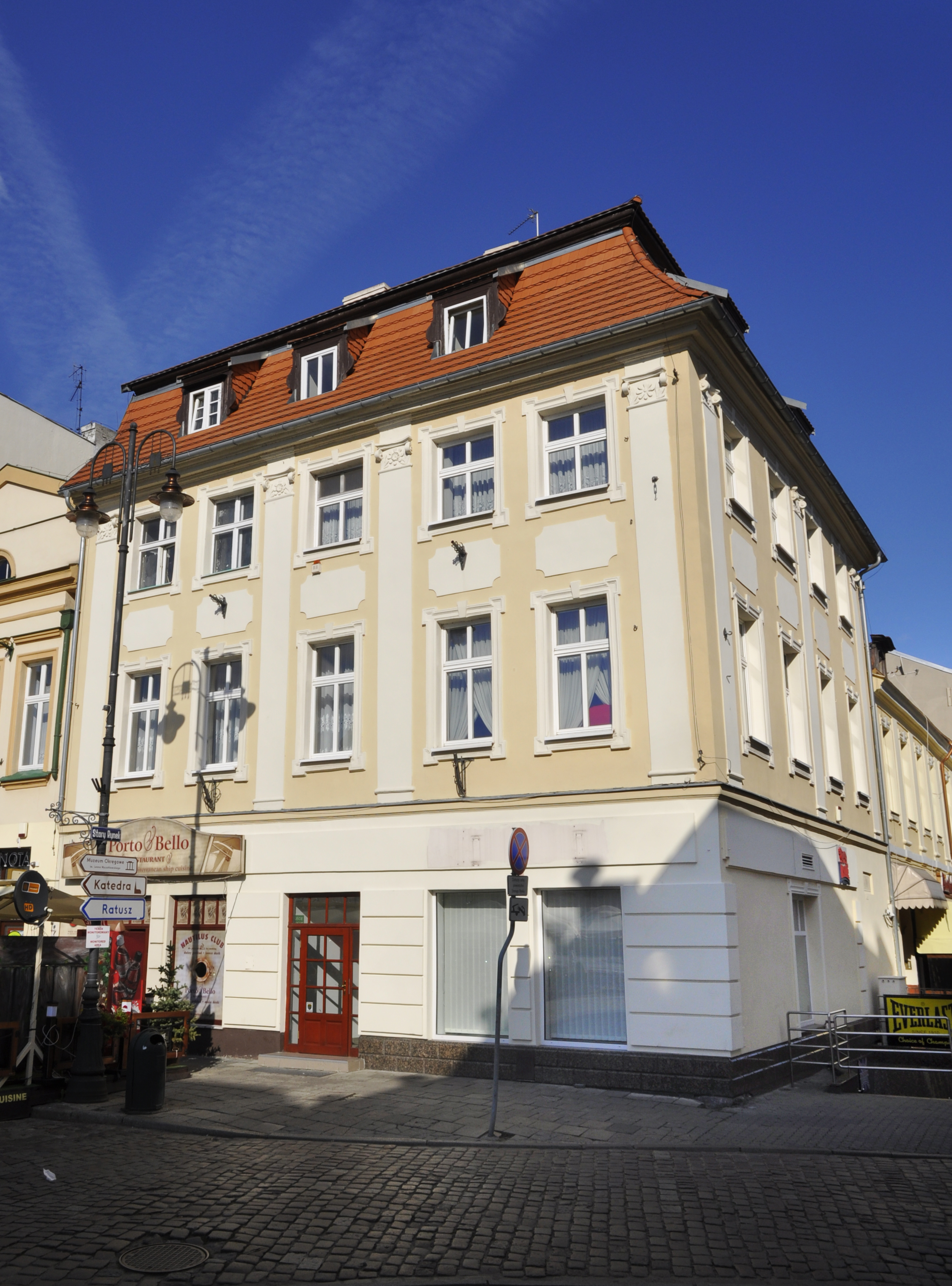
Corner view of Nr.27 elevations

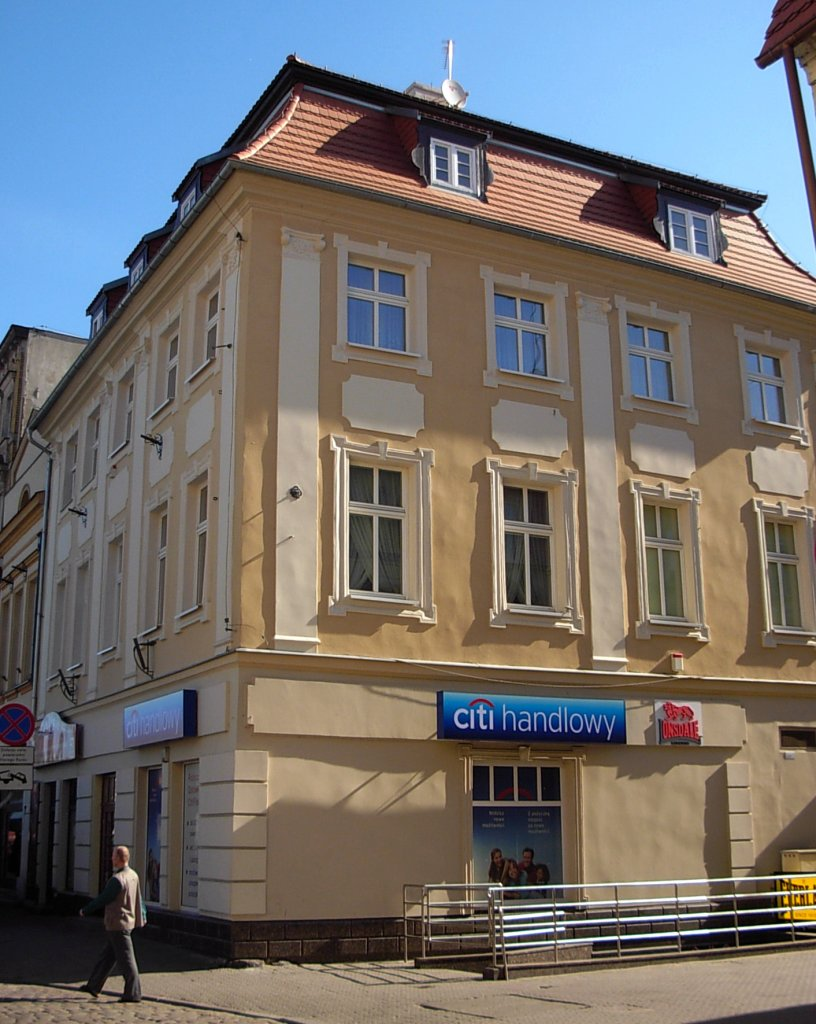
Facade on Magdzińskiego street

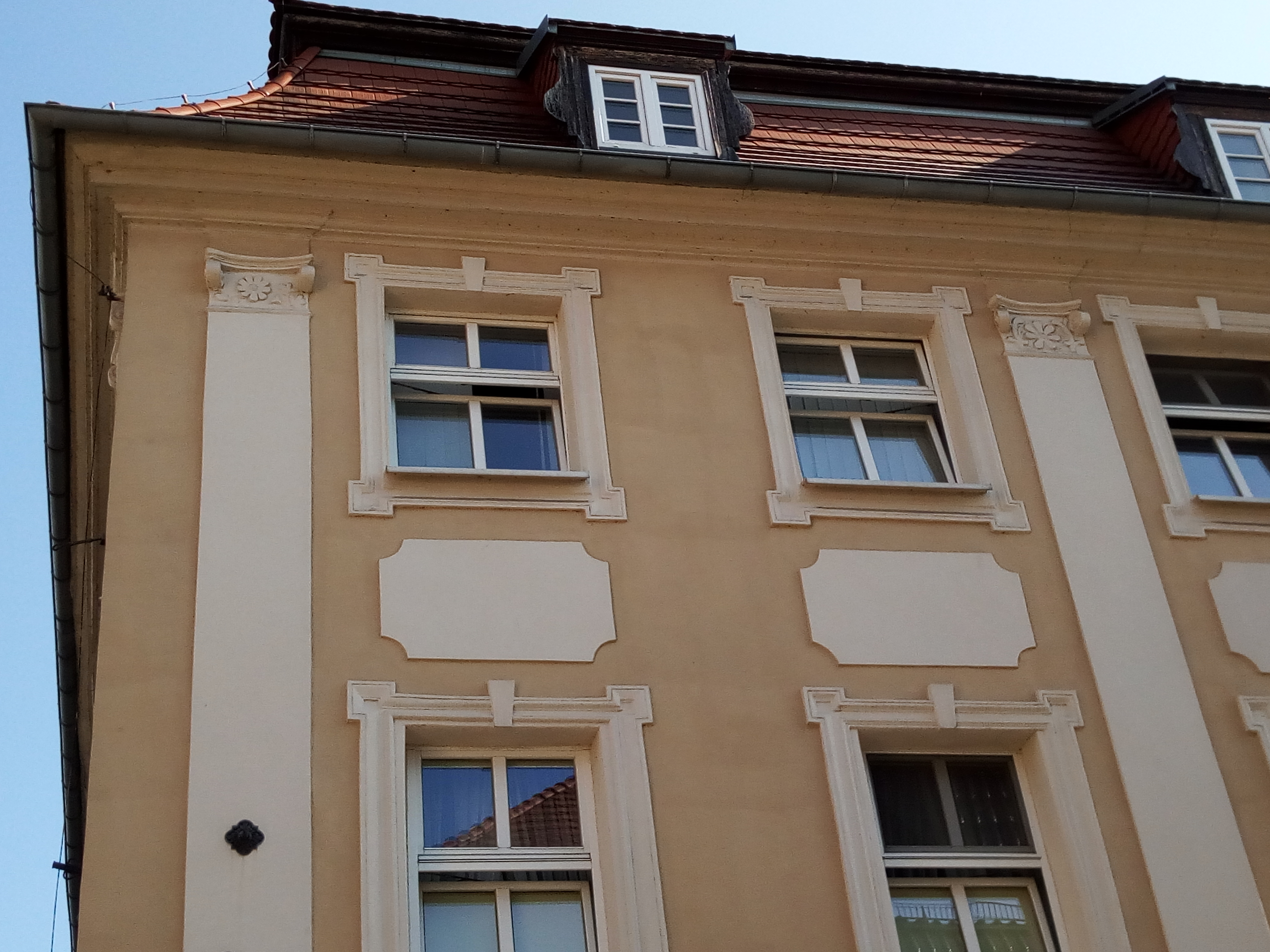
Facade detail with adorned pilasters

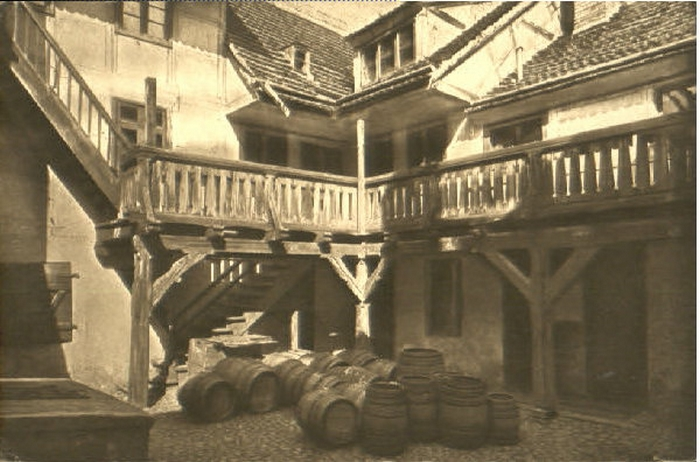
Back yard view of the tavern Pod Złotym Łososiem at Nr.27, ca 1910

=== Southern frontages ===
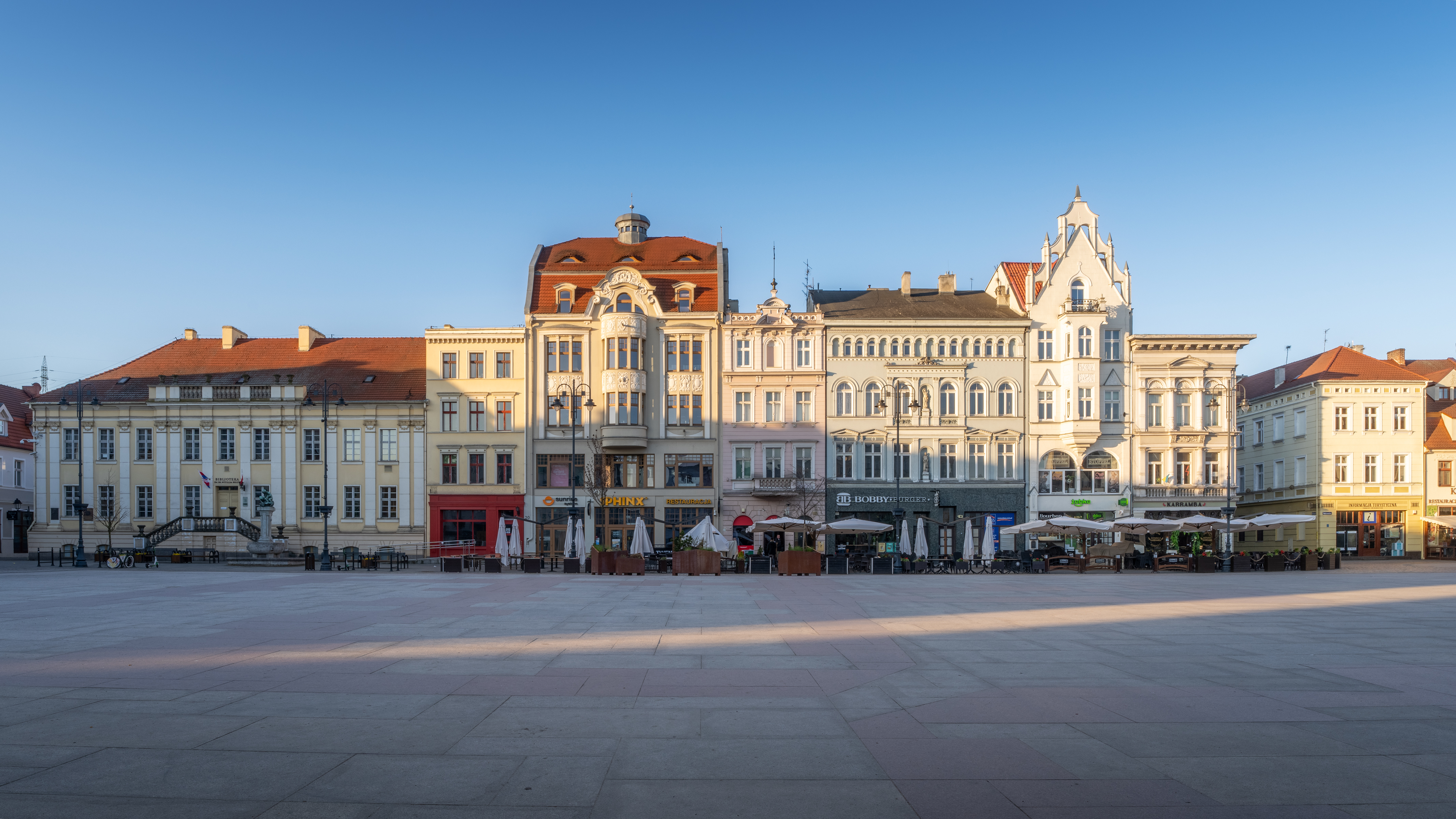
View of the southern frontages

House at 12, corner with 1 Stephen Báthory street
17th century, 1877
Registered on Kuyavian-Pomeranian Voivodeship Heritage List (Nr.A/350/1), 2 February 1993
Neo-Renaissance

The rebuilding in 1877 was ordered by Ludwig Badt, a merchant and vinegar producer, living at abutting house at Nr. 14, then Friedrichplatz 7. His successor, Theodor Thiel, ran there a clothing and decoration shop from the end of the 1880s until the beginning of the 20th century. From 1993 to 2014, an art café, Węgliszek, was established on the ground floor. Węgliszek originates from the so-called name of one of Pan Tardowski's mischievous friends. The figure of the devil can still be observed on the motifs of the facades, in particular in one of the stained glass windows adorning today's establishment.

The tenement owes its present appearance to a thorough reconstruction in the Neo-Renaissance spirit, realized in 1877, according to the design of Gustav Weihe. The facades are topped with an extended cornice on corbels, with a convoluted frieze made of pearled ornaments. The building still possesses gothic cellars, where elements of a 15th-century pub activity have been discovered.

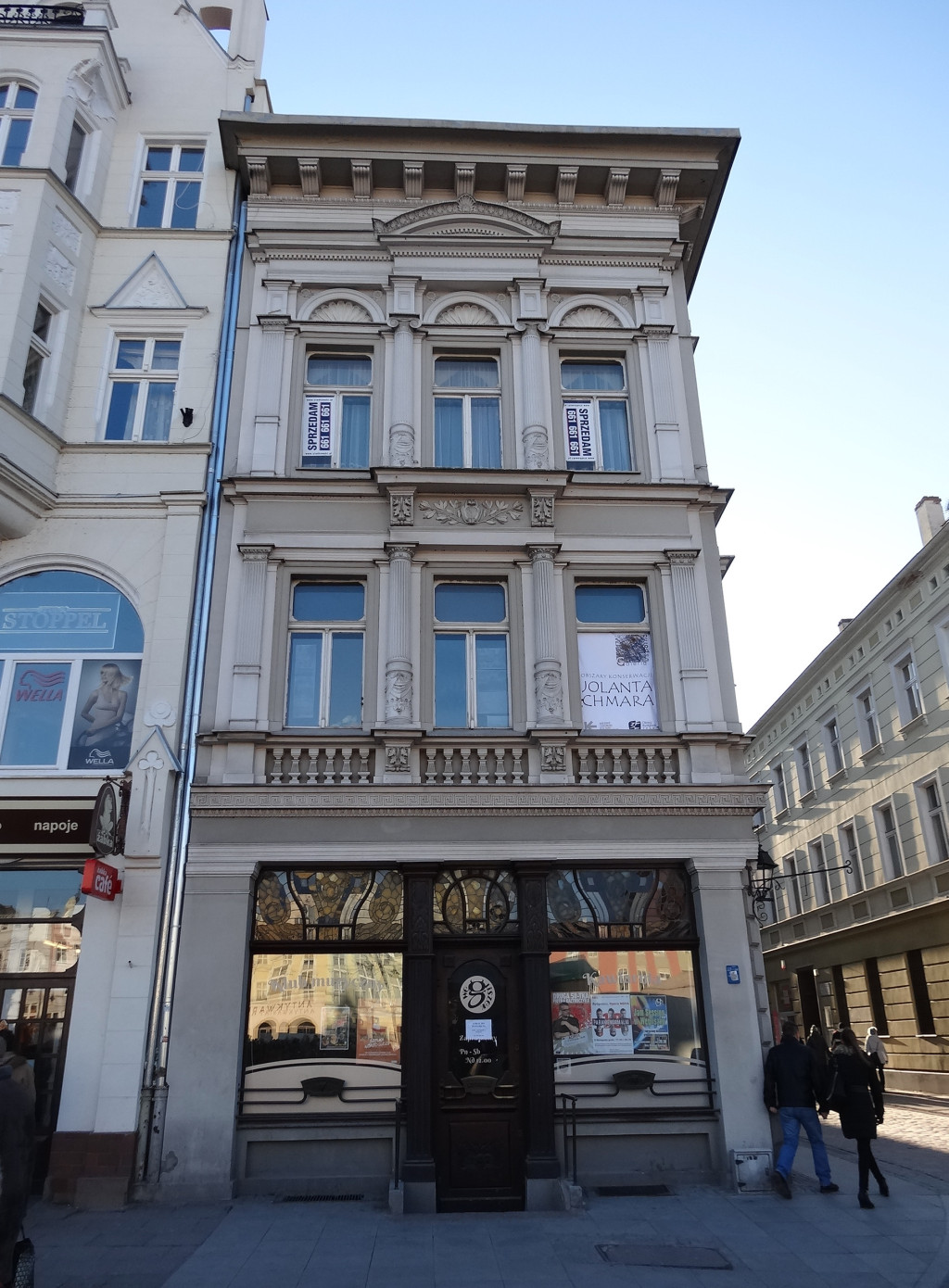
Facade on the market place

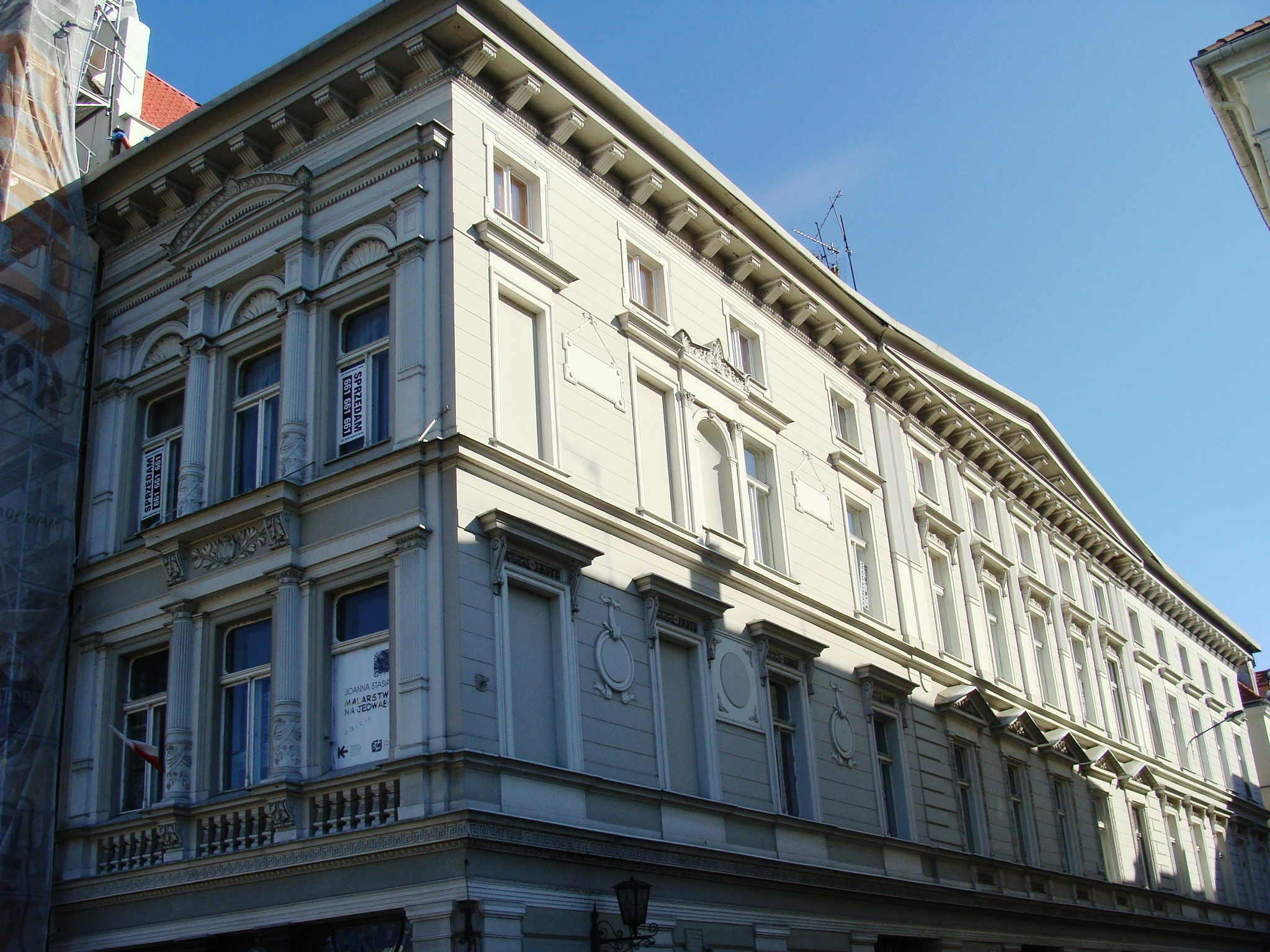
Facade on Stephen Báthory street

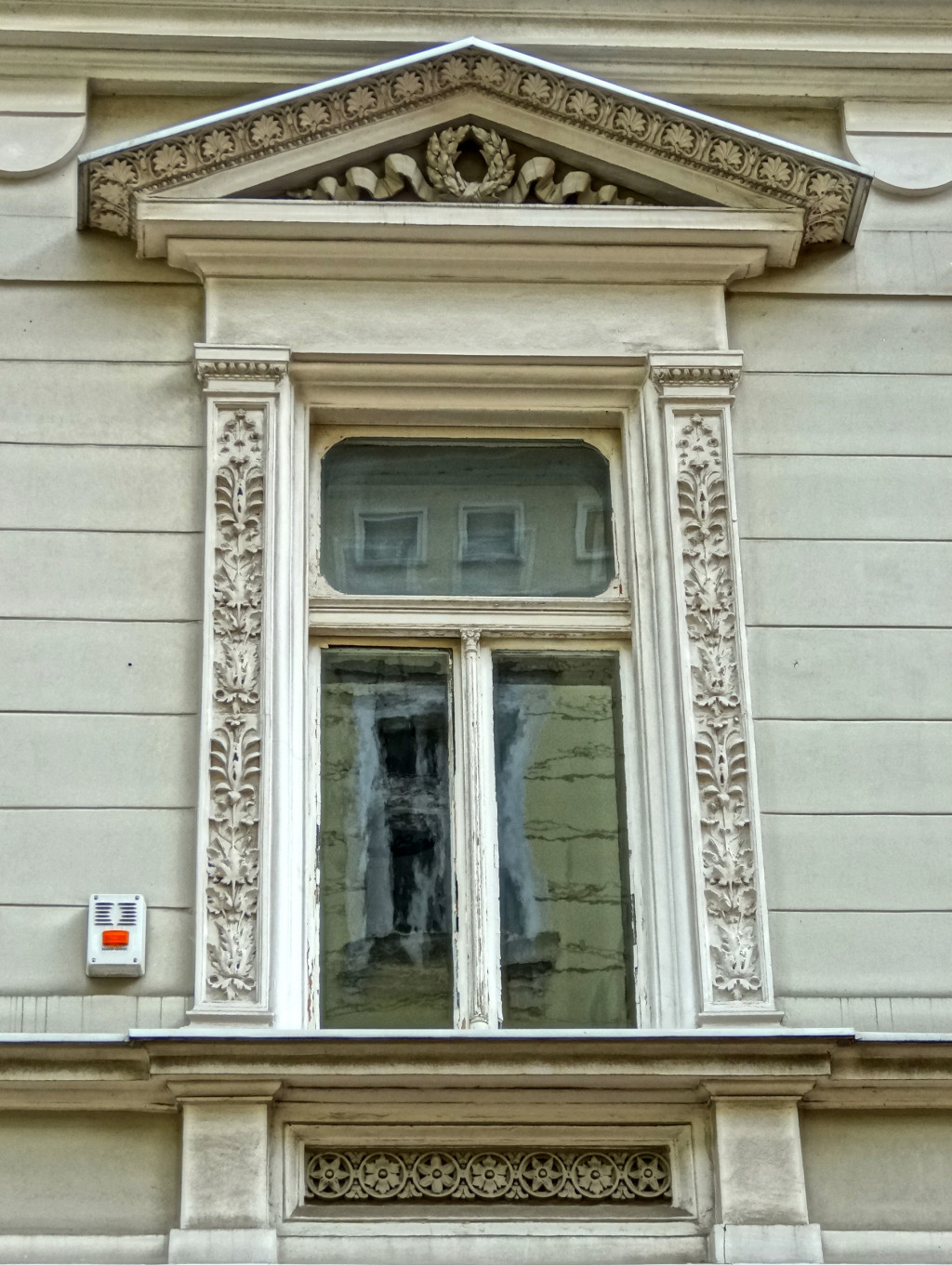
Window motifs

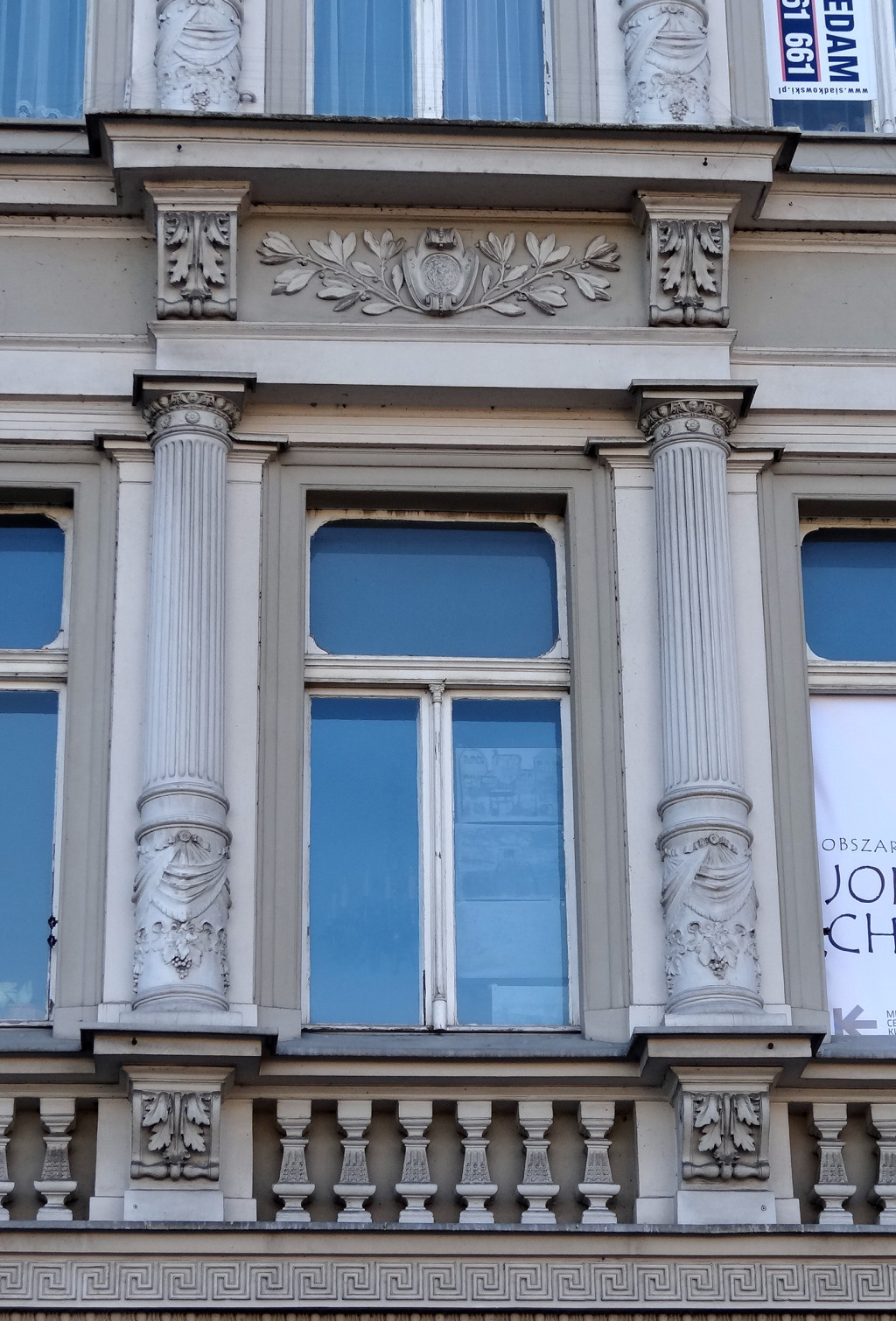
Columns, balustrade and adorned lintel

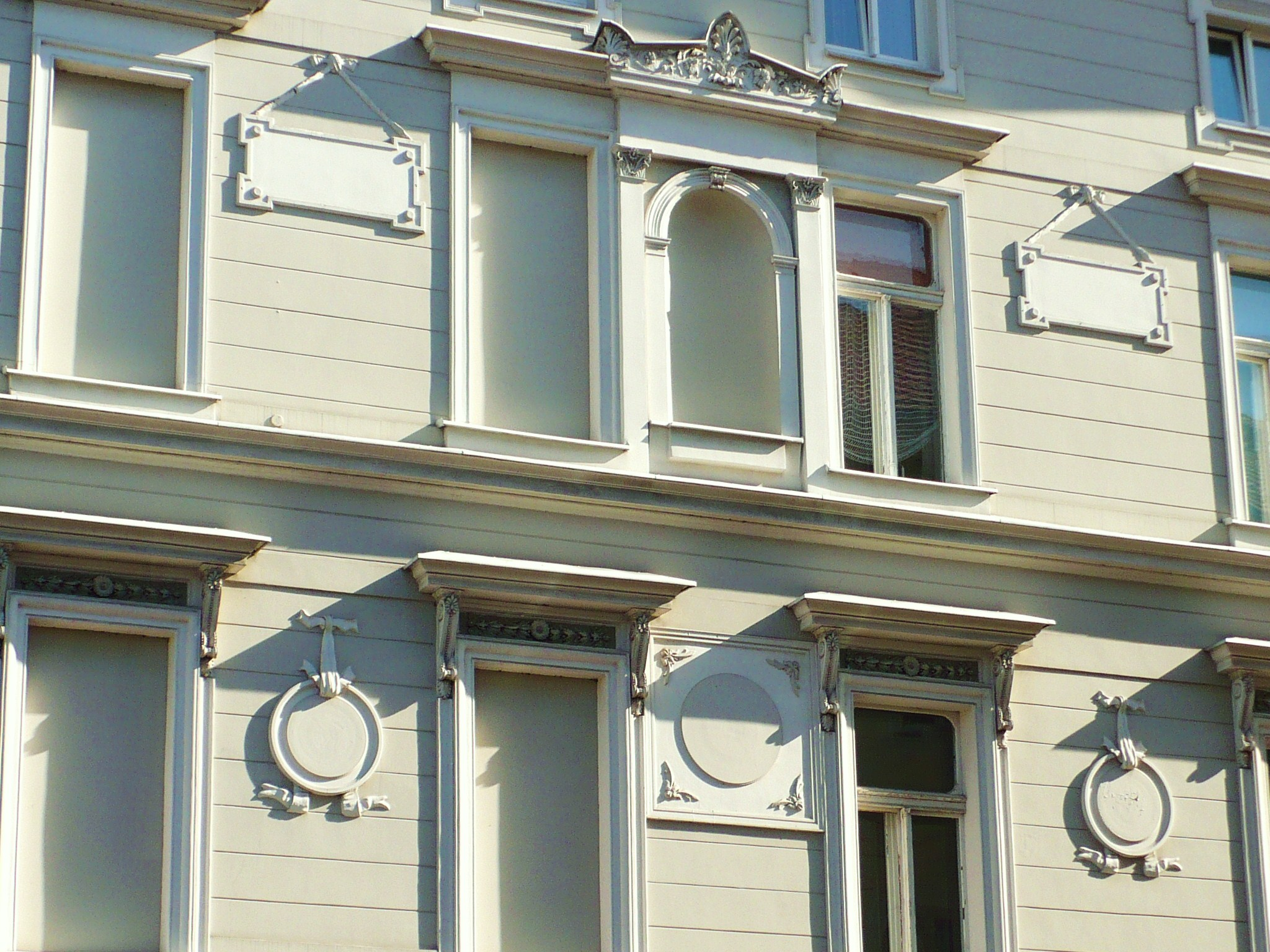
Neo-Renaissance motifs on Stephen Báthory street

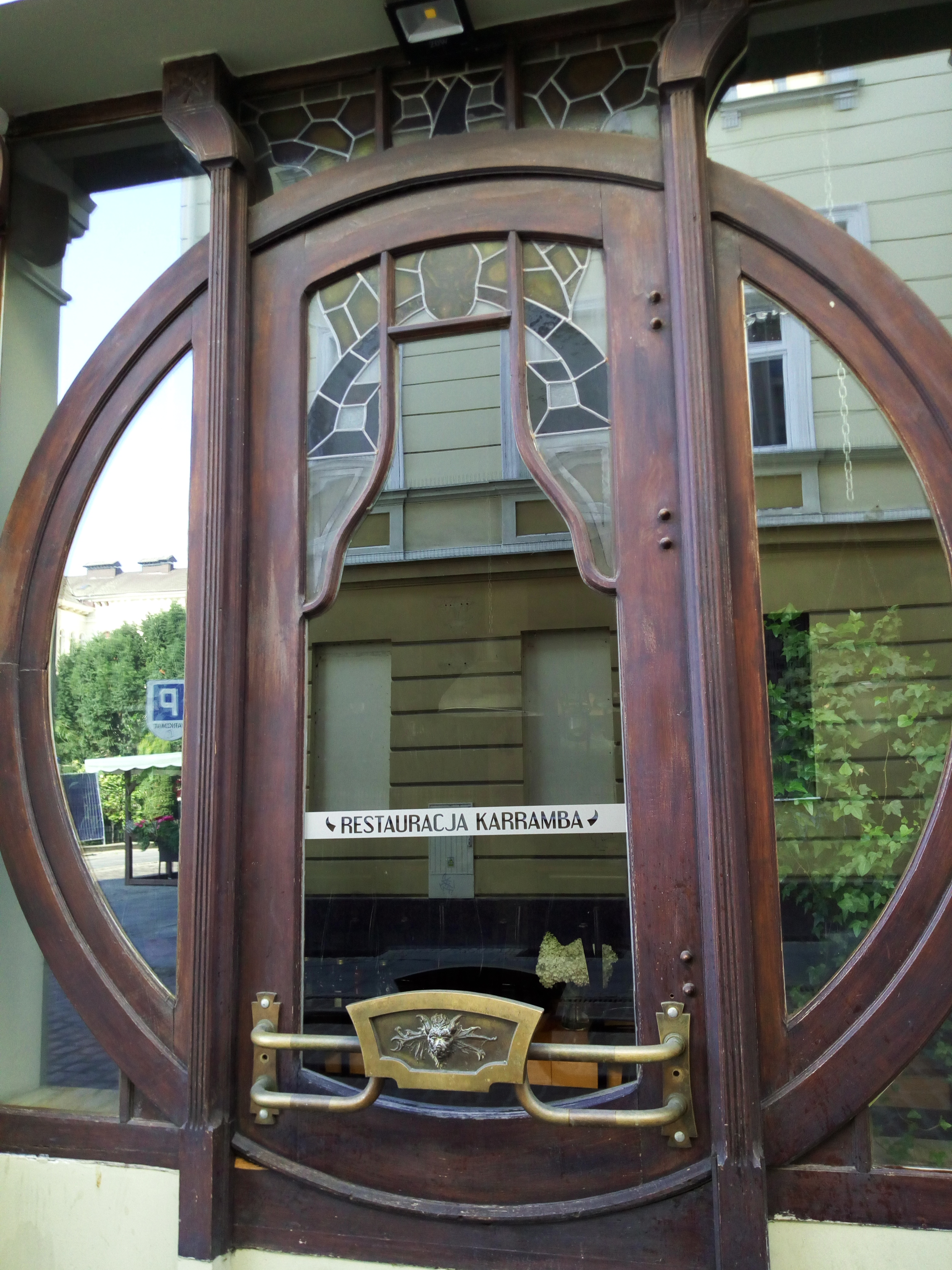
Devil figures

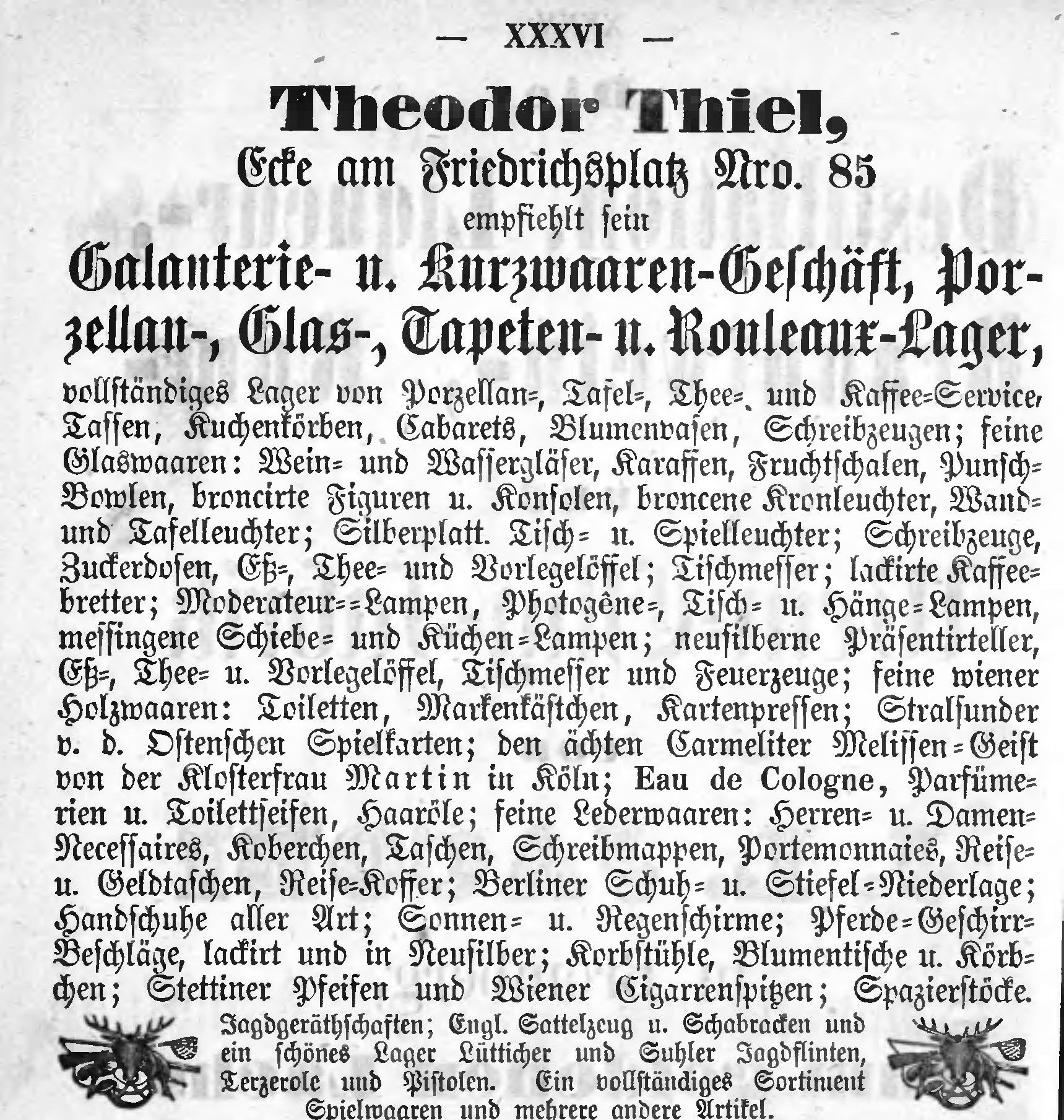
Advertising for Theodor Thiel's shop ca 1860s

House at 14
17th century, 1901
Eclecticism

In the 1880s, Ludwig Badt, a merchant and vinegar producer, lived as a landlord here, while owning the building at Nr. 12. In 1901, Sally Schendell, a merchant, had the house rebuilt with today's outlook. At that time, a clothing shop was housed on the ground floor. After WWI and the end of Prussian occupation, a Polish shop of clothing owned by F. Chudziński stood there (1920–1923). In the early 1970s, the Medyk Club was housed in the preserved Gothic vaults of the cellars. It was one of the most popular clubs in Bydgoszcz, in the 1970s and 1980s, especially frequented by bohemian artists, flourishing with various musical forms: jazz, baroque, opera, sung poetry, piano recitals. The club closed in 1996.

The present shape of the building originates from a 1901 reconstruction. The frontage giving on the Old Market is peculiarly decorated, with a narrow bay window flouncing out the elevation, capped with plastered bat-shaped gargoyles supporting a tiny balcony. The jagged gable, unique on the square, draws attention.

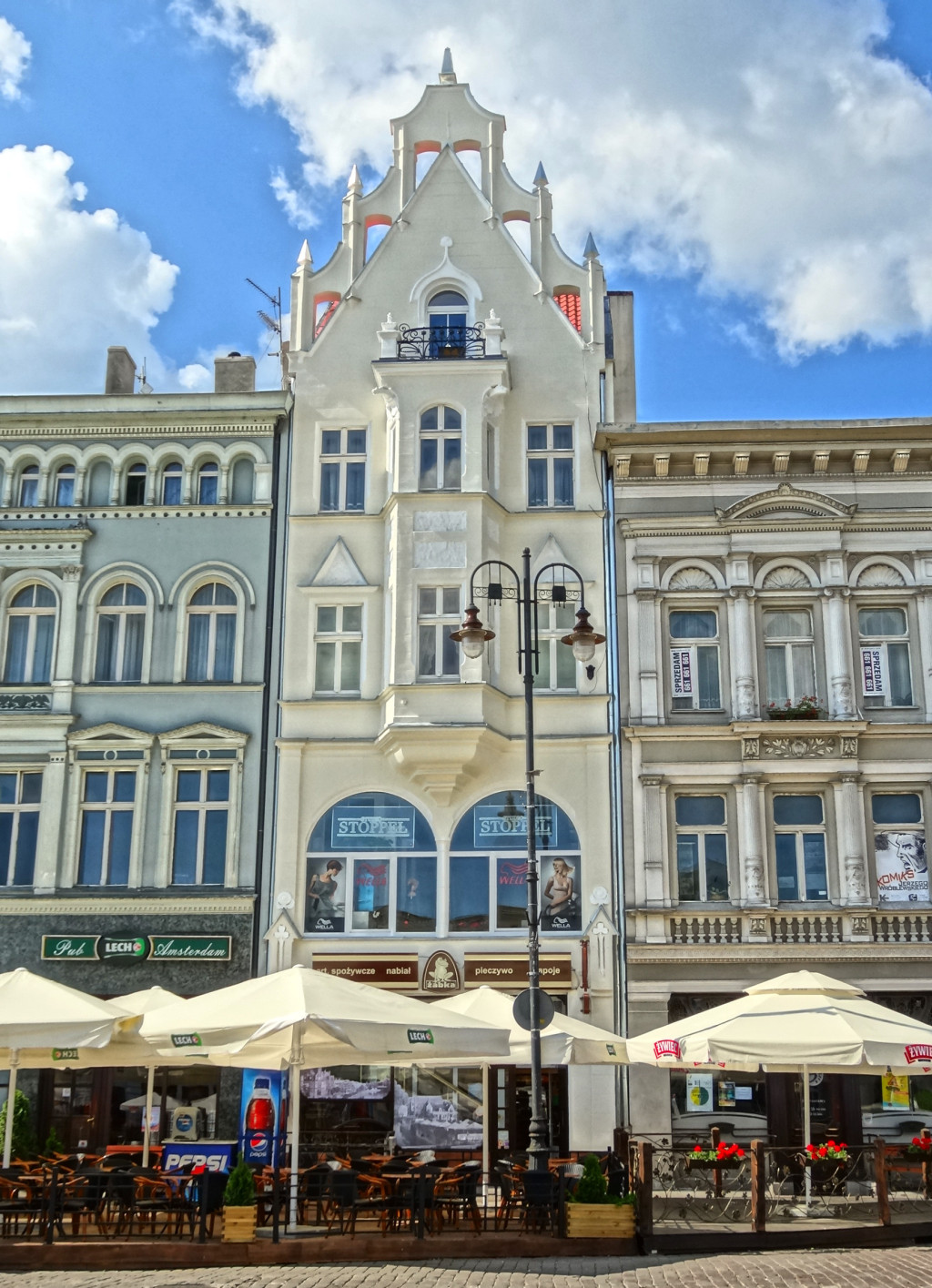
Main elevation on the square

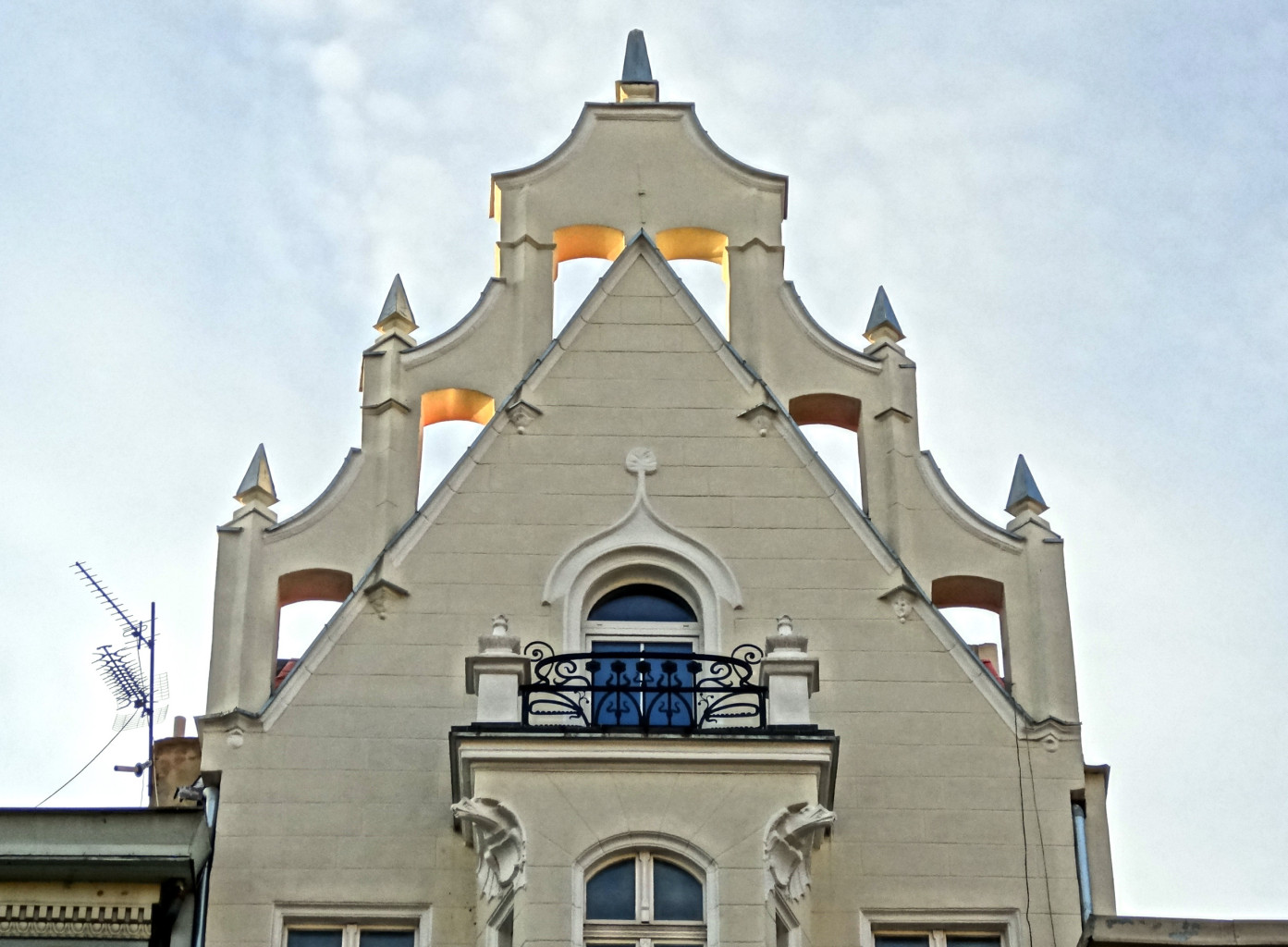
Jagged gable

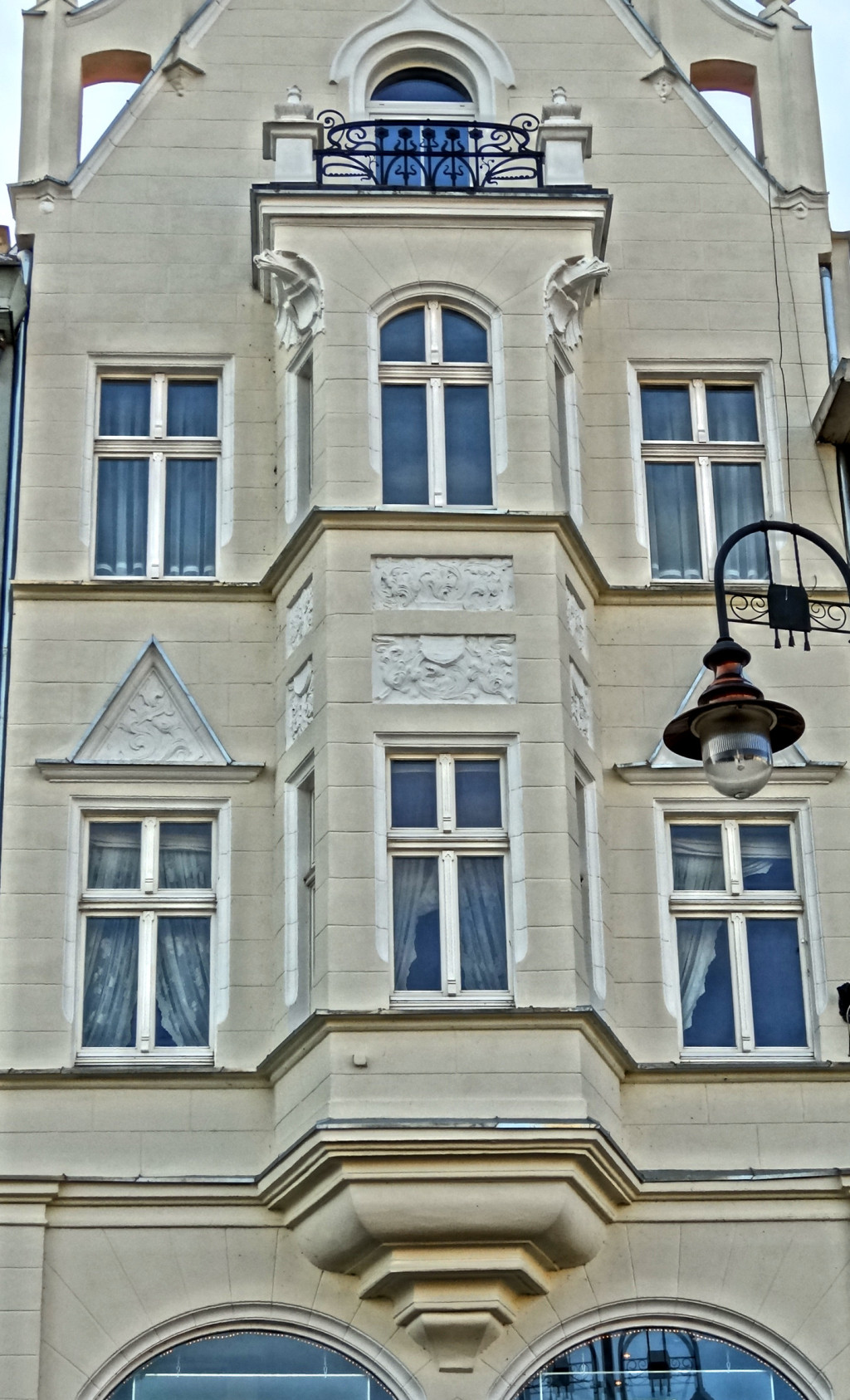
Bay-window on the square facade

Emil Gamm House at 16 – 3 Zaułek street
1860
Registered on Kuyavian-Pomeranian Voivodeship Heritage List (Nr.A/347/1), 5 January 1993
Neo-Renaissance

It has been the property of the Gamm family from the 1850s to the late 1920s. Emil Gamm was the founder of a soap manufactory, registered at then Markt Platz 79: he commissioned the reconstruction of the old building in 1860.

Main eye-catcher of the facade is a middle avant-corps, teeming with symbols and motifs. There, two allegorical figures of Fortune and Justice stand on pedestal in their niches, they are flanked by pilastered arched windows bearing figurative ornaments in cartouches. The avant-corps is topped by an eagle spreading wings.

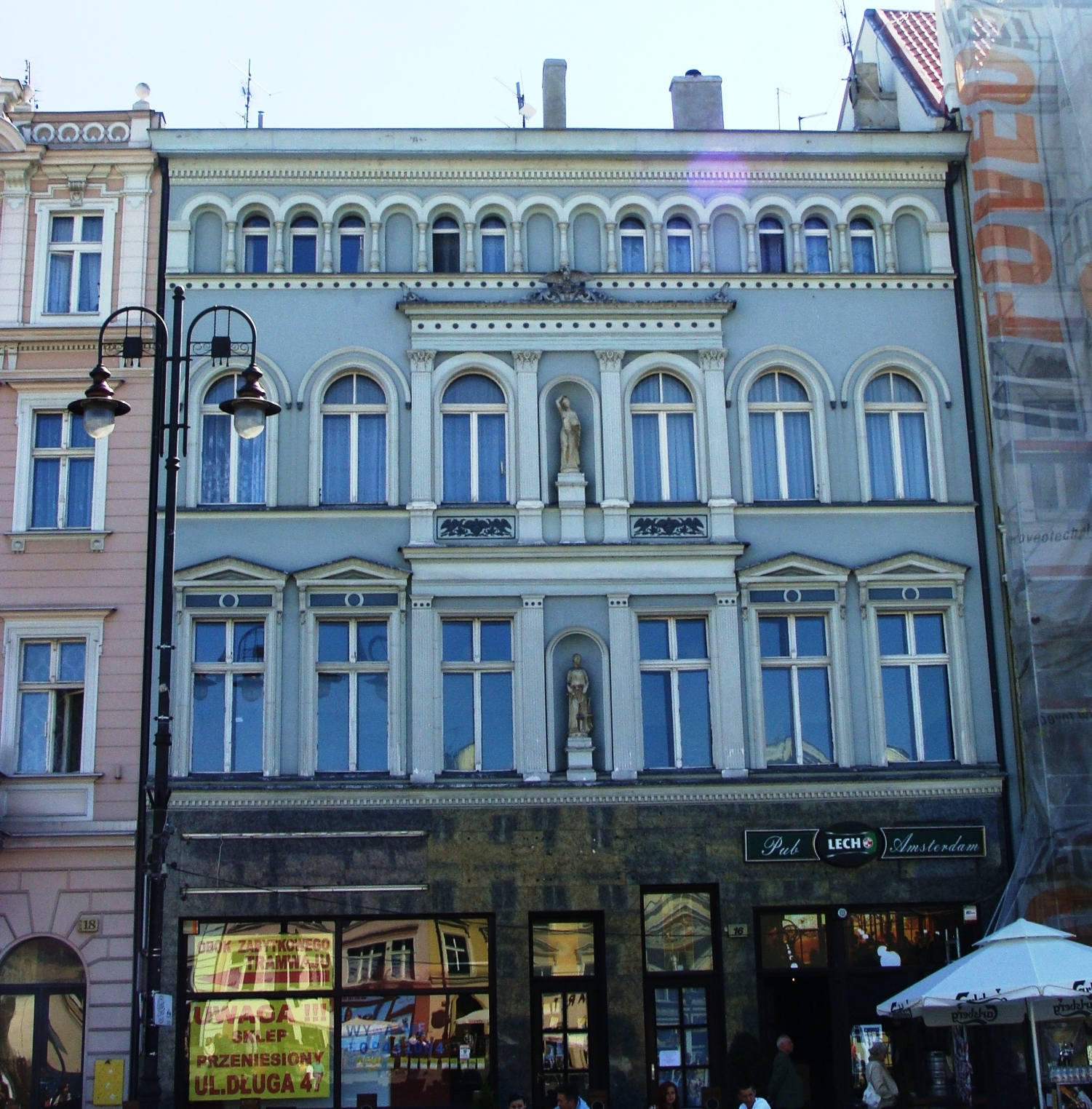
Main elevation on the place

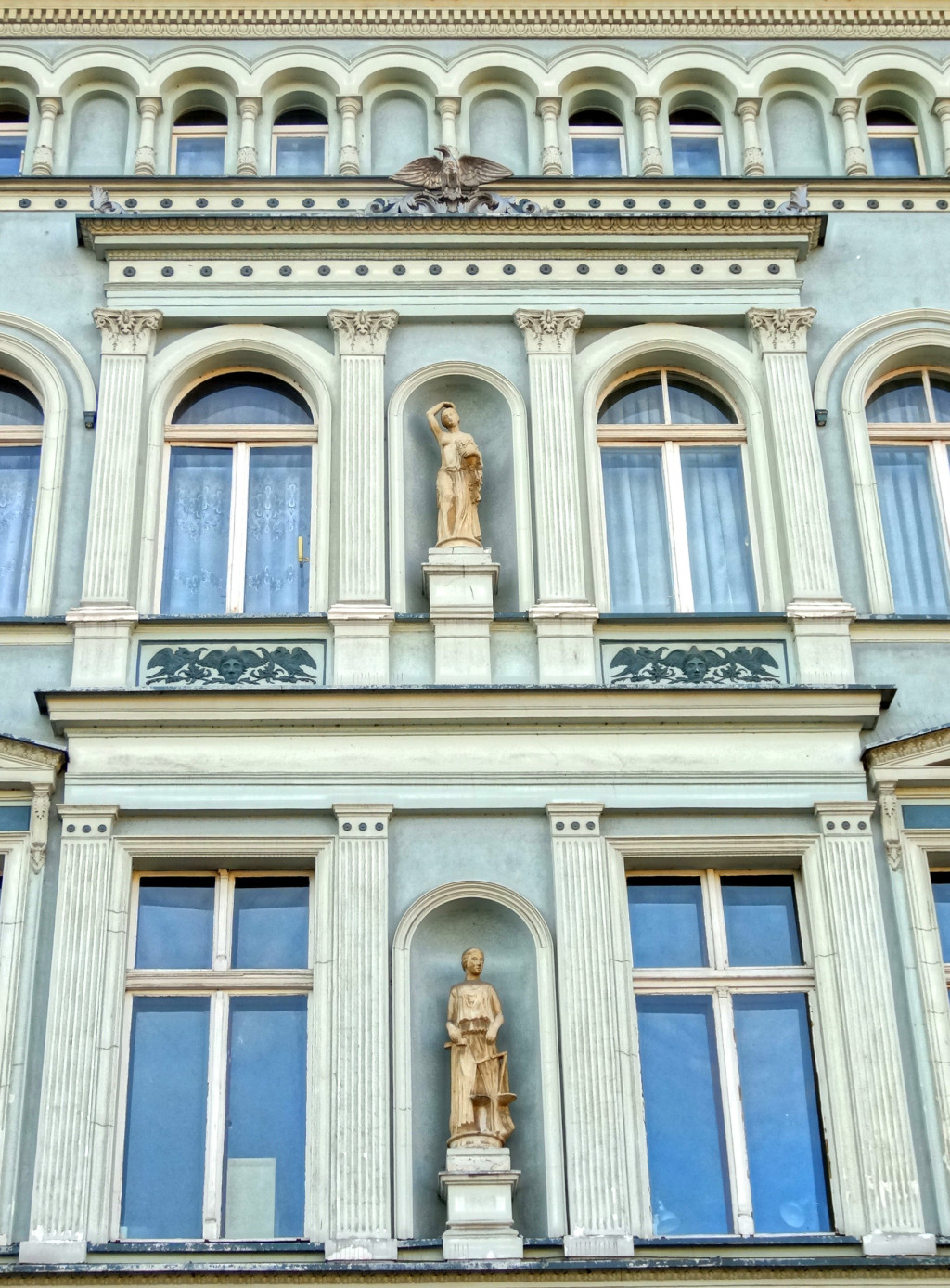
Decorated avant-corps

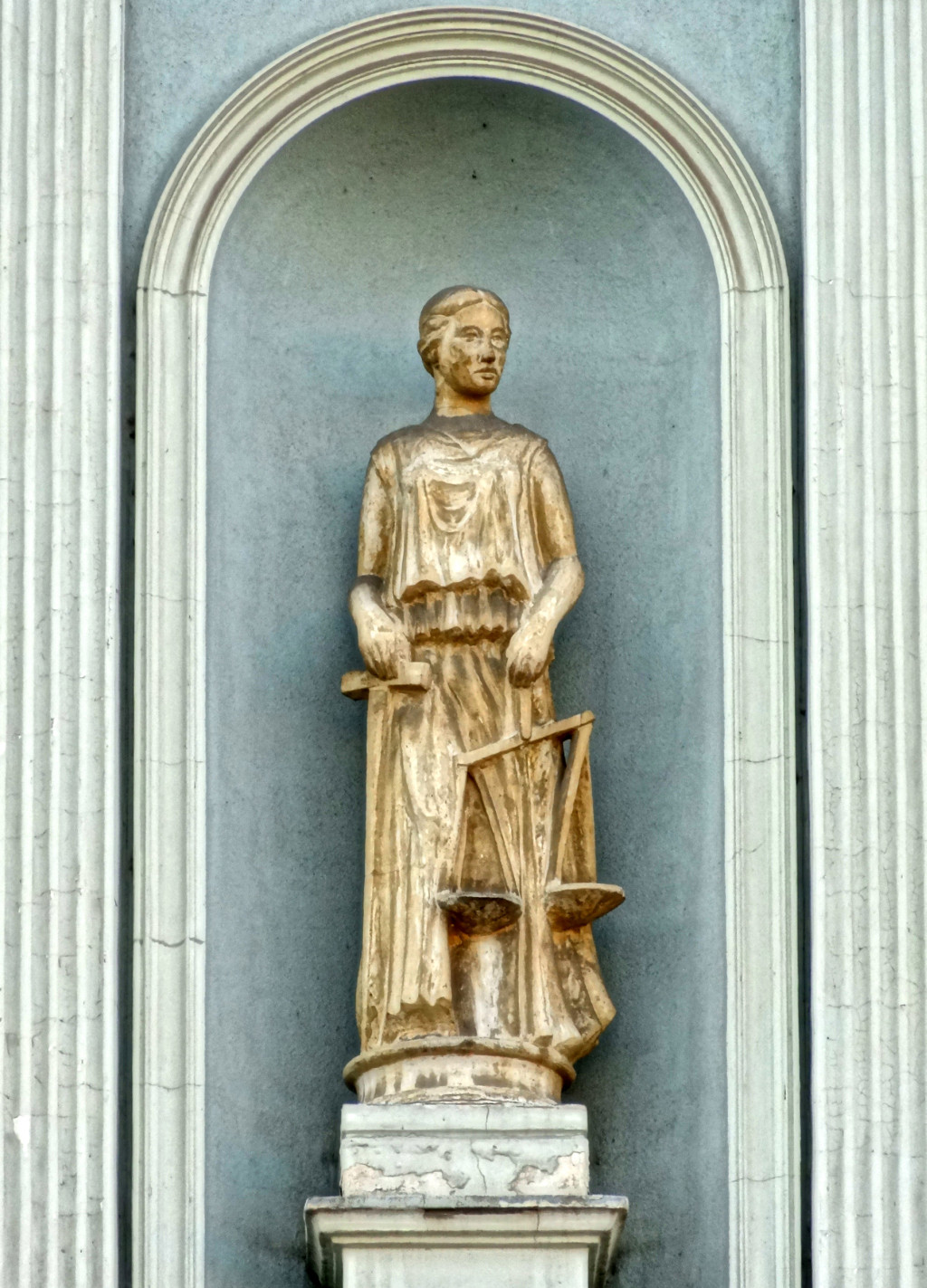
Allegory of Justice

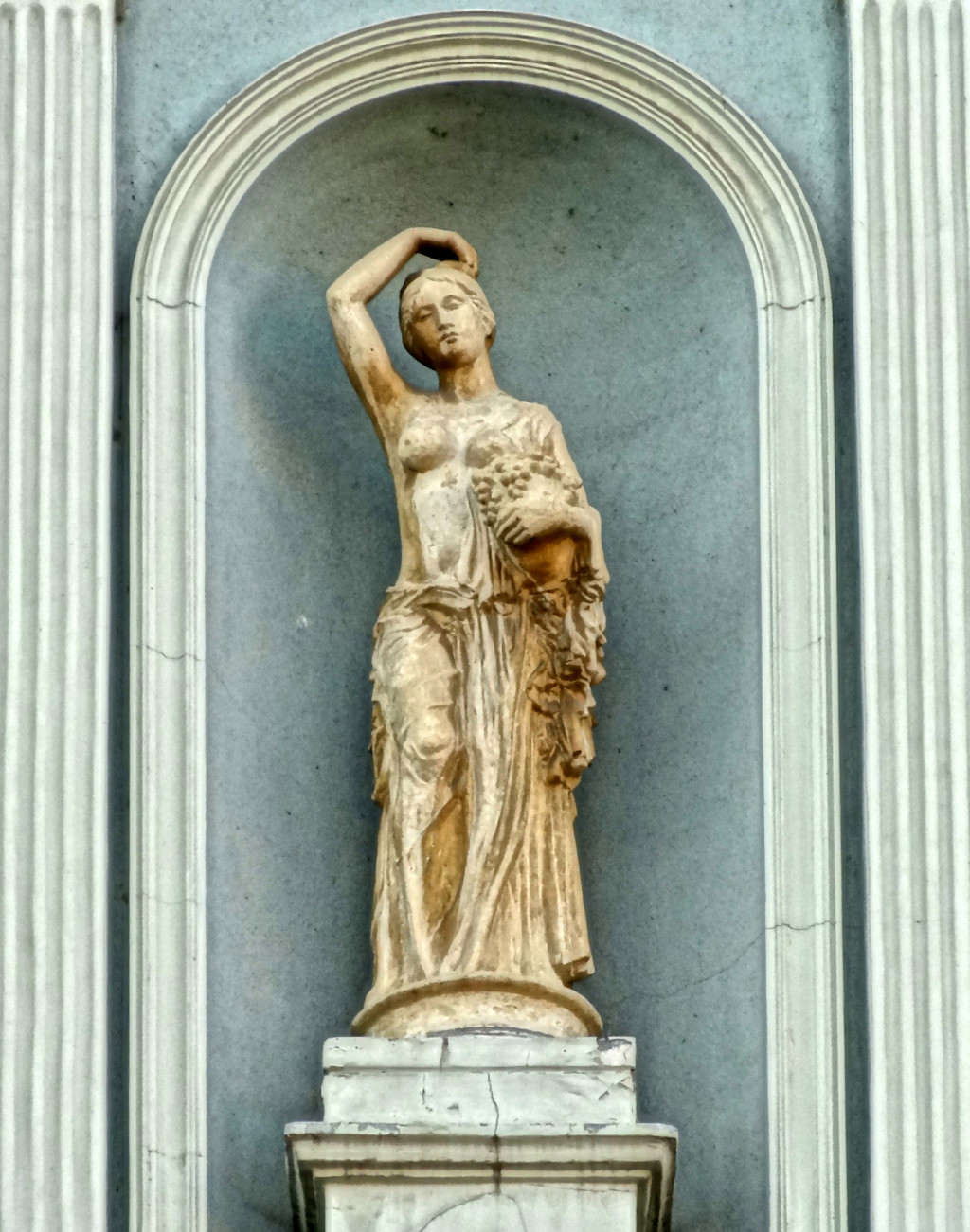
Allegoric sculpture of Fortune

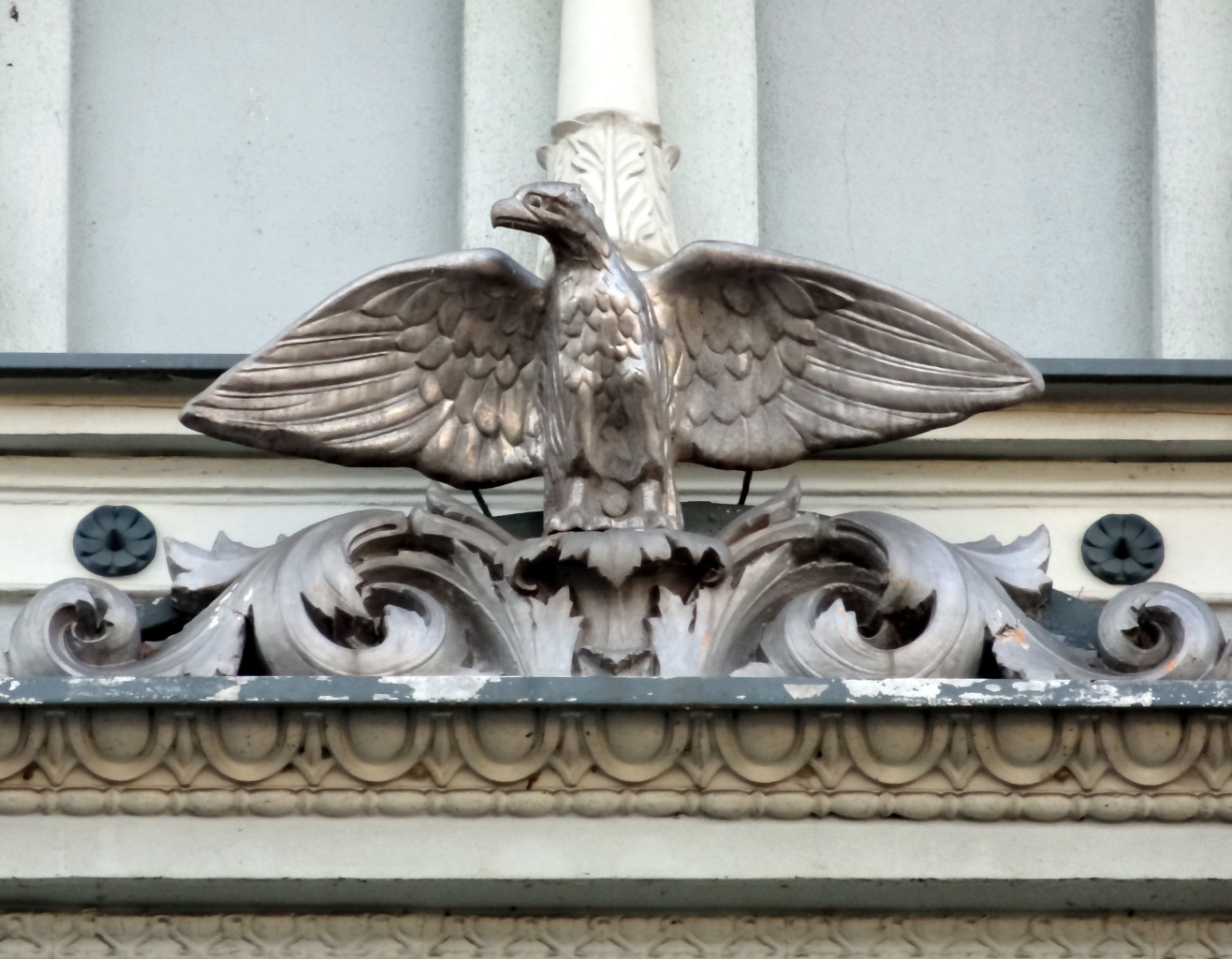
Eagle emblem

Eberle House at 18 – 5 Zaułek street
1898
Eclecticism

The house has been reconstructed under the direction of Gustav Eberle, who took over the delicatessen business from his relative Adolf. At the beginning of the 20th century, the establishment transformed to a wine cellar and bar. In 1991, it housed the local Amateur's Folk Art Gallery (Polish: Galeria Sztuki Ludowej i Nieprofesjonalnej), which moved in 2000 to Kościelecki Square 6.

The frontage displays bossage motifs on the ground floor and a heavy balcony girdled by a balustrade. Compliant to eclectic precepts, the top level is highlighted by an empty niche, high relief pilasters and crowned by ornaments (corbels, various pediments and a finial bearing the date of the building)

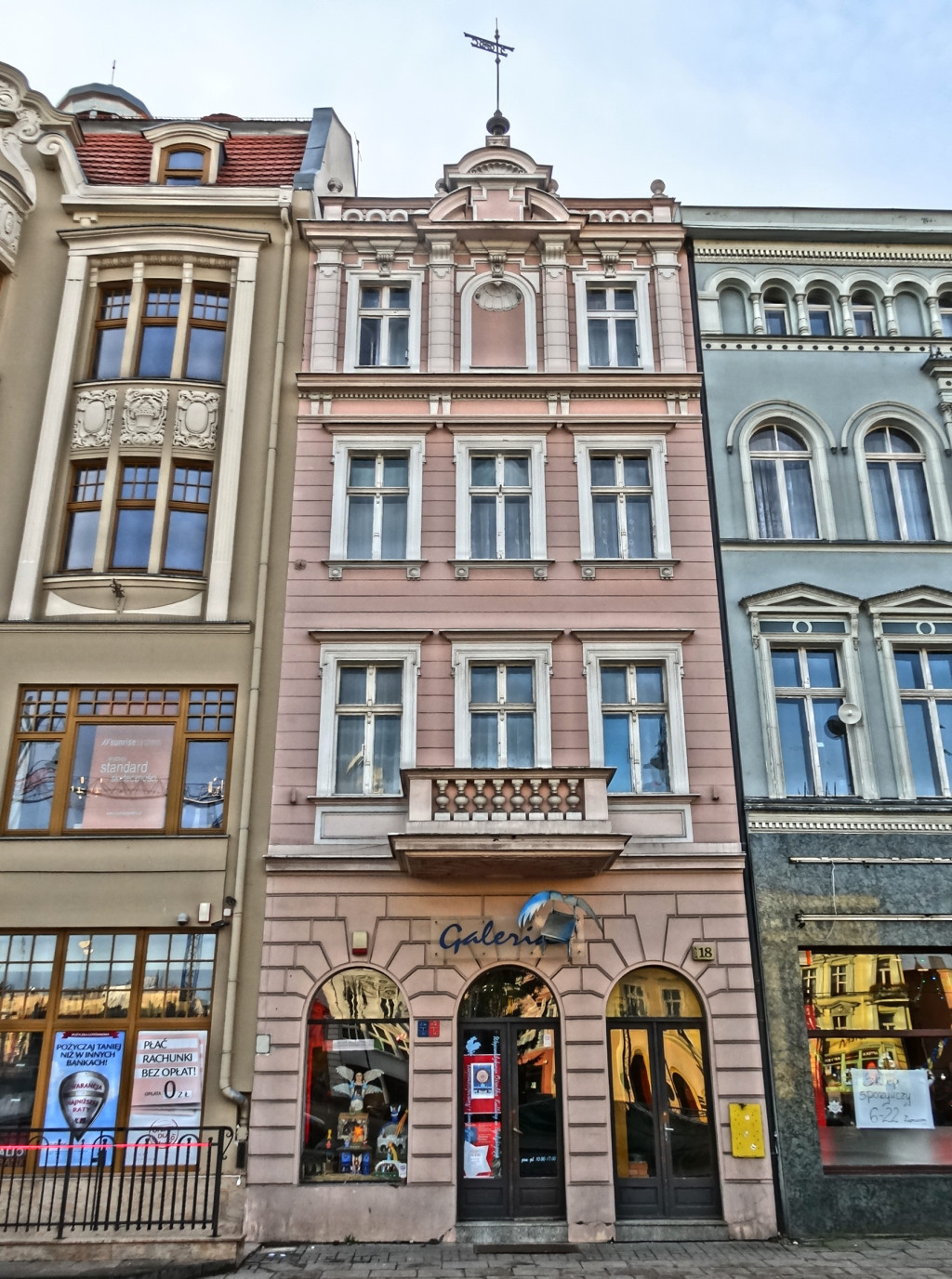
View of the facade from the square

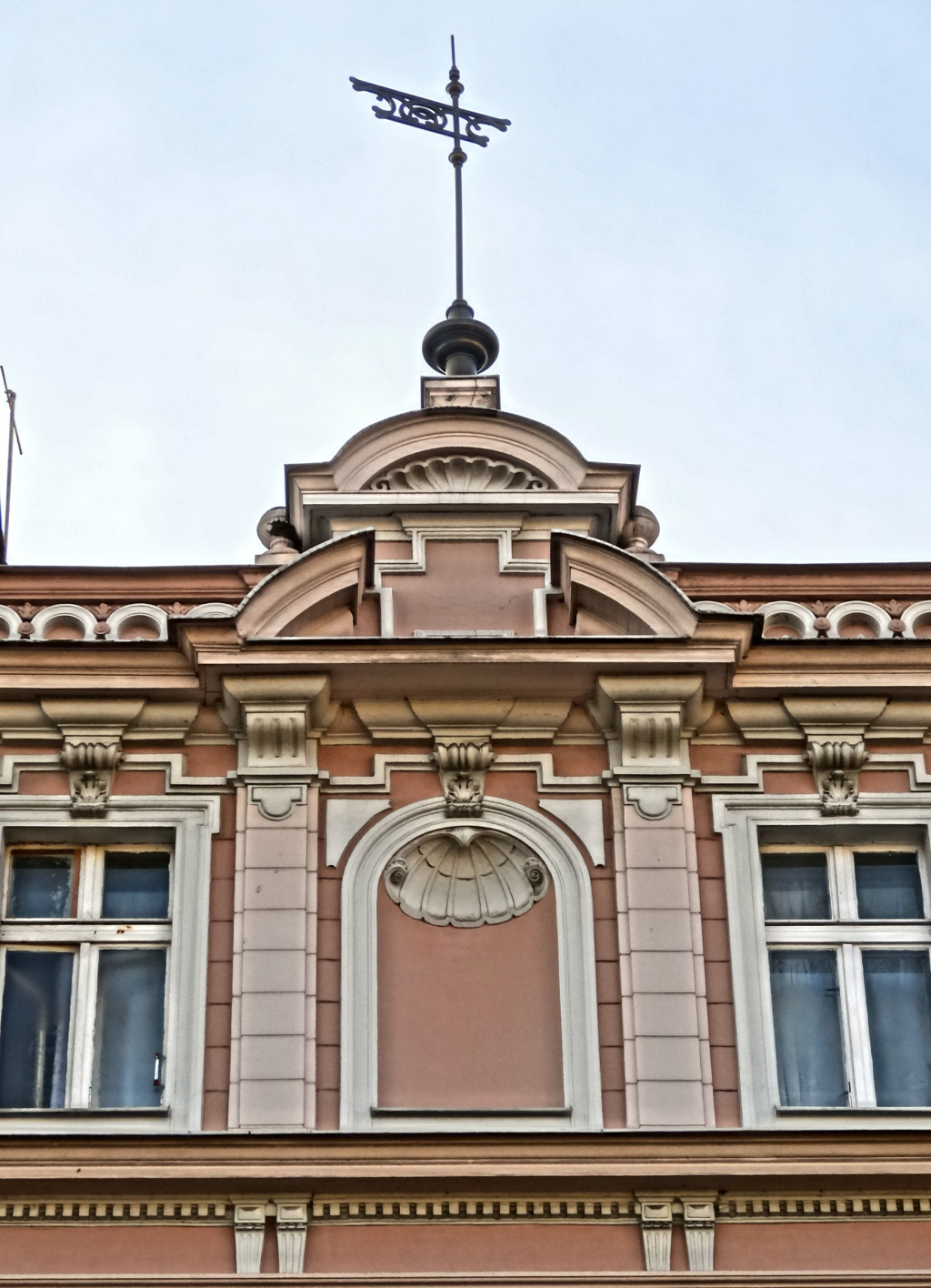
Adornement of the last level

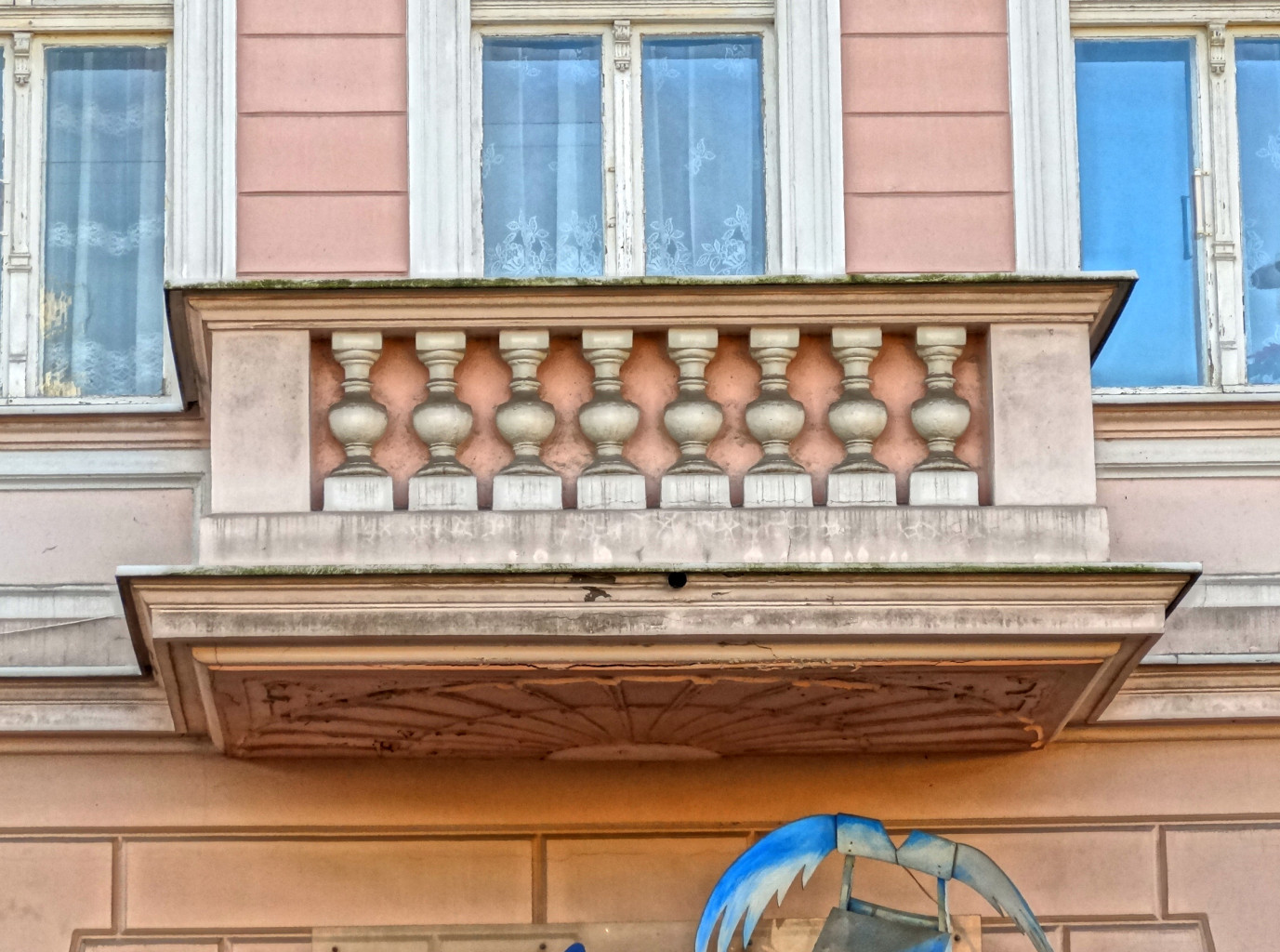
Detail of the balcony

Siuchniński's and Stobiecki's Department Store at 20 – 7 Zaułek street
1911
Art Nouveau

The initial building had Baroque features. In 1911, Mieczysław Siuchniński and Roman Stobiecki moved there from their initial shop at 3 New Market square. To that end, they had the old house razed and replaced by the actual edifice, on a design by Otto Müller. It was the largest department store in Bydgoszcz at that time and the only one where all the staff was Polish. Other retailing stores at the time were Kaufhaus Conitzer & Söhne at Gdańska Street 15 and Modehaus Bromberg at Gdańska Street 10.

The tenement features the canons of Berlin Secession, very fashionable in the 1910s. Floral motifs, mascarons portraying ugly faces are part of the facade decoration, ornamenting the round bay window, between pilasters or up to the front gable. A figure of Mercury, god of merchants, appears among the bay window elements.

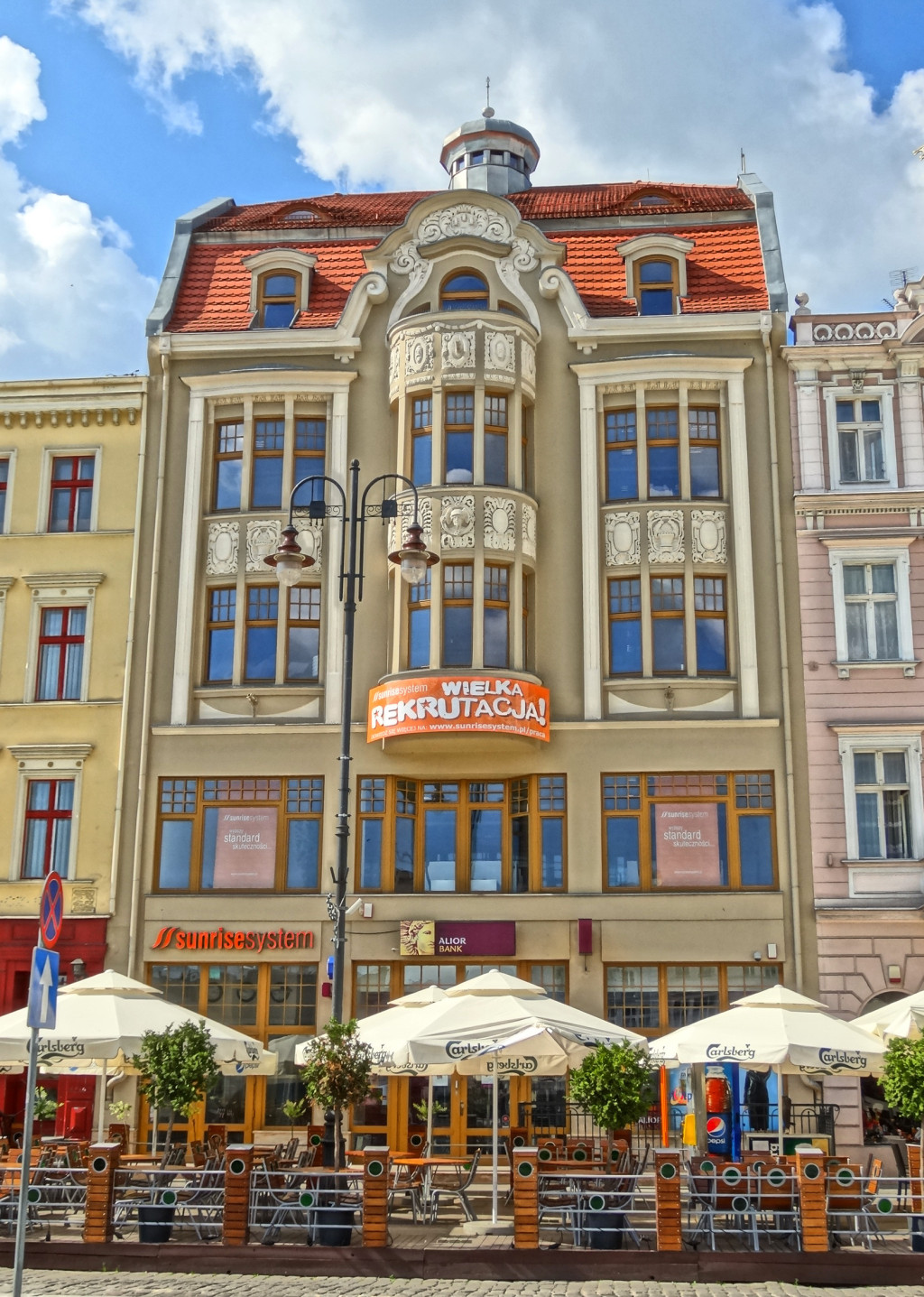
Main frontage

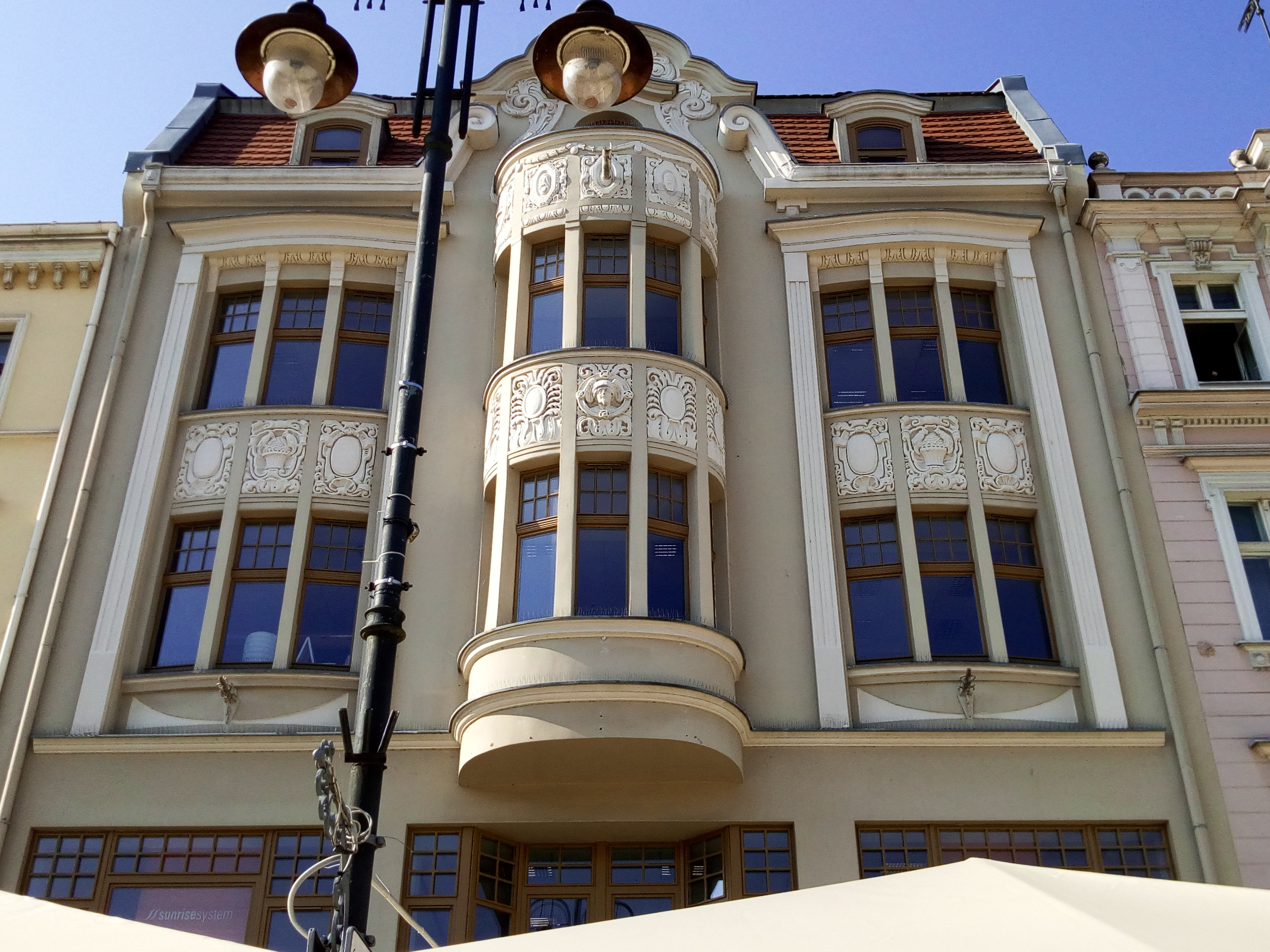
Bay window detail

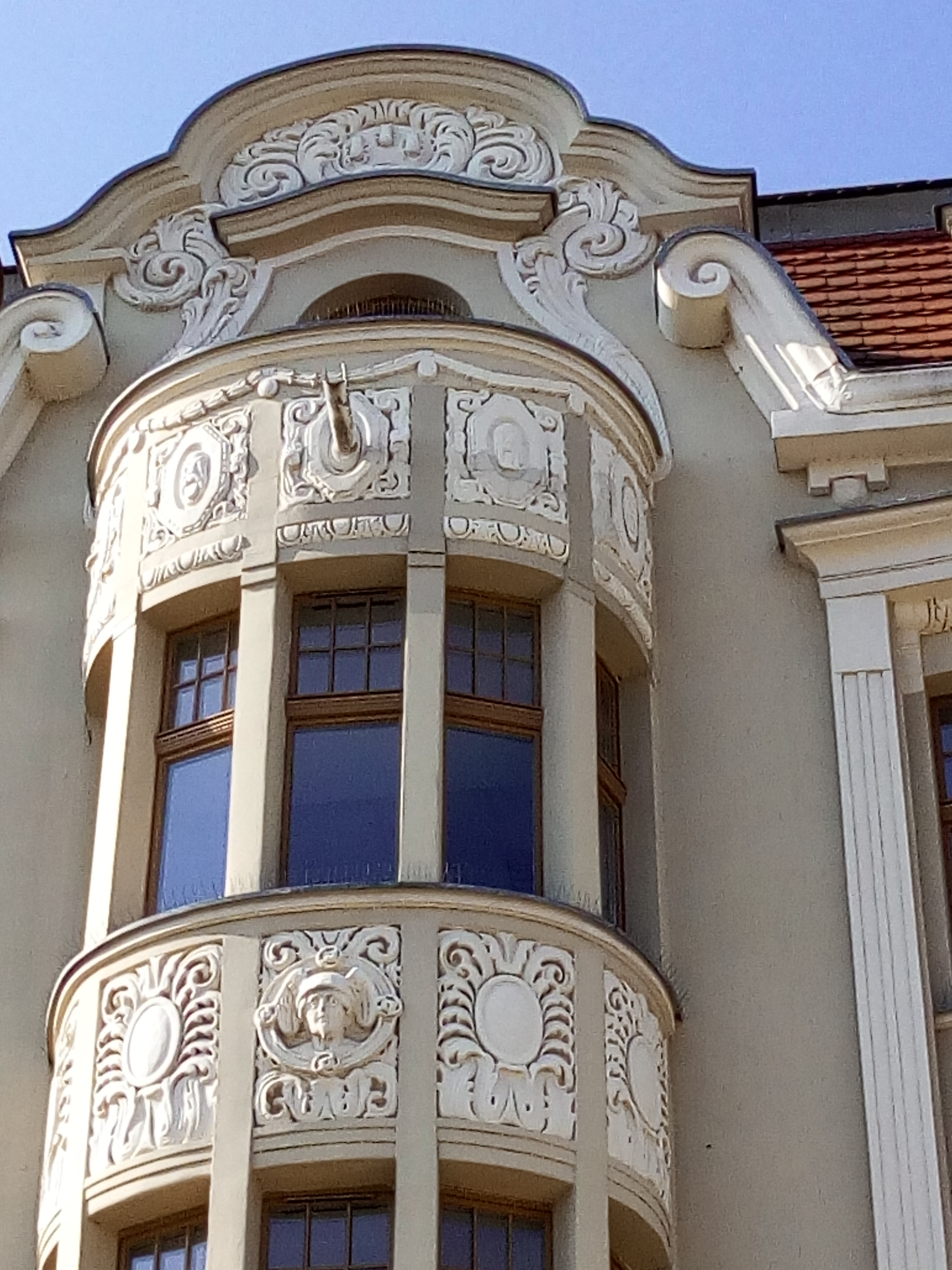
Motifs details

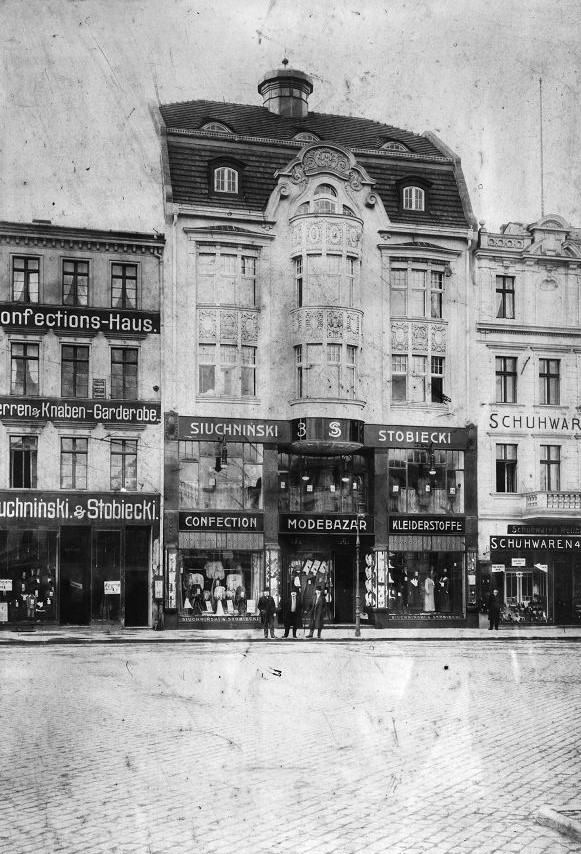
Picture of Siuchniński and Stobiecki Dpt Store ca 1912

House at 22 – 9 Zaułek street
First half of the 19th century
Registered on Kuyavian-Pomeranian Voivodeship Heritage List (Nr.A/299/1), 4 February 1992
Neoclassical architecture

The tenement house has been rebuilt in 1825–1850, making it one of the oldest on the southern frontage. From the 1870s until the turn of the 20th century, there was a confection shop run by Gustaw Lewy. Then, between 1911 and the start of WWII, the building was part of the Siuchniński and Stobiecki Department Store.

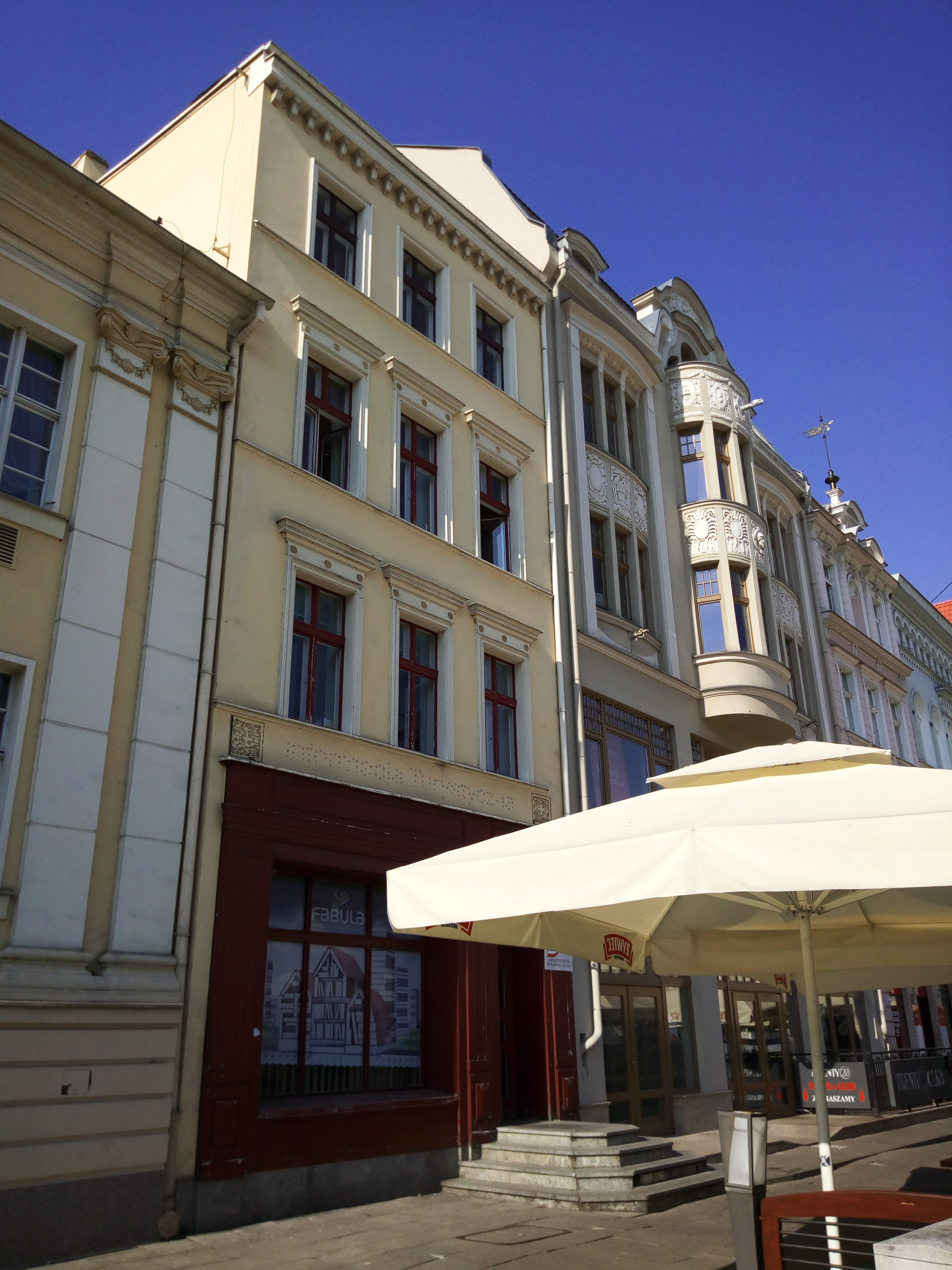
Facade of Nr.22 on the square

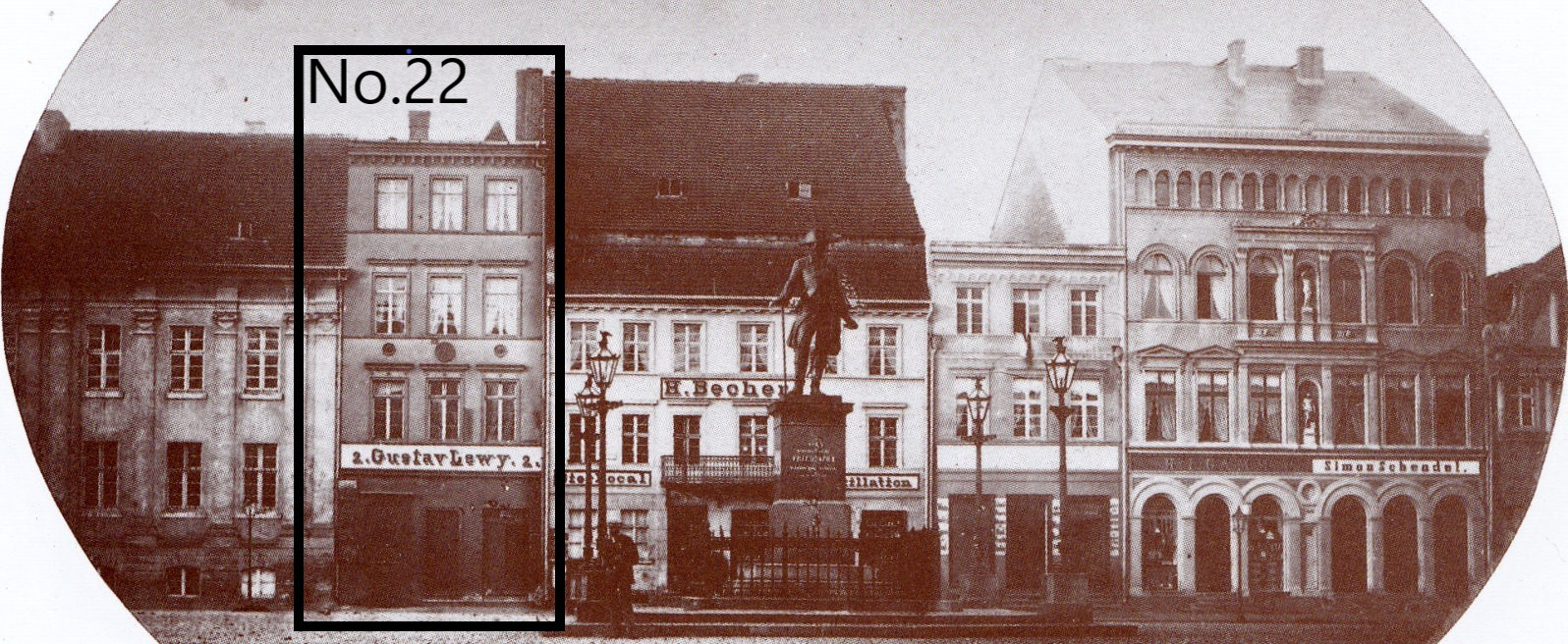
View of southern frontages ca 1870, with Gustaw Lewy's store highlighted

Building at 24 – 11 Zaułek street, corner with Jan Kazimierza street
1774
Registered on Kuyavian-Pomeranian Voivodeship Heritage List (Nr.A/868), 3 September 1953
Rococo, Neoclassical architecture

The Provincial and City Public Library-"Dr. Witold Bełza" is housed in historical buildings located between the Old Market square and Długa street. It is the oldest (1903) library in activity in the Kuyavian-Pomeranian Voivodeship, registered on the Kuyavian-Pomeranian Voivodeship Heritage List. Since 2002, it bears the name of Witold Bełza.

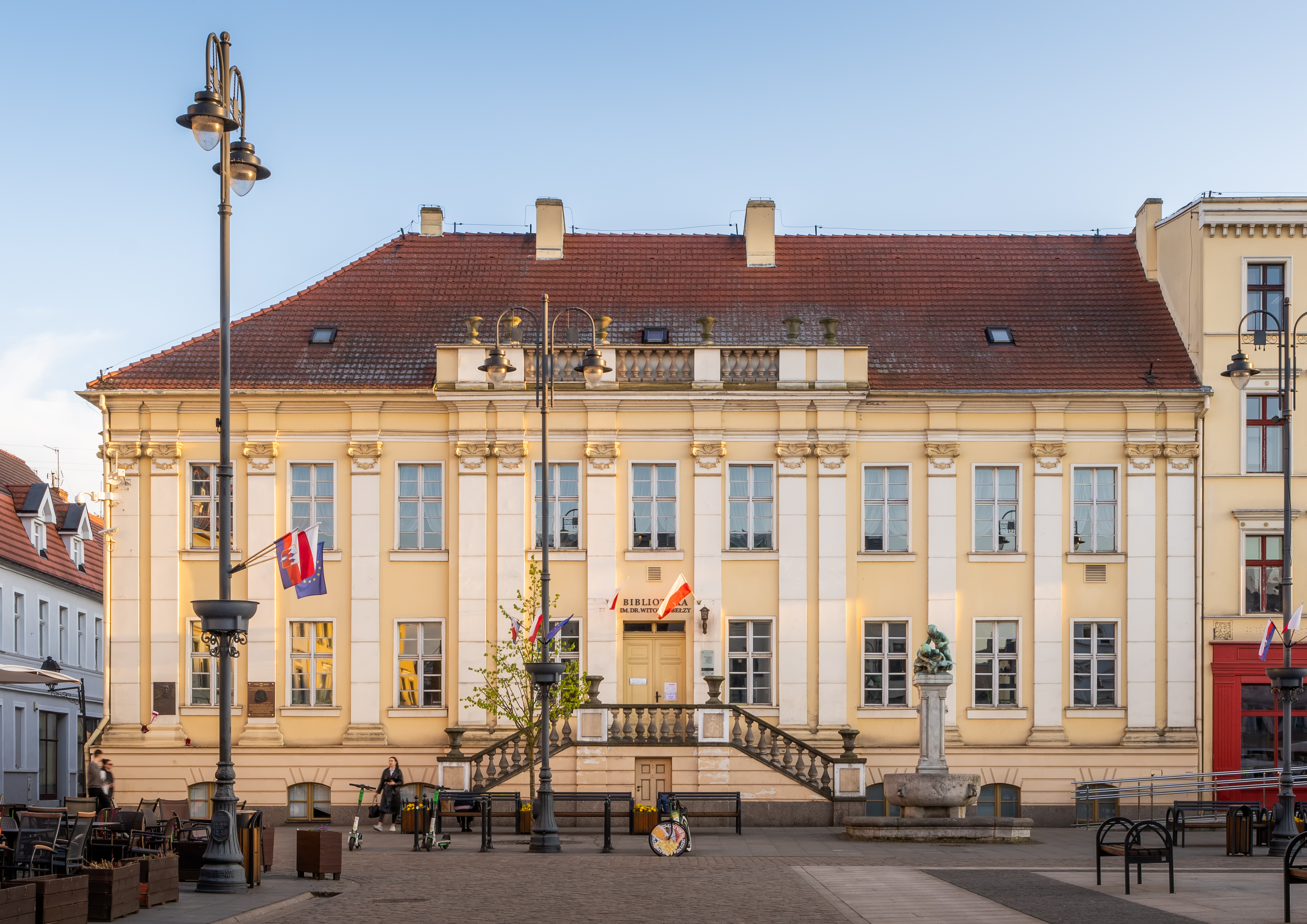
View from the square

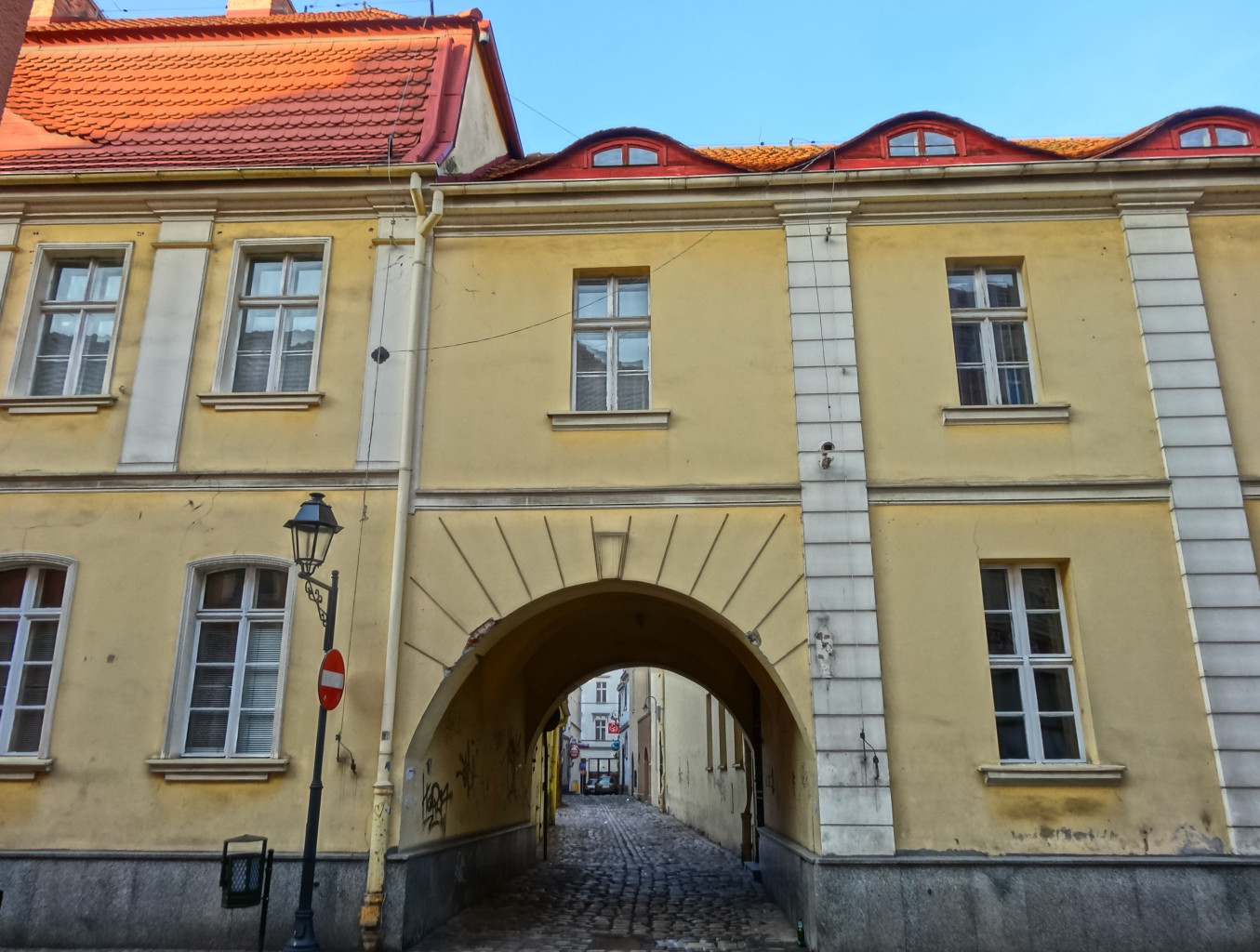
View from Jan Kazimierza street

=== Western frontage ===
The demolition of the church was carried out by Nazis forces from January 18 to March 27, and abutting tenement houses were completely razed by 23 October 1940. In return, the Nazis did not manage to erect any new edifice. The frontage was demolished by decision of Werner Kampe, then NSDAP Kreisleiter of the area and, technically speaking, mayor of Bydgoszcz, following the German repression against Bydgoszcz population performed before the Jesuit church in September 1939.

The adjoined buildings which were razed, housed, successively the police HQ (from the beginning of the 19th century), the Municipal Savings Bank, and the Regional Museum "Leon Wyczółkowski" (1923–1939).

Currently, the western frontage of the Old Market comprises the elevation of the town hall building, formerly the Jesuit college between 1644 and 1782. Beside the city hall stands on the place the Monument to Struggle and Martyrdom of the Bydgoszcz.

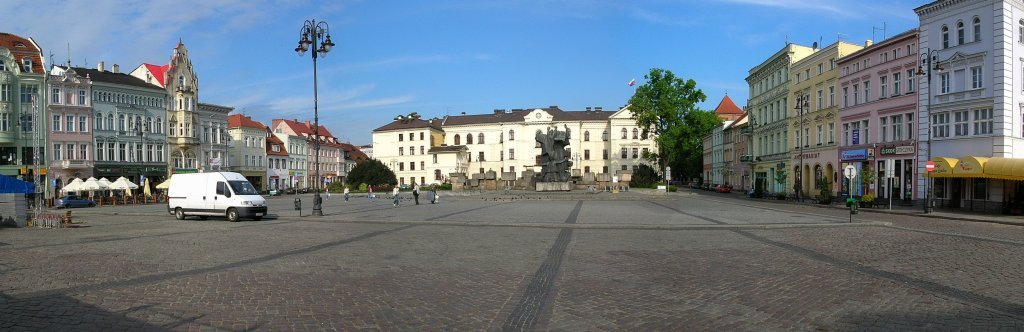
Current view of the western frontage, before square renovation

Former Jesuit Church

The first Jesuit monks came to Bydgoszcz from the Jesuit College in Poznań in 1616, and were accommodated at the parish church, strongly supported by local authorities (burghers and dean of the Kujawska Chapter). In 1619, the monks founded their residence in the city, with a grammar school next to it; it then developed into a full-fledged Jesuit College in 1647. The construction of the church of Holy Cross was completed in 1649, the northern tower in the 1650s, the southern one in 1695.

During the Swedish invasions in the mid-17th century, the ensemble was plundered. A slow reconstruction lasted until 1740. In 1806, the church was dedicated to Saint Ignatius of Loyola. Unfortunately, in mid-June the same year, a violent storm knocked down towers spires: through public contributions they were covered with temporary roofs in 1857, before being rebuilt with a Neo-gothic appearance in 1882.

During the inter-war period, the German-catholic-owned church carried out a service in Polish every Sunday at 11.00. In 1925, during a renovation in the Crypt, 86 coffins from the second half of the 17th century were found, including Franciszek Ossoliński's, the only son of the grand crown chancellor Jerzy Ossoliński, prematurely deceased in 1648.

After the Nazis destruction, the empty space was never re-allocated and the center of the city was left mutilated.

A request to rebuild the church was made in 1946. Unfortunately, the wording church was not in line with socialist authorities principles. Other efforts were made in the 1980s, through the Social Committee for Reconstruction, however, the lack of clear consent from the Roman Catholic diocese of Bydgoszcz was always an obstacle difficult to surmount.

The Jesuit church was a perfect instance of Polish Palladian architecture. The church had a 36.5 by 13.04 metres (119.8 ft × 42.8 ft) hall, its portal being incorporated into the western frontage of the Old Market Square. It had two side chapels devoted to Our Lady and Saint Joseph. Interiors displayed a Baroque architecture influence. The church towers, while late additions, boasted magnificent baroque spires. Along with the towers, the portal also underwent a Neo-gothic renovation in the 1880s.

In 1850, two paintings by Maksymilian Piotrowski (1813–1875) were installed in the church: Saint Ignatius Loyola at the main altar and Immaculate Conception of the Blessed Virgin Mary at the altar of the right chapel. Our Lady's chapel was decorated with a painting by Antoni Procajłowicz (1876–1949) and the interior of the church was decorated with the works of Poznan sculptor Władysław Marcinkowski.

Some elements of the former Jesuit church are still preserved in other Polish sacred buildings:

- Maksymilian Piotrowski's Saint Ignatius Loyola stands now in the Jesuit church of Jastrzębia Góra;
- Maksymilian Piotrowski's Immaculate Conception of the Blessed Virgin Mary can be found in St Peter's and St Paul's Church of Bydgoszcz;
- a picture of the Sacred Heart of Jesus, some benches and confessionals, and the main cross of the main altar (dated 1806) are located in Bydgoszcz Cathedral;
- Saint Joseph's and Saint Aldabert's altars, a candle holder and a tabernacle are housed in St. Vincent de Paul Basilica Minor in Bydgoszcz;
- Saint Anthony of Padua's altar and a pulpit now stand in the Church of Saint of Padua in Bydgoszcz.
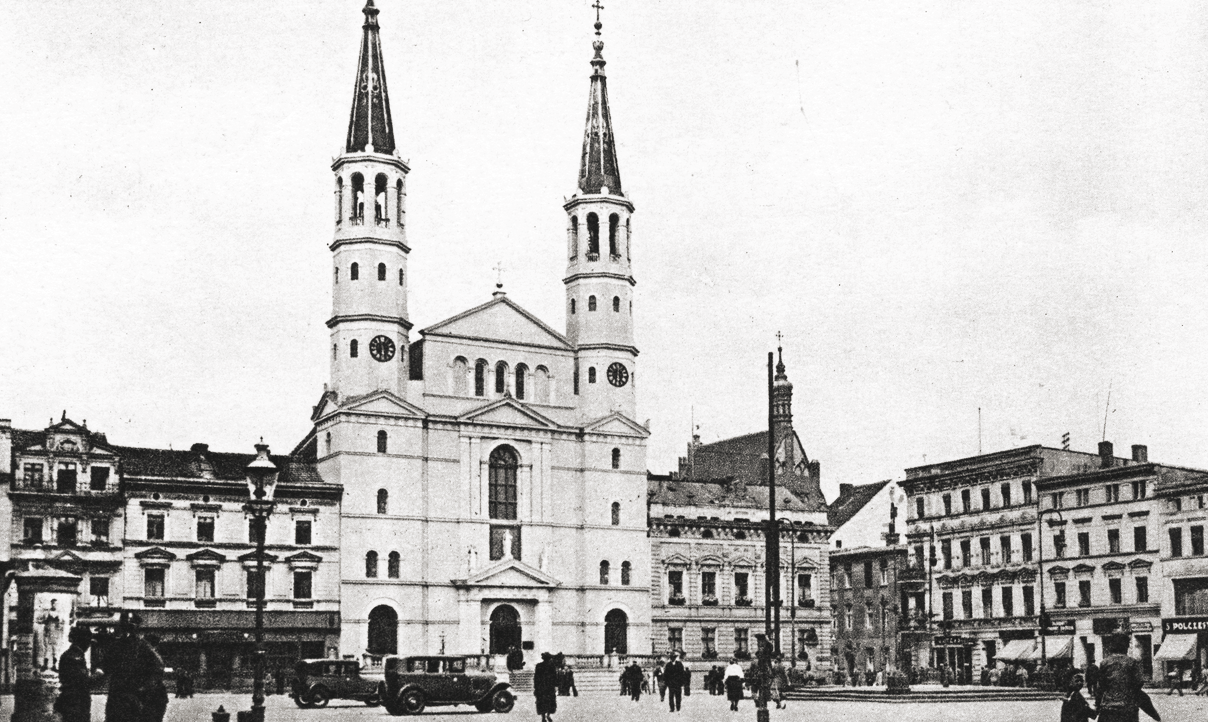
The Jesuit church in the 1930s

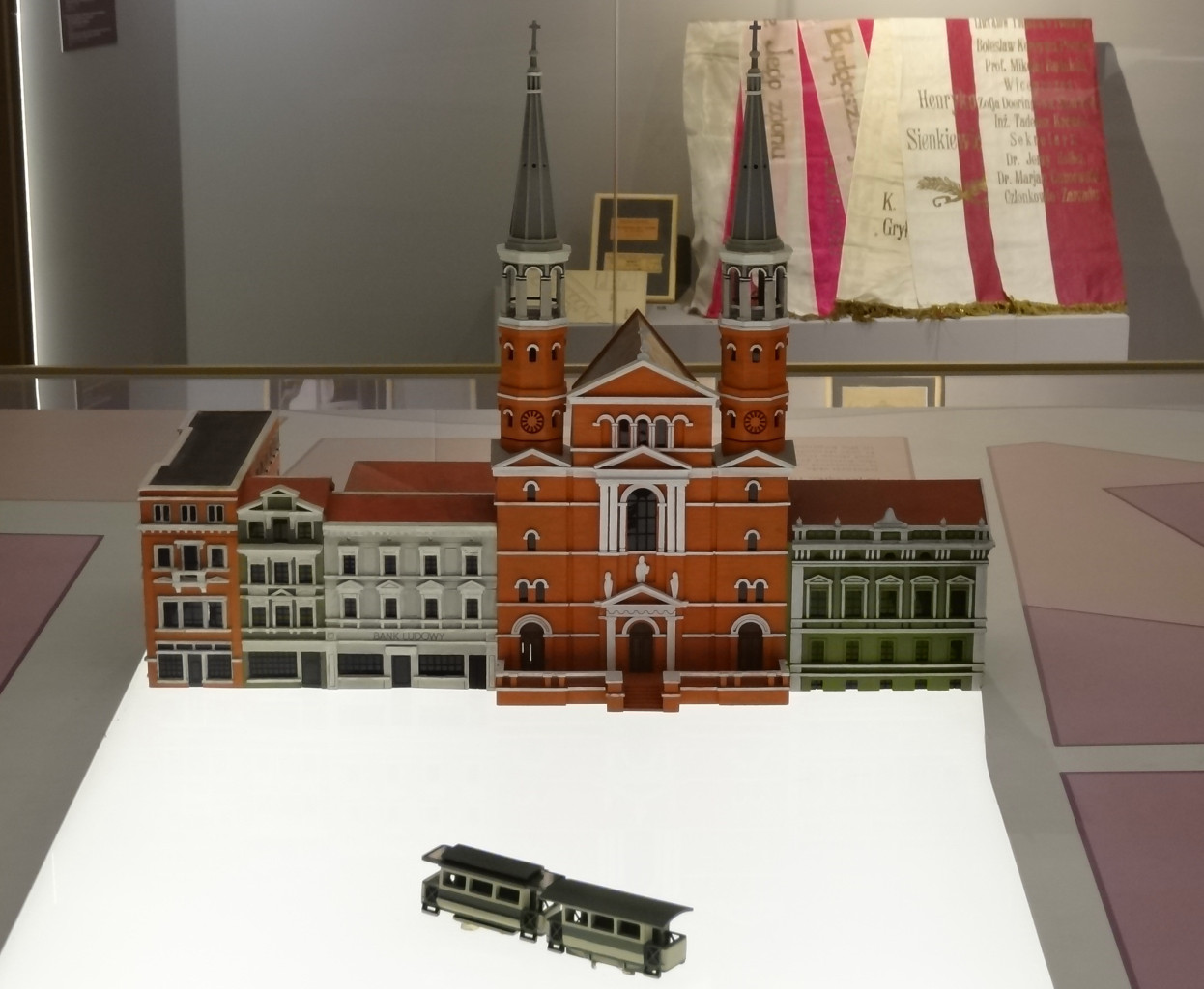
Reduced replica of the Jesuit buildings complex

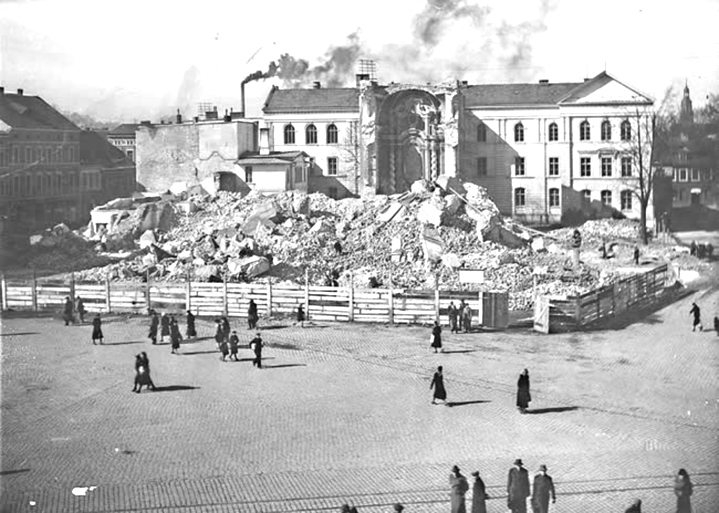
Ruins of the church in 1940

City Hall, cornering Niedźwiedzia and Farna streets

The baroque edifice, established by local bishop Kasper Działyński and Grand Chancellor Jerzy Ossoliński, has been erected from 1644 to 1653, with aim to accommodate there a Jesuit College. In the 17th century, the building contained apartments, a school with four or five classes, a hall adapted to performances of the school theater during school and church ceremonies, and a music office for members of the school orchestra.

The construction works were handled by Jesuit builder Wojciech Przybyłkowicz. The first extension of the college has been carried out in 1696, funded by Jan Stefan Komorowski from Malbork, brother of Wojciech, then rector of the Jesuit College in Bydgoszcz (1688–1689). Follow-on works were performed during the periods 1697–1702 and 1705–1709, under the direction of Wojciech Głaznowicz. Last major re-buildings occurred from 1726 to 1740. The college, together with the Jesuit church formed one of the most impressive building ensemble in Bydgoszcz. It was not only the highlight of the city, but also an attraction for various dignified visitors: in 1657, were accommodated here king John II Casimir Vasa with his wife, Frederick William, Elector of Brandenburg and prince of the Kingdom of Prussia with his wife Luiza, as well as officers and generals of the Swedish and Russian army during armed conflicts in the centuries.

At the dissolution of the Jesuit order in 1770, the building was used as a German gymnasium. Under the Duchy of Warsaw rule, a Main Department School (1808–1812) then a faculty school (1812–1815) have been housed there. At those times, the establishment received the visit of Julian Ursyn Niemcewicz and Tadeusz Czacki, while having as students, among others, Stefan Florian Garczyński, a poet and friend of Adam Mickiewicz, growing up with relatives at the Skórzewski Palace in Lubostroń. After the fall of the Duchy of Warsaw and Bydgoszcz's integration into the Kingdom of Prussia, the former college housed anew a German, classical royal gymnasium (1817–1878). In 1879, buildings were purchased by the city to become the seat of the city authorities. The design of the reconstruction works to fit the city assembly was realized by councilor Wilhelm Lincke with brick master Albert Rose and carpenter Heinrich Mautz. This renovation, apart from changing the façade style, modified also the internal layout of the rooms, adapting it to the needs of the office. The unveiling ceremony of the mayor's precincts took place on 19 December 1879.

As a result of the succeeding reconstructions of 1697–1702 and during the 19th century, the building has lost its original Baroque character. The current edifice is made of brick and plaster. It has a basement plus two stories: its footprint is an elongated rectangle with two avant-corps with a side wing behind the eastern frontage. Elevations on the square reflect neo-classicism, with eclectic stucco motifs. Some rooms are barrel vaulted. The main entrance may appear modest for such an edifice, the main reason being that the building was never supposed to be visible directly from the square: only the successive demolitions of 1940 made it accessible via the marketplace.

From 1994 to 1996, a major overhaul occurred, together with a modernization and an extension of the eastern side wing. On 19 April 2017 a clock was unveiled on the facade of the building. Bydgoszcz town hall has been listed on the Kuyavian-Pomeranian Voivodeship Heritage List (Nr.A/309/1) since 1992.

Two plaques can be noticed on the walls of the city hall:

- on the northern side, a commemoration of the 600th anniversary of the foundation of Bydgoszcz, 1346–1946 (unveiled in 1996);
- on the eastern wall, a plaque celebrating the anniversary of the liberation of the city from Nazi occupation (1950).
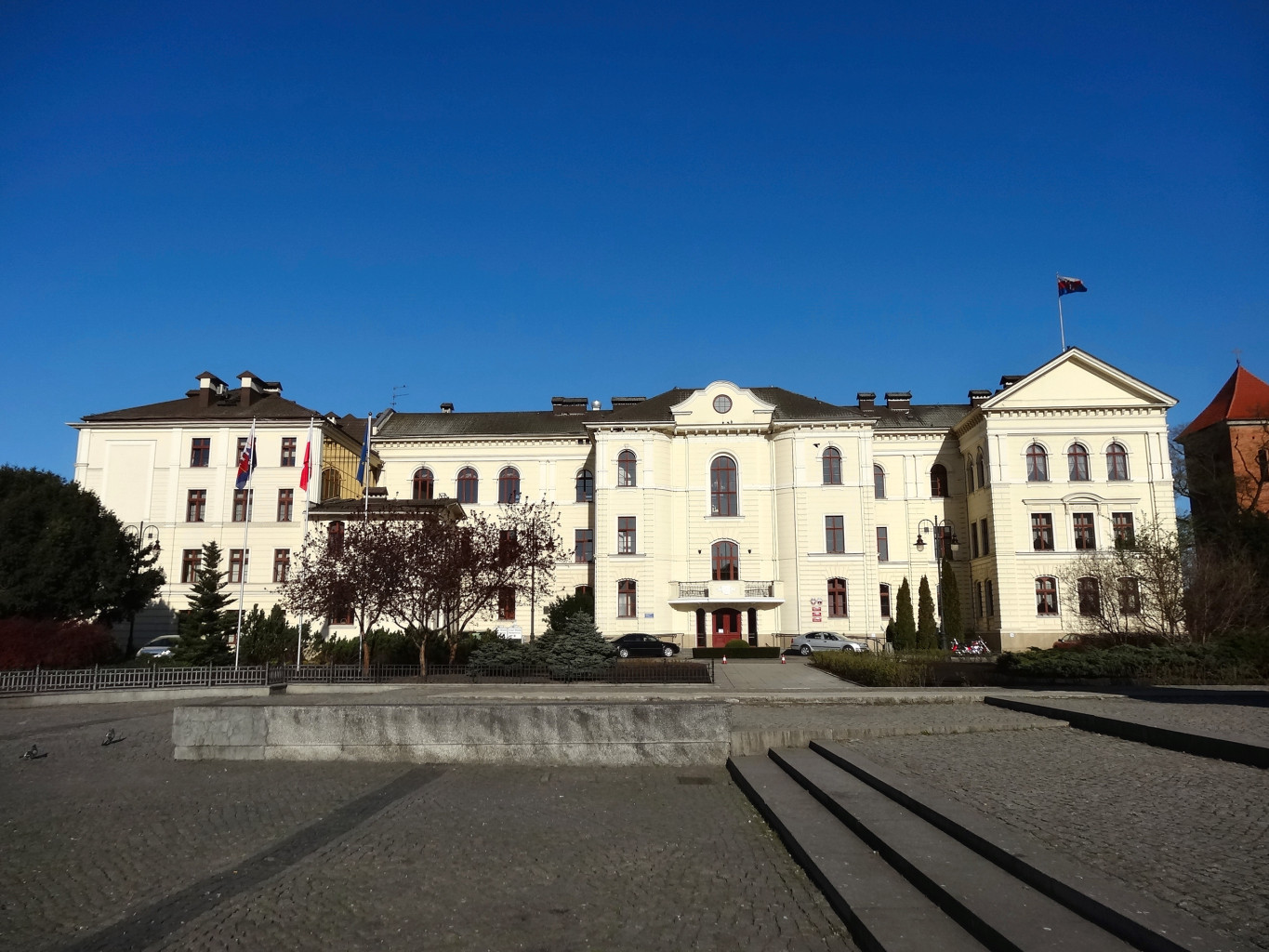
Main frontage on the marketsquare

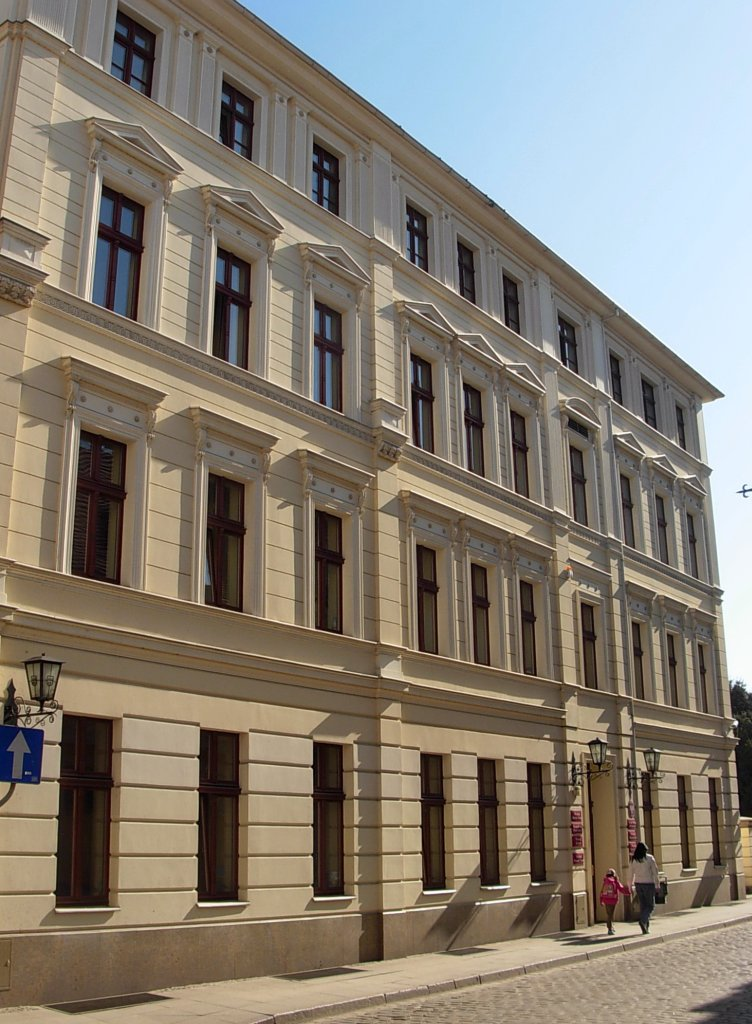
Facade on Niedźwiedzia street

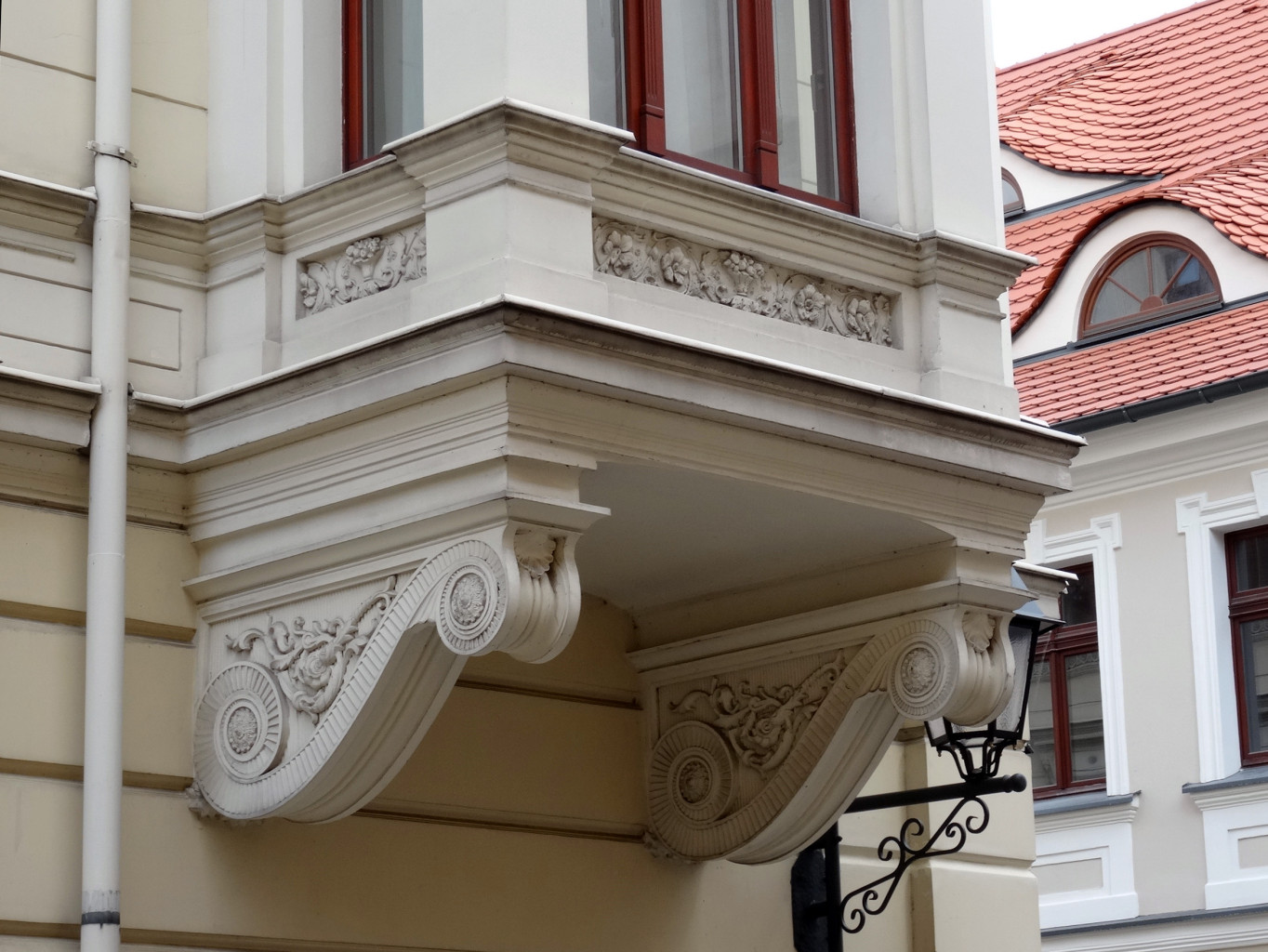
Corbels supporting a bay window

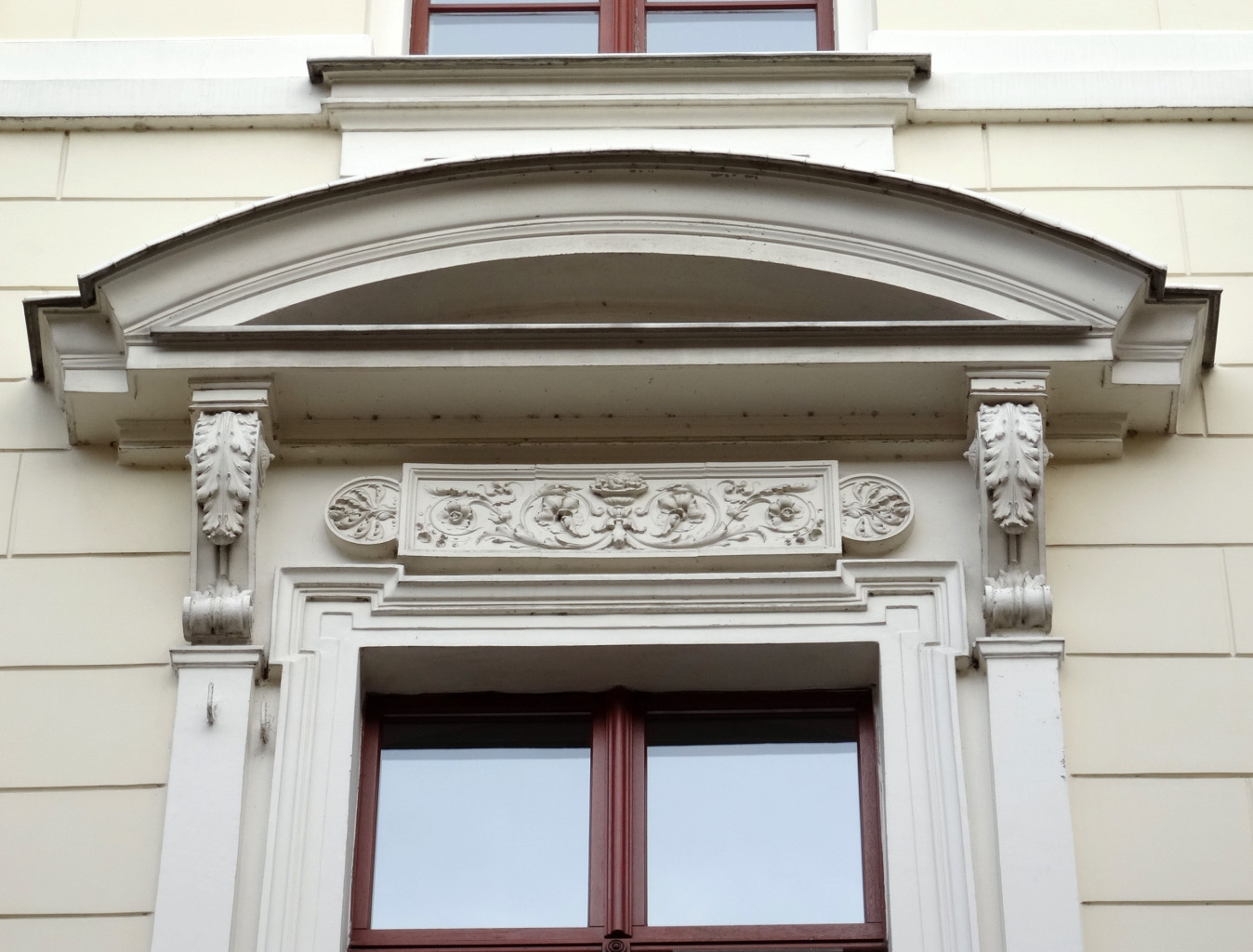
Pediment and adorned lintel

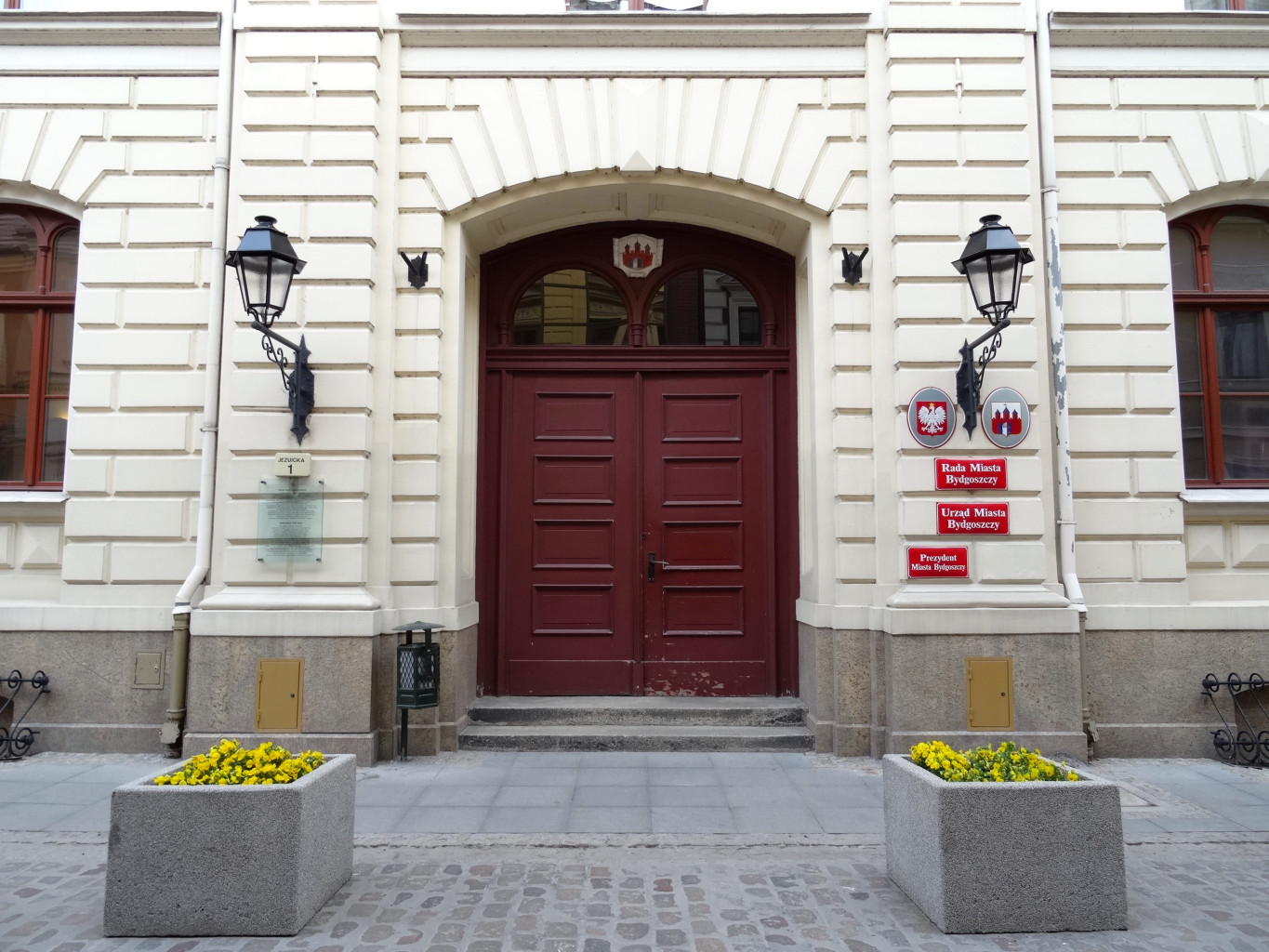
Main entrance on the place

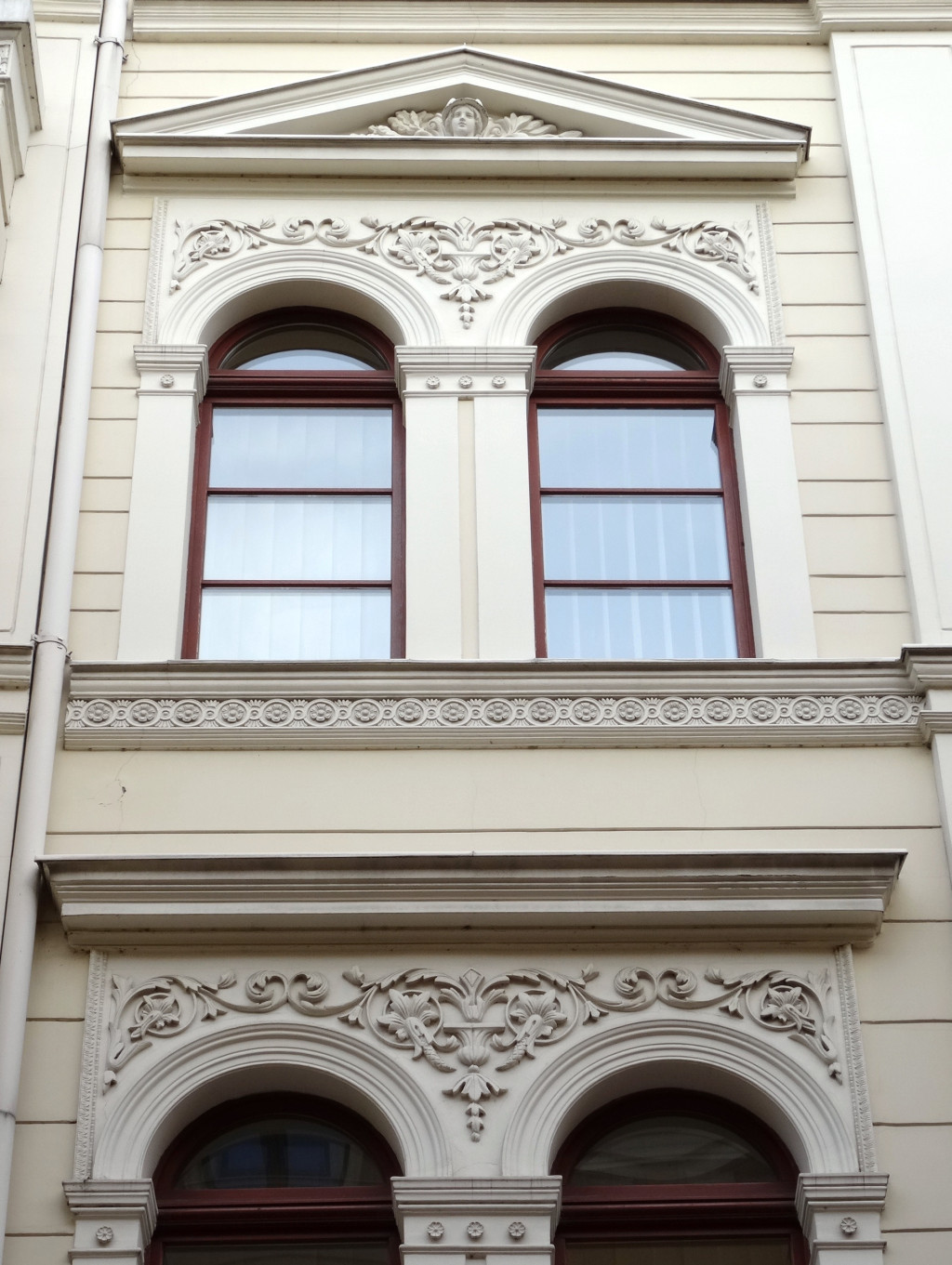
Decoration details

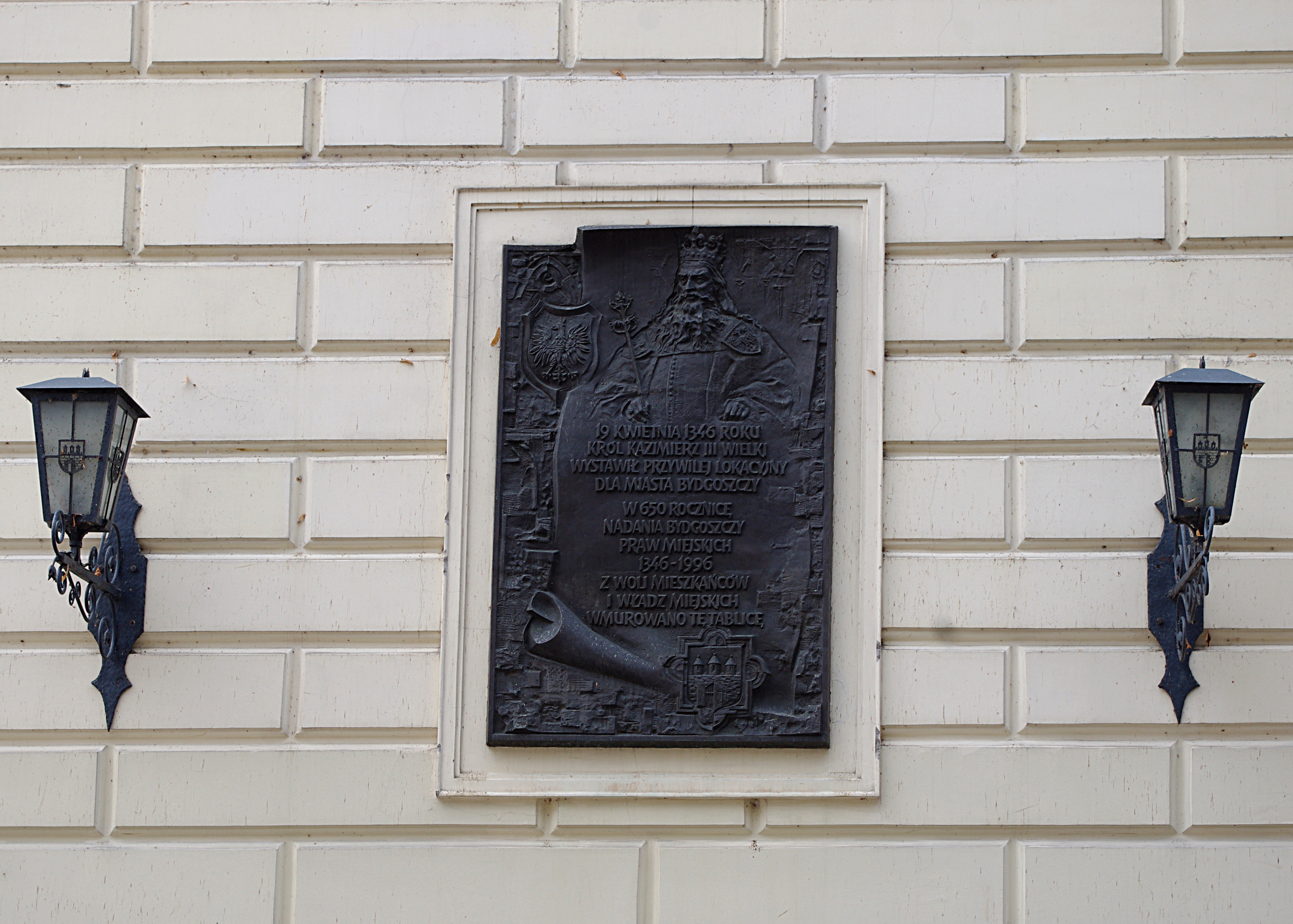
600th anniversary of Bydgoszcz - Commemorating plaque

=== Outdoor monuments ===
Monument to Struggle and Martyrdom of the Bydgoszcz Land (Polish: Pomnik Walki i Męczeństwa Ziemi Bydgoskiej)

In order to commemorate the public executions carried out by Nazis in 1939, also called Bydgoszcz Bloody Sunday, the city council funded, in 1946, the realization of a first memorial located in front of the town hall on the Old Market Square: it was a black granite slab, lying on a low plinth, where was engraved a cross and the following dedication: Sanctified by the Martyr's Blood of Poles Fighting for Freedom. The author was Piotr Triebler, a sculptor from Bydgoszcz. This commemorative plaque survived until the erection of another monument.

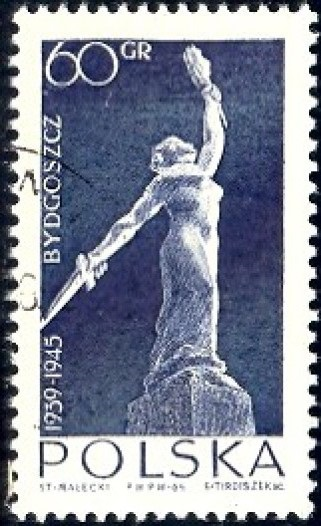
Stamp of Nike monument in Bydgoszcz, 1964

In 1963, a competition for a monument dedicated to the Bloody Sunday's victims was announced. The selected project, by Wacław Kowalik, portrayed the figure of Nike standing on top of a high obelisk, decorated with bas-reliefs. Nike's right, lowered hand, held a naked sword, in her left she raised a bouquet of flowers. The monument was designed to be erected on the Old Market Square in front of the building library. Eventually, Polish 1968 March events pushed the state authorities to revise their view on such a commemoration, and the monument was never created. However, in its place, Bydgoszcz received a monument designed originally to celebrate the heroes of the Warsaw Ghetto, which did never stand in the capital in this time of unrest, Polish United Workers' Party avoiding to celebrate martyrdom, in any forms. In addition, giving this memorial to Bydgoszcz was a way to abide by the will of the inhabitants since 1946, to fill the loss of the bulldozed western frontage (in 1940) on the Old Market Square. In the end, the never-realized Nike's monument only survived on a Polish post stamp issued in 1964, piece of a series on Monuments to Struggle and Martyrdom.

The ceremony of unveiling of the former Warsaw ghetto monument was held on 5 September 1969, the 30th anniversary of the occupation of Bydgoszcz by Nazi soldiers, in presence of the chairman of the Council for the Protection of Struggle and Martyrdom Sites (Polish: Rada Ochrony Pamięci Walk i Męczeństwa), the minister Janusz Wieczorek, the head of the city council Kazimierz Maludziński, and many representatives of local authorities, political parties, as well as numerous inhabitants.

The monument stood at the very place where the public executions took place in September 1939. Around the memorial was set a fence made of 80 large sandstone blocks, on which were engraved all the places of struggle and martyrdom of the population of the Bydgoszcz territory. The author of this sculpture was Franciszek Masiak from Warsaw; Bydgoszcz architect Jerzy Winiecki designed the architectural environment of the place. Besides, the full project planned to build a Museum of Combat and Martyrdom, collecting documents of Nazi crimes, on the area of the former western frontage, in front of the town hall: this scheme was never accomplished.

At the beginning of the 1990s, beside the monument, four concrete plinths carrying bronze plates were placed:

- the first one to inform that on 9 and 10 September 1939, 40 hostages were executed on the site on the order of the German military commander of Bydgoszcz;
- the second and third plaques had the 40 names engraved;
- the fourth bore the inscription: The monument to the Struggle and Martyrdom commemorates the memory of Polish citizens from Kuyavia, Pomerania and Chełmno regions killed and murdered during World War II in 1939–1945.

The political changes after 1989 added new plaques to the memorial, to commemorate the victims of the Stalinist terror. By the end of 1995, six new tables to the national memory were set by several associations. In the end, the monument was modified in 1993, with the author's accord, by adding a cross in the hand of one of the characters. On 26 August 2007 the 80 plaques surrounding the memorial were moved to the Church of the Holy Polish Martyr Brothers in Bydgoszcz (Polish: Kościół Świętych Polskich Braci Męczenników w Bydgoszczy), located at Jerzy Popiełuszko street 3.

The monument portrays a group of people symbolizing martyrdom and struggle. It evokes the expression of pain and protest, and at the same time the struggle against tyranny and genocide. The bronze sculpture is 7.5 metres (25 ft) high and weighs more than 12 tonnes (26,000 lb). It stands on a granite pedestal. The cast of the sculpture was carried out in the Factory of Technical Devices of Gliwice (Polish: Gliwickie Zakłady Urządzeń Technicznych).

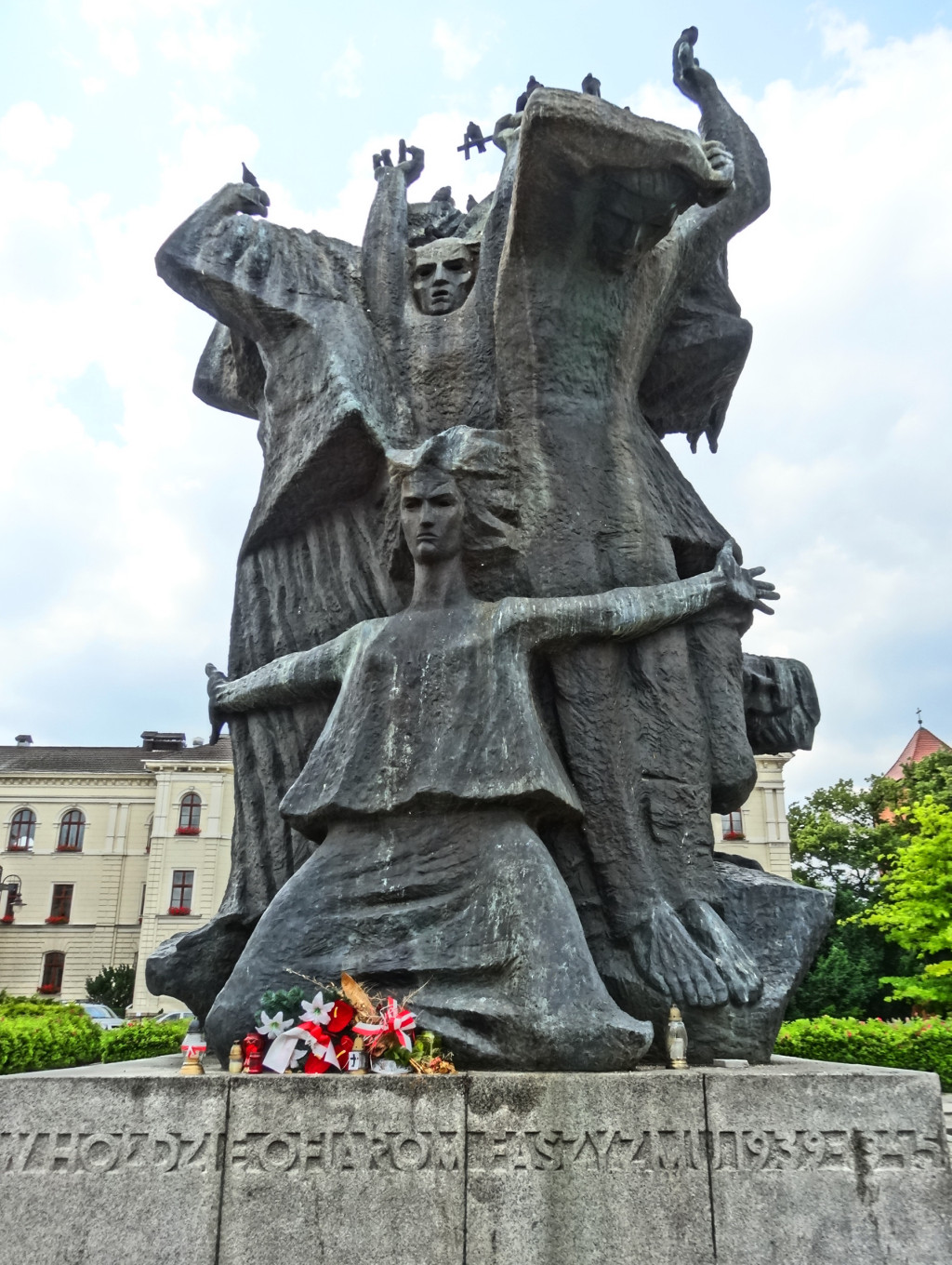
Front view of the memorial

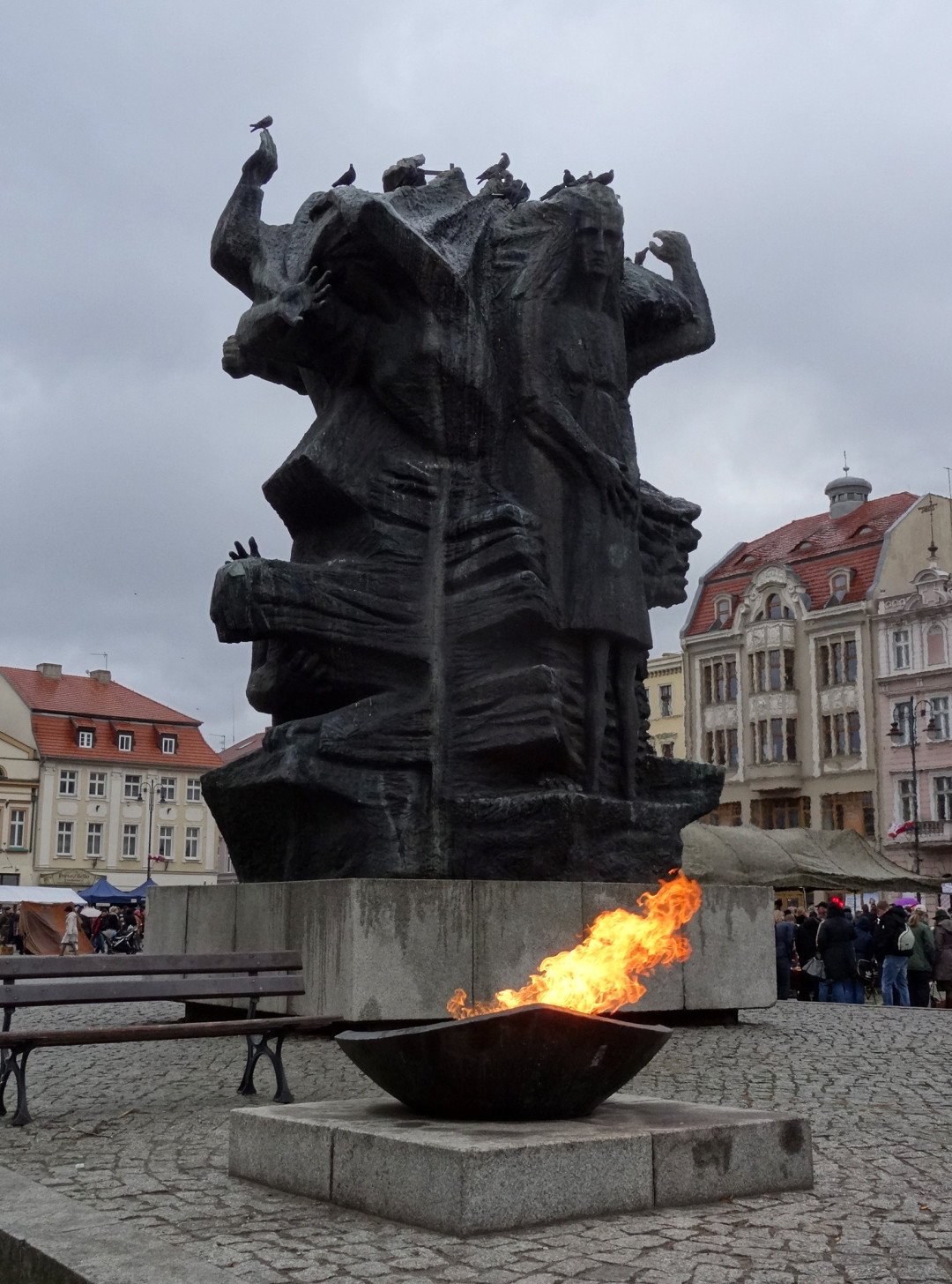
Back view

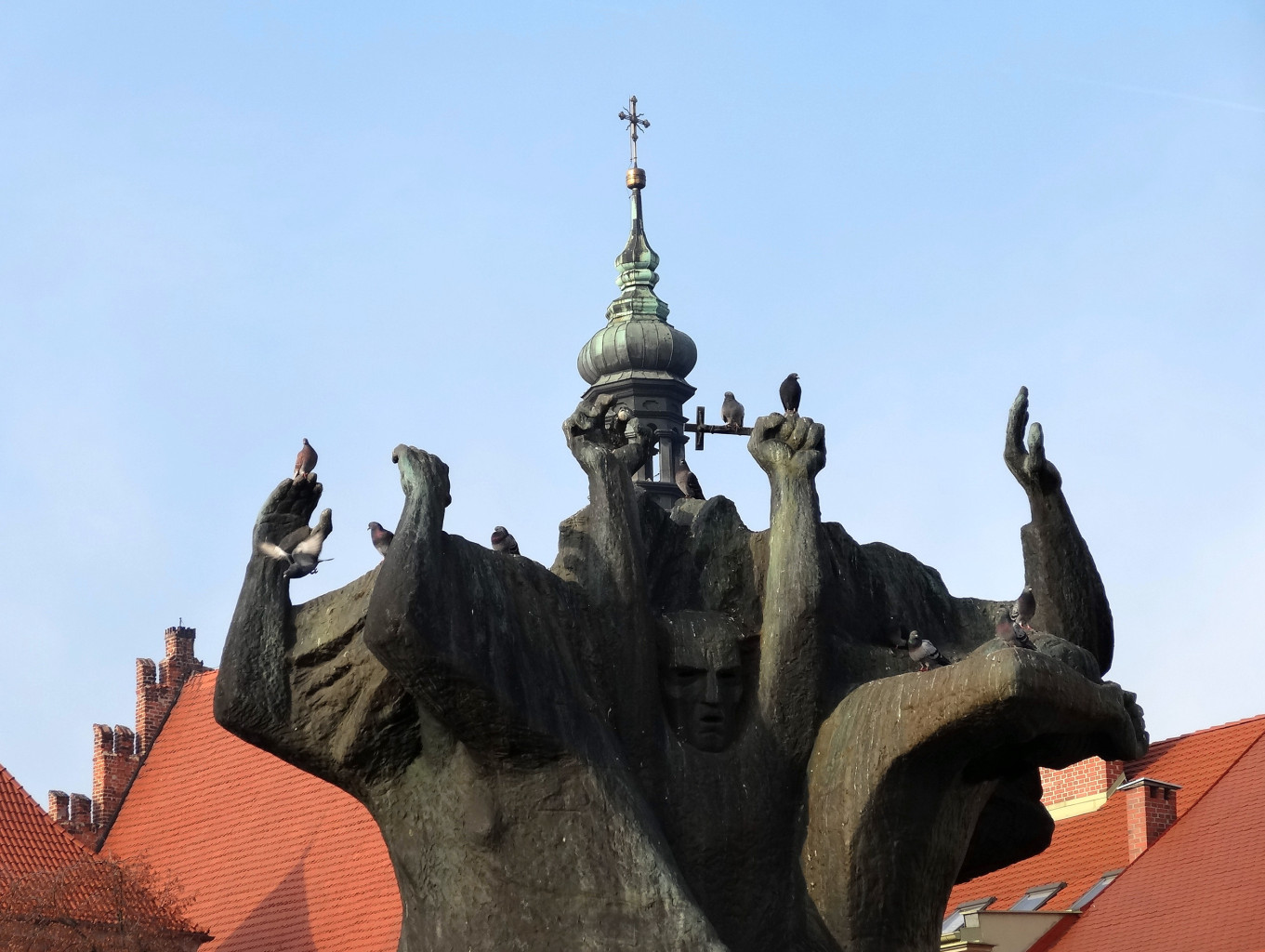
Detail of the cross added in 1993

Children playing with goose or The Well (Polish: Dzieci bawiące się z gęsią)

The fountain called The Well (Polish: Studzienką) was unveiled on 4 October 1909. The author was a sculptor, Karol Kowalczewski, whose name appears at the bottom of the sculpture. The commissioner was Alfred Kupffender, the owner of the pharmacy Under the golden eagle (Polish: Pod Złotym Orłem), who intended to celebrate the 100th anniversary the Kupffender's family business. The sculpture was set on the Old Market Square, in front of the entrance to the pharmacy. After its destruction in 1940, Franciszek Górski, a warehouse manager, rescued many of the bronze fragments, preventing them to be melted away for war purposes.

After WWII, the reconstructed fountain was unveiled on 1 May 1948, at the Old Market Square in front of the library.

The sculpture is made of bronze and depicts two children: a girl and a boy, playing with a goose. It rests on the top of a stone pedestal which base stems from the fountain bowl. Both the pedestal and the bowl are made of shell limestone. Water flows out of holes in the plinth, as well as from the fountain bowl itself down to the tank below. The current design reflects the preserved original form from 1909. Between September and October 2014, the sculpture has undergone a thorough restoration.

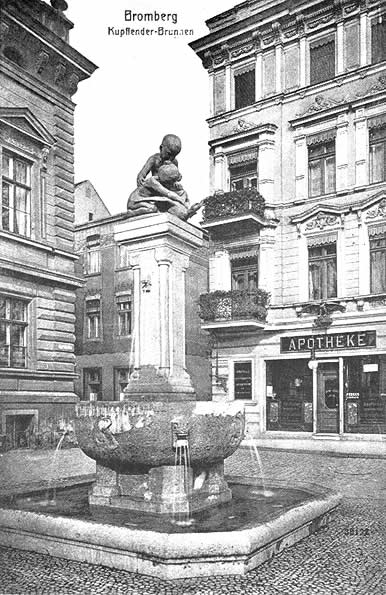
1914 picture of the fountain at its initial location

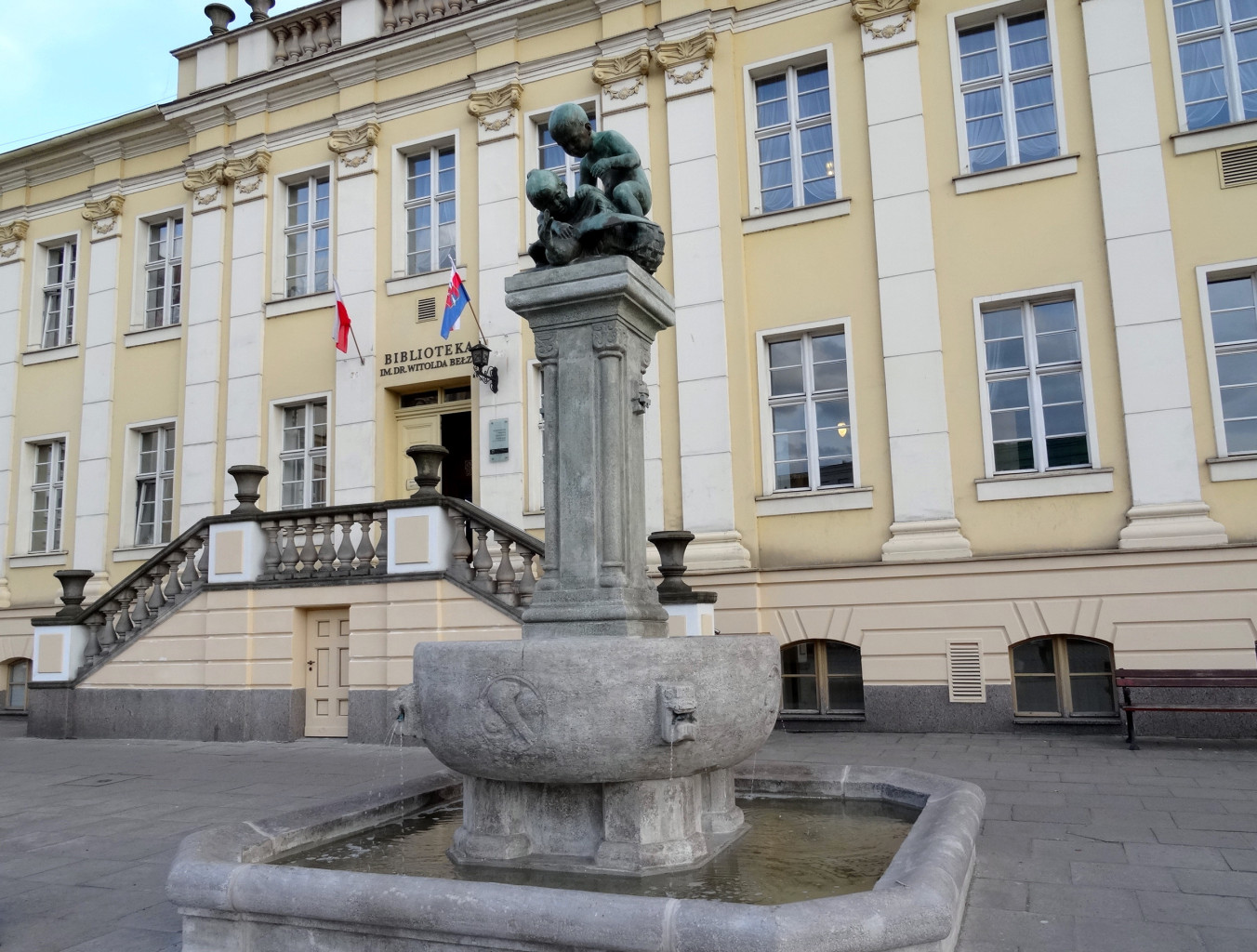
Today's plot in front of the library

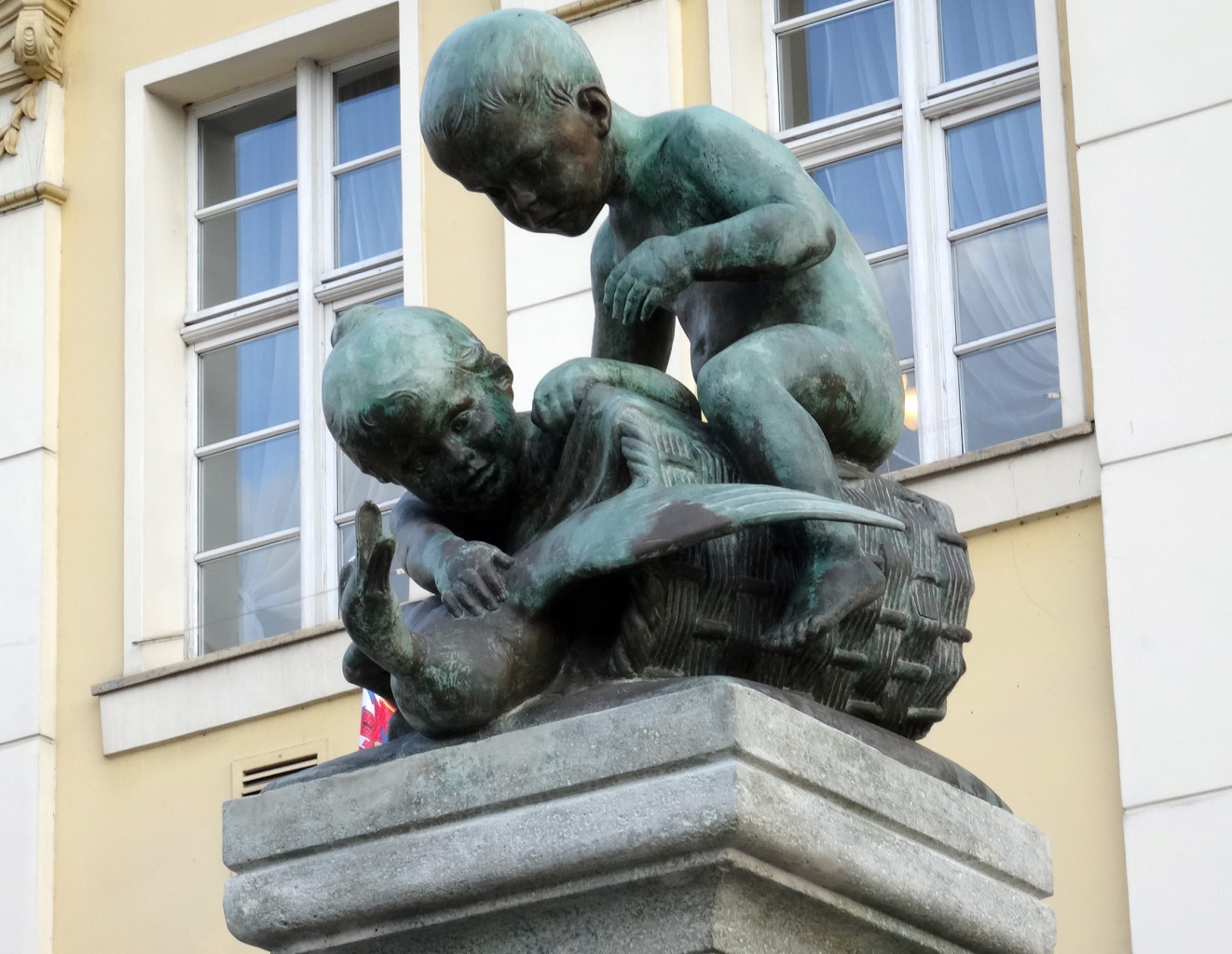
Detail of the sculpture

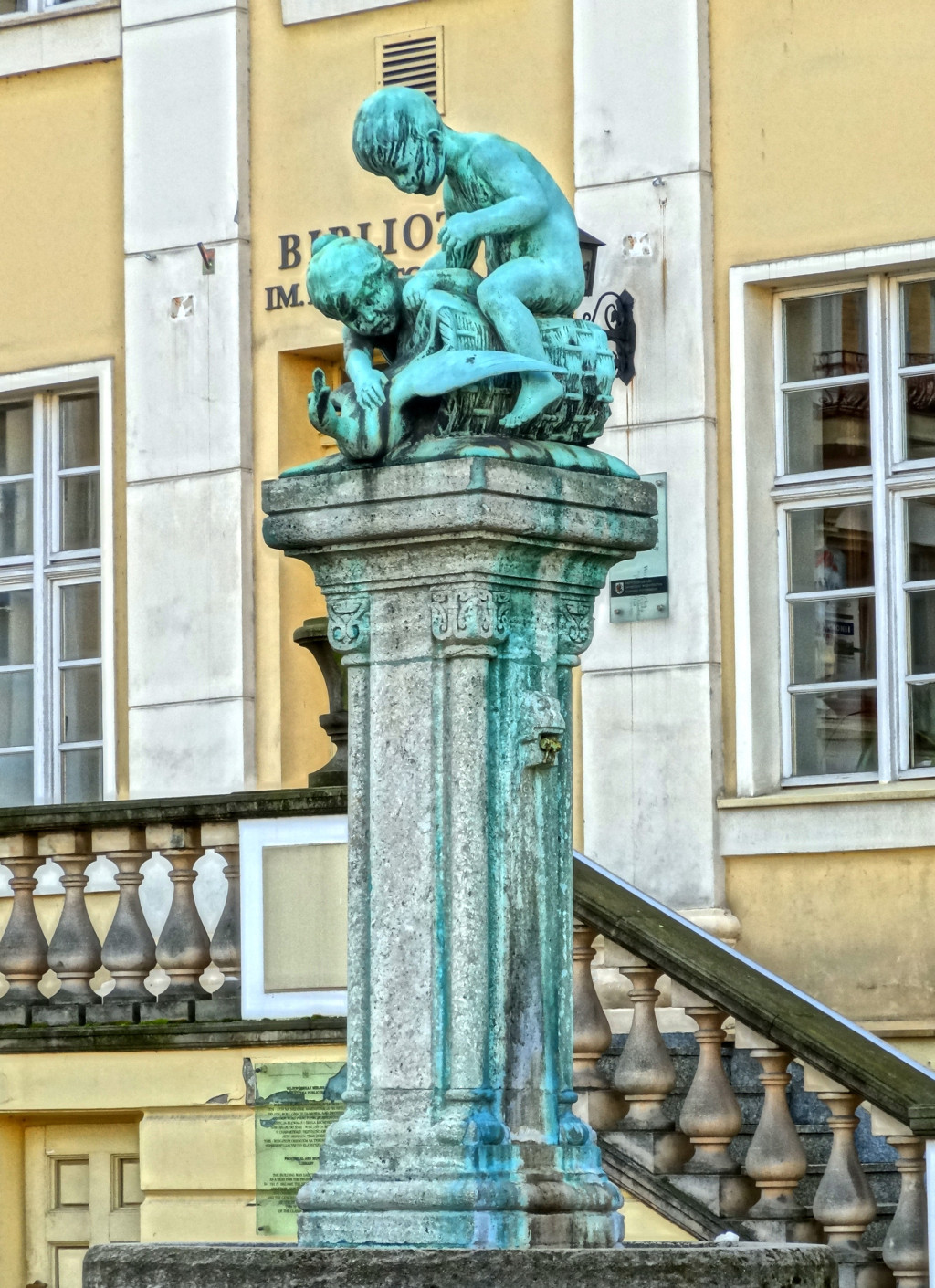
Sculpture with its pedestal

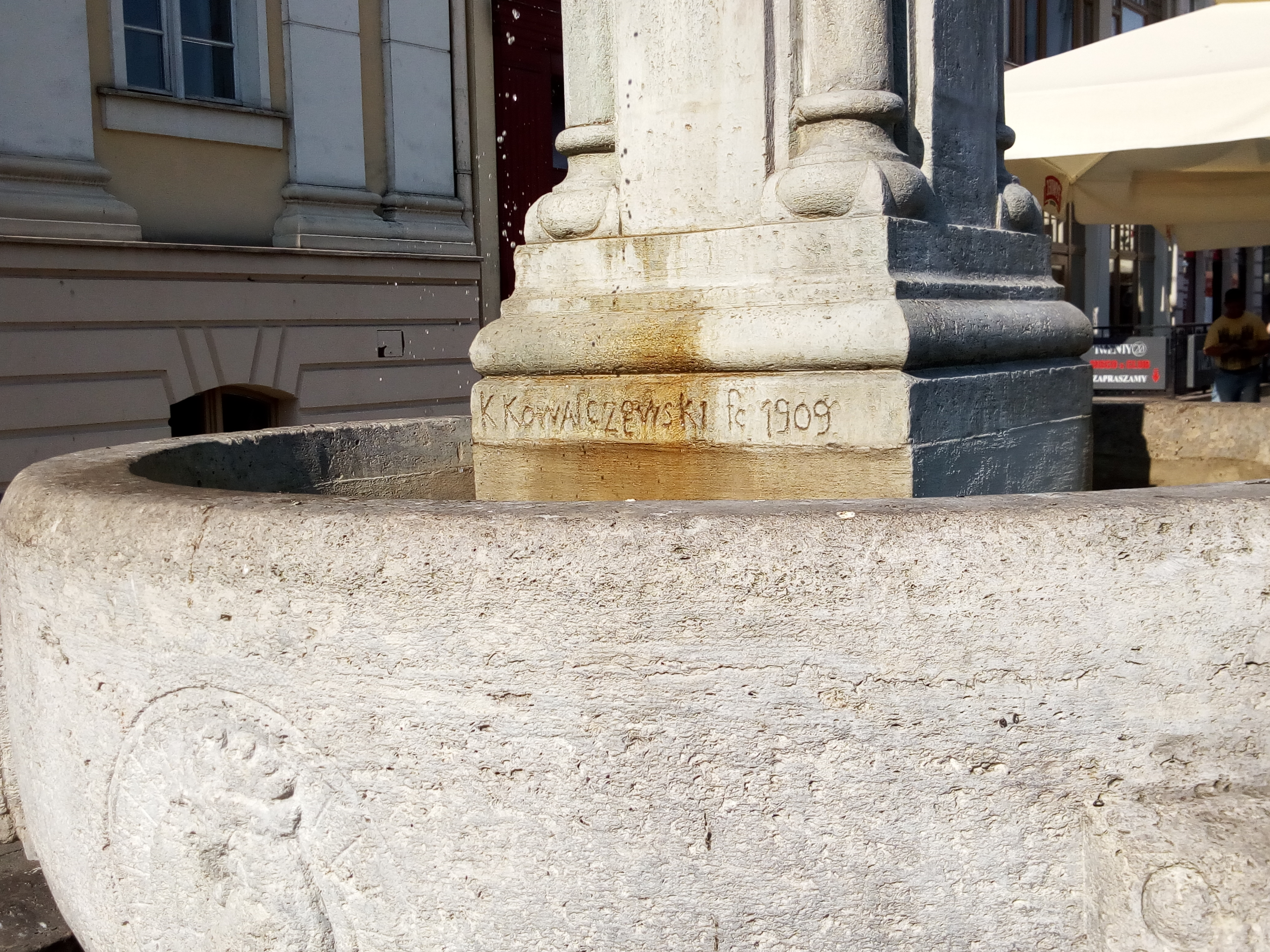
Fountain detail with author name

== See also ==
- Długa street in Bydgoszcz
- Jezuicka Street in Bydgoszcz
- Farna Street in Bydgoszcz
- Mill Island in Bydgoszcz

== Bibliography ==
- (in Polish) Derenda, Jerzy (2006). Piękna stara Bydgoszcz. Tom I z serii: Bydgoszcz miasto na Kujawach. Bydgoszcz: Towarzystwo Miłośników Miasta Bydgoszczy. ISBN 9788391617861.
- (in Polish) Derenda, Jerzy (2008). Bydgoszcz w blasku symboli. Tom II z serii: Bydgoszcz miasto na Kujawach. Bydgoszcz: Towarzystwo Miłośników Miasta Bydgoszczy. ISBN 9788391617809.
- (in Polish) Gliwiński, Eugeniusz (1996). Bydgoskie pomniki w latach zaboru pruskiego. Kalendarz Bydgoski. Bydgoszcz: Towarzystwo Miłośników Miasta Bydgoszczy. pp. 96–102.
- (in Polish) Alabrudzińska, Elżbieta (1991). Kolegium jezuickie w Bydgoszczy w XVII i XVIII w. Kronika Bydgoska XI. Bydgoszcz: Towarzystwo Miłosnikow Miasta Bydgoszczy – Bydgoskie Towarzystwo Naukowe. pp. 179–194.
- (in Polish) Biskup, Marian (1991). Historia Bydgoszczy. Tom I do roku 1920. Warszawa-Poznań: Bydgoskie Towarzystwo Naukowe. pp. 96–102.
- (in Polish) Derenda, Jerzy (2003). Pęknięte serce miasta. Kalendarz Bydgoski. Bydgoszcz: Towarzystwo Miłośników Miasta Bydgoszczy.
- (in Polish) Pastuszewski, Stefan (1991). Kościół pod wezwaniem św. Krzyża (później św. Ignacego Loyoli) w Bydgoszczy. Kronika Bydgoska XI. Bydgoszcz: Towarzystwo Miłosnikow Miasta Bydgoszczy – Bydgoskie Towarzystwo Naukowe. pp. 237–240.
- (in Polish) Pawlak, Marian (2008). Kolegium Jezuickie w Bydgoszczy (1619–1780). Kronika Bydgoska XXX. Bydgoszcz: Towarzystwo Miłosnikow Miasta Bydgoszczy – Bydgoskie Towarzystwo Naukowe. pp. 51–72.
- (in Polish) Umiński, Janusz (1996). Bydgoszcz-Przewodnik. Bydgoszcz: Regionalny Oddział PTTK „Szlak Brdy”.
- (in Polish) Umiński, Janusz (2004). Bydgoszcz-Przewodnik. Bydgoszcz: Wydawnictwo Uczelniane Wyższej Szkoły Turystyki i Hotelarstwa.
- (in Polish) Parucka, Krystyna (2008). Zabytki Bydgoszczy – minikatalog. Bydgoszcz-Przewodnik: „Tifen” Krystyna Parucka. ISBN 9788392719106.
